= List of Grupo Éxito brands =

There is a list of brands belonging to the South American retail company Grupo Éxito.

== Current ==
=== Éxito ===
Éxito is a Colombian supermarket chain owned by Grupo Éxito and headquartered in Medellín, Colombia. It was founded in Envigado in the year 1949, by Gustavo Toro Quintero and now is one of the largest supermarket companies in the country, and has 390 stores located in 175 municipalities of Colombia. The capital city of Bogotá has the most stores.

=== Carulla ===
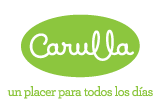

For people with the surname, see Carulla (surname).

Carulla is a Colombian supermarket chain owned by Grupo Éxito and headquartered in Bogotá, Colombia. It was founded in 1905, and now is one of the largest supermarket companies in the country. Founded in the city of Barranquilla, it soon moved most of its operations and headquarters to Bogota.

Carulla has associated its brand with quality products, specializing in fruits and vegetables, although it offers most of the product categories offered in any other supermarket chain. It currently considers its destination categories to be fruits and vegetables, meats, spirits and liquors, and bakery products.

In 2000 it merged with Almacenes Vivero supermarket chain based in Barranquilla, its then-rival which was most prevalent on the Atlantic coast. The merger formed Carulla Vivero S.A. and became the second largest retail chain in Colombia

As of 2006, the Carulla Vivero operated 156 stores; 83 of operated under the Carulla brand.

As of 2006 Carulla Vivero was acquired by Almacenes Exito the largest supermarket company in Colombia, which is and owned by French retailer Groupe Casino.

The Carulla brand will continue to exist after the merger since it has over 100 years of history and holds a strong market participation in Bogota, Medellin, Cartagena, and Barranquilla. The brand's motto is "Carulla, an everyday pleasure".

Carulla was also the first retailer in Colombia to use a loyalty card which currently has about 250,000 members, called the Supercliente Card. The top 45,000 customers have the Diamond Superliente Card as they represent about 65% of the company's profits. Currently it was 98 stores nationwide. Additionally it has the option of delivering groceries to homes or pick up

=== Surtimax ===
Surtimax
- Company type: Subsidiary
- Founded: 1992
- Founder: Alberto Cardenas
- Owner: Carulla Vivero (formerly); Grupo Éxito

Surtimax is a supermarket that currently only operates in the Colombian departments of Antioquía and Cundinamarca. It formerly operated in Atlántico, Bolívar, Caldas, Córdoba, Meta, and Sucre Departments.

It was founded in 1992 as Invercárdenas, a company owned by Alberto Cárdenas, who open his first store in Corabastos.

=== Super Inter ===
Comercializadora Giraldo y Gómez y Cia S.A.
- Company type: Subsidiary
- Founded: October 17, 1992; 33 years ago
- Headquarters: Cali, Valle del Cauca

Super Inter is a supermarket founded in Cali in 1992. It operates in four Colombian departments, Caldas, Quindío, Risaralda, and Valle del Cauca. It formerly operated in Huila and Tolima. In 2014, Grupo Éxito bought Super Inter..

=== Surtimayorista ===
Surtimayorista
- Company type: Subsidiary
- Founded: 2016; 9 years ago

Surtimayorista is a cash and carry supermarket that was launched in 2016.

== Defunct ==
=== La Candelaria ===
La Candelaria was a supermarket owned by Cadenalco.

=== Merquefácil ===
Merquefácil was a supermarket owned by Carulla Vivero.

=== Óptimo ===
Óptimo
- Company type: Subsidiary
- Founded: October 14, 1997; 28 years ago
- Defunct: 2002
- Number of locations: 3
- Owner: Cadenalco

Óptimo was a Colombian supermarket chain founded October 14, 1997. It had three locations in Ibagué, Neiva, and Villavicencio and was previously owned by Cadenalco. It dissolved in 2002.

=== Pomona ===
Pomona
- Company type: Subsidiary
- Founded: 1967; 58 years ago
- Defunct: 2012
- Successor: Carulla
- Owner: Cadenalco (formerly) Grupo Éxito

Pomona was a supermarket chain founded in 1967. It was bought by Cadenalco in 1993, when it had eight locations, all in Bogotá, Colombia. It was acquired by Grupo Éxito in 1999 and dissolved in 2012.

=== Próximo ===
Próximo was a supermarket chain owned by Cadenalco.

=== Vivero ===
Vivero
- Company type: Subsidiary
- Founded: 1969; 56 years ago
- Founder: Alberto Azout
- Defunct: 2009
- Headquarters: Barranquilla, Atlántico
- Owner: Carulla Vivero (formerly) Grupo Éxito

Vivero was a supermarket chain founded in 1969 owned by Carulla Vivero before its acquisition by Grupo Éito.

== Companies ==
=== Grupo Éxito ===
Grupo Éxito is a South American retail company. It operates 2,606 stores in South America. The stores sell a wide range of food and non food products. Though originally a textiles maker and seller (under such brand names as Arkitect, People, Bronzini, Pop Rose) recent acquisitions (mostly within the last 10–20 years) have further diversified the business making it a major grocer (under brand names like surtimax and carulla sales of food products make up about 70-75% of revenue). At its hypermarkets (the largest of which is the Éxito chain) it sells both packaged foods and perishables in addition to department store type products ranging from electronics to furniture.

Éxito is Colombia's largest supermarket chain.

=== Cadenalco ===
Gran Cadena de Almacenes Colombianos S.A.
- Company type: Public
- Founded: 1959; 66 years ago
- Defunct: 2001

Cadenalco was a colombian retail company that operated brans such as Ley and Pomona.

=== Carulla Vivero ===
Carulla Vivero S.A.
- Founded: 2000; 25 years ago
- Defunct: 2010

Carulla Vivero was a colombian retail company that operated brands such as Carulla and Vivero.
