= Naouri =

Naouri is a surname. Notable people with the surname include:

- Gabriel Naouri, French businessman
- Jean-Charles Naouri (born 1949), French businessman
- Jean-Yves Naouri (born 1959), French businessman
- Laurent Naouri (born 1964), French bass-baritone
- Rahamim Naouri (1902-1985), French-Algerian rabbi
