= Synagogue of Chasseloup-Laubat =

Orthodox synagogue in Paris, France

- Synagogue de Chasseloup-Laubat
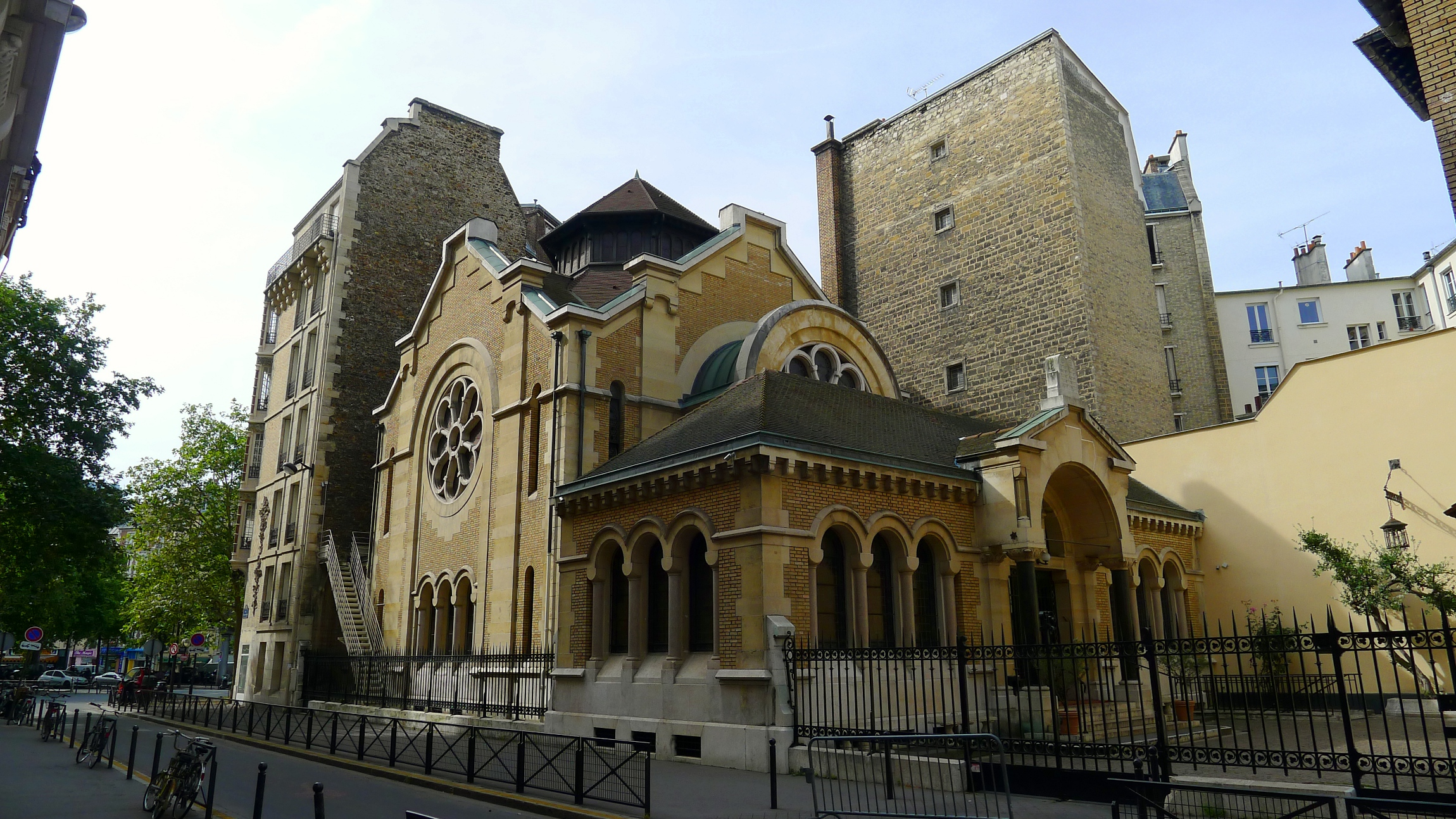

- Location of the synagogue in Paris

Religion
- Affiliation: Orthodox Judaism
- Ecclesiastical or organizational status: Synagogue
- Year consecrated: 1913
- Status: Active

Location
- Location: 14 Rue Chasseloup Laubat, 75015
- Municipality: 15th arrondissement, Paris
- Country: France
- Interactive map of Synagogue of Chasseloup-Laubat
- Coordinates: 48°50′51″N 2°18′17″E

Architecture
- Architect: Lucien Bechmann
- Style: Byzantine Revival
- Funded by: Edmond de Rothschild
- Established: 19th century (as a congregation)
- Groundbreaking: September 26, 1912
- Completed: 1913
- Construction cost: 396,000 francs (1913)
- Monument historique
- Type: Synagogue
- Criteria: Patrimoine du XXe siècle
- Designated: November 24, 2011
- Reference no.: EA75000012

The Synagogue of Chasseloup-Laubat is a Jewish synagogue located at 14 Rue Chasseloup-Laubat in Paris' 15th arrondissement. The synagogue is associated with the Israelite Central Consistory of France.

It is one of the last synagogues built according to designs developed during the 19th century in France, an era which saw the Emancipation of Jews and their greater integration into society. It is considered part of the "Golden Age of French Synagogues".

== History ==
At the beginning of the 20th century, a small Jewish oratory was located on Avenue de La Motte-Picquet in Paris' 15th arrondissement. This location proved to be insufficient to the needs of the community, which had already been there about 50 years. On May 21 and November 15, 1910, the Consistory of Paris bought 754 square meters on Rue Chasseloup-Laubat, from widow Madame Grouselle, for 130,000 francs (equivalent to €608,000 in 2025). Baron Edmond de Rothschild, vice-president (and later president) of the Paris Consistory, took charge of the construction of the synagogue, spending 340,000 francs (equivalent to €1.6 million in 2025) and another 56,000 francs (equivalent to €262,000 in 2025) on the residential pavilion annex for the synagogue.

Architect Lucien Bechmann, who had already been chosen by Rothschild for the reconstruction of the Rothschild Hospital, was retained for construction of the synagogue. Relations between Rothschild and Bechmann were so difficult that Bechmann tried to retire multiple times, but J. Wormser, a colleague of Rothschild arrived each time to persuade him to stay. As early as 1910, Bechmann had developed several sketches for the synagogue, but it wasn't until November 1911 that J. Wormser told him that his last plan had received the approval of the Baron.

Great success. "Saint Sophie" is pleased. It is in that sense that your study must be continued quickly.

Grand succès. Sainte Sophie a plu. C'est dans ce sens qu'il faut rapidement poursuivre votre étude

— J. Wormser to Lucien Bechmann

Like the Synagogue of Boulogne Billancourt, also financed by Baron Rothschild, but designed by architect Emmanuel-Élisée Pontremoli, and consecrated September 21, 1912, the synagogue was designed in a Byzantine style.

The permits for construction were obtained September 26, 1912 and a year later on September 29, 1913, the synagogue was officially consecrated during the High Holy Days. In his speech the Chief Rabbi of Paris, Jacques-Henri Dreyfuss, thanked the Baron for his donation, as well as Bechmann, who he compared to Bezalel, chief architect of the Tabernacle.

In 1914, Marcel Sachs, Rabbi at the Synagogue of Saint-Étienne, was named rabbi of the Synagogue of Chasseloup-Laubat. He remained in that position until his retirement in 1958. During the Second World War, Sachs was able to escape to Lyon, in Vichy France, to rejoin the new seat of the Consistory and the Chief Rabbinate of France, by boarding a locomotive disguised as a railway worker.

Rabbi David Feuerwerker succeeded Sachs, then Rabbi Alain Goldmann. Since 2014, the rabbi has been Mikaël Journo.

On May 4, 2009, in the presence of the Chief Rabbi of France and the Jewish chaplain for the French Armed Forces, the Synagogue of Chasseloup-Laubat was consecrated during a military ceremony, as a synagogue for the armies.

== Architecture ==
While most large consistorial synagogues constructed 30-35 previously had their main entrance directly on the street (like the Grand Synagogue of Paris (1874), Synagogue des Tournelles (1876) and the Rue Buffault Synagogue (1877)), Lucien Bechmann designed the synagogue in the Byzantine style, with an entrance through a courtyard.

The synagogue was planned with a square design. The narthex allowed access to the gallery for women as well as two annex rooms serving as an oratory during the week and the other as a social hall and meeting room.

The building was constructed of different sizes that are perfectly discernable from the outside. The entrance and the annex halls are located in a rectangular avant-corps, pierced by semi-circular arched windows, each separated by small columns forming an arcade, and in the middle of the room is a porch supported by two black marble columns, topped by a gable crowned with the Ten Commandments. The avant-corps is followed by a small semi-cylindrical volume which allows entry into the sanctuary.

For the exterior of the building, Bechmann decided to use beige bricks with a white stone added for the corner quoins, the rosettes, the arcades and the modillons. The sanctuary, a square room, has three walls that are pierced an eight-sided rosette at top of the first floor, mounting a wooden roof lantern. The interior of the synagogue distinguished itself from other synagogues built during this period because of its wooden frame and slender wooden posts holding the gallery and balustrades, also made out of wood. The 13 square meter room is about 15 meters high at the top of the small Cupola. The women's gallery made of wood, is located on the first floor, covering three sides of the room.

For the decoration of the synagogue, Bechmann initially had considered various decorative motifs like interlacing, stars, and rosettes, but preferred a more sober decorative style, limiting himself to the Star of David, which can be found on the capitals of the two columns on either side of the porch, on the mosaic above the tympanum leading to the sanctuary, the chandeliers, the woodwork, and the stained-glass windows.

The Hebrew date Elul 5673 (September 29, 1913, the date of the consecration of the synagogue) is inscribed on the tympanum above the door leading to the sanctuary.

The wooden Torah ark, located on the wall opposite the entrance, is simply designed, possessing no ornamentation except a Star of David sculpted in bas-relief on the ark. The Ten Commandments are mounted above the ark and are also made of wood. Like most synagogues built during this era, the Bimah is located in front of the ark and not at the center of the room like in other Orthodox synagogues (like Sephardic synagogues).

The colored stained-glass windows of the large rosette windows as well as the semi-circular arched windows located under the smaller rosette windows provide natural light in warm colors. Candlesticks, chandeliers and wall lights with glass shapes specifically designed by the architect, complete the lighting in the building.

In 2011, the building received the label of "Heritage of the 20th Century".

== Gallery ==
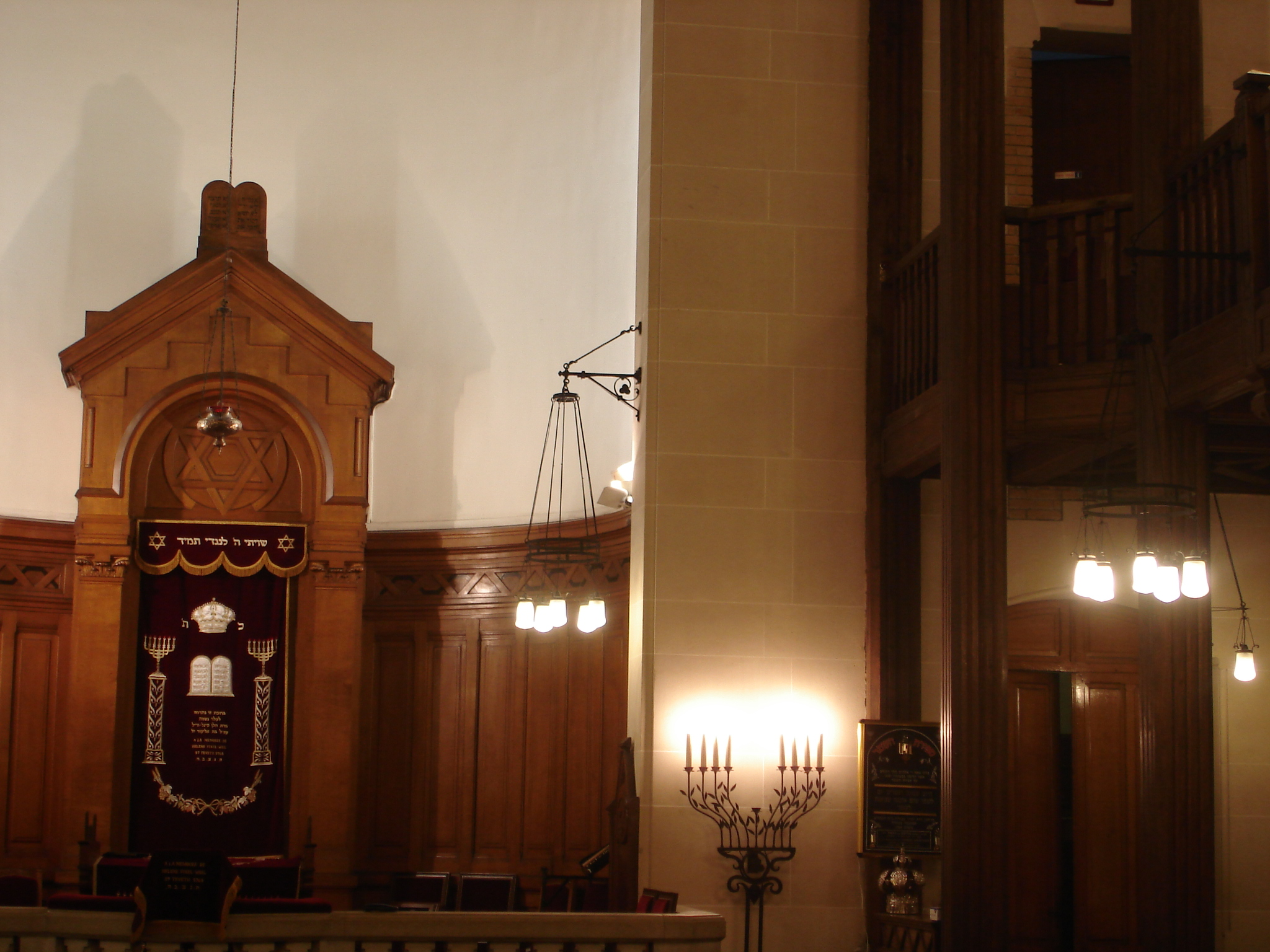
The Torah ark, lamps, and lanterns

== See also ==
- History of the Jews in France
- List of synagogues in France
- David Feuerwerker
- Alain Goldmann

== Bibliography ==
- Dominique Jarassé, Guide du patrimoine juif parisien, Parigramme, 2003.
