= Cnova =

E-commerce company

Cnova N.V.
- Type: Public
- Traded as: Nasdaq: CNV
- Industry: e-commerce
- Founded: 2014
- Headquarters: Amsterdam, Netherlands; São Paulo, Brazil
- Key people: Jean-Charles Naouri, CEO and Chairman
- Revenue: 3.42 billion euros (2015)
- Owner: Groupe Casino (98.96%)
- Number of employees: 5,500 (2015)
- Website: cnovagroup.com/en/

Cnova N.V. is an e-commerce company, founded in June 2014. Cnova includes Cdiscount (operating in France, Belgium, Ivory Coast, Senegal and Colombia) and Cnova Brazil (operating in Brazil). Cnova N.V. is part of Groupe Casino, a French global retail company of which Mr. Jean-Charles Naouri is currently the chairman and CEO. Since November 2015, Peter Paul Estermann is the chairman of the board of Cnova N.V.

In 2015, the total sales of Cnova N.V. reached 4.835 billion euros and its total revenue reached 3.42 billion euros. At the end of 2014, Cnova counted 13.6 million active customers in the world.

== History ==
The first operations began in 1998 with the founding of the e-commerce website Cdiscount, a single website focused on offering CDs and DVDs.

Cdiscount then expanded its business to encompass product categories such as consumer electronics, computers, home appliances and wine.

In 2008, the companies Pontofrio.com and eHub were launched in Brazil, providing e-commerce services to third-party retailers.

The Brazilian expansion continued in 2010 by adding the Extra.com.br and CasasBahia.com.br websites to the portfolio, and the creation of business unit focused on business-to-business wholesale called Pontofrio Atacado. In 2011, Cdiscount implemented its first marketplace and launched ComptoirSante.com, an e-commerce website dedicated to beauty products.

During the year 2012, two new websites were launched in Brazil. An online marketplace was also created on the Extra.com.br website in Brazil.

2014, Cnova, a global e-commerce company with a total gross merchandise volume of $4.9 billion, was created through a joint venture between Casino, GPA, Via Varejo and Exito. Cnova will be directly owned 46.5% by Casino (including its subsidiary Exito) and 53.5% indirectly by GPA, Via Varejo and certain founding shareholders of Nova Pontocom.

2014 saw the merger of both French and Brazilian e-commerce activities under the Cnova umbrella, as well as the Cdiscount expansion in Colombia, Ivory Coast, Belgium and Senegal.

In November 2023, Brazil's GPA sold a 34% stake of Cnova to Casino Group for €10 million.

== Presentation ==
The current geographies represent over 500 million people with Cnova sites in France, Brazil, Colombia, Ivory Coast, Belgium and Senegal, and operations in Brazil under the sites Extra.com.br, Pontofrio.com and Casasbahia.com.br. It operates B2B solutions, such as the eCommerce solution eHub, and niche sites both in France and Brazil, with Comptoirsante.com, Moncornerdeco.com, or Barateiro.com.

Cnova has established itself as an eCommerce market leader in France and Brazil. Through the direct sales websites and its marketplaces, Cnova offers home appliances, consumer electronics, computers, home furnishings, leisure and personal goods and differentiated delivery and payment options.

== Subsidiaries ==
=== Cdiscount ===
Cdiscount is a French company created in 1999. It has been part of Casino Group since 2000. As the first e-commerce website in France, Cdiscount offers a wide range of products including, among others, cultural goods, high-tech, IT, household appliances, personal appliances and food.

Cdiscount also operates in Brazil, Belgium, Ivory Coast, Senegal and Colombia.

In 2015, Cdiscount employed 1,400 people and had a turnover of 1.764 billion euros.

=== Cnova Brazil ===
Cnova Brazil, now integrated into Via Varejo businesses, was specialized in e-commerce activities throughout the country. Its creation follows the merger of the online activities of Casas Bahia, Ponto Frio and Extra, a hypermarket chain belonging to the Brazilian group Pão de Açúcar, the leading national retailer in Brazil. Cnova Brazil structured its e-commerce services through three main B2C websites – extra.com.br, casasbahia.com.br and pontofrio.com – as well as B2B services through Pontofrio Atacado and its eHub platform.

Cnova Brazil was a major e-commerce player in Brazil with a turnover of 1.655 billion euros in 2015.

== Management ==
=== Executive committee ===
- Emmanuel Grenier: CEO and Executive Director of Cnova
- Stéphane Brunel: Chief Financial Officer of Cnova and Cdiscount
