= Catalina Maya =

Colombian model, broadcaster and businesswoman

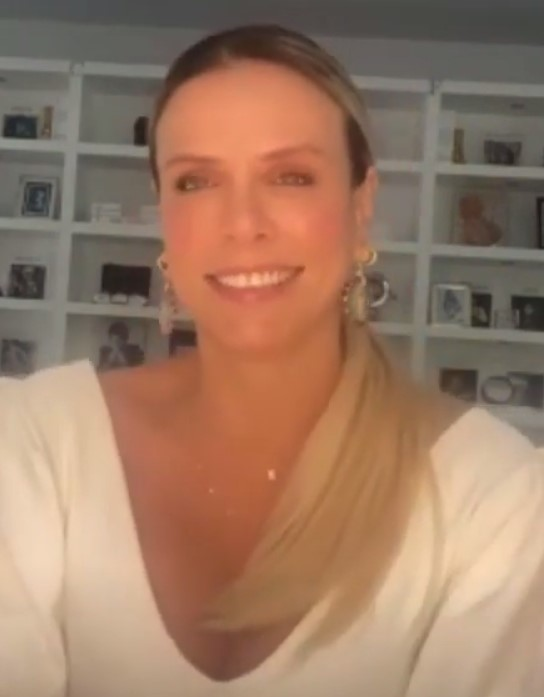
- Catalina Maya in 2020.
- Born: Catalina Maya Arango; July 28, 1980 (age 46); Betulia, Colombia
- Occupations: Model, television actress, broadcaster, businesswoman
- Years active: 1993–present
- Spouses: Adrián Fernández (m. 2005; div. 2012) Felipe Pimiento (m. 2018)
- Children: 2
- Modeling information
- Hair color: Blond
- Eye color: Green

Catalina Maya Arango (born July 28, 1980, in Betulia, Antioquia, Colombia), known professionally as Catalina Maya, is a Colombian model, broadcaster and businesswoman.

== Early life and education ==
Maya grew up in Medellín, Antioquia, Colombia, where she attended San José de Las Vegas school. She studied Social Communication and Journalism from 1998 to 2004 at the Pontifical Bolivarian University. In 2000 she interned for a semester at the press office in Casa de Nariño, the Colombian presidential house.

== Career ==
=== Modeling ===
She began her modeling career at age thirteen when she accompanied Catalina Gómez to the InForma casting agency, in Medellín. The casting directors invited her to be part of the presentation, from which she was chosen for the campaign for Almacenes Éxito. Afterwards, Maya started receiving offers to model for television commercials and brands in Colombia and other countries. In Colombia, she is widely remembered for her photos which appeared on the cover of student notebooks in the late 1990s and early 2000s.

Maya has appeared in more than 300 campaigns throughout her career.

=== Television and radio ===
Maya worked at W Radio (Colombia) in 2004, at the time she met her first husband. She returned to W Radio in 2012, working from Monday to Friday from 5pm to 8pm at La Hora del Regreso (The Comeback Time). At the age of seventeen she started to frequently make special coverings for Caracol Radio. She has played minor roles in television soap operas such as Padres e Hijos (Parents and Children). In January and February 2019, she appeared in The agency: Battle of the models, in which she directed one of the competing teams of models. Since August 2019, she has been invited to the Despierta America morning show in Univision Network, for weekly appearances on the segment Sin Rollo (Without Issue).

=== Youtuber ===
In October 2019 Catalina launched her YouTube channel ‘Bueno, Bonito y Barato’ (Good, Nice and Cheap) where she gives tips and hacks for beauty, cleaning and more.

=== Business ===
Several times a year, Maya hosts a design fair called "Los Bazares de Catalina Maya" to promote new Latin-American designers.

== Personal life ==
She is the youngest of three sisters. On March 11, 2005, Catalina Maya married Adrián Fernández, a racing car driver. They had two children together. In 2012, they separated by mutual agreement. On March 17, 2018, after four years of relationship, she married businessman Felipe Pimiento.

In 2005, she put her modeling career on pause to be a mother until 2012 when she returned to live in Miami.

== Filmography ==
=== Television ===
Year	Title	Role	Notes
2001	Padres e Hijos	Herself	Special appearance
2001	Amor Discos	Miss Bolivia	Special appearance
2001	Yo soy Betty, la fea	Herself	Special appearance
2001	Los Elegidos	Herself	Special appearance
2002	Bla Bla Bla	Herself	Special appearance

=== Reality Shows ===
Year	Title	Role
2004	La granja Tolima	Herself
2019	The agency: Battle of the models	Director of competing group of models

=== Model ===
- Johnson & Johnson
- Palmolive
- Trident (gum)
- Coca-Cola
- Aguila
- Carulla
- Cromos
