= Bechmann =

Bechmann is a surname. Notable people with this surname include:

- Christoph Bechmann (born 1971), German field hockey player
- Lucien Bechmann (1880–1968), French architect
- Tommy Bechmann (born 1981), Danish footballer
- Walter Bechmann (1887–1967), German actor

== See also ==
- 5024 Bechmann, outer main-belt asteroid
