= Gabriel Naouri =

French CEO and entrepreneur (born 1981)

- Born: July 6, 1981 (age 45)
- Education: Paris Dauphine University
- Occupation: Businessman
- Years active: 2004–

Gabriel Naouri (born July 6, 1981) is a French CEO and entrepreneur, founder and CEO of Majorelle Investments (co-controlled with Apollo Capital Management). He was previously co-founder and Chairman of Yandex.Market, and deputy head of international operations of Groupe Casino.

== Biography ==
=== Education ===
Gabriel Naouri graduated from the Paris Dauphine University (France) with a master's degree in applied mathematics. He later enrolled in the “Global Leadership and Public Policy” program at Harvard University in 2011. Gabriel Naouri is a certified board member from Sciences Po Paris and NYSE Euronext.

=== Early career ===
In 2004, Gabriel Naouri joined the M&A department of Rothschild & Cie Banque in New York City.

He then became a marketing manager in the Consumer Products division of L’Oréal USA Garnier in New York City.

=== Groupe Casino ===
Gabriel Naouri joined Groupe Casino in 2007. Since his start at Groupe Casino, he went through different operational stages alike the Michelin model. He started at a Géant Casino Hypermarket in Rennes, where he held different positions. successively as baker, butcher, checkout employee, cleaner, etc. Throughout those training years, Gabriel Naouri attended the traditional Casino training program at the Group headquarters in Saint-Etienne. After becoming fruits and vegetables section manager at Géant Casino of Mandelieu-La-Napoule, he was successively appointed as executive director at the Géant Casino of Fenouillet (Toulouse) and then as head of operations of the hypermarket division in France.

In June 2012, Gabriel Naouri was appointed head of brand, digital, and innovation of the Casino Group in France. He led the group's first foray in augmented reality, NFC technology, and drive-ins.

From 2014 to 2017, he served as Deputy head of international operations (12 000 stores) of Groupe Casino where he was responsible for the launch and coordination of international action plans in line with the group strategy. He has created and launched Cdiscount in Thailand and Vietnam. In 2017, he was involved with private equity fund Advent International in the potential acquisition of The Body Shop. Naouri left the Groupe Casino in July 2017.

=== New technology ===
After leaving the Groupe Casino, Gabriel Naouri became a senior advisor to Motoya Okada, CEO of the Japanese retail and financial services company Æon. He personally invested in the medical apparel company Jaanuu, and the ecommerce website Boxed.com. In 2018, he co-founded the ecommerce company Yandex.Market and raised $500 million to launch it. He sold his shares of Yandex.Market to Yandex' CEO and founder Arkady Volozh in June 2020 for $1.5 billion.

=== Maisons du Monde ===
In August 2020, Majorelle Investments – an investment holding company co-controlled by Gabriel Naouri and Daniel Kretinsky – announced owning more than 5% of furniture and home decor company Maisons du Monde.

In March 2021, Majorelle Investments announced owning more than 10% of the company.

In November 2021, Gabriel Naouri and Apollo Global Management bought back Daniel Kretinsky's stake in Majorelle Investments.

In March 2022, Majorelle Investments announced owning more than 16% of Maisons du Monde. In June 2023, Majorelle reached 25% of ownership in Maisons du Monde and Naouri was appointed to the board of the company.

In January 2025, through his investment company Sana Holdings, Naouri bought a controlling stake in the American clothing company True Religion.

== Honours ==
- Elected Young Global Leader in 2008 by the World Economic Forum (2008)
- Named among the 30 most influential people in their 30s by the Optimum Magazine (2009, 2010, 2011, 2012)
- Named among the 100 economic leaders of tomorrow by Le Figaro Magazine (2013, 2014, 2015, 2016, 2017, 2018, 2019, 2020, 2021)
