= Carulla =

Colombian supermarket chain

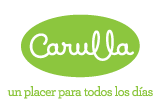
- Industry: Supermarket
- Founded: 1905
- Parent: Almacenes Exito
- Website: www.carulla.com

For people with the surname, see Carulla (surname).

Carulla is a Colombian supermarket chain owned by Grupo Éxito and headquartered in Bogotá, Colombia. It was founded in 1905, and now is one of the largest supermarket companies in the country. Founded in the city of Barranquilla, it soon moved most of its operations and headquarters to Bogota.

Carulla has associated its brand with quality products, specializing in fruits and vegetables, although it offers most of the product categories offered in any other supermarket chain. It currently considers its destination categories to be fruits and vegetables, meats, spirits and liquors, and bakery products.

In 2000 it merged with Almacenes Vivero supermarket chain based in Barranquilla, its then-rival which was most prevalent on the Atlantic coast. The merger formed Carulla Vivero S.A. and became the second largest retail chain in Colombia

As of 2006, the Carulla Vivero operated 156 stores; 83 of operated under the Carulla brand.

As of 2006 Carulla Vivero was acquired by Almacenes Exito the largest supermarket company in Colombia, which is and owned by French retailer Groupe Casino.

The Carulla brand will continue to exist after the merger since it has over 100 years of history and holds a strong market participation in Bogota, Medellin, Cartagena, and Barranquilla. The brand's motto is "Carulla, an everyday pleasure".

Carulla was also the first retailer in Colombia to use a loyalty card which currently has about 250,000 members, called the Supercliente Card. The top 45,000 customers have the Diamond Superliente Card as they represent about 65% of the company's profits. Currently it was 98 stores nationwide. Additionally it has the option of delivering groceries to homes or pick up

== Note ==
1. "Food Industry Research Center (subscription)". Colombian Retailer, Watt International Extend Relationship.
