= Baack =

Baack is a Frisian surname, a diminutive of the French surname Baud. Notable people with the surname include:

- Lawrence J. Baack (born 1943), American historian
- Steve Baack (born 1960), American football player
- Tom Baack (born 1999), German football player
