= Jean-Yves Naouri =

French political advisor and businessman (born 1959)

- Born: 19 November 1959 (age 66); Bône, French Algeria
- Education: École Polytechnique; École des Mines
- Occupation: Business executive
- Children: 1 son, 2 daughters
- Relatives: Jean-Charles Naouri (brother); Gabriel Naouri (nephew)

Jean-Yves Naouri (born 1959) is a French political advisor and businessman. He is the former chief operating officer of Publicis. He is the founder of JYN Consulting.

== Early life ==
Jean-Yves Naouri was born on 19 November 1959 in Bône, French Algeria (now Algeria). His brother, Jean-Charles Naouri, is the majority shareholder, chairman and CEO of Groupe Casino. Their family was Jewish; their father was a paediatrician. They emigrated to mainland France as children.

Naouri graduated from the École Polytechnique in 1979, followed by the École des Mines.

== Career ==
Naouri started his career as a Corps des mines, where he worked in the oil industry. He was appointed as an advisor to Dominique Strauss-Kahn, the Minister of Industry and Foreign Trade, in 1991.

Naouri joined Publicis as a founding partner of its Publicis Consultants subsidiary in 1993. He was subsequently promoted as president of Publicis Conseil, its advertising agency, and later oversaw its operations in the Nordics, Germany, Belgium, The Netherlands and Luxembourg. He served as the chief operating officer of Publicis from 2010 to 2014. He also served as the CEO of Publicis Worldwide from March 2011 to October 2013. He served on the board of directors of Publicis until September 2014. In 2015, he sued Publicis for 20 million euros after they failed to give him his golden parachute; he lost the lawsuit in 2016.

Naouri is the founder of JYN Consulting, a consulting firm.

== Personal life ==
Naouri is married. He has a son and two daughters.
