= Baud (disambiguation) =

Baud may refer to:

- Baud, symbols per second or pulses per second

People:

- Alf Baud (1892–1986), Australian rules footballer
- Auguste Baud-Bovy (1848–1949), Swiss painter
- Frédéric Baud (born 1975), French Nordic combined skier who competed from 1993 to 2004
- Jean Baud (businessman) (1919–2012), French businessman
- Jean Chrétien Baud (1789–1859), Governor-General of the Dutch East Indies from 1833 until 1836
- Jean-Jacques Baud (born 1947), French former sports shooter
- Jacques Baud (born 1955), a former colonel in the Swiss Army
- Marcelle Baud (1890–1987), French Egyptologist and artist
- Michel Baud (1963–2012), French Egyptologist, head of the Nubian Sudan section in the Department of Egyptian Antiquities of the Louvre Museum

Places:

- Baud, Morbihan, commune in the Morbihan département in Brittany in north-western France

== See also ==
- Musée Baud, music-box museum in the Swiss village of L'Auberson in the Jura Mountains in the canton of Vaud
- Émile Baudot (1845–1903), French engineer and inventor, after whom the telecommunications unit of baud is named
