= Alain Goldmann =

French rabbi (1931–2022)

Chief Rabbi of Paris
- In office 1981–1994
- Preceded by: Rahamim Naouri
- Succeeded by: David Messas

Personal details
- Born: 14 September 1931 Strasbourg, France
- Died: 4 September 2022 (aged 90) Paris, France
- Education: Israelite Seminary of France
- Occupation: Rabbi

Alain Goldmann (14 September 1931 – 4 September 2022) was a French rabbi.

== Biography ==
Goldmann completed his rabbinical studies at the Israelite Seminary of France. He became rabbi of Bordeaux and of the Synagogue Belleville in the 20th arrondissement of Paris. Later, he was the rabbi of the Synagogue Chasseloup-Laubat in the 15th arrondissement of Paris. From 1981 to 1994, he was Chief Rabbi of Paris.

He represented the French rabbinate at the Comité consultatif national d'éthique and at the Conference of European Rabbis. In 2009, he became a member of the Commission nationale consultative des droits de l'homme, where he co-signed a minority opinion against same-sex marriage in Switzerland.

Alain Goldmann died in Paris on 4 September 2022, at the age of 90.

== Decorations ==
- Grand Officer of the Legion of Honour (2012)
