= Jean Baud (businessman) =

Jean Baud (7 November 1919, Choisy-le-Roi - 16 July 2012, Blonville-sur-Mer), was the founder of the Leader Price and Franprix retail brands, today part of Groupe Casino, though the Baud family retains 25% of the hard-discount chain, Leader Price, and 5% of Marché Franprix.

In 1990, with Leader Price, he was the first French retailer to take on the German "hard discount" chains, like Aldi and Lidl, then expanding into France.

His book, Coup de tonnerre dans la grande distribution, was published in 2008.
