= Jean-Charles Naouri =

French businessman (born 1949)

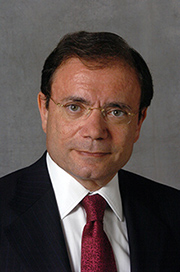
- Born: 8 March 1949 (age 77); Bône, Algeria
- Education: Lycée Louis-le-Grand
- Alma mater: École normale supérieure, Harvard University, École nationale d'administration
- Occupation: Businessman
- Known for: CEO of Groupe Casino
- Children: 4, Gabriel Naouri, Emmanuelle Naouri, Joseph Naouri, Mickaël Naouri
- Relatives: Jean-Yves Naouri (brother)

Jean-Charles Naouri (born 8 March 1949) is a French businessman. He is chairman, chief executive officer and controlling shareholder of Groupe Casino.

== Education ==
Naouri received his Baccalauréat degree at only 15 years old. He then studied Mathematics and Physics in classes préparatoires at the Lycée Louis-le-Grand before entering the École Normale Supérieure in 1967. He also attended Harvard University, before returning in France and completing a PhD in mathematics in only one year. He is also an alumnus of the Ecole Nationale d’Administration (1974-1976).

== Early career ==
In 1987, Jean-Charles Naouri left government service and joined Rothschild & Cie Banque as Managing Partner. Around the same time, he established his own investment fund, Euris, which acquired minority equity investments in industrial companies, while increasing its investment capabilities.

== Career ==
=== Rallye ===
In 1991 he acquired the Brittany-based retailer Rallye, which at the time was facing serious cash flow issues/challenges. Convinced of the future potential for retailing and the benefits of combining the two companies, in 1992 he engineered a merger of Rallye with Groupe Casino, thereby becoming Groupe Casino's largest shareholder.

=== Groupe Casino ===
In 1997, a hostile takeover bid for Groupe Casino by rival retailer Promodès was thwarted by the successful counter offer from Jean-Charles Naouri, the Guichard family and Casino management, thereby maintaining the Group's independence.

In March 2005, Jean-Charles Naouri became chairman and chief executive officer of Casino Group,

In France, Jean-Charles Naouri has refocused French operations in the convenience format segment, Groupe Casino's core business, and also positioned Casino in the discount segment by developing the Leader Price chain and the Cdiscount e-commerce website acquired in 2000.

In 2012, Groupe Casino acquired a controlling interest in Brazilian retailer Pão de Açúcar, the country's largest private-sector employer. The Group also purchased the 50% of French retailer Monoprix, which it did not already own, becoming the sole shareholder.

== Other positions ==
In addition to his business activities, Jean-Charles Naouri is also the founder of the Euris Foundation, which he created in 2000. Each year, the Foundation grants 40 scholarships to promising high school graduates from impoverished neighbourhoods in France.

He is also vice chairman of the Groupe Casino corporate foundation, which he founded in 2009 to improve access to culture and knowledge for children who are disadvantaged or suffering from illness. In addition, he is Honorary Chairman and Trustee of Ecole Normale Supérieure's Institut d’Expertise et de Prospective, which is responsible for developing ties between the school and the corporate world.

In June 2013, Jean-Charles Naouri was appointed by France's Ministry of Foreign Affairs to be a special representative for Economic relations with Brazil.
