= Leader Price =

French discount store

- Type: Subsidiary
- Industry: Retail
- Founded: 1986; 40 years ago
- Founder: Jean Baud
- Headquarters: Gretz-Armainvilliers, France
- Parent: Groupe Casino
- Website: leaderprice.mg leaderprice.re

Leader Price, (full name: Société S.A. Leader Price Holding), is a French discount store chain of the Groupe Casino, headquartered in Paris, France.

The group has 27 supermarkets in Réunion Island and Madagascar.

The chain sold 545 directly owned stores in France in 2020. In its results for the first half of 2024, the Casino group announced that the franchise activities are part of the discontinued operations in France.

== History ==
Former logo used from 2010 until 2017, which is still used outside France.

In September 1989, Leader Price was created after the opening of the first store in Paris by Jean Baud and Albert Baussan. From 1989, the chain primarily extended in Paris, with the American group TLC Beatrice becoming the main shareholder.

In September 1997, the Casino group took over Leader Price, with 250 stores (and Franprix, 400 stores) from TLC Beatrice, and opened Leader Price in Belgium.

In March 2010, the chain modernized and changed its logo to a more simple one. Leader Price had over 500 stores in France in 2013.

In December 2020, Casino Group sold to Aldi 545 supermarkets and three warehouses of Leader Price and another 2 Casino supermarkets in France for €717 million. Aldi closed 31 Leader Price stores, while the rest have been integrated into Aldi by the end of 2021.

On 23 May 2019, Rallye S.A., owner of Groupe Casino, declared bankruptcy protection in an effort to maintain its high debt costs. Casino later announced that same day that the bankruptcy would not affect any of their subsidiaries and that operations would continue normally.

In 2023, Casino announced that they have completed a deal to avoid bankruptcy. This restructuring procedure would allow for the company to cut high debt and improve recent losses to other rival supermarket corporations. In 2024, Casino USA filed for Chapter 15 bankruptcy.

In its results for the first half of 2024, the Casino group announced that the Leader Price franchise activities are part of the discontinued operations in France.

== Location ==
The group has 27 supermarkets in Réunion Island and Madagascar.

=== Africa ===
- Reunion Island: 18 supermarkets
- Madagascar: 9 supermarkets

== See also ==
- Sherpa (brand)
