= Big C Vietnam =

Big C Supercenter operates "hypermarkets" or "supercenters", modern retail businesses managed by Groupe Casino.It is one of the major retailers in the world, with over 200,000 employees working in more than 11,000 stores in Vietnam, Thailand, Argentina, Uruguay, Brazil, Colombia, France, Madagascar, and Mauritius.

Big C works with local manufacturers to develop their own brands, including "Wow! Attractive Price", "Bakery by Big C" and "Big C".

It is one of the largest shopping centers in Vietnam, with three supermarkets in the center of Vietnam, nine supermarkets in the north, and 10 locations in the south. Most items in Big C are made in Vietnam.

== Export activities ==
The Export Department in Đồng Nai Province has exported local commodities, especially to Groupe Casino's members. In 2009, Big C Vietnam exported nearly 1,000 containers of commodities worth US$17 million.

== Locations ==
Big C has 36 stores throughout Vietnam.
