= Franprix =

French grocery store chain

- Company type: Subsidiary
- Industry: Retail
- Founded: 1958; 68 years ago
- Founder: Jean Baud
- Headquarters: Paris, France
- Area served: France
- Key people: François Alarcon (CEO)
- Parent: Groupe Casino
- Subsidiaries: Leader Price
- Website: franprix.fr

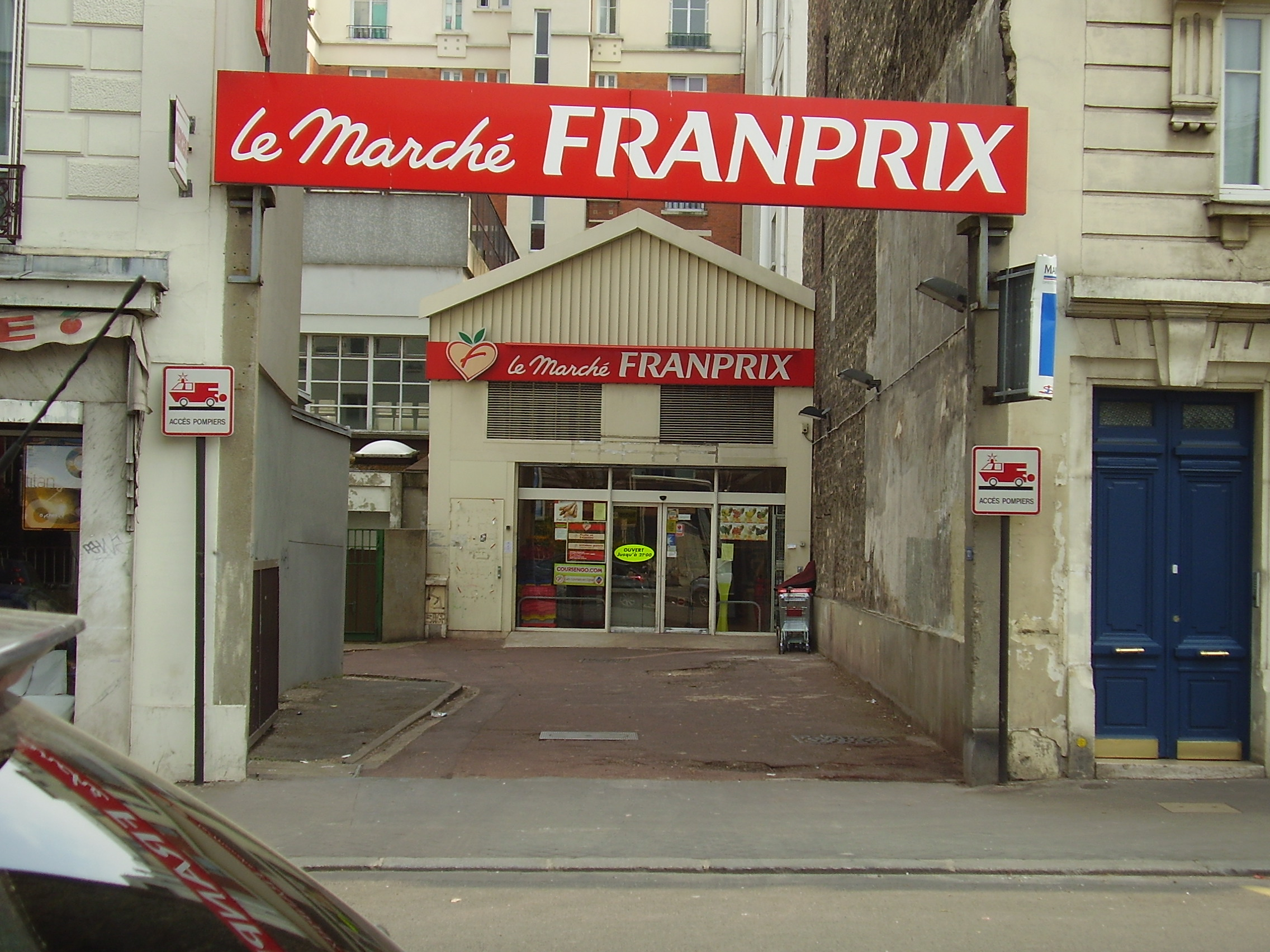
A location in Paris

Franprix is a French grocery store chain of the Groupe Casino, headquartered in Paris.

== History ==
The Franprix brand was created in 1958 by Jean Baud, son of grocers from Choisy-le-Roi. Franprix consists of convenience stores under 500 m^{2}, concentrated in Paris and the inner suburbs of the Île-de-France region: a sector that supermarkets (often located on the outskirts of urban areas) were unable to fully satisfy. The Casino group acquired a stake in the company in 1997, and increased its stake year by year until 2007, by which time it held all the shares. It then took control of Franprix's operational management.

Franprix now has 641 stores. At the same time, Franprix expanded into other major French cities, with the first store outside the Île-de-France region opening in Lyon in 2004. In 2012, Franprix entered into a partnership with logistics provider XPO, Inc. to deliver its 300 Paris stores by river, to avoid traffic on the streets of Paris.

In 2013, Franprix launched its first store on a freeway service area, its first loyalty program ("Ma Carte Franprix") and a charity operation, "L'Arrondi", which enables customers to round up their sales receipt to the nearest euro and donate the difference to charities.

In March 2015, after testing several new logos in its Paris stores, Franprix changed its visual identity, adopting a mandarin-shaped logo.

In 2016, Franprix signed a partnership with Western Union, to install its money transfer terminals in stores. The benefit for Franprix is that Western Union's customers - who are often regulars, as half of them are immigrant workers who send part of their wages to their families back home - become store customers at the same time. Another partnership has been signed with the social enterprise Phénix to collect and redistribute unsold goods to local associations.

On 23 May 2019, Rallye S.A., owner of Groupe Casino, declared bankruptcy protection in an effort to maintain its high debt costs. Casino later announced that same day that the bankruptcy would not affect any of their subsidiaries and that operations would continue normally.

In 2023, Casino announced that they have completed a deal to avoid bankruptcy. This restructuring procedure would allow for the company to cut high debt and improve recent losses to other rival supermarket corporations. In 2024, Casino USA filed for Chapter 15 bankruptcy.

== See also ==
=== External links ===
- Franprix (in French)
