= Maisons du Monde =

French furniture and home decor company

- Type: Public limited company
- Traded as: Euronext: MDM; CAC Small
- Industry: Retail
- Founded: 1996
- Founder: Xavier Marie
- Headquarters: Vertou, France
- Area served: France, Italy, Spain, Belgium, Switzerland, Germany, Portugal, Austria, Netherlands, Algeria, Morocco, Réunion, Martinique
- Key people: François-Melchior de Polignac (CEO)
- Products: Furniture, home décor, tableware, lighting, sofas
- Revenue: ▼€1 billion (2024)
- Net income: ▼€-115.3 million (2024)
- Number of employees: 5,506 (2024)
- Website: www.maisonsdumonde.com

Maisons du Monde (French pronunciation: [mɛzõ dy mõd(ə)], Houses of the world) is a French furniture and home decor company founded in Brest in 1996 by Xavier Marie. As of 2023, Maisons du Monde has 349 stores in Europe of which 212 in France and more than 5,500 employees. Sales made abroad represents 45% of the Maisons du Monde group's sales, and half of total sales are made online. Maisons du Monde sells approximately 58% of decorations and 42% of furniture.

== History ==
In 2006, Maisons du Monde launched its online shop and offered the whole of its catalogue of furniture and a large part of its objects of decoration. Maisons du Monde published a catalogue presenting its new collection at the beginning of the year.

The American business Bain Capital purchased the Maisons du Monde group in 2013 for €680 million (80%).

In 2015, it achieved a turnover of 699 million euros, of which 460 million were in France.

In February 2016, two US banks, Goldman Sachs and Citigroup, were mandated to prepare for an IPO.

In 2018, Maisons du Monde opened its first store in the United States, located in Wynwood, Florida. In 2019, Maisons du Monde opened a new store located in Aventura Mall, the third largest shopping mall in the United States.

In 2020, Maisons du Monde was hit by the Covid-19 crisis, but managed to hold its own above expectations. From January to June, sales fell by 13.3% to 489 million euros. Nevertheless, a second warehouse will open in early 2021 near the port of Le Havre to receive goods from Asia.

In late 2021, Maisons du Monde withdrew from the U.S. market by selling the majority of its shares in Modani, its American subsidiary, stating the decision would allow the company to fully refocus on Europe.

In 2023, Maisons du Monde ceased its online activities in the United Kingdom, with the company stopping new orders from May 24 of that year.

== Number of stores ==
As of year-end 2023, it had 349 direct stores in Europe.

Country	No. of stores
France	212
Italy	46
Spain	36
Belgium	21
Switzerland	13
Germany	11
Portugal	3
Luxembourg	2
Austria	1

Maisons du Monde also has franchise locations in Algeria, Morocco, Réunion, and Martinique. It sells its products online in the Netherlands as well. In the past, the company also operated stores in the United Kingdom and the United States.
