= Géant (hypermarket chain) =

French hypermarket chain owned by Casino Group

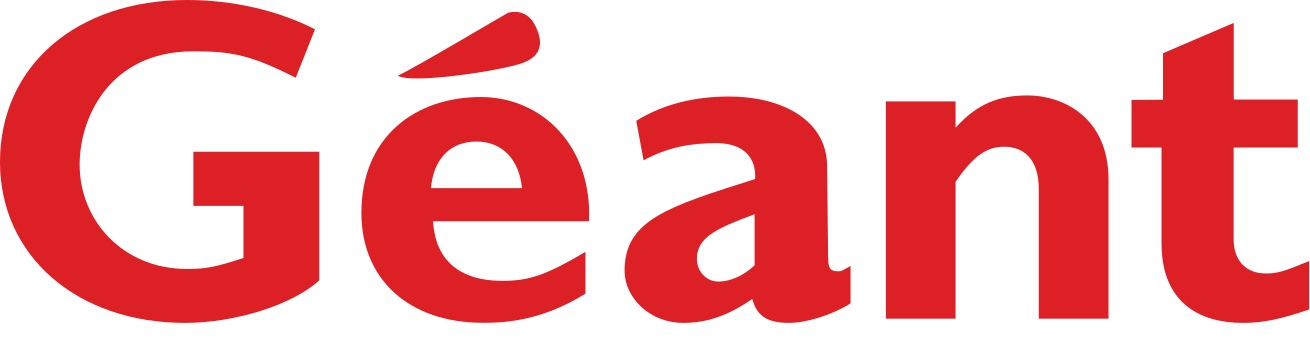
- Founded: 1970
- Headquarters: Saint-Étienne, France
- Products: Hypermarket
- Parent: Groupe Casino

Géant (French pronunciation: [ʒeɑ̃]) is a hypermarket chain based in Saint-Étienne, France, part of the French retailing giant Groupe Casino.

The chain is present in Middle East, Africa and South America.

Between June 2023 and October 2024, in the grip of a financial crisis linked to its debt, the group closed or sold all of its hypermarkets in France to competitors. During this crisis, the brand is also gradually being replaced by competitors in various countries.

== History ==
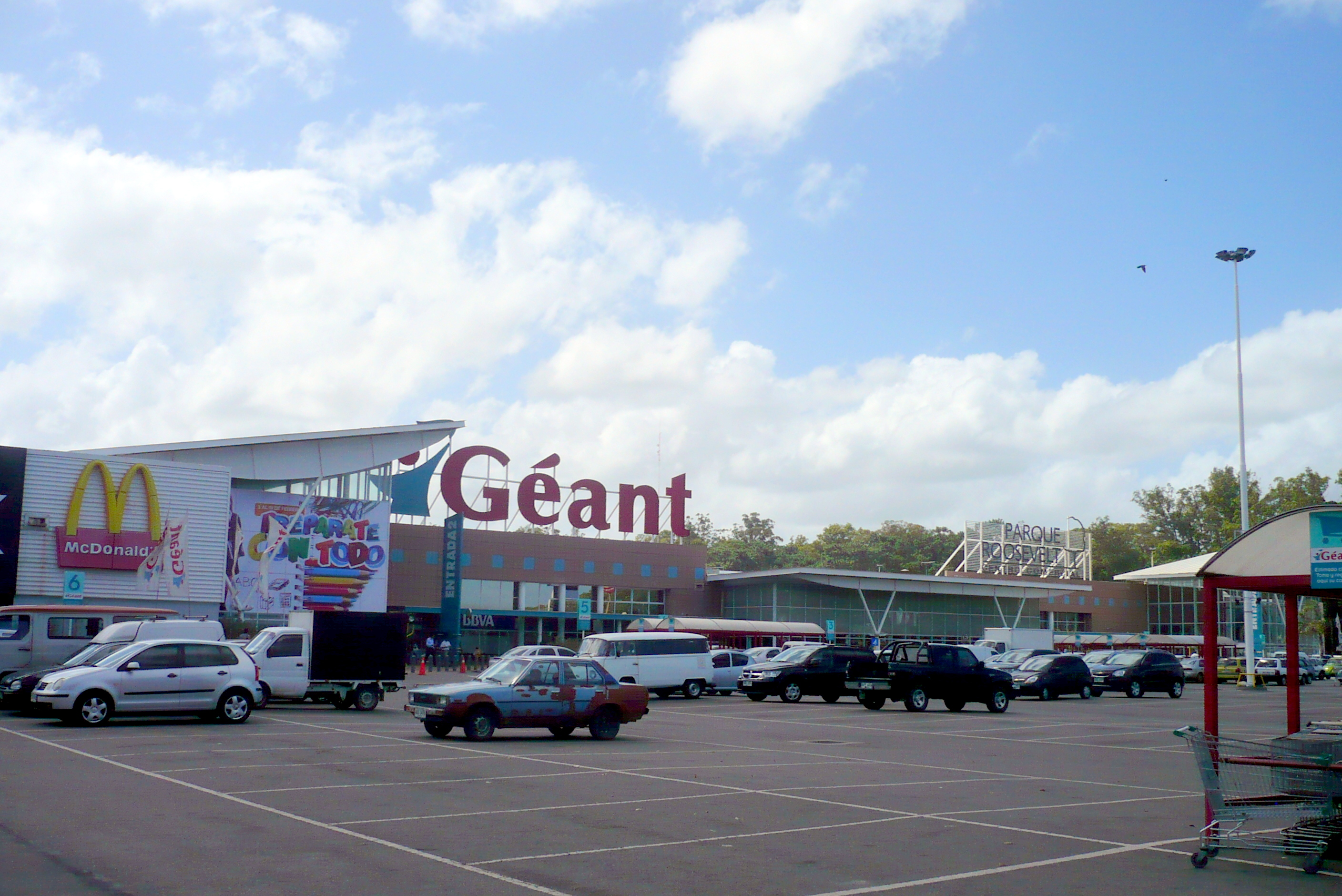
Géant in Ciudad de la Costa, Uruguay.

Géant opened its first hypermarket in 1970 in Marseille. In December 2015, Géant Casino had about 142 hypermarkets all over the world. The concept is, like most hypermarkets, to have all kinds of items available under one roof. A loyalty card system has been introduced by Géant, with a price discount on certain groceries.

In June 2022, with the aim of re-emphasizing the food side of hypermarkets, and after the transfer of 29 hypermarkets to the brand Casino Supermarchés. The Groupe Casino announce the discontinuation of the Géant brand in favor of the new brand Casino #hyperFrais in France.

For financial reasons, the group closed or sold all of its hypermarkets in France to competitors between June 2023 and October 2024.

In 2024, it announces that it will have 86 Géant.

== Locations ==
=== Middle East ===
- United Arab Emirates
- Yemen

=== Africa ===
- Tunisia
- Djibouti
- Libya
- Egypt

=== South America ===
- Uruguay

== Former locations ==
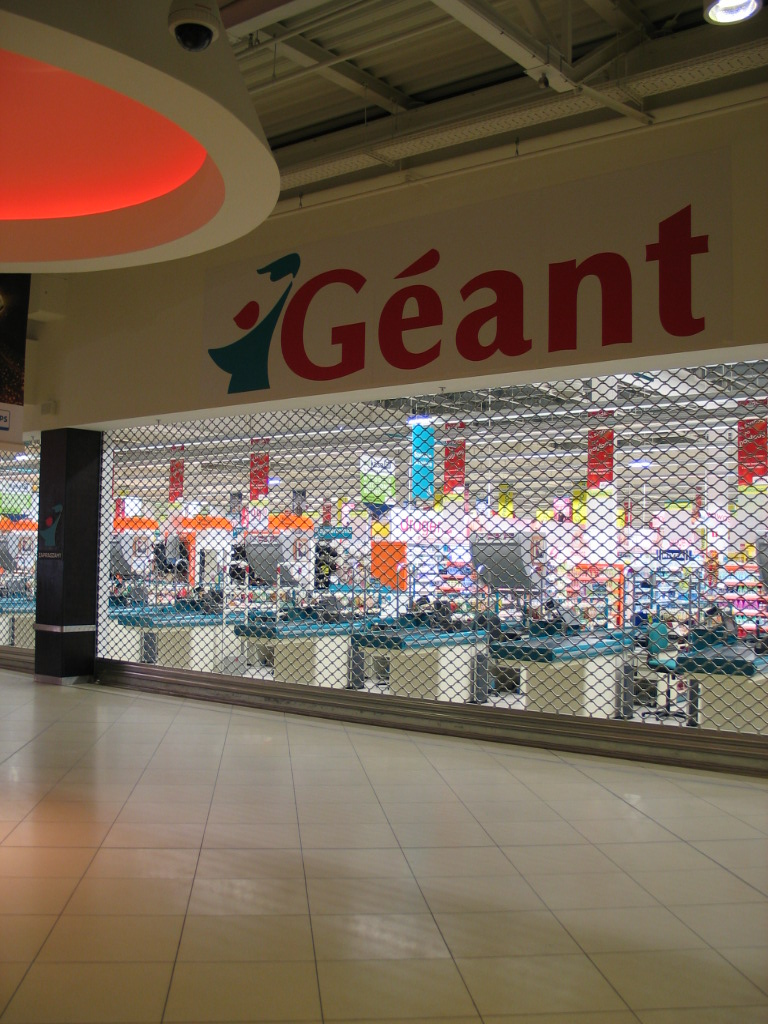
Casino Géant hypermarket in Poland.

- Taiwan: In September 2006, Groupe Casino sold its 50% stake in Géant, which was worth $738 million New Taiwan dollars, to Far Eastern Department Stores., the existing hypermarkets were renamed a.mart.
- Poland: Géant had nineteen hypermarkets in Poland, which were sold in late 2007 and early 2008 to the German company Metro AG and replaced with Real.
- Lebanon: Géant had one hypermarket in Lebanon which was bought in late 2008 by Sultan Trading Center and replaced by The Sultan Center.
- Saudi Arabia: Al Hokair Group operated several Géant stores in the kingdom until 2009 when it was sold to Saudi Savola, the owners of rival Panda.
- Kuwait, Bahrain and United Arab Emirates: Fu-Com joined with Groupe Casino to bring the Géant hypermarket brand to the Middle East where Géant opened its first store in Bahrain in May 2001. A store was opened in Dubai in 2005 and one in Abu Dhabi in 2015 at Yas Mall. Géant expanded its operations to Kuwait by opening a store in 2005 in Kuwait City. In 2017, Dubai-based Majid Al Futtaim Group bought 26 Geant hypermarkets in the UAE, Bahrain and Kuwait by acquiring the Geant franchise owner Retail Arabia from BMA International for an undisclosed amount. The acquired stores were rebranded as Carrefour and Carrefour Market for its supermarket branches.
- France: For financial reasons, the group closed or sold all of its hypermarkets in France to competitors between June 2023 and October 2024.
- Congo-Brazzaville, Gabon and Senegal: In 2023, Mercure International of Monaco began replacing Géant brands with Super U in Congo-Brazzaville, Gabon and Senegal.

== Visual history ==
1970 - 1992

1992 - 2007

2007–2015

2010–2015

2015–2023

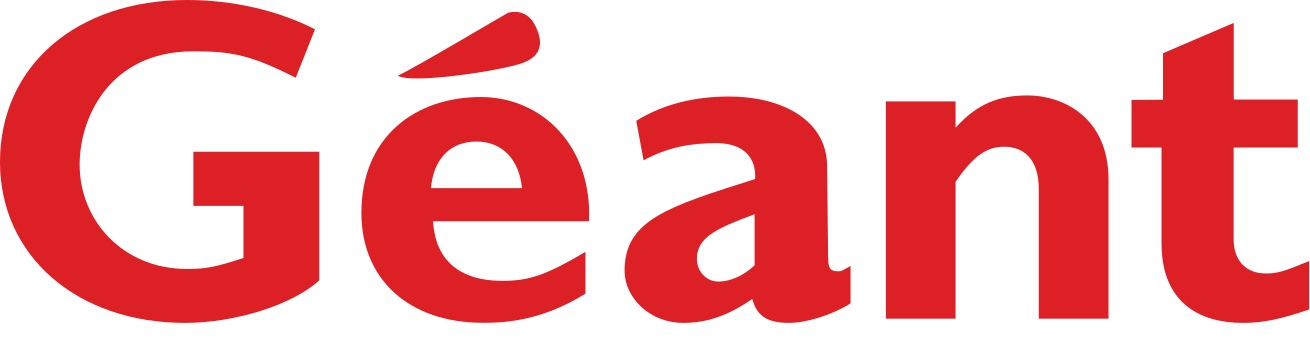
2023

== See also ==
- List of hypermarkets
