= Sherpa (brand) =

French retail cooperative

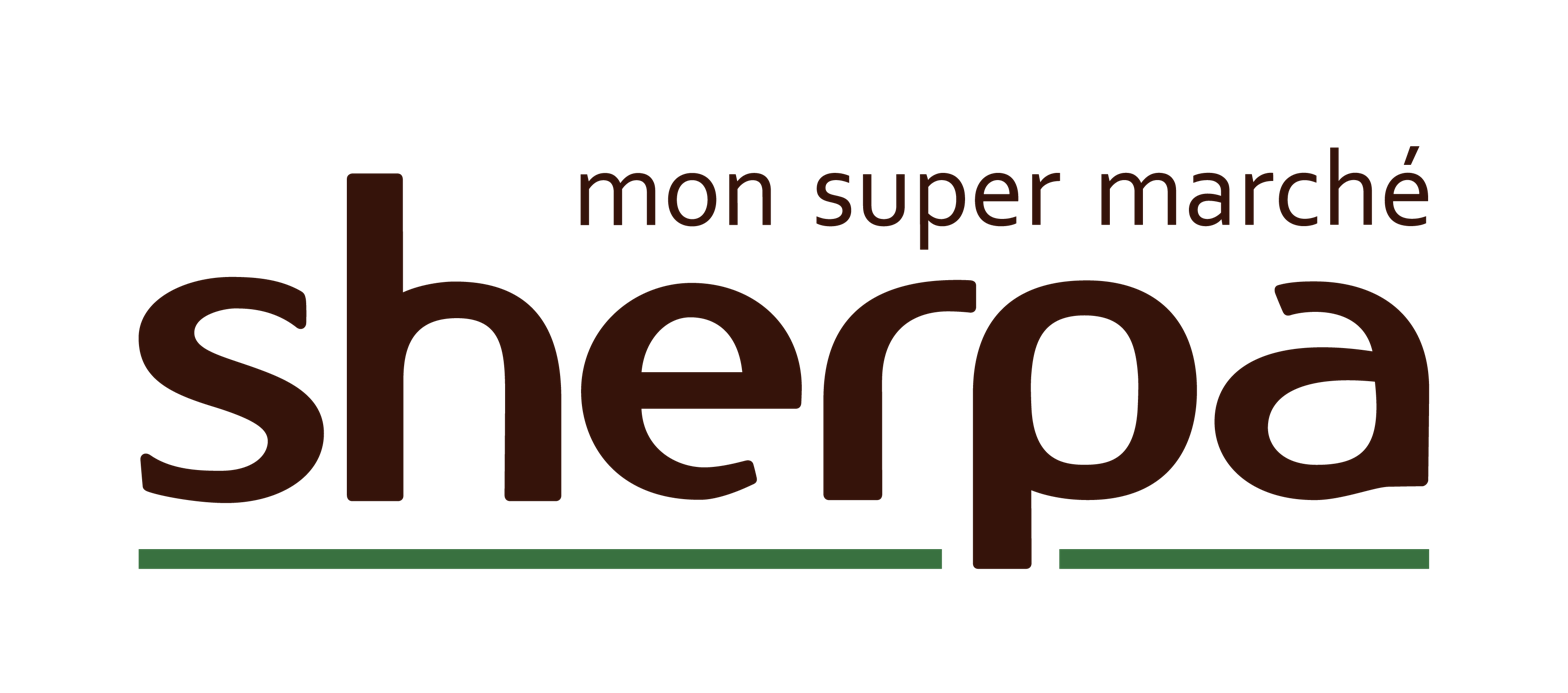
- Company type: SA Cooperative
- Founded: 1988
- Headquarters: Drumettaz-Clarafond, France
- Key people: Olivier Carrié (President)
- Revenue: €120 million (2023)
- Number of employees: 850 (including 650 seasonal workers)
- Parent: Société Coréma
- Website: www.sherpa.net

Sherpa is a cooperative of retailers and a brand in the food distribution sector in France, owned by the Coréma company, a subsidiary of the cooperative. It operates through a network of convenience stores and supermarkets, primarily located in French winter sports resorts across the Alps, the Jura Mountains, and the Pyrenees. The Casino Group has partnered with the cooperative to supply products to Sherpa supermarkets.

The name is both a reference to the Sherpa people living in high altitude, and verlan for cheap in french ("pas cher").

== History ==
In 1988, ten mountain commerce stakeholders joined forces to enhance their competitiveness by offering tailored services aimed at ensuring the success of their customers' vacations. Together, they established the Sherpa food retail brand.

From 1992 to 1999, operating independently of wholesale systems, Sherpa formed a partnership with the Promodès group. By 1995, Sherpa had grown to include 50 independent stores.

Between 1999 and 2009, Sherpa Alimentation entered into a commercial agreement with Carrefour's Prodim proximity division. The Carrefour Group held a 26% stake in Coréma until the end of 2009.

In 2002, Sherpa's legal structure evolved with the creation of SA Coopérative Sherpa, a retailers' cooperative with variable capital.

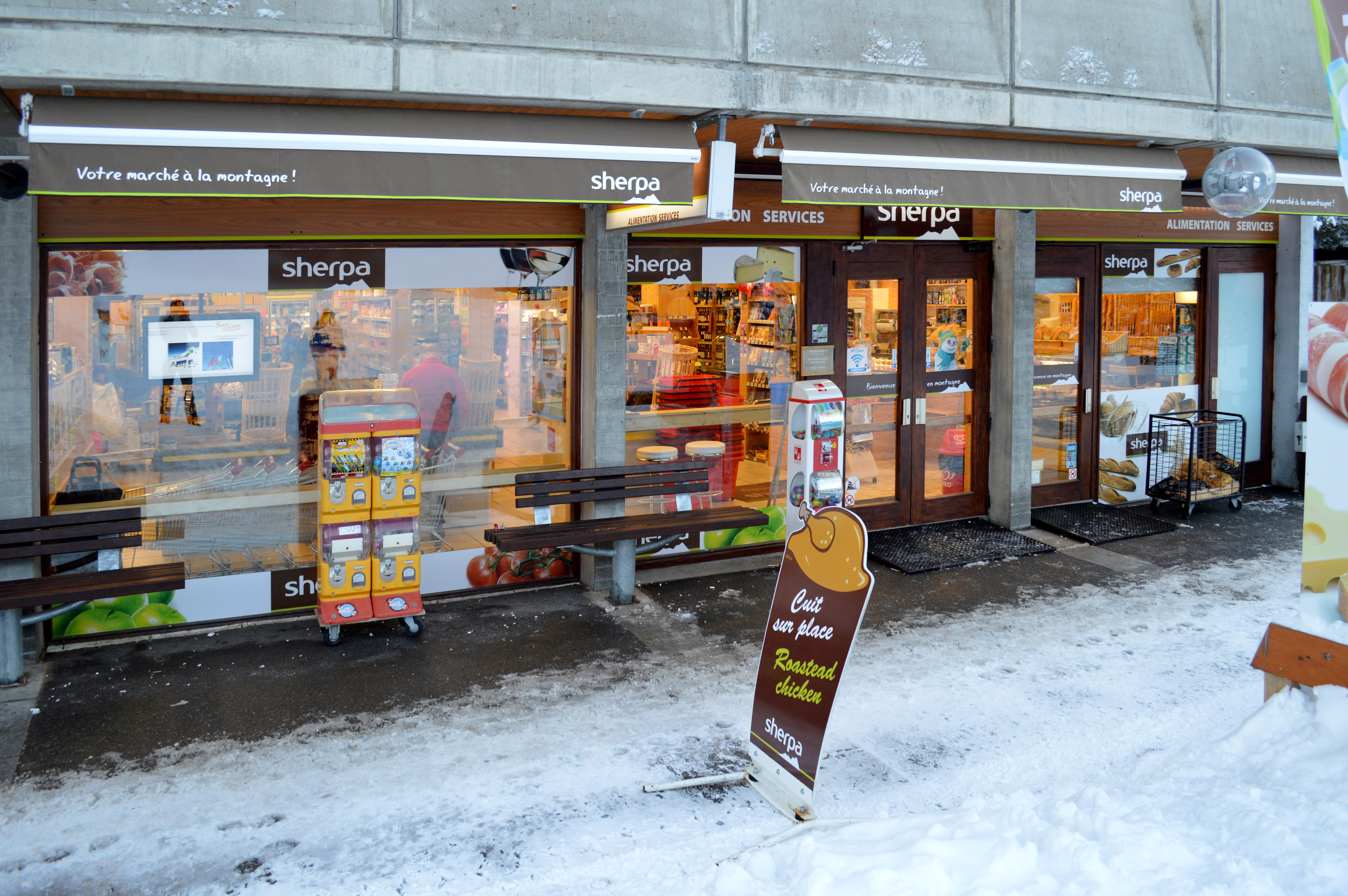
A Sherpa supermarket in Flaine, Haute-Savoie.

In 2007, the Sherpa Cooperative launched its own line of regional products under the "Terre de l'Alpe" brand.

At the end of 2009, the Casino Group signed a supply contract with Sherpa.

== Operations ==
Sherpa is a cooperative comprising a headquarters in Drumettaz, Savoie, near Lake Bourget, and approximately 100 independent stores. These stores are located in the Jura, Northern and Southern Alps, and the Pyrenees. Sherpa combines elements of an associative structure with a corporate framework.

The cooperative operates on a "one member, one vote" principle, rather than one vote per store. Since 2018, Olivier Carrié, manager of Sherpa stores in Les Menuires and Val Thorens, has served as the president of the Sherpa network.
