= Cdiscount =

French e-commerce website

- Company type: Limited company
- Website type: E-commerce
- Founded: December 4, 1998; 27 years ago
- Headquarters: Bordeaux, France
- Owner: Cnova
- Founders: Hervé, Christophe and Nicolas Charle
- Key people: Thomas Métivier (CEO)
- Industry: Internet, online retailing
- Products: Cultural, high-tech, information technology, housewares, apparel and accessories, personal care and beauty, food, children, services
- Revenue: €4,2 billion (2020)
- Employees: 2,000 (2020)
- Website: cdiscount.com

Cdiscount is a French e-commerce platform, ranking as the third largest in the country. The platform offers a wide range of products, including electronics, household appliances, and food.

In 2013, Cdiscount had the highest turnover with a growth rate that exceeded the market's average for that year.

Cdiscount's operations extend across six countries, including France, Belgium, Germany, Spain, Italy, and Luxembourg.

== History ==
Founded in December 1998 by three brothers, Hervé, Christophe and Nicolas Charle, Cdiscount has been a subsidiary of Casino Group since February 2000. In September 2008 Casino Group increased both its direct and indirect participation to 79,6% of the capital and adopted a new structure with a board constituted of Casino founders and representatives.

In January 2011, Casino Group bought the Charle brothers' shares and now possess 99.6% of the capital.

In March 2014, Emmanuel Grenier was appointed CEO of Cdiscount. In October 2014, Cdiscount continues its internationalization with the opening of cdiscount.com.br in Brazil, with the support of Cnova Brasil.

On 23 May 2019, Rallye S.A., owner of Groupe Casino, declared bankruptcy protection in an effort to maintain its high debt costs. Casino later announced that same day that the bankruptcy would not affect any of their subsidiaries and that operations would continue normally.

In 2023, Cdiscount's parent Casino announced that they have completed a deal to avoid bankruptcy. This restructuring procedure would allow for the company to cut high debt and improve recent losses to other rival supermarket corporations. In 2024, Casino USA filed for Chapter 15 bankruptcy.

== Operations ==
Cdiscount.com is an online retailer for goods and services. Its range is structured around 40 stores organized in categories: cultural goods, high-tech, IT, household appliances, and personal appliances. Cdiscount has also incorporated goods and services including financing, insurance, travel, wine, and mobile phone subscriptions.

In 2006 Cdiscount opened a pilot physical store in Le Bouscat near Bordeaux (France) that utilises sales data from the websites to select only the best-selling products. This store also acted as a delivery point for small packages.

A second store opened up in 2011 in Paris's 7th district, Rue du Bac. This store displays the bestsellers from the website in every category, totalling over 2000 products across high-tech, IT, appliances, toys, DVDs, video games, and wines and spirits.
