= Musée Baud =

Museum in canton Vaud, Switzerland

Coordinates: 46°49′13″N 6°28′16″E

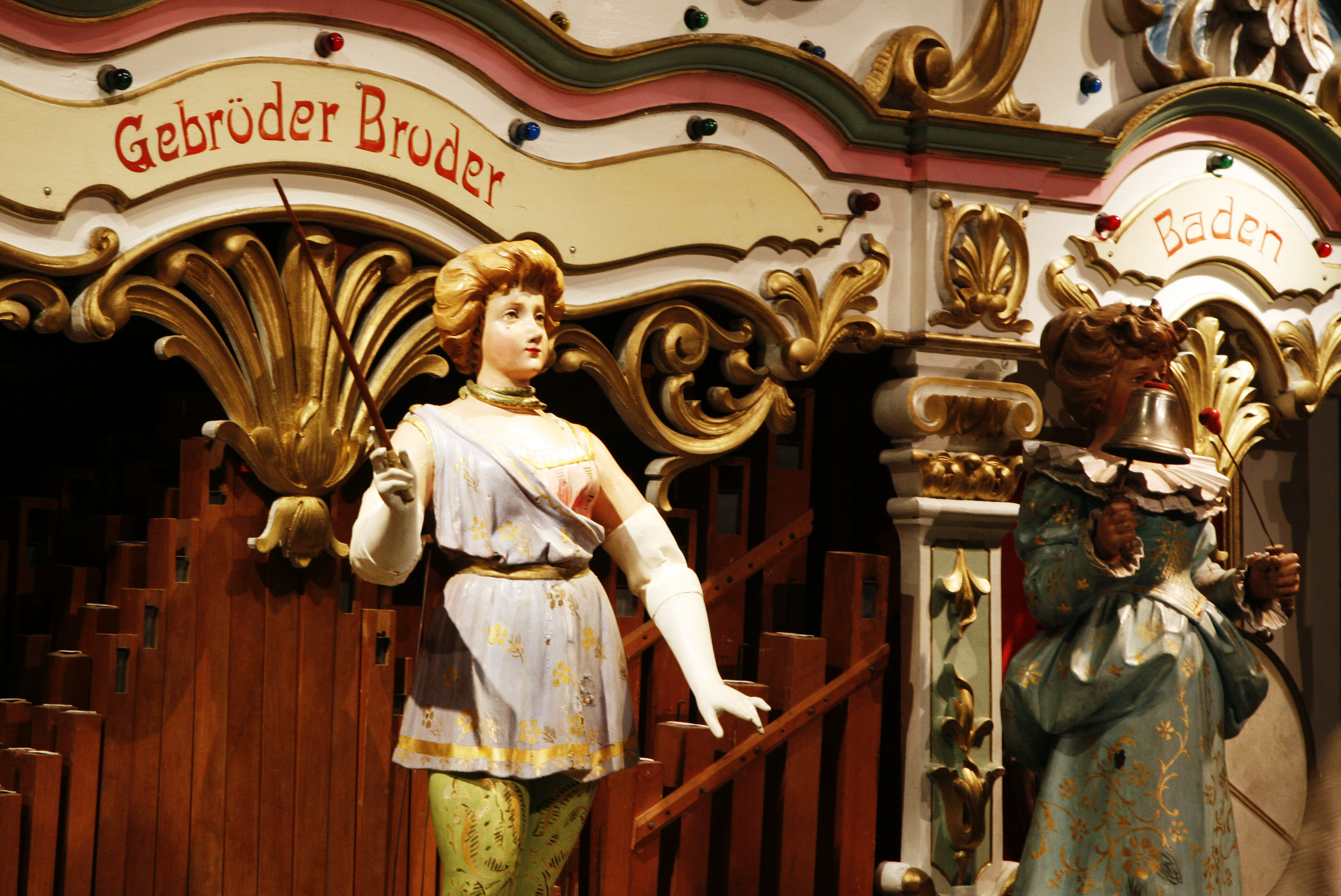

The Musée Baud is a music-box museum in the Swiss village of L'Auberson in the Jura Mountains in the canton of Vaud.

The museum houses one of the largest collections of music boxes, automatons, musical clocks, and gramophones. It includes unusual examples of singing birds and animated figures.

== History ==
The three Baud brothers were raised in a half-country, half-craft environment, Frédy born in 1915, Robert in 1917 and Auguste in 1924. They joined forces in 1946 and continued to run the small estate until 1956 and to restore the old music rooms.

On October 2, 1955, an old dream became reality with the opening of the museum. The current owners took over in 1995 and prevented the heritage from being dispersed around the world four decades later.

== See also ==
- List of music museums
