= Synagogue of Saint-Étienne =

Jewish Synagogue located in Saint-Etienne, Auvergne-Rhône-Alpes, France

- French: Synagogue de Saint-Étienne
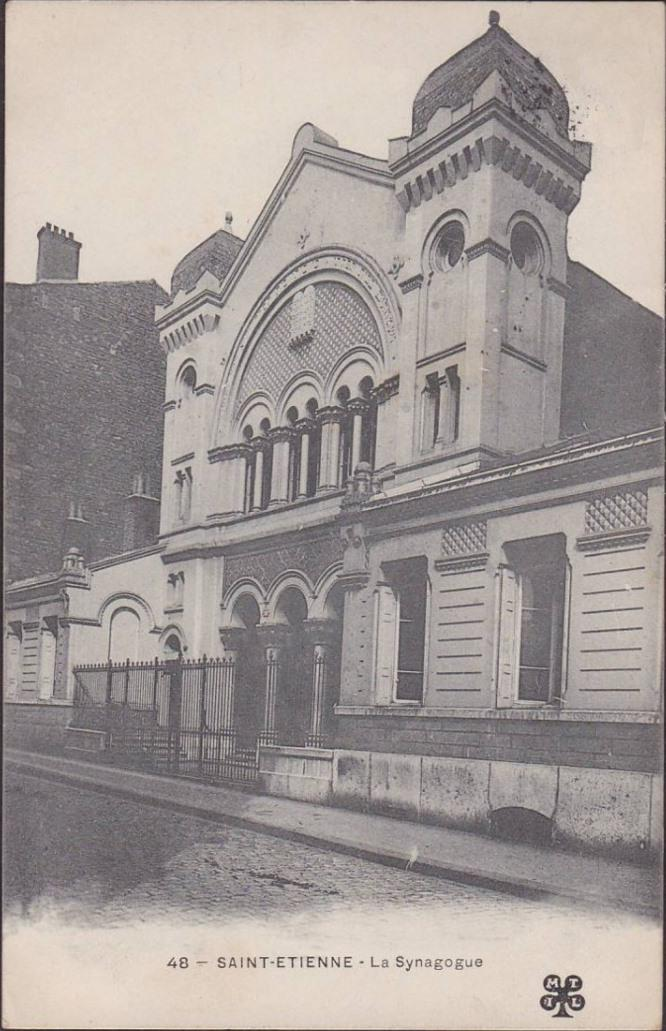

- Location of the synagogue in France Synagogue of Saint-Étienne (France)

Religion
- Affiliation: Judaism
- Ecclesiastical or organizational status: Synagogue
- Leadership: Rabbi Michel Elharrar
- Status: Active

Location
- Location: Saint-Etienne, Auvergne-Rhône-Alpes
- Country: France
- Interactive map of Synagogue of Saint-Étienne
- Coordinates: 45.44015°N 4.38173°E

Architecture
- Completed: 1880

The Synagogue of Saint-Étienne is a Jewish congregation and synagogue, located in Saint-Etienne, Auvergne-Rhône-Alpes, France.

== History ==
The Jewish community of the Loire and Haute-Loire was created in 1868 by Alsatian Jews, who were jointed by others after the Franco-Prussian War. At the beginning of the 20th century, Jews from Russia and Poland moved to Saint-Étienne.

The synagogue in Saint-Étienne was built in 1880.

=== World War II ===
Approximately twenty-five to one hundred Jewish families lived in Saint-Étienne at the beginning of the Second World War. They were joined by a number of refugee families from Alsace–Lorraine and Germany, for a total of around 500 people. A portion of this population (71 people) were arrested during a roundup on August 26, 1942, and brought to Lyon, then Drancy, before being deported to numerous extermination camps.

=== After the war ===
Following the Liberation of France, the Jewish community restarted their activities. André Stora was the Hazzan for the synagogue from 1951 to 1956, before becoming the Hazzan of the Grand Synagogue of Paris.

In the 1960s, the land under the synagogue started sinking. The building was destroyed and a community center was constructed in its place. Around the same time, North African Jews were integrated into the community. Today the synagogue is home to approximately sixty families. The Rabbi is Michel Elharrar.

== See also ==
- History of the Jews in France
- List of synagogues in France
