= Carulla (surname) =

Carulla is a surname. Notable people with the surname include:

- Domingo Carulla (1903–1939), Spanish footballer
- Juan Carulla (1888–1968), Argentine physician and politician
- Mario Carulla (born 1971), Peruvian badminton player
- Montserrat Carulla (1930–2020), Spanish actress
- Ramón Alberto Carulla Trujillo (born 1936), Cuban artist
