= Almacenes Éxito =

Colombian supermarket chain

- Company type: Subsidiary
- Industry: Hypermarket; Supermarket; Retail
- Founded: March 26, 1949; 77 years ago Medellín, Colombia
- Founder: Gustavo Toro Quintero
- Headquarters: Envigado, Colombia
- Key people: Gonzalo Restrepo Lopez, CFO; Carlos Mario Giraldo Moreno, pres retail operations
- Parent: Grupo Exito
- Website: www.exito.com

Éxito is a Colombian supermarket chain owned by Grupo Éxito and headquartered in Medellín, Colombia. It was founded in Envigado in the year 1949, by Gustavo Toro Quintero and now is one of the largest supermarket companies in the country, and has 390 stores located in 175 municipalities of Colombia. The capital city of Bogotá has the most stores.

== History ==
In March 26, 1949, Gustavo Toro Quintero (a businessman) opened the first store of "Almacenes Éxito" in the center of the Medellín. In its principles was a store dedicated to the selling of snippets and textile clothing.

Gustavo Toro loves helping those in need and that help was reinforced in 1993 with the creation of "Fundación Éxito" that in its beginnings was dedicated to strengthening topics like education, social conditions, and civic and cultural. Today its work focus is children´s nutrition.

In 1994 the company started its share opening entrancing to the Bogota, Medellín and West stock exchanges.

In 1998 it created the virtual store of Éxito in association with NormaNet being a pioneer in Colombian online trading.

In 2001, the company merged with "Cadenalco" disappearing in this way "Almacenes Super Ley" and then acquires to "Almacenes Ley".

In 2005 "Grupo Éxito" forays into the property business and creates the "Tarjeta Éxito" in an alliance with Tuya.

By 2010, Groupe Casino owned 67% of Almacenes Exito. The company starts the absorption of "Almacenes Ley" process to was completed in 2012.

In 2013 it created "Móvil Éxito" its telephone service supported by the infrastructure of "Tigo Colombia".

In 2018 it created the modern-futurist hypermarket "Éxito WOW!"

In 2022 "Almacenes Éxito" took over the stores of "Almacenes La 14" in Palmira, Cartago, Jamundí, Buenaventura, in the department of Valle del Cauca and the store of Girardot in the department of Cundinamarca.
