= Lucien Bechmann =

French architect

Lucien Adolphe Bechmann (25 July 1880 – 29 October 1968) is a French architect known for the Fondation Émile et Louise Deutsch de la Meurthe in the Cité internationale universitaire de Paris, the building Washington Plaza, Rue Washington in Paris and the Synagogue Chasseloup-Laubat in Paris.

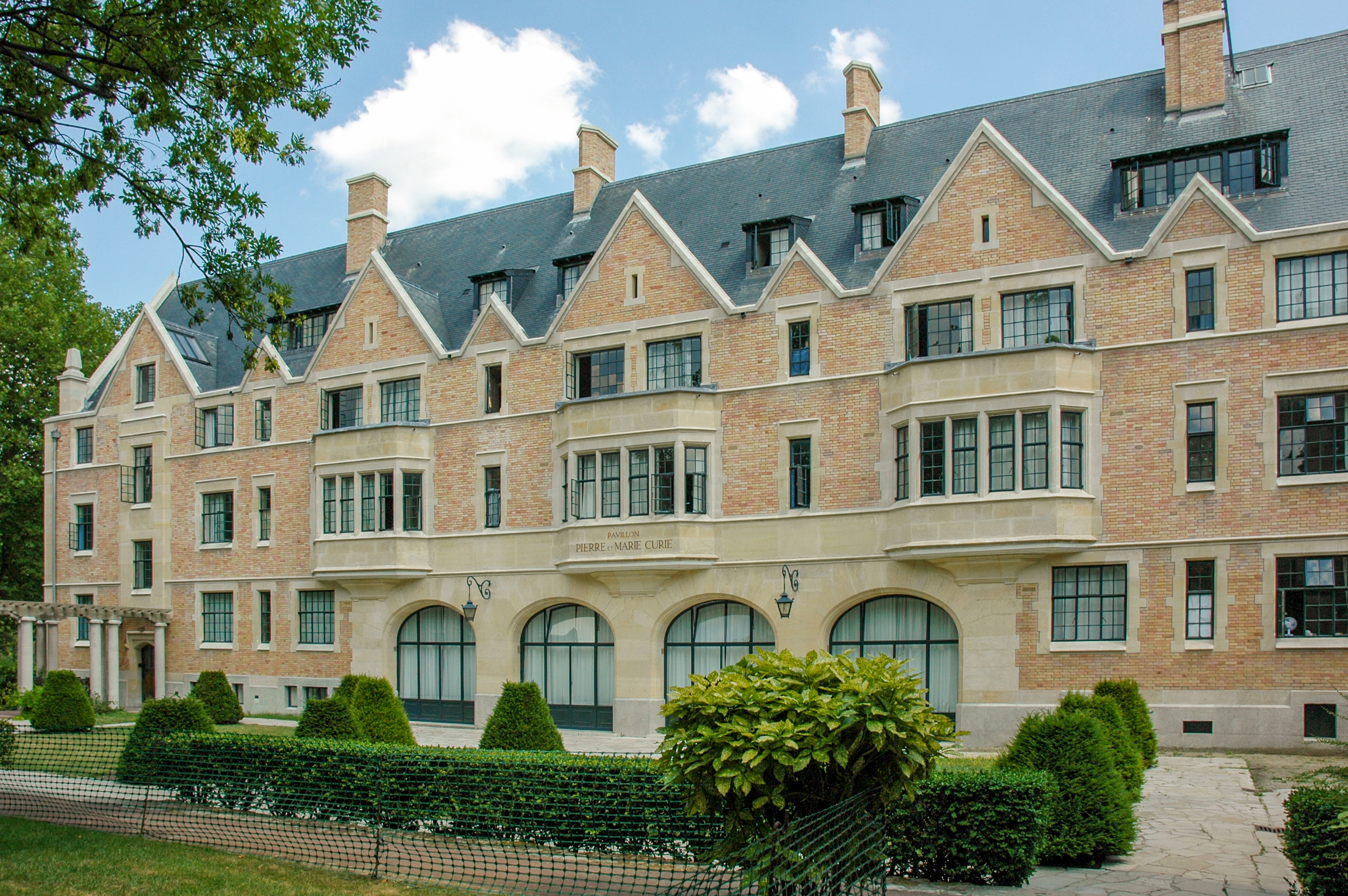
1922-1925 Fondation Émile et Louise Deutsch de la Meurthe
