= Grupo Éxito =

South American retail company

Almacenes Éxito SA
- Trade name: Grupo Éxito
- Type: Public
- Traded as: BVC: EXITO
- Industry: Retail
- Founded: 1949; 77 years ago
- Headquarters: Envigado, Colombia
- Number of locations: 2,606 (2015)
- Areas served: Colombia; Uruguay; Argentina
- Key people: Carlos Calleja
- Products: Clothing, food, electronics, real estate services, travel, insurance. Hypermarket, Supermarket
- Revenue: ▲US$33.4 billion (2015)
- Net income: ▲US$573.4 million (2015)
- Owner: Grupo Calleja (86.84%)
- Number of employees: 40,000 (2020)
- Divisions: Almacenes Éxito; Carulla Vivero; Pomona; Disco
- Website: grupoexito.com.co

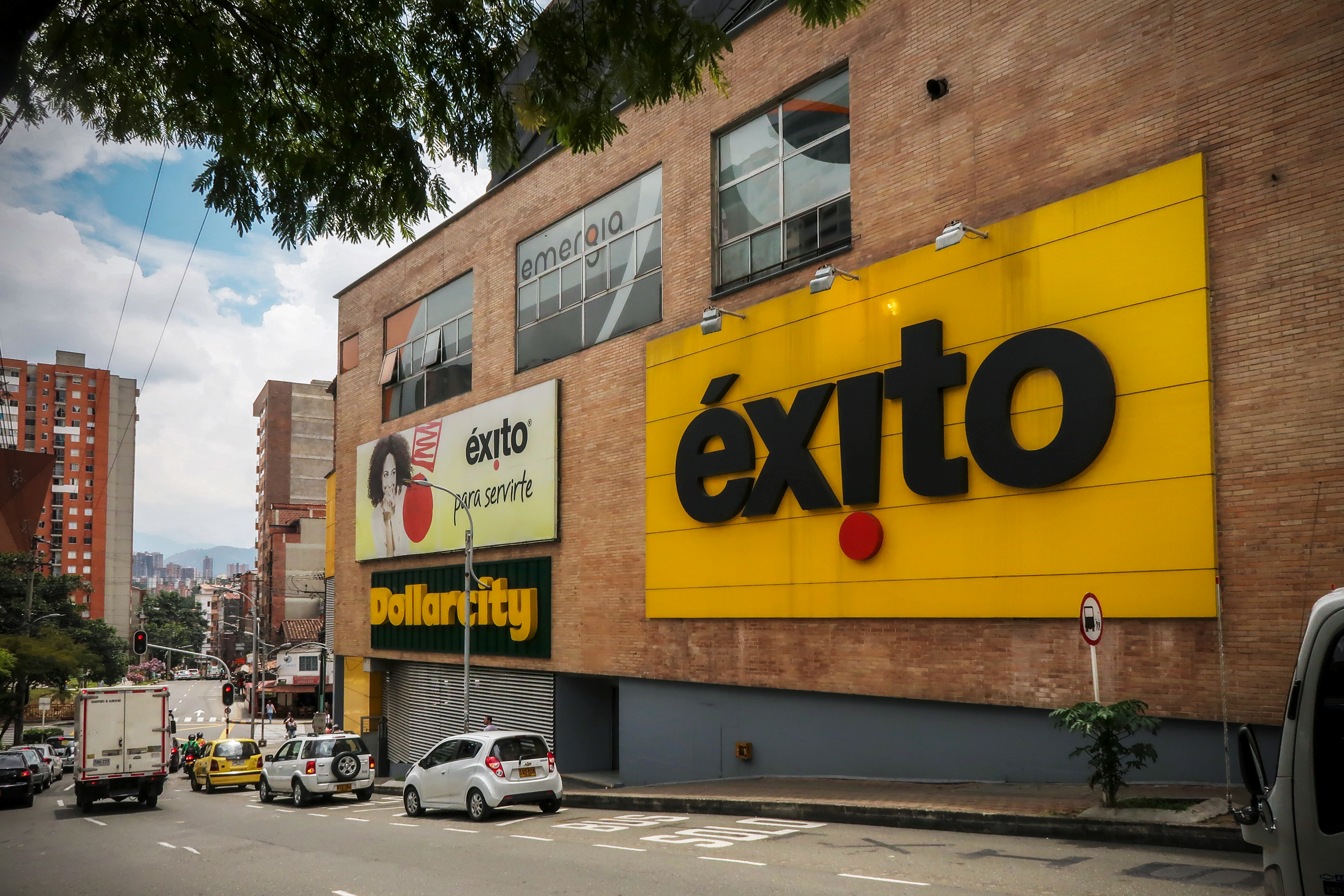
Éxito supermarket in Sabaneta, Colombia.

Grupo Éxito is a South American retail company. It operates 2,606 stores in South America. The stores sell a wide range of food and non food products. Though originally a textiles maker and seller (under such brand names as Arkitect, People, Bronzini, Pop Rose) recent acquisitions (mostly within the last 10–20 years) have further diversified the business making it a major grocer (under brand names like surtimax and carulla sales of food products make up about 70-75% of revenue). At its hypermarkets (the largest of which is the Éxito chain) it sells both packaged foods and perishables in addition to department store type products ranging from electronics to furniture.

Éxito is Colombia's largest supermarket chain.

== History ==
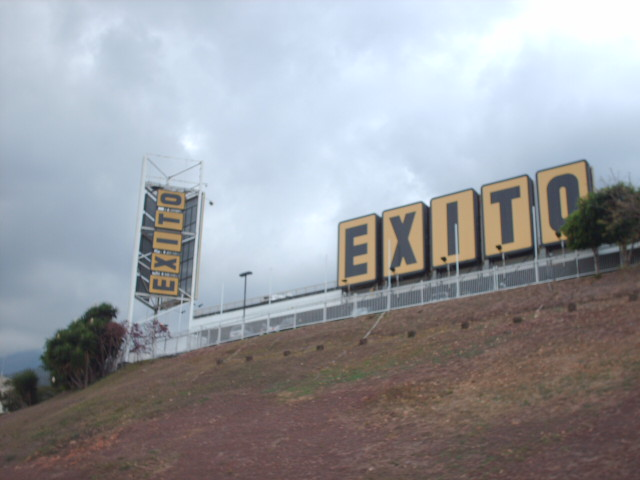
A former Exito store in Venezuela, before it was expropriated by the Venezuelan government, and then renamed to Bicentenario

Grupo Éxito traces its origins to a Medellín, Colombia family-run textile business, founded in 1949 by Gustavo Toro Quintero. Éxito is the Spanish word for "success". In 1972, it transitioned to a hypermarket-style experience when it added supermarket products and, in 1974, began adding more locations. Six years later, a flagship store opened in Bogotá, Colombia. In 1994, at which point there were four major locations, the company went public on the Medellín and Bogotá stock exchanges; however, it did not become a leading retailer until 1998, after the company had further expanded its offerings into areas such as eye care, travel, and pharmacy services.

The beginning of the 21st century was marked by an acquisitions spree, starting with an 80% interest in Venezuelan hypermarket operator Cativen, with much of the funds raised in the late 1990s after selling 25% of the company to French group Casino (and attracted additional investment from JP Morgan). By year end 2010 Groupe Casino owned 53.89% of Almacenes Éxito (down from 67% in September).

-Merged with Cadenalco (formerly Colombia's largest retailer) in 2001.

-Became associated with textiles and apparel company Didetexco in 2009 (ownership at 97.75%)

In 2012, Éxito bought some stores of El Ahorro in Manizales (including Aranzazu) into Éxito ans Surtimax

In 2018 Éxito creates a new format of a modern-futurist hypermarket who called Éxito WOW!

In 2022 Éxito replaces the headquarters of Almacenes La 14 in Palmira, Cartago, Tuluá, Buenaventura and Jamundí, Valle del Cauca Department, as well as the headquarters of Girardot, in Cundinamarca Department.

On January 26, 2024, Casino and GPA sold their 34% stake in Exito to the Salvadoran group Grupo Calleja for 400 million euros.

=== Acquisitions spree in Uruguay and Argentina ===
In the summer of 2011, Almacenes Éxito acquired the Devoto and Disco chains in Uruguay, for US $746 million, as part of its expansion plan in Latin America. In July 2015, it completed the takeover of 100% of the Argentine chain Hipermercados Libertad and 50% of the Brazilian group Pão de Açúcar.

=== Envigado shopping center ===
On October 5, 2018, Grupo Éxito opened the Viva Envigado shopping center, which with 260,000 m² is the second largest shopping center in Colombia after Centro Mayor (Bogotá), Calima (Bogotá), Mayorca Mega Plaza (Sabaneta), Plaza Central (Bogotá) and Santafé (Bogotá)

=== Venezuela ===
Cativen (acronym for Cadena de Tiendas Venezolanas SA) is a Venezuelan supermarket chain founded on March 23, 1995. It became affiliated with Grupo Exito in 2004 when Groupe Casino acquired 80% of Cativen's shares. At the time Almacenes Exito was also operating a number of its own stores in the country. In early 2010, the Government of Venezuela expropriated several Éxito supermarkets citing price gauging, hoarding of supplies, and breaching the Law for the Defence of Persons in Access to Goods and Services. Subsequently, it bought the shares of the French group Casino, which owned 61.7% of Cativen's shares, and nationalized the remaining six Éxito supermarkets in the country. The Venezuelan government changed the name of the acquired Cativan supermarkets to Bicentennial Supplies.

== Logo ==
Old logo from 1989 to 2010

From 1989 to 2010, The Éxito logo included: 5 yellow rectangles with the letters "E" "X" "I" "T" and "O" in caps serif font with black outline.

In 2010, was changed a new logo with lowercase font with the i tilted to shape the exclamation mark with a red dot.

== Subsidiaries/Divisions ==
- Éxito (262 locations) - Operates hypermarkets throughout Colombia.
- Carulla - (Controlled by Almacenes since 2007, there are 100 supermarket stores) Markets products under the brand names Vivero, Carulla. Vivero has more of a department store format.
- Viva - Shopping Malls
- Pomona - Supermarket operator
- Surtimax (153 locations in Colombia), cash & carry discount stores
- Super Inter
- Surtimayorista
- Uruguay
  - Devoto
  - Disco
  - Geant
- Argentina
  - Libertad
  - Paseo Libertad - large hypermarkets

== Ownership structure ==
Just over 56% of company shares are held by Grupo Calleja. The rest are with The Antioqueño Business Group & pension funds (19%), 4% by ADRs, roughly 20% belongs to institutional investors and banks.
