= Rahamim Naouri =

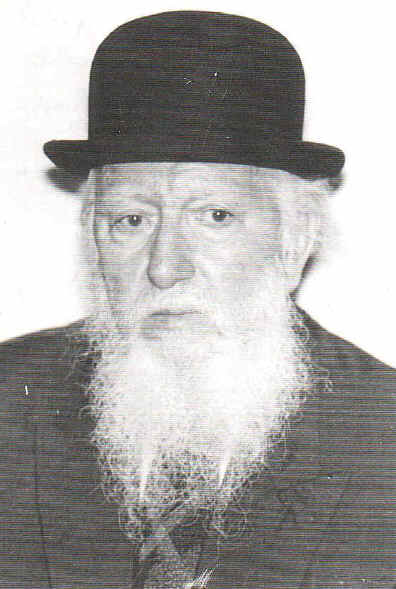
- Born: 1902
- Died: 1985
- Occupation: Rabbi

Rahamim Naouri (1902-1985) was an Algerian rabbi. He served as the chief rabbi of Bône, French Algeria, and later the head of a rabbinical court in Paris, France.

== Early life ==
Rahamim Naouri was born in 1902.

== Career ==
Naouri served as the chief rabbi of Bône.

Naouri was a religious Zionist, and he was an advocate of the creation of the State of Israel in 1948. He also supported Bnei Akiva.

At the outset of the Algerian War, Naouri vowed to stay in Bône as long as there was still a minyan. In 1962, some suggested Naouri should join a temporary unity government in Rocher Noir in the manner of the Moroccan government; however, Naouri never did, possibly due to opposition from the FNL.

Naouri subsequently served as the head of a rabbinical court in Paris.

== Death ==
Naouri died in 1985
