= Groupe Casino =

French retail company

Casino Guichard-Perrachon S.A.
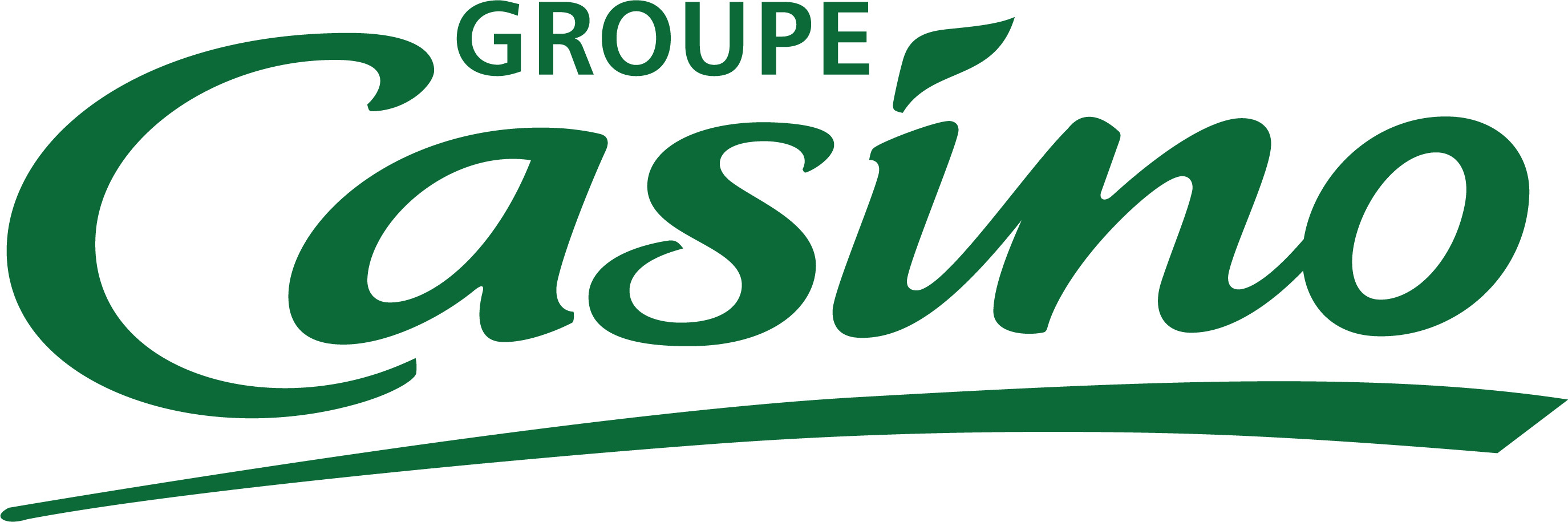
- Type: Public company
- Traded as: Euronext Paris: CO; CAC Small
- ISIN: FR001400OKR3
- Industry: Mass retail
- Founded: 1898; 128 years ago
- Founder: Geoffroy Guichard
- Headquarters: Saint-Étienne, France
- Key people: Jean-Charles Naouri
- Revenue: ▼€31.05 billion (2021): ▼€14.41 billion (France); ▼€14.61 billion (Latam); ▼€2.03 billion (E-commerce)
- Operating income: ▼€-656 million (2021)
- Net income: ▼€-397 million (2021)
- Total assets: ▲€30.53 billion (2021)
- Total equity: ▼€5.64 billion (2021)
- Number of employees: ▼28,200 employees worldwide (2024)
- Subsidiaries: List: Géant Casino; Casino Supermarchés; Casino Supermarchés; Hyper Casino; Petit Casino; Casino Shop; Casino Restauration; Monoprix; Naturalia; Franprix; Leader Price; Vival; Cdiscount; Pão de Açúcar; Grupo Éxito; Libertad; Mini Libertad; Devoto; Disco; Jumbo
- Website: www.plesio.fr

Casino Group or Casino Guichard-Perrachon is a French mass-market retail group. It was founded on 2 August 1898 by Geoffroy Guichard under the corporate name Guichard-Perrachon & Co.

Casino Group is the source of many innovations, such as the first distributor's brand in 1901, the first self-service store in 1948, or even the display of a sell-by date on consumer products in 1959.

Casino Group operates across all food and non-food formats: supermarkets, convenience stores, discount stores, and wholesale stores. Casino Group owns brands such as Monoprix, Franprix, Cdiscount, Vival, and Casino. Internationally, through its franchise subsidiary ExtenC, it also operates the Géant and Leader Price brands.

As of 2017 Casino Group, managed by Jean-Charles Naouri, was quoted on the Paris Stock Exchange and had total revenue of €37.8 billion. As of November 2021, the group has a market capitalization of approximately €2.35 billion.

Between June 2023 and October 2024, in the grip of a financial crisis linked to its debt, the group closed or sold all of its Casino supermarkets and Géant hypermarkets in France to competitors. During this crisis, Casino and Géant brands are also gradually being replaced by competitors in various countries.

The group employs 28,200 people in April 2024.

In its results for the first half of 2024, the Casino group announced that the Leader Price franchise activities are part of the discontinued operations.

From 2024 a consortium led by Daniel Kretinsky will own and control 53.7% of Casino's share capital.

== History ==
=== Casino's genesis (1892–1898) ===
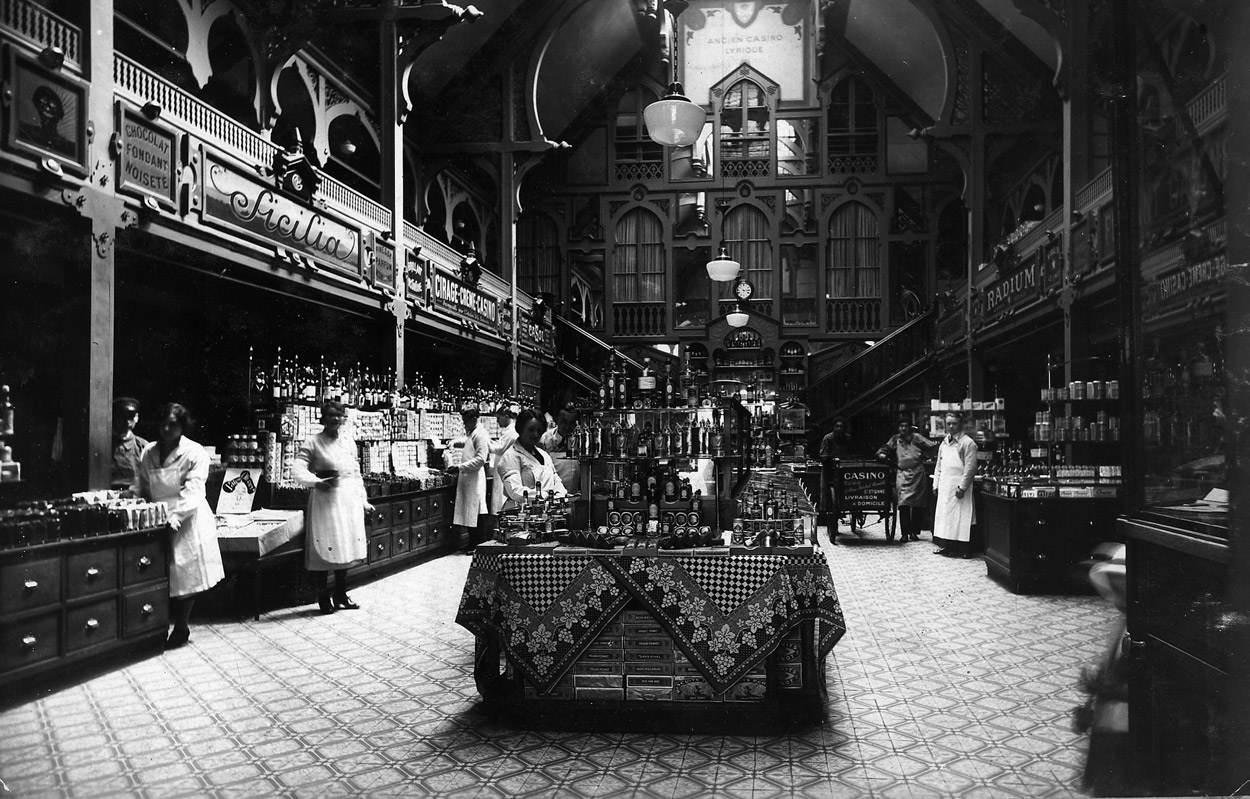
The first store in Saint-Etienne, 1898

Geoffroy Guichard was born on 27 July 1867 in Feurs, in the Auvergne-Rhône-Alpes region. His parents were the owners of a retail grocery business in Saint-Étienne. In 1889, he married Antonia Perrachon and became a partner with Paul Perrachon, his cousin-in-law, who had been the owner of a shop in the region for around ten years. Geoffroy Guichard became the sole business owner in 1892. The store, located rue des Jardins, was originally the Lyrical Casino of Saint-Étienne. Closed in the 1850s, the Lyrical Casino was transformed into a retail grocery store in the 1860s. Geoffroy Guichard grew the grocery store to turn it into a general food store, based on the Felix Potin model. In April 1898, due to the success of the concept, Geoffroy Guichard opened the first branch in Veauche, in Loire.

=== The beginnings of Casino (1898–1904) ===
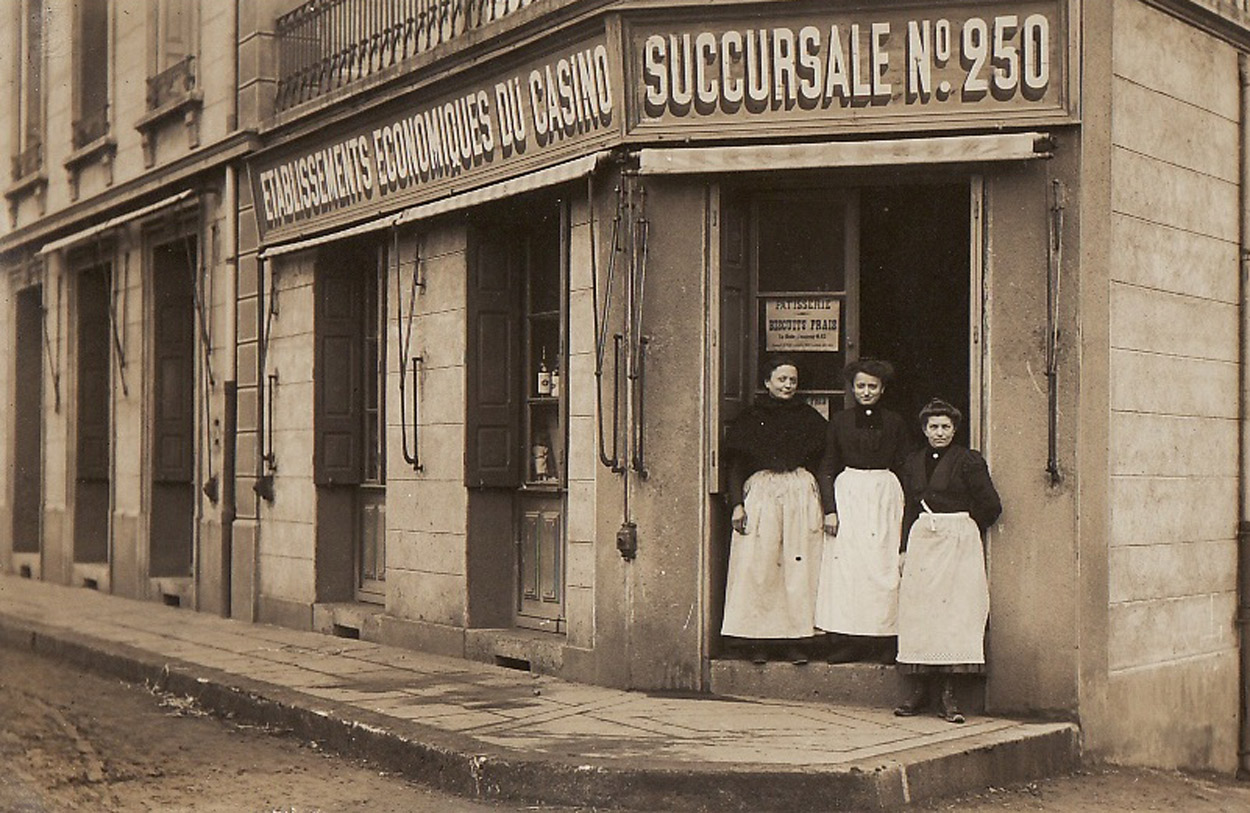
A Casino feed store, 1900

On 2 August 1898, Geoffroy Guichard founded with his father-in-law « la Société des Magasins du Casino » and « Établissements économiques d’alimentation under the corporate name Guichard-Perrachon & Co. In total, 77 people subscribed to the capital of the new company. The Guichard spouses owned 35% of the company's capital (limited by shares). As from 1898, warehouses and factories were built in Saint-Étienne. Damaged by a fire in 1900, they were rebuilt reaching a total surface of 16 000 m². In the factories, Casino baked bread, produced oil and chocolate, roasted coffee, distilled and produced homemade liquors. An important wine business was also developed. Nearly 40 branches were opened in 1899. In September 1904, the 100th branch was opened in Lamastre in Ardèche and in July 1905, the 21st concession.

=== The development of social action (1904–1923) ===
In the first quarter of the 20th century, the company developed a social action plan dedicated to its employees, with, in 1904, the launch of an insurance fund, the creation of a health service in 1905, benefits for large families and a birth premium in 1910 or even child benefits and profit sharing for all employees as from 1916. In 1912, Casino created the Sports branch Casino employees’ Social Club, a sports organization in accordance with its sports corporatism policy. The Social club opened its football section in July 1919 alongside other disciplines such as athletics or basketball. More commonly referred to as AS Casino, the Social club became "l’Association Sportive Stéphanoise" in 1927 then "l’Association Sportive de Saint-Étienne" in 1933. In 1923, in celebration of its 25th anniversary, Casino put in place a pension fund which ensured the security of employees leaving the company. The Casino share was quoted on the Stock Exchange as from 1910.

=== Industrial development after WWI (1920–1940) ===
As from 1920, Casino continued to grow by creating factories and warehouses. In 1929, the company counted nearly 1000 branches and over 500 outlets. At that time, Casino was present across 28 districts. In 1923, Geoffroy Guichard became administrator of « L’Épargne de Toulouse », which had similar operations to Casino's with around 300 branches located in the South-West of France. Geoffroy Guichard took permanent control of the company in 1925. Geoffroy Guichard announced the transfer of the company to his children during the general meeting of October 1929. At that time, Casino counted around 2000 employees. After the death of Geoffroy Guichard in May 1940, Mario Guichard became President of the executive board. He was surrounded by his brothers Jean, Georges, Paul et Pierre Guichard, and his brother-in-law François Kemlin.

In June 1941, François Kemlin created a network of clandestine activities. It benefited from important material resources made available by the company. These actions ranged from making packages/parcels and sending letters to creating files to enable the escape of War prisoners. Bombings during the War damaged many factories, warehouses and offices. Some even had to close down.

=== The Great innovations (1940–1950) ===
In 1947, Pierre Guichard took a trip to North America to observe growing trends. He discovered the self-service store concept. A year later, Casino opened its first self-service store in Saint-Étienne. Over a period of 10 years, 500 branches adopted this new sales principle. In 1950, one of the first cooling systems was put in place in distribution. There again, it was a type of innovation observed in the US. Gradually, warehouses were equipped with cooling chambers and refrigerated coolers. In 1959, Casino was the first distributor to display a sell-by date on its products. This was made compulsory in December 1984 with the use-by date. Already in 1928, the Group had put in place "calendar displays" on product packaging, as a quality guarantee.

=== The development of new formats (1950–1990) ===
In 1957, Casino opened its first supermarket in Nice, under the brand Nica. The store, which was totally self-service, offered both food and non-food products. The first supermarket with the Casino name opened in May 1960 in Grenoble. A few months later, four new stores opened in Nice, Saint-Étienne, Firminy and Lyon. The first two Paris supermarkets opened in 1970 in Saint-Denis and Bagneux. In March 1970, the first Géant Casino hypermarket opened its doors in Marseille. It was then the biggest store in France with a surface of 16000 m^{2}. The shopping mall was made of 41 independent businesses and a Casino cafeteria. The SOMABRI company (SOciété des Magasins de BRIcolage/the company of DIY stores) was created in 1978 to enable Casino Group to be present on the DIY market. It opened its first two stores in 1978 in Toulouse Fenouillet and in Clermont le Brézet. Casino transferred its majority ownership to Castorama in October 1989.

=== The Internationalization of Casino Group (1976–1999) ===
In 1976, the internationalization of Casino Group started in the United States with the creation of Casino USA to operate French cafeterias in the USA. Restaurants were opened in Phoenix, Arizona, then in Beverly Hills, Santa Monica, Westwood Village, Costa Mesa, and Seattle in California. Many convenience businesses also opened their doors under the name Le Petit Casino.

The Group took over the chain Thriftimart, Inc. stores which then became Smart & Final Iris.

Back then, the company owned around 90 retail outlets, all self-service, and implanted mainly in California. The internationalization of Casino Group then accelerated until the end of the 1990s with its development across South America. In March 1996, Casino Group signed a partnership agreement with Dairy Farm International, one of the biggest groups of supermarkets in Asia. A joint company was then created for the development of hypermarkets in the Asian South-East and particularly in Taïwan where a first hypermarket opened in 1998. In 1999, Casino Group bought into the capital of Distribution Groups GPA and Grupo Éxito in Brazil and in Colombia.

=== The Merger between Casino Group and Rallye Group (1985–1991) ===
In April 1985, Casino Group purchased the Company Cedis of Besançon, which helped the Group develop in the East of France. In April 1990, Casino took over the Compagnie Française d’Afrique Occidentale, La Ruche Méridionale d’Agen and SODIM and strengthened its implantation in the South of France. In October 1992, Casino Group, then managed by Antoine Guichard (grandson of Geoffroy Guichard), merged with the Rallye Group owned by Jean-Charles Naouri. Rallye brought Casino all of its distribution and catering activities. The Group was then present all over the French territory. At the end of this operation, Rallye owned 29% of the total capital of Casino Group. Antoine Guichard, the last family manager of Casino Group, did not want to give up the presidency of the company. The Rallye company was founded in 1945 by Jean Cam. Threatened by serious cash flow problems, it was bought back in 1991 by Jean-Charles Naouri and his investment company, Euris.

=== Growth in France: affiliates and partnerships (1992–1997) ===
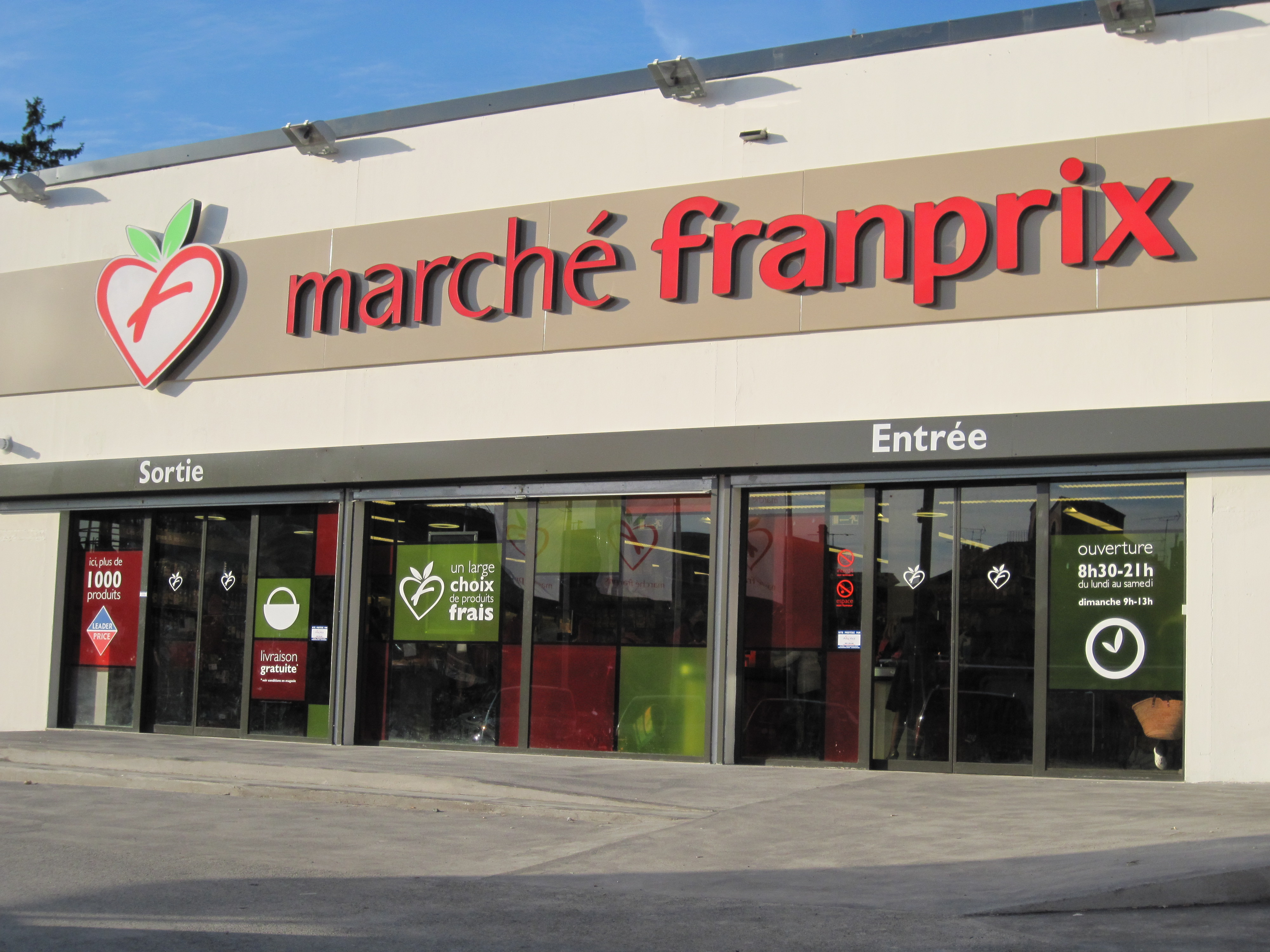
A Franprix front-of-store

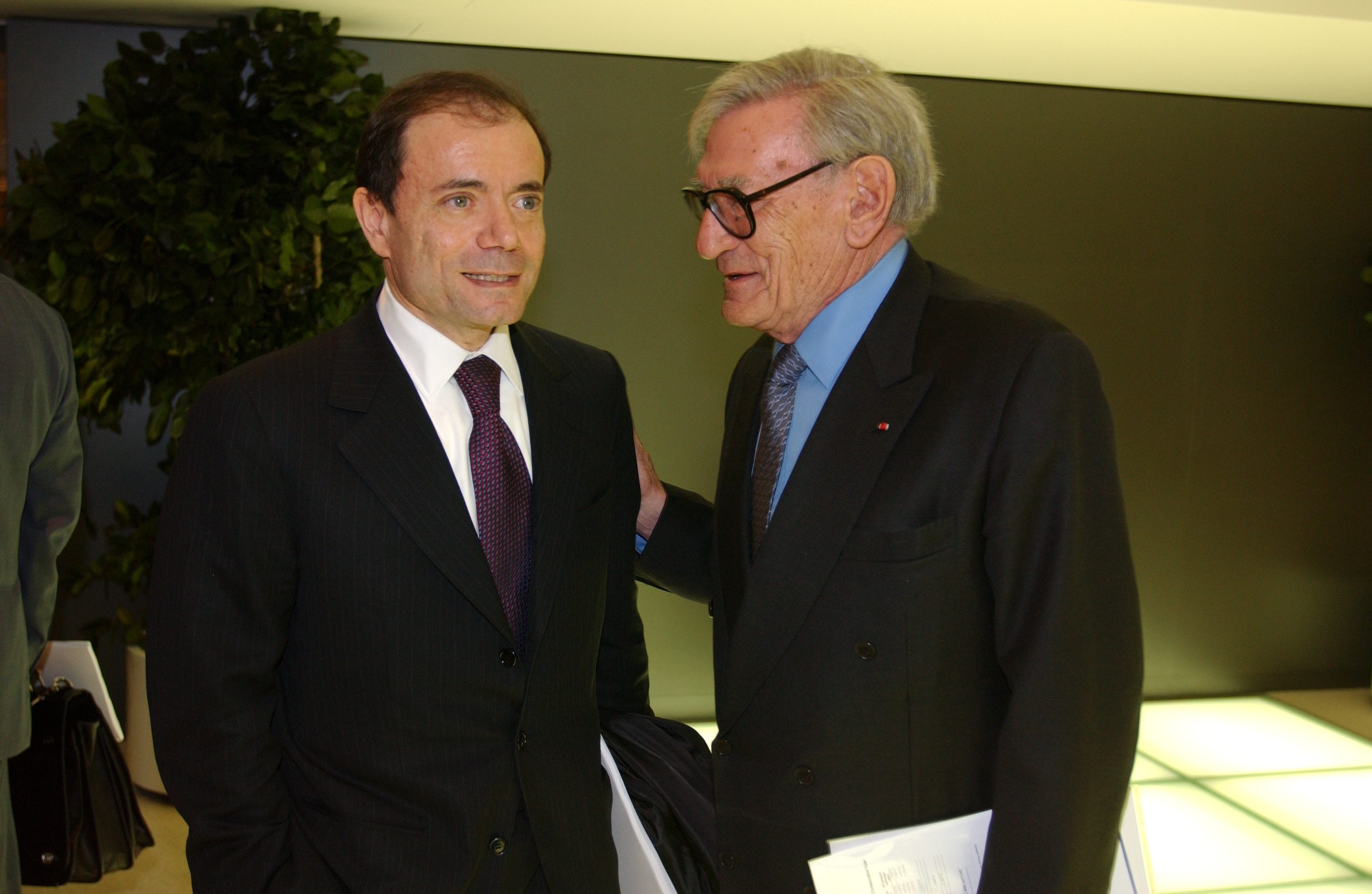
In 1992, Groupe Casino merged with Groupe Rallye, owned by Jean-Charles Naouri.

To increase its presence in France, Casino Group continued its wave of acquisitions by signing many agreements with national distributors. Corse Distribution Group became affiliated with Casino in 1992. Many hypermarkets and supermarkets then became Casino stores. Between 1995 and 1996, Casino took majority ownership in the different companies of Corse Distribution, enabling the development of many new franchise names. In December 1996, Casino Group and Monoprix, branch of Galeries Lafayette, signed a partnership agreement for purchasing and logistics. Less than a year later, Casino supported Monoprix financially in the total acquisition of Prisunic's capital and became therefore, shareholder at 21.6% of the capital of this new Group. In September 1997, Casino Group took majority ownership in the Franprix and Leader Price brands and their network of 650 stores.

=== Major changes in Casino Group's shareholding (1997–1998) ===
In 1997, after many months of stock-market battle, Jean-Charles Naouri, the Guichard family and employees of the Group rejected a hostile tender offer made by the Promodès distributor. Following a counter-bid, Jean-Charles Naouri became the majority shareholder of Casino Group in 1998.

=== Acceleration of the investment strategy (1999–2014) ===
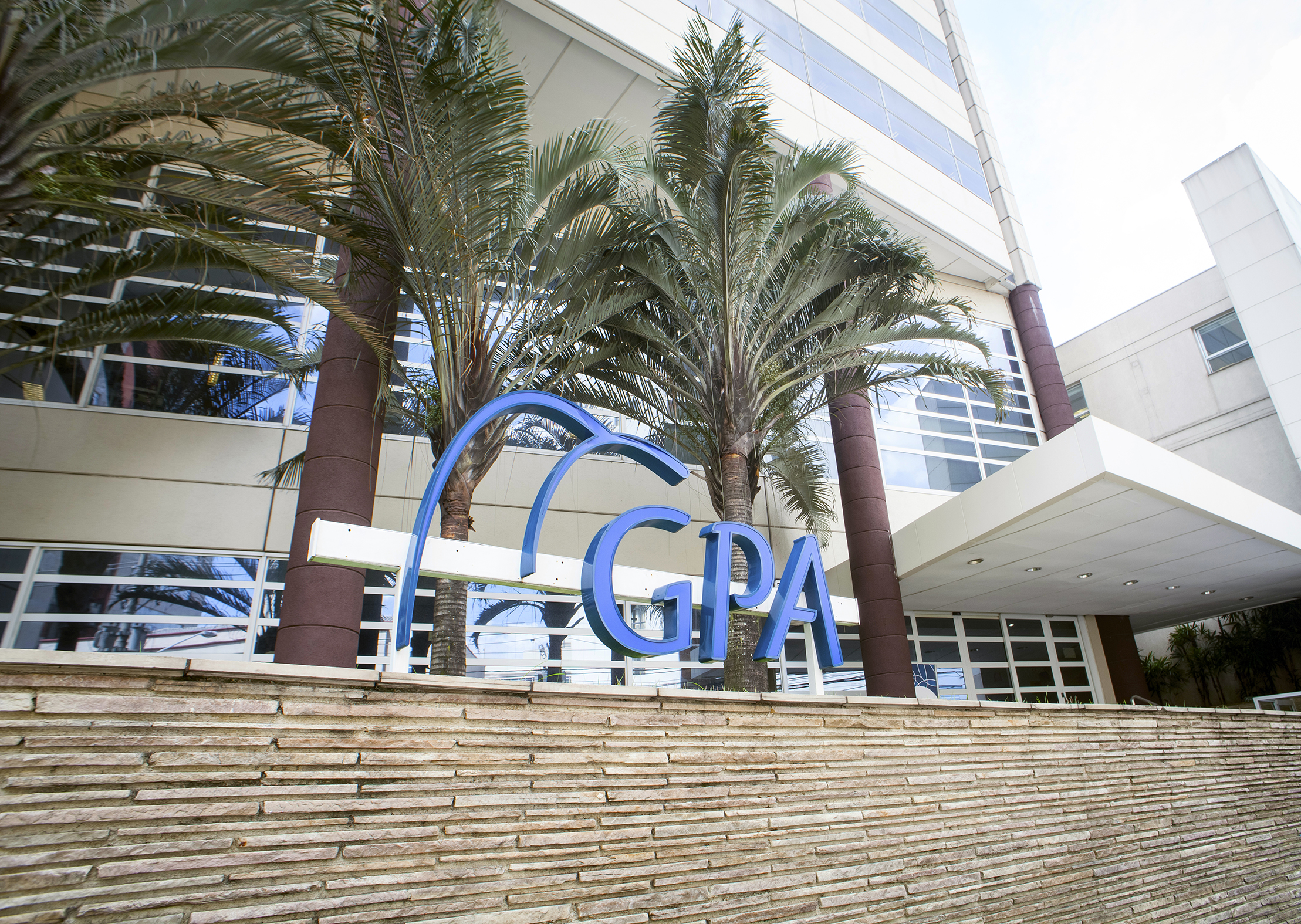
GPA Headquarter in Brasil

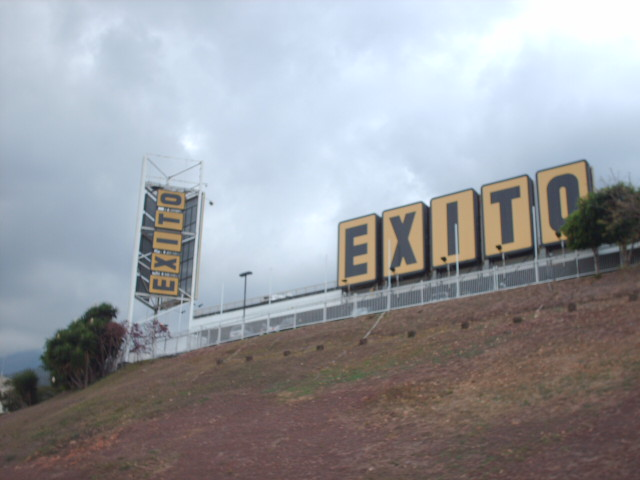
Exito store in Caracas

Under the aegis of Jean-Charles Naouri, Casino Group developed its assets in France and internationally. In March 1997, Casino Group signed an affiliate agreement with the Uruguayan Brand Disco for the construction of a Géant Casino in Montevideo. The store opened its doors in 1999. In February 1998, Casino Group took over the Argentine Group Libertad operating 7 hypermarkets across the country. Libertad was then the third company of hypermarkets in Argentine. In 1999, Casino subscribed to the capital of leading distribution companies in their respective countries, GPA in Brazil and Grupo Éxito in Colombia. After having strengthened its position in 2005, Casino Group became in July 2012 the sole controlling shareholder of GPA, no 1 in distribution and no 2 in e-business in Brazil. In 2000, Casino Group acquired Monoprix (50% of it), Franprix, Leader Price and Cdiscount. Activities grew again with the creation of Banque Casino in 2001 as well as property management company Mercialys, managing all the shopping malls owned by Casino. These assets represented 150 shopping malls on hypermarket and supermarket sites, as well as the premises of cafeterias owned by the Group.

In 2005, Jean-Charles Naouri was appointed CEO of Casino Group. Casino inaugurated its new Head Office in Saint-Étienne, its historical stronghold, in 2007. In the same year, the Group created GreenYellow, its energy-specialised branch and sells its shares in Smart & Final. Its first photovoltaic plant was connected to the electric network in 2010. In that year, Casino Group continued its growth in Asia by acquiring Thai participations in the Carrefour Group with its Big C branch. In 2011, the Charle brothers sold their shares in the Cdiscount capital. Casino then held 99.6% of shares. In the same year, Casino Group and La Poste signed a partnership agreement. With a length of 5 years, it aimed at creating convenience food businesses in available premises, next to Post offices, in villages of under 12,000 inhabitants. In July 2012, the Group acquired 50% of shares held by Galeries Lafayette Group in Monoprix. Jean-Charles Naouri was named CEO by the Board of Directors of the Brand. The Group purchased the majority of Le Mutant stores and renamed them "Leader Price". In parallel, the Group reduced its shares in Mercialys, by around 40.2%. On 8 October 2014, the Group and Intermarché announced an agreement as regards purchases for big brand products in France. This agreement meant that the 2 Groups were purchasing leaders in France with a market share of 25.8%.

=== Activity refocusing (since 2015) ===
In February 2016, the Group announced the sale of 59% of its shares in its Big C Thai activities for 3.1 billion Euros. In April, the company announced the sale of Big C Vietnam to Central Group for 1 Billion dollars. In December 2017, Casino Group signed an agreement with Ocado to develop a technological platform with an automated warehouse in France. Announced a business partnership aiming at selling Monoprix food products to Amazon Prime Now customers.

On 23 May 2019, Casino's parent company Rallye S.A., declared bankruptcy protection in an effort to maintain its high debt costs. Casino later announced that same day that the bankruptcy would not affected any of their subsidiaries and that operations would continue normally.

=== Debt crisis and change in shareholding (since 2021) ===
Over the whole of 2021, debt started to rise again, going from 3.9 billion euros to 5.9 billion. In three years, the share price has lost almost 50% of its value.

In 2023, Casino announced that they have completed a deal to avoid bankruptcy. This restructuring procedure would allow for the company to cut high debt and improve recent losses to other rival supermarket corporations.

At the beginning of January 2024, as part of the debt restructuring, the Casino group announced the sale of 288 stores, including 162 which will come under the Intermarché brand, 98 under the Auchan brand and 26 under the Carrefour brand.

On 26 January 2024, the group sold its 34% stake in Exito to the Salvadoran group Grupo Calleja for 400 million euros.

In 2024, Casino USA filed for Chapter 15 bankruptcy.

In January 2025, the Puig & fils group (92 Petit Casino or Vival supermarkets), then in April 2025 the Magne group (101 Petit Casino or Vival supermarkets), announced that it was leaving the Casino group for Carrefour.

In July 2026, the Casino Group announced that it had received 'firm proposals' from its creditors regarding its €1.4 billion debt (which matures in March 2027).

== Activities of the group ==
=== Brands ===
In addition to its Casino supermarkets and hypermarkets, which closed in 2024, the group is developing the Géant (1970), Petit Casino and Casino Shop (1993, which became Casino in 2025) brands. The group also chose to develop a multi-brand strategy in the 1990s, under the leadership of Jean-Charles Naouri. It thus acquired various brands; Leader Price (1997), Vival (1999), Franprix (2007), Monoprix and Naturalia (2013).

=== International franchises ===
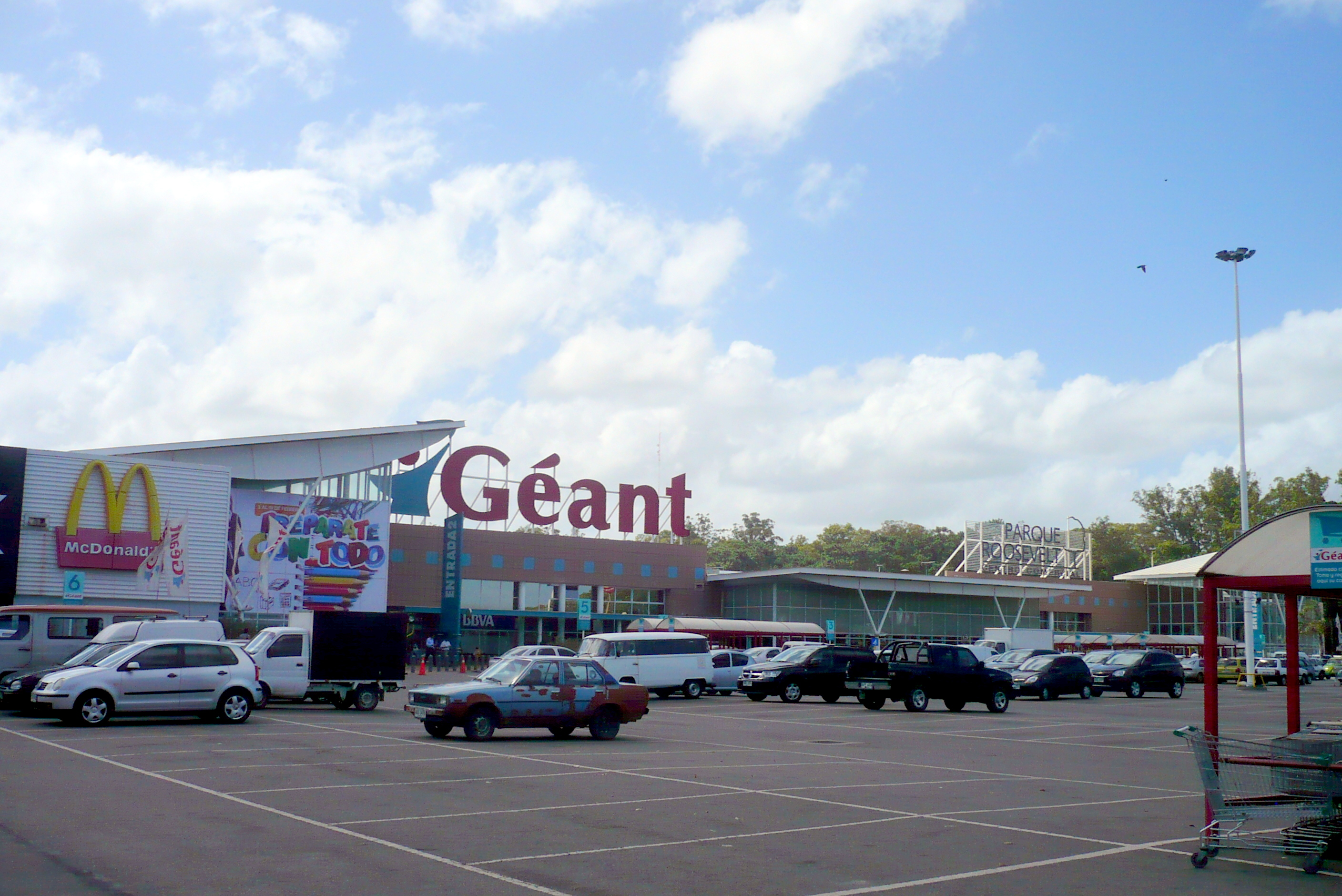
Géant in Ciudad de la Costa, Uruguay.

ExtenC is the subsidiary responsible for international franchises. By 2024, it will have 408 affiliated stores in 70 countries and territories.

When publishing its annual results in February 2025, ExtenC, its international subsidiary, announced that it had opened 18 new stores, mainly Géant Express brands in the United Arab Emirates and Monoprix in Tunisia.

=== Shareholdings ===
The group bought 26% of the capital in the Brazilian group GPA in 1999, before strengthening its position to 34.3% in 2005. In 2024, it reduces its stake to 22.5%.

=== E-business ===
Casino Group concentrates its e-business activity within the company Cnova, created in June 2014.

Cdiscount, branch of Casino Group, became over a few years a major e-business actor over the Internet in France.

In November 2023, Casino Group acquired a 34% stake in Cnova for €10 million. Stakes in the company increased to 98.8% following the deal.

=== Real estate ===
The real estate activity of Casino Group is driven in France by l’Immobilière Casino (which owns the walls of its stores) and its old brand Mercialys.

=== Sponsorship ===
Casino Group created a Company Foundation which supports childhood development by fighting against the cultural exclusion of the under-privileged. The Casino Corporate Foundation contributes to their education by funding theatre projects.

Founded in 2009, the Casino Foundation complements the other foundations of Casino Group present in France and in Latin America: the Exito Foundation in Colombia created in 1985, mainly engaged against child malnutrition, the GPA Institute which fosters youth education and their professional insertion and the Monoprix Foundation which fights against isolation in cities.

== Former locations ==
=== Kuwait, Bahrain and United Arab Emirates ===
In 2017, the Majid Al Futtaim Group purchased Retail Arabia, which owns the Géant stores, and replaced them with the Carrefour and Carrefour Market brands.

=== France ===
On 30 November 2020, the Casino group announced the sale of 554 Leader Price stores, out of a network of 640 stores, to ALDI. In its results for the first half of 2024, the Casino group announced that the Leader Price franchise activities are part of the discontinued operations.

For financial reasons, the group closed or sold all of its Casino supermarkets and Géant hypermarkets in France to competitors between June 2023 and October 2024.

=== Africa ===
In 2023, Mercure International of Monaco began replacing Casino and Géant brands with Super U in Congo-Brazzaville, Gabon and Senegal.

== Casino and the world of sport ==
=== Casino and sport association ===
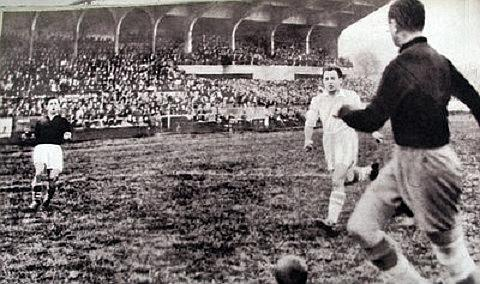
Scene of game between the Olympique de Marseille and the AS Saint-Etienne in 1938.

Casino Group is the origin of the AS Saint-Étienne football Club, which was created in 1919. The Sports Social Club of Saint-Étienne was born more precisely as a sports section of the «Employees' Social Club of the Casino store company,» the organization created in 1912 by Casino to support its sports corporatism policy. The Social Club logically takes on board the green color of the grocery chain.

A few months after the creation of the French Football Association-Federation (FFAF), the Social Club, more commonly named « AS Casino » (ASC), opened its football section in 1919, as well as other disciplines such as athletics and basketball. On 29 March 1920, under the initiative of Albert Jacquet, general secretary of the company, AS Casino became « the Social Sports Club » to respect the rules adopted by the Federation prohibiting the use of brands in the names of clubs, as well as keeping the initials. The club was then reserved for Casino employees, and the training center was located on the « Pont de l'âne » field, the property of the Group.

Seven years later, under the initiative of Pierre Guichard, son of Geoffroy Guichard who had become president of the club after MM. Godot and Jean Moulin, the Social Sports Club merged with the University Forez Stadium within the « Stéphanoise Sports Association » (SSA), which kept of course the green colour of the ASC.

In 1930, the French Federation voted for the adoption of professionalism in France. It became necessary for the SSA, whose managers were ambitious, to have its own stadium. The founder of Casino Group purchased a large field and gave it to the club. A membership offered to « friends » of the club helped gather the necessary funds to build the first facilities, later named Stade Geoffroy-Guichard.

=== Cyclism ===
In 1996, Casino Group became the main sponsor of the Chazal cycling team (currently AG2R Citroën Team). The team, therefore, took the name « Petit Casino – C'est votre équipe ». In the following year, Casino increased its funding and AG2R Provident Insurance became the second sponsor. The team doubled its budget, which went to 25 million Francs, and took the name "Casino-AG2R Prévoyance" from 1997 to 1999.

Casino's commitment finished at the end of the 1999 season. Over 3 years, the team also won 3 stages of the Tour de France, one stage of the Tour of Spain, 3 major classics and many national championships. It counted athletes such as Alexandre Vinokourov, Benoît Salmon or even Jaan Kirsipuu. The Casino Green is the traditional colour of Casino Group. It was the colour of the blinds in the former lyrical Casino, which was situated rue des Jardins in Saint-Etienne.

== Shareholding ==
Jean-Charles Naouri was the majority shareholder of Casino Group since 1992 via his Rallye SA company.

From 2024 a consortium led by Daniel Kretinsky will own and control 53.7% of Casino's share capital.

== Financial highlights ==
Key figures in € millions
Years	2008	2009	2010	2011	2012	2013	2014	2015	2016	2017
Net business volume	36,144	36,842	42,777	50,930	52,342					
Net sales	28,704	26,757	29,078	34,361	41,971	48,645	48,493	46,145	36,030	37,822
Trading profit	1,266	1,209	1,300	1,548	2,002	2,624	2,231	1,446	1,034	1,242
Equity	7,124	7,037	7,916	9,383	15,201	15,426	15,608			
Debt	4,851	4,072	3,845	5,379	5,451	5,416	5,822	6,073	3,367	4,126

Net business volume includes all revenue from consolidated companies, associates and franchisees, on a 100% basis.

== Share information ==
- Groupe Casino shares are listed on the NYSE Euronext Paris market (Compartment A)

ISIN: FR0000125585

- Par value: €1.53 per share
- Majority shareholders at end-2012 (voting rights): Free float: 38.6%; Groupe Rallye 59.3%; employees 2.1%.

Share data as at 1 January
Years	2011	2012	2013
Share outstanding (in million)	110.6	112.7	113.1
Market capitalisation (in € million)	7,200	8,100	9,500
Daily trading volume (in thousands of shares)	554	662	628

== Controversies ==
=== Kepler Cheuvreux ===
In August 2020, following anonymous threats and intimidations in Germany, the analyst stock, responsible for monitoring food retail trade from Kepler Cheuvreux, was forced to stop following Casino group and the German distribution brand Metro. The analyst had advised Kepler Cheuvreux's client investors to "hold" Metro's stock and to "reduce" their positions on Casino. Both groups have the Czech billionaire Daniel Kretinsky as a minority shareholder. He, along with the Casino group, condemned the threats addressed to the analyst. Neither Kepler Cheuvreux nor the analyst have commented on this matter. An investigation is currently underway by the German police, while the Financial Markets Authority (AMF) has declared to "regret" this situation. The financial watchdog also indicated having informed the public prosecutor.

=== Duty of Vigilance Law ===
In March 2020, eleven NGOs filed a lawsuit against the Casino group in French courts due to its sales in South America of products based on beef, allegedly from farms linked to illegal deforestation in the Amazon. The NGOs claim to base their case on the duty of vigilance law.

== See also ==
- Carrefour
- Companies of France
- European Retail Round Table
- List of companies of France
- List of hypermarkets
- Sherpa (brand)
