= Large-scale retail in France =

The large-scale retail sector in France consists of "hypermarkets and companies classified as large specialized retailers."

In 2014, the food retail industry employed 603,137 people.

In France, the hypermarket chains include: E.Leclerc, Carrefour, Intermarché Hyper, Hyper U, Auchan, and Casino. As of 2016, there were more than 2,000 hypermarkets and 10,000 supermarkets in the country, generating approximately €110 billion in revenue.

The distribution channels in this sector are highly diverse. In addition to supermarket operators like Intermarché Super, Carrefour Market, E.Leclerc Express, Super U, Casino Supermarché, SPAR Supermarché, Match, or Auchan Supermarché, other players operating in the hard-discount segment, such as Lidl, Aldi Nord, Netto, Leader Price, Supeco, and Norma, as well as shopping malls, generalist chains, and specialized brands.

== History of contemporary large-scale retail ==
The history of large-scale retail in France remains relatively unknown and under-researched by historians, with "mostly a few interesting economic studies and some family sagas or success stories recounted by journalists, testimonials from industry players, or communication agencies."

The 19th-century department stores, and pioneering grocery chains like Félix Potin and Casino, established several principles later adopted by large-scale retail: store size for department stores, fixed pricing, sales catalogs, promotional pricing, and the franchise model for Félix Potin. Self-service was introduced in 1948 with the opening of the first Goulet-Turpin store, measuring only 40 m², in Paris's 18th arrondissement. However, contemporary large-scale retail — defined by INSEE as "hypermarkets and companies classified as large specialized retailers" — emerged in France in the 1950s and 1960s. The first supermarkets were Goulet-Turpin in 1958, Carrefour in 1959, Auchan and Promodès in 1961, and Intermarché in 1970. The first European hypermarket was opened in France by Carrefour in Sainte-Geneviève-des-Bois in 1963. The hypermarket model was a French innovation, combining food and non-food items under one large roof, and remained a national specialty for a long time.

=== 1950–1960: Large-scale retail as the commercial arm of fordism ===
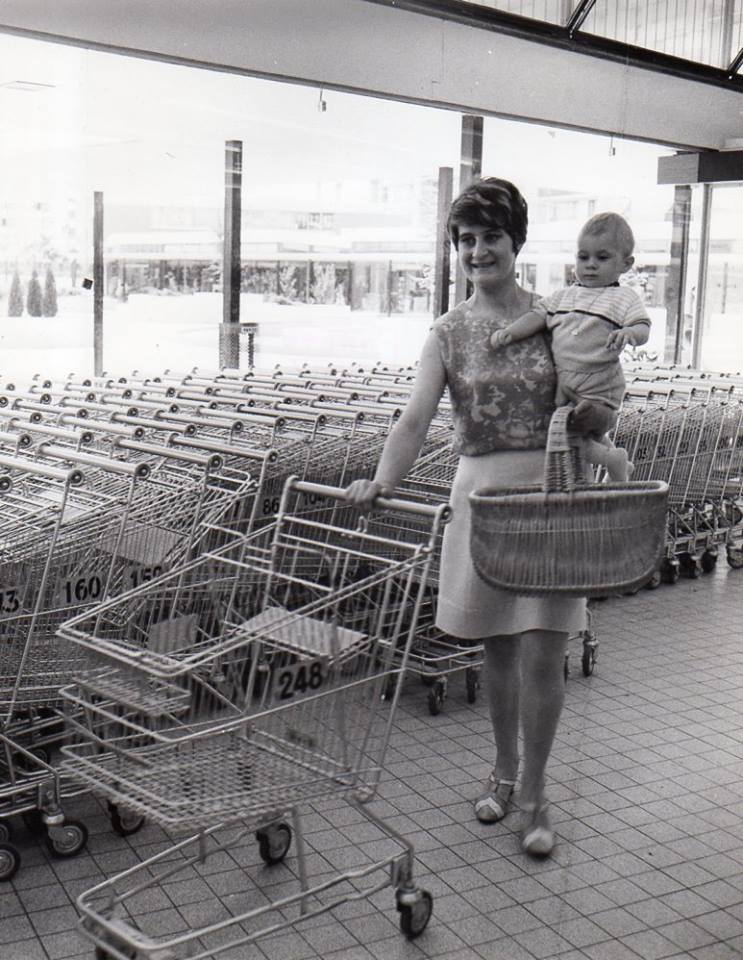
Advertisement for the shopping cart made in Drusenheim, 1960s.

According to Philippe Moati, large-scale retail can be seen as "the commercial avatar of Fordism," as it facilitated the sale of mass-produced goods in the 1960s after the country's post-war reconstruction. This mass production resulted from reduced transportation costs, industrial modernization, and the international opening of the French economy. Mass consumption and consumer society emerged in France from "a new wage compromise: unions accepted the consequences of Taylorist-Fordist principles on working conditions in exchange for real wage increases." The creation of the guaranteed minimum wage (SMIG) in 1950 and the social benefits of the welfare state allowed the average annual consumer budget to double between 1950 and 1968.

Although French large-scale retail appeared to lag behind its German and English counterparts in 1960, representing only 6% of the market, it progressed rapidly by implementing the "discount" model—a sales approach based on very low prices where "profitability stems not from unit margins but from asset turnover." At that time, the net margin for supermarkets was around 3%, compared to 7% for traditional grocery stores. In November 1959, Edouard Leclerc proposed to "reduce the cost of living by 20% by selling goods at wholesale prices directly purchased from manufacturers" and eliminating intermediary margins. The rapid turnover of stock and customer receivables enabled large-scale retail chains to place massive supplier orders, achieve economies of scale through the large size of retail locations, minimize labor costs by standardizing self-service practices, and implement a streamlined labor management system where the workforce was relatively unskilled and underpaid.

=== 1960–1980: The gold rush of large-scale retail ===
Between 1960 and 1972, French industrial production grew at an annual rate of 6.1%, while advertising expenditures were multiplied by five between 1952 and 1972. In addition to rising living standards, rural exodus, sustained high birth rates, and household car ownership contributed to new consumer behaviors and an unprecedented rise in large-scale retailing.

Initially, supermarket openings were driven by many actors, including food subsidiaries such as Félix Potin and Docks de France, consumer cooperatives like Maxicoop and Rond Point, and wholesalers such as Promodès and Major. Department stores—unlike Printemps, which began operating hypermarkets after 1969—and major industrial groups were more hesitant, with the notable exception of Auchan.

By the early 1970s, the main competitor to large-scale retail was no longer department stores or traditional shops. With the proliferation of retail outlets, competition among brands intensified, making it insufficient to offer low prices; retailers had to "be cheaper than the cheapest." As the size of the retail network became a key competitive factor, rapid expansion of new stores became essential. Large-scale retailers established unique relationships with suppliers: purchasing goods at low prices, negotiating extended payment terms (thereby benefiting from inter-company credit), and leveraging significant "back margins." Since most customers paid in cash, the resulting working capital allowed retailers to finance new store openings without resorting to loans or relinquishing control of often family-run businesses. In this expansion race, independent groups like Les Mousquetaires (Intermarché) and E.Leclerc were at an advantage, operating 15% of the nation's hypermarkets in 1979—a share that grew to 50% by 1997.

Carrefour's introduction of private-label products (PLPs) in 1976 highlighted the shifting power dynamic between retailers and suppliers. Unlike earlier strategies, such as Casino's integration of industrial production as early as 1901, retailers began purchasing large quantities from small and medium-sized enterprises (SMEs) and selling these products at prices significantly lower than branded goods, all while achieving higher margins. In the inflationary context following the first oil shock, large-scale retailers distinguished themselves by their relentless pursuit of lower prices.

A 2018 survey of fish counters in over 1,300 supermarkets revealed that 86% of fish sold came from unsustainable sources.

=== After 1980: A growth model to reinvent ===
It is difficult to speak of a crisis in large-scale retail when supermarkets and hypermarkets experienced annual revenue growth of 5% and 6.5%, respectively, between 1978 and 1996, despite a clear decline in sales emerging after 2008.

However, the extensive growth model that characterized the postwar boom—focused on low prices, eliminating intermediaries, and continually increasing retail space—gradually entered a crisis after 1980, particularly for hypermarkets. Growth potential began to show signs of saturation as household ownership of manufactured goods reached high levels, regulatory constraints tightened after 1990, and e-commerce and hard discount retailers gained momentum after 1995.

Simultaneously, there is a noticeable "disconnect between retailers and evolving consumer behavior," as consumers increasingly seek more varied products of better quality with higher symbolic value. Consumer behavior has become more individualized and "is increasingly resistant to being confined to a predefined category based on simple criteria (such as socio-professional status or age)."

By 1999, commercial density (Note: The term "commercial density" here refers to the number of square meters of medium and large retail spaces per inhabitant.) had reached 707 retail outlets per 1,000 inhabitants, and by 2012, 98% of French citizens were customers of large-scale retail. To adapt, the sector must develop new strategies and establish a new model of intensive growth.

=== Timeline of large-scale retail in France ===
The development of the large-scale retail sector is closely linked to the evolution of French society since 1945.

== Regulatory environment ==
The relationship between public authorities and large-scale retail is complex. Philippe Moati notes that "the attitude of public authorities toward large-scale retail has often been ambiguous," sometimes seeking to limit the expansion of large outlets while at other times promoting it in the name of combating inflation. Other experts argue that regulations have often been circumvented, giving rise to a significant system of corruption. "Given the prominence of these issues during the 1990s, the corruption processes deserve further study, particularly since they were decisive in shaping legislation concerning the opening of large retail outlets." Generally, lawmakers and political leaders have often been preoccupied with the electoral stakes posed by changes in commercial structures.

French actors in the large-scale retail sector are also quick to criticize regulations. For instance, E.Leclerc, on its website dedicated to the history of the E.Leclerc movement, outlines its "battles against legislation."

=== Control and regulation of retail sale prices ===
==== Price control or liberalization ====
At the end of World War II, the ordinances of June 30, 1945, established price control aimed at combating the rising inflation during a period of scarcity. This system quickly became unpopular among merchants and small businesses represented by the CGPME.

At the end of 1978, René Monory, Minister of Commerce and Industry under the Raymond Barre Government, liberalized the prices of goods in an inflationary context. The administrative regime was abandoned, but the Ministry of Finance sought to maintain regulatory power. The liberalization intensified with the Balladur ordinance of December 1, 1986. However, prices in certain sectors such as water, gas, and books (under the Lang Law) remained "regulated."

==== Galland law ====
In 1997, the law on the fairness and balance of commercial relations, known as the "Galland Law," removed back margins from the criteria for prohibiting sales at a loss. It was amended and partially replaced in January 2006 by the Jacob-Dutreil law, which no longer set a maximum price threshold but instead established a floor price for goods. The Galland Law required suppliers to publish a single official price list for their products for all distributors. This price, minus various discounts, rebates, or other unconditional elements listed on the sales invoice, could be included in the sale price and formed the gross margin. The law considers this price as the threshold for selling at a loss. Other elements, such as budgets provided by suppliers to distributors, usually at the end of the year for promotional efforts, highlighting products, or achieving quantitative purchase targets, are considered back margins and cannot be included in the sale price calculation, to avoid being classified as a sale at a loss, which is prohibited in France. This law sets a legal minimum price for items and leads to the standardization of retail prices for consumer goods in France, leaving distributors with only imports (negotiated tariffs abroad with an exclusive supplier) and private-label brands to differentiate themselves based on price.

Michel-Édouard Leclerc wrote in 2007: "France is the only country in Europe that has known only ten years of price freedom since World War II, between the Balladur ordinance of 1986 and the Galland law of 1997."

To reduce distributors' margins and thus lower sale prices—which helps increase household purchasing power—two laws were passed in 2008 under the Fillon government.

- In early 2008, the law for the development of competition in the service of consumers, known as the "Chatel Law," allowed distributors to transfer all back margins into sale prices but still did not permit negotiable tariffs between distributors and suppliers.
- The law for economic modernization, inspired by the Attali Commission, discussed in July 2008 and passed in August 2008, included an article that introduced negotiable purchasing tariffs between suppliers and distributors.

=== Competition regulation ===
==== Fontanet circular ====
The circular of March 31, 1960, concerning the prohibition of commercial practices that restrict competition, known as the "Fontanet Circular," prohibits the refusal to sell. In a context where "price-cutting pioneers like Édouard Leclerc are frowned upon by industrialists, producers, and despised by traditional merchants," no producer, industrialist, or agricultural supplier can refuse to sell, even to supermarkets that were rapidly expanding at the time.

==== Royer law ====
Law no. 73-1193 of December 27, 1973, on the orientation of commerce and craftsmanship, also known as the "Royer Law," aims to limit economic competition in the retail sector. It stipulates that "the public authorities ensure that the development of commerce and craftsmanship supports the growth of all types of businesses, whether independent, grouped, or integrated, while avoiding the chaotic expansion of new forms of distribution that could crush small businesses and waste commercial resources."

The context for this law's creation was increasing electoral pressure from small merchants and the agricultural sector. First, Pierre Poujade's Union for the Defense of Tradesmen and Artisans and later Gérard Nicoud's Inter-union Confederation for the Defense and National Union of Independent Workers opposed the rapid growth of large retailers, sometimes violently.

Departmental Commercial Urbanism Committees (CDUC) and the National Commercial Urbanism Commission (CNUC) were established in 1969. They limited the establishment of stores over 3,000 m^{2} through a prior review process before construction permits were granted. The Royer Law strengthened and made this control mandatory for retail spaces exceeding 1,000 m^{2}.

However, the Royer Law failed to curb the growth of large retail outlets. Instead, it fostered significant corruption, as seen in the Destrade and Trager cases. In several instances, decision-making bodies "monetized" their authorization for store openings: "It was as if the market law took revenge on the Royer Law, which sought to protect the small against the large, thus rebelling against one of the canons of economic liberalism. Competitors quickly analyzed regulatory constraints as inherent costs tied to the various 'arrangements' they had to make and incorporated these into their financial projections for their projects."

==== Raffarin law ====
The law of July 5, 1996, on the development and promotion of commerce and craftsmanship, known as the "Raffarin Law," reinforced the Royer Law by lowering the size threshold requiring authorization to 300 square meters. It also made obtaining authorizations more challenging (by altering the composition of the commissions, now renamed Departmental Commercial Equipment Commissions and National Commercial Equipment Commissions). The Raffarin Law "by halting the momentum of store creation (...) likely hindered productivity gains and reduced France's macroeconomic growth potential" while exerting an inflationary effect.

==== Economic modernization law ====
The Economic Modernization Law, passed in July 2008, aimed to increase household purchasing power by allowing price negotiations between suppliers and distributors. It bolstered competition in the retail sector by loosening restrictions on new store openings below 1,000 m^{2}, particularly in smaller communities. After 2008, the National Commercial Equipment Commission, renamed the National Commercial Planning Commission, became more permissive. The approval rate for store openings significantly increased: while fewer applications were submitted, they involved significantly larger retail spaces, averaging about 5,000 m^{2}.

==== Macron law (2015) ====
At the beginning of 2015, several amendments were introduced by Emmanuel Macron, then Minister of the Economy. Among these was the authorization for Sunday openings for retail spaces exceeding 400 square meters, in exchange for a 30% salary increase for Sunday work.

== Companies in the sector ==
=== Governance models ===
Grocery retail companies in France exhibit diverse identities, largely shaped by their governance models and historical backgrounds.

These can be classified into three main types:

- Integrated Groups: Owned and controlled by private shareholders and the stock market. Examples include Carrefour, Picard Surgelés, and Casino.
- Independent Cooperatives: Operate on the principle of cooperative members. Members own and operate one or more retail locations and are affiliated with a shared purchasing center and brand or banner. Examples include E.Leclerc, Les Mousquetaires, Biocoop, and Système U.
- Family-Owned Groups: Owned by a single family. Examples include Groupe Auchan, Aldi Nord, Louis Delhaize Group, and Lidl.

=== Average basket and annual visits by brand ===
In 2015, the average basket size and the number of annual visits varied across France, depending on the brand, store format, and catchment area.

== Statistical data ==
=== Distribution of stores and workforce by format ===
Format	Stores	%	Workforce	%
Hypermarkets	2 000	13,5%	302,900	55%
Supermarkets	10 000	49%	211,300	38%
Hard-discount	4,223	37,5%	36,400	7%
Total	16 223	100%	550,600	100%

=== Revenue of major French retail chains in Europe: Revenue in billions of euros ===
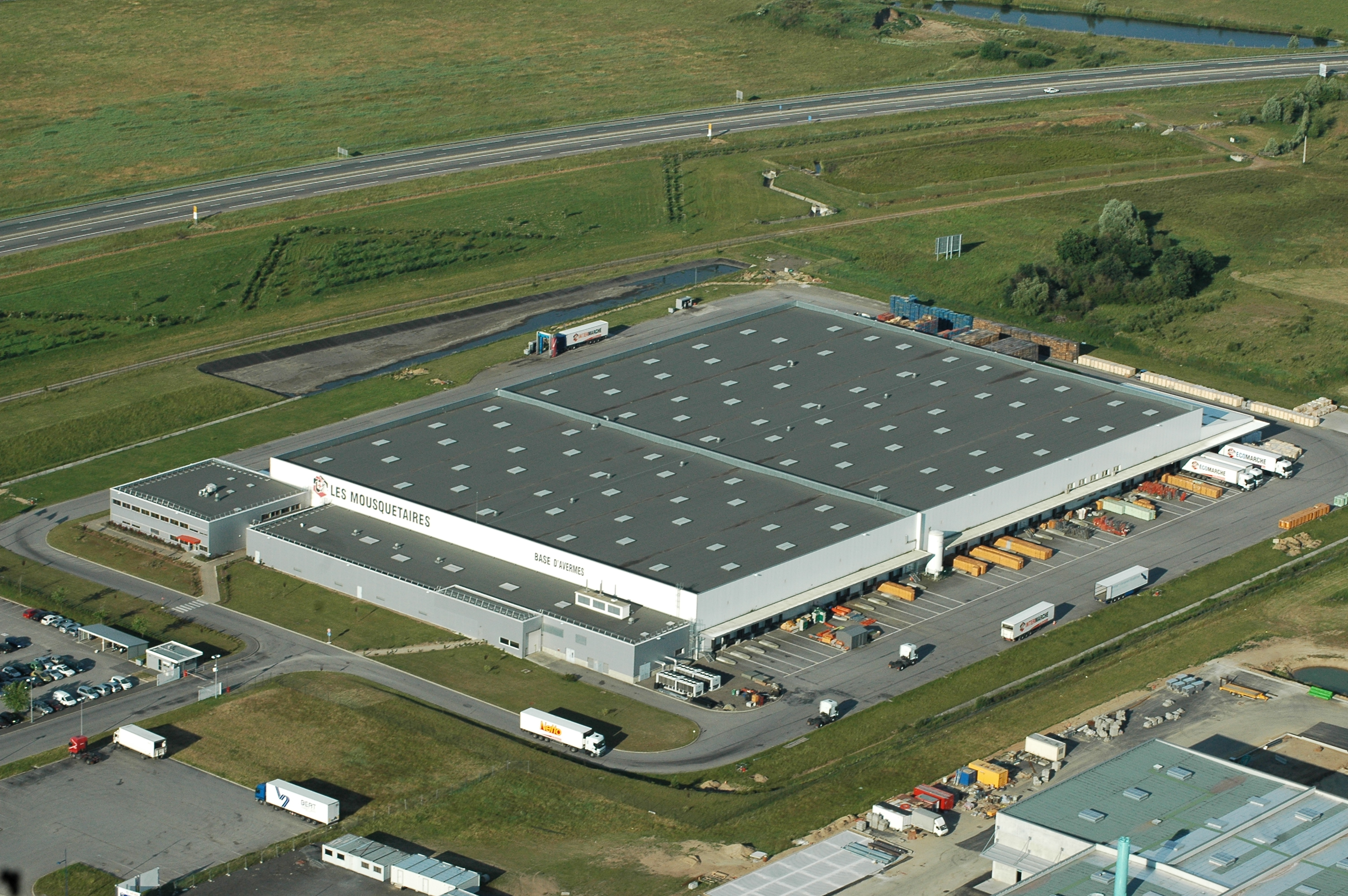
Les Mousquetaires distribution center, Avermes.

Company	2000	2001	2002	2003	2004	2005	2006	2007	2008	2009	2010	2011	2012	2013	2014
Carrefour	73.1	78	76.8	78.9	81.4	82	87.4	92.2	97.56	96.17	96.74	81.2			
Auchan	30.8	35.2	37.5	38.5	39.1	40.4	42.1	44.2	48.3	47.9	48.45				
E.Leclerc	23.8	25.1	26	27.2	28.4	28.5	29.4	30.3	34.7	34.97	36.16				
Intermarché	36.3	37.2	38.4	38.4	38	30.3	31.5	32.7	34.8	34	35				
Casino Guichard Perrachon	19.1	22	22.8	23	23.2	22.8	22.5	25	27.1	26.7					
Système U	10.5	11.7	12.7	13.8	14.7	15.1	15.6	16.8	17.5	17.9					

=== Market share of major retail groups in France ===
Market share of the main distribution groups in France, including online orders
Company	2020	2023
E.Leclerc (E.Leclerc + E.Leclerc Express)	23.3%	22.7%
Groupe Carrefour (Carrefour + Carrefour Market + Carrefour Contact + Carrefour City + Carrefour Express + Carrefour Montagne + PromoCash + Supeco + Proxi + Bio c'bon)	19.1%	20.4%
Les Mousquetaires (Intermarché Hyper/Super/Contact/Express + Netto)	15.7%	15.9%
Système U (Hyper U + Super U + U Express + Utile)	10.5%	11.9%
Auchan (Auchan + Auchan Supermarché + MyAuchan)	9.8%	9%
Lidl	6.4%	7.9%
Groupe Casino (Casino#hyperFrais + Casino Supermarché + Monoprix + Monop' + Naturalia + Leader Price + Franprix + the market next door + Vival + SPAR + SPAR Supermarché + Sherpa Supermarché + Casino Shop + Petit Casino + Le Petit Casino + Casino Shopping)	9.4%	5.9%
Aldi Nord	2.4%	3%
Delhaize (Cora + Match)	2.8%	2.1%

=== Ranking of hypermarkets by retail space ===
Although a comprehensive list is hard to find, the largest French hypermarkets by retail space in 2010, as reported by Linéaires magazine, were noted.

N°	Brand	Location	Area	Opening
1	Carrefour	Villiers-en-Bière, Seine-et-Marne (77), Île-de-France	25 000 m^{2}	1971
2	Auchan	Noyelles-Godault, Pas-de-Calais (62), Douai-Lens agglomeration	21 850 m^{2}	1972
3	Carrefour	Vitrolles, Bouches-du-Rhône (13), Marseille agglomeration	20 000 m^{2}	
4	Auchan	Vélizy, Yvelines (78), Île-de-France	19 800 m^{2}	1986
5	Carrefour	Aulnay-sous-Bois, Seine-Saint-Denis (93), Île-de-France	19 355 m^{2}	
6	Carrefour	Montesson, Yvelines (78), Île-de-France	18 000 m^{2}	
7	Carrefour	Portet-sur-Garonne, Haute-Garonne (31), Toulouse agglomeration	18 000 m^{2} (25 000 m^{2} in 2008)	1972
8	Carrefour	Claye-Souilly, Seine-et-Marne (77), Île-de-France	18 000 m^{2}	
9	Auchan	Le Pontet, Vaucluse (84), Avignon agglomeration	17 924 m^{2}	
10	Auchan	Bordeaux-Lac, Gironde (33)	17 615 m^{2}	

=== Ranking of hypermarkets by revenue ===
According to Linéaires magazine, the ten largest hypermarkets in France by revenue (excluding fuel sales) in 2015 were identified based on their 2014 financial figures.

N°	Brand	Location	Sales in 2014	Opening
1	Auchan	Vélizy, Yvelines (78), Île-de-France	282.2 millions	
2	Auchan	Aubagne, Bouches-du-Rhône (13), Marseille agglomeration	261.7 millions	
3	Auchan	Englos, Nord (59), Lille agglomeration	248.2 millions	
4	Auchan	Roncq, Nord (59), Lille agglomeration	244.3 millions	
5	Carrefour	Antibes, Alpes-Maritimes (06)	238.3 millions	
6	Auchan	Saint-Priest, Rhône (69), Lyon agglomeration	227.7 millions	
7	Carrefour	Montesson, Yvelines (78), Île-de-France	214.2 millions	
8	Auchan	Leers, Nord (59), Lille agglomeration	209.8 millions	
9	Auchan	Noyelles-Godault, Pas-de-Calais (62), Douai-Lens agglomeration	208.6 millions	
10	Auchan	Le Pontet, Vaucluse (84), Avignon agglomeration	207.4 millions	

In 2014, 12 hypermarkets in France exceeded an annual revenue threshold of €200 million.

Among the top 50 hypermarkets in France by non-fuel revenue in 2014, the breakdown was as follows: 30 belonged to Auchan, 16 to Carrefour, and 4 to Leclerc.

== See also ==
- Retail
- List of supermarket chains in France
- Distribution (marketing)
- Group purchasing organization

== Bibliography ==
- Valentin, Julie; Julie, Julie (1998). "Grande distribution : le paradoxe de l'effet-prix" [Supermarkets: the price effect paradox]. Économie rurale (in French) (245–246): 33–40. Archived from the original on March 27, 2014.
- Dreyfus, Jean-Luc (1999). "Grande distribution : vers la communication globale" [Retail: towards global communication]. Communication et Langages (in French). 122 (122): 103–117. doi:10.3406/colan.1999.2971. Archived from the original on June 5, 2018.
- D'Hauteville, François (2000). "La grande distribution alimentaire : la recherche est-elle en phase avec l'histoire ?" [Food retailing: is research in step with history?]. Économie rurale (in French). 255 (255–256): 72–85. doi:10.3406/ecoru.2000.5158. Archived from the original on June 4, 2018.
- Hassan, Jean-Claude (2000). "La distribution en France : un système en crise" [French retailing: a system in crisis]. Communication et Langages (in French) (124): 4–18. Archived from the original on March 27, 2014.
- Jacquiau, Christian (2000). Les coulisses de la grande distribution [Behind the scenes in retail] (in French). Paris: Albin Michel. ISBN 2-226-11506-4.
- Moati, Philippe (2001). L'avenir de la grande distribution [The future of supermarket distribution] (in French). Paris: Odile Jacob. ISBN 2-7381-0959-4.
- Dumans, Marie-Elise; Chambolle, Claire (2002). "Internet et la grande distribution alimentaire française" [The Internet and French food retailing]. Économie rurale (in French) (272): 42–56. Archived from the original on June 3, 2018.
- Cliquet, Gérard; Fady, André; Basset, Guy (2002). Management de la distribution [Distribution management] (in French). Paris: Dunod. ISBN 2-10-005551-8.
- Bothorel, Jean; Sassier, Philippe (2005). La grande distribution : Enquête sur une corruption à la française [Supermarkets: Investigating French-style corruption] (in French). Paris: Bourin. ISBN 2-84941-022-5.
- Canivet, Guy (2005). Restaurer la concurrence par les prix : Les produits de grande consommation et les relations entre industrie et commerce [Restoring price competition: FMCG products and the relationship between industry and commerce] (PDF). Rapports officiels (in French). Paris: La Documentation Française. ISBN 2-11-005853-6. Archived from the original (PDF) on September 27, 2017.
- Chessel, Marie-Emmanuelle; Chatriot, Alain (2006). "L'histoire de la distribution : un chantier inachevé" [The history of distribution: an unfinished project]. Histoire, Économie et Société (in French) (25): 67–82. ISSN 0752-5702. Archived from the original on March 27, 2014.
- Askenazy, Philippe; Weidenfeld, Katia (2007). Les soldes de la loi Raffarin : Le contrôle du grand commerce alimentaire [Sales under the Raffarin law: Controlling large food retailers] (PDF). Cepremap (in French). Paris: Ed. Rue d'Ulm. ISBN 978-2-7288-0384-2. Archived from the original (PDF) on May 14, 2014.
- Waelli, Mathias (2009). Caissière... et après ? : Une enquête parmi les travailleurs de la grande distribution [Cashier... and after? A survey of retail workers] (PDF). Cepremap (in French). Paris: Presses universitaires de France. ISBN 978-2-13-057333-3. Archived from the original (PDF) on May 14, 2014.
- Eurogroup Consulting; Responsibility Management (September 2012). "La grande distribution et l'évolution de notre société" [Mass retailing and the evolution of our society]. Eurogroup Consulting website (in French). Archived from the original on September 7, 2015.
- Benquet, Marlène (2013). Encaisser ! : Enquête en immersion dans la grande distribution [Cash in! Immersive investigation in the retail industry] (in French). Paris: La Découverte. ISBN 978-2-7071-7582-3.
