= List of supermarket chains in France =

This is a list of supermarket chains in France

== List of current French supermarket chains ==
Name	Stores	Type of store	Parent
Hyper U	~ 66	Hypermarket	Coopérative U
Super U	773	Supermarket	Coopérative U
U Express, Utile	~ 700	Convenience store	Coopérative U
Intermarché	1 835	Convenience store/Hypermarket/Supermarket	Les Mousquetaires
Netto	300+	Discounter	Les Mousquetaires
Auchan	165	Hypermarket	Auchan
Auchan Supermarché	725	Supermarket	Auchan
Costco	3	Warehouse club	Costco Wholesale Corporation
SPAR	864	Convenience store/Grocery store	Groupe Casino
Franprix	827	Convenience store	Groupe Casino
Monoprix	640	Supermarket	Groupe Casino
naturéO	Unknown	Organic supermarket	
Naturalia	200+	Organic supermarket	Groupe Casino
Carrefour	248	Hypermarket	Carrefour Group
Carrefour Market	1 071	Supermarket	Carrefour Group
Carrefour Contact, Carrefour City, Carrefour Express, Carrefour Bio, Proxi	3959	Convenience store	Carrefour Group
Supeco	32	Discounter	Carrefour Group
E. Leclerc	~ 600	Hypermarket/Supermarket	E. Leclerc
E.Leclerc Express	60	Convenience store	E.Leclerc
Match	117	Supermarket	Louis Delhaize Group
Lidl	1500+	Discounter	Schwarz Gruppe
Aldi	891	Discounter	Aldi Nord
Norma	71	Discounter	Norma
Colruyt	75	Supermarket	Colruyt Group
Metro Cash and Carry	94	Cash and carry	Metro AG

== See also ==
- For supermarkets worldwide see List of supermarkets
- Large-scale retail in France
