= Netto (France) =

French discount supermarket chain

- Company type: Public
- Industry: Retail
- Founded: 2001
- Products: Supermarket
- Website: Netto website (French only)

Netto is a French discount supermarket chain owned by the Les Mousquetaires group. Previously known as Comptoir des Marchands, the chain changed its name to Netto in 2001. As of November 2025 there are over 370 Netto stores in France.

Netto's old logo

This chain of stores is neither owned nor affiliated with the Netto owned by the Danish Salling Group or the Netto owned by the German Edeka Group, even if they shared the same logo.

== Les Mousquetaires family ==
Netto is controlled by the Les Mousquetaires family, owners of the supermarket chain Intermarché. 'Les Mousquetaires' have created a number of companies:

- Intermarché (Supermarket)
- Bricomarché (DIY Shops)
- Restaumarché (Restaurants)
- Ecomarché

== See also ==
- List of French companies
- List of supermarket chains in France
