= Veti =

Veti may refer to:

- Veti, Dahanu, a village in Maharashtra, India
- Vêti, a French clothing shop
- AS Veti, a football club in Congo
