= Nelly Chatué Diop =

Cameroonian computer scientist (1984/1985–2026)

- Born: 1984 or 1985
- Died: 8 January 2026 (aged 41)
- Education: École Supérieure de Chimie Physique Électronique de Lyon; HEC Paris (MBA); London Business School
- Occupation: Computer scientist

Nelly Chatué Diop (1984 or 1985 – 8 January 2026) was a Cameroonian computer scientist.

== Life and career ==
Born in Cameroon, Chatué was awarded a scholarship from the French Ministry of Foreign Affairs to study at the École Supérieure de Chimie Physique Électronique de Lyon. In 2006, she began her MBA program at HEC Paris, during which she participated in an exchange program at London Business School.

At the beginning of her career, Chatué specialized in data and blockchains. She worked as a software developer in London before returning to France to work for an American SME. In 2013, she established the pricing and data department at Groupe Casino, creating similar departments at Darty in 2015 and Betclic in 2017.

In 2020, Chatué ventured into entrepreneurship, founding the startup Ejara.io with Baptiste Andrieux, which was a blockchain-based mobile investment platform designed for the French, African, and diaspora markets. Her mission was to democratize cryptocurrency. By October 2021, she had raised US$2 million for the firm.

In 2013, she was the recipient of the "Femme Engagée" prize in the French large-scale retail sector. In 2018, she was included among the top ten data directors in Europe. In May 2020, she was included in a global list of influential women in data leadership by CDO Magazine. In June 2020, she was named one of the top 100 Global Data Visionaries.

Chatué Diop died following a sudden illness on 8 January 2026, at the age of 41.
