= Hélène and Édouard Leclerc Fund for Culture =

French endowment fund

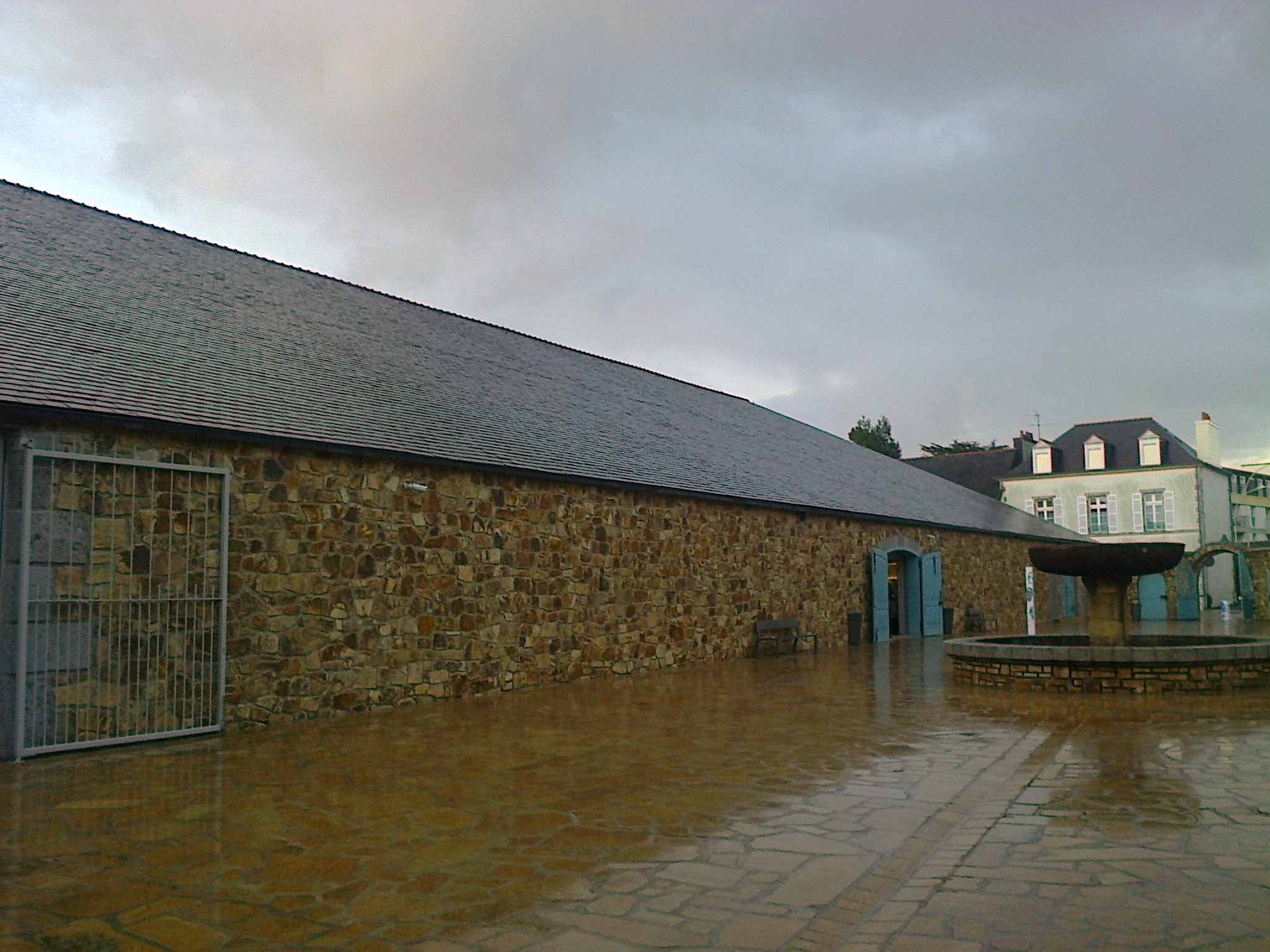
- Domaine des Capucins, Landerneau; inner courtyard and former Leclerc store, a hall transformed into the exhibition space of the Hélène and Édouard Leclerc Fund for Culture

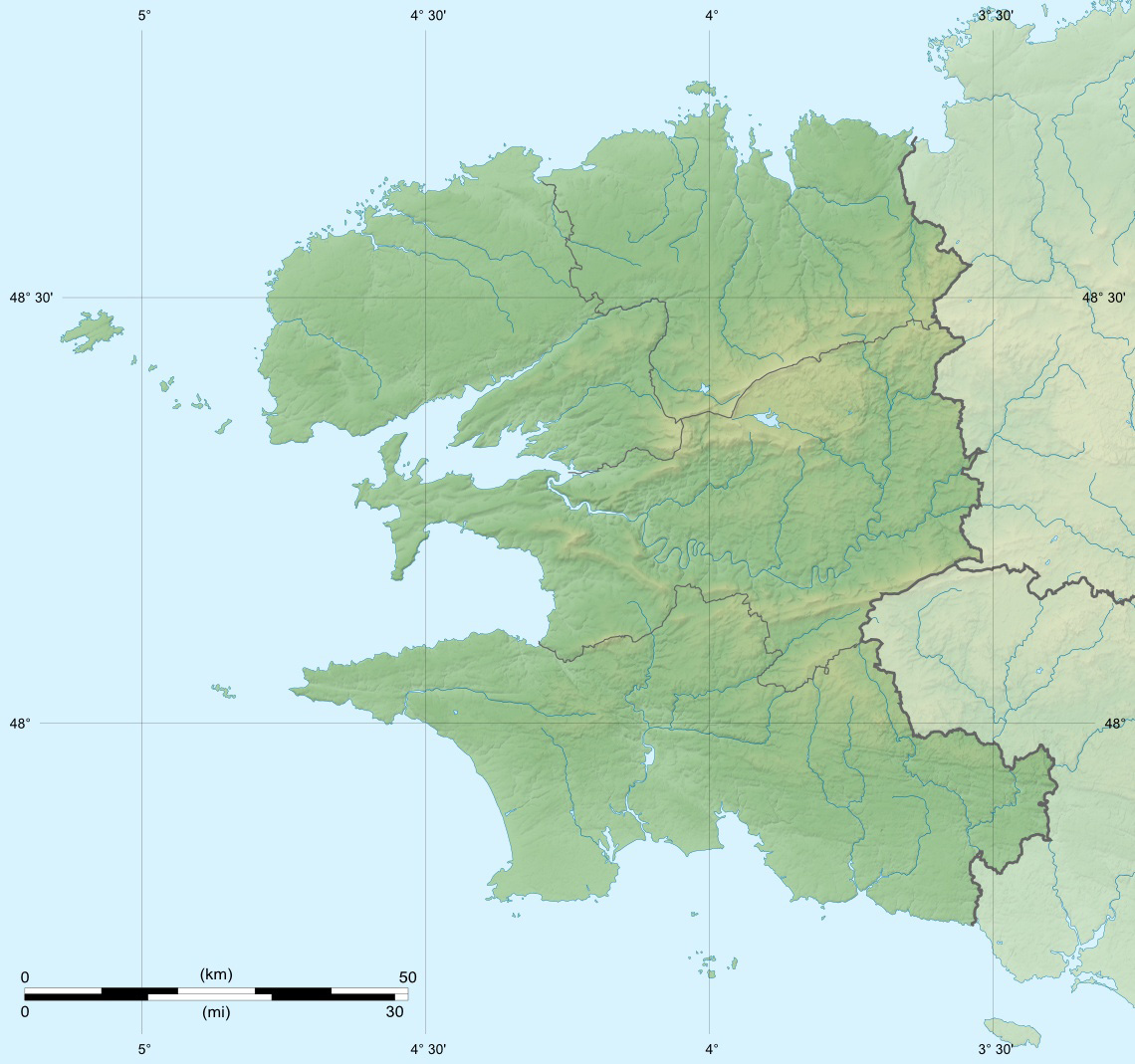
- Location in Finistère
- Established: June 23, 2012
- Location: Rue des Capucins; 29800 Landerneau
- Coordinates: 48.4529°N 4.254°W
- Type: Modern and contemporary art
- Collection size: Art of the 20th and 21st centuries
- Website: fonds-culturel-leclerc.fr

The Hélène and Édouard Leclerc Fund for Culture is a private endowment fund in France dedicated to contemporary art, located in Landerneau, near Brest, in the department of Finistère, Brittany, France.

The fund seeks to democratize access to art by organizing exhibitions featuring major figures of modern and contemporary creation.

== History ==
The center is located on the site of the former Capuchin convent—built in the 17th century—which later housed the first Leclerc hypermarket until 1986. It was there that Édouard Leclerc and his wife Hélène decided to establish a space dedicated to contemporary art. The fund was created in 2011 and is chaired by Michel-Édouard Leclerc, son of the founders.

It was officially inaugurated on June 23, 2012, in the presence of Hélène Leclerc, former Minister of Culture Jean-Jacques Aillagon, and featured its first exhibition, dedicated to the artist Gérard Fromanger, who was also in attendance.

== The site ==
In 1986, the Leclerc hypermarket located in the large hall built to the northwest of the former Capuchin convent closed due to limited space, with a larger Leclerc center opening in the outskirts of Landerneau. Meanwhile, the convent had been listed as a monument historique in 1970, making major alterations to the site difficult. It was then that Édouard and Hélène Leclerc conceived the idea of revitalizing this emblematic site of Landerneau.

The outer walls of the former Leclerc hypermarket were clad in golden‑ochre Logonna stone, a regional microgranite, while the roof was covered in slate. The adjoining 17th‑century structures—including the former offices, courtyard, and chapel—were also restored.

== Visitors ==
The fund aims to make contemporary art accessible to the widest possible audience, particularly school groups. Around 125,000 visitors attended the exhibition dedicated to Joan Miró in 2013, and approximately 140,000 came to view the works of Alberto Giacometti in 2015.

The exhibitions are also accompanied by publications—initially through Éditions Textuel, and later through the fund’s own publishing house.

== Exhibitions ==
Since 2012, the Fonds Hélène et Édouard Leclerc pour la culture has hosted two exhibitions per year:

- Gérard Fromanger – Périodisation 1962–2012, from 24 June to 28 October 2012.
- Yann Kersalé – À des Nuits Lumière. La ville / La nuit / La mer, from 15 December 2012 to 19 May 2013.
- Joan Miró – L'Arlequin artificier (The Harlequin Fireworker), from 16 June to 3 November 2013.
- Métal hurlant, (À suivre) : 1975–1997. La Bande Dessinée fait sa Révolution (The Comic Book Revolution), from 15 December 2013 to 11 May 2014.
- Dubuffet – L'Insoumis (The Rebel), from 22 June to 2 November 2014.
- Jacques Monory, from 14 December 2014 to 17 May 2015.
- Alberto Giacometti, from 14 June to 31 October 2015.
- Mattotti – Infini, from 6 December 2015 to 6 March 2016.
- La 3e Scène de l'Opéra national de Paris, from 10 April to 16 May 2016.
- Chagall – De la Poésie à la Peinture (From Poetry to Painting), from 26 June to 1 November 2016.
- Hartung et les peintres lyriques (Hartung and the Lyrical Painters), from 11 December 2016 to 17 April 2017.
- Picasso, from 25 June to 1 November 2017.
- Libres Figurations – Années 80 (Free Figurations – The 1980s), from 10 December 2017 to 2 April 2018.
- Henry Moore, from 10 June to 4 November 2018.
- Mitchell | Riopelle – Un couple dans la démesure (A Couple Beyond Measure), from 16 December 2018 to 22 April 2019.
- Cabinets de curiosités (Cabinets of Curiosities), from 23 June to 3 November 2019.
- Vladimir Veličković, from 15 December 2019 to 26 April 2020.
- Enki Bilal, from 18 July 2020 to 29 August 2021.
- Françoise Pétrovitch, from 17 October 2021 to 3 April 2022.
- Ernest Pignon-Ernest, from 12 June 2022 to 15 January 2023.
- In the Footsteps of Tolkien and the Medieval Imagination – Paintings and Drawings by John Howe, from 25 June 2023 to 28 January 2024.
- Henri Cartier-Bresson, from 15 June 2024 to 5 January 2025.

=== Current exhibitions ===
- Animal!?, from 14 June to 2 November 2025.

== Publications ==
=== Publications by the Fonds Hélène et Édouard Leclerc pour la culture ===
- Métal hurlant 1975–1987 (À suivre) 1978–1997 – Comic books make their revolution…, Fonds Hélène et Édouard Leclerc pour la culture, 2013, ISBN 978-2-9546155-0-9 ;
- Dubuffet the Unsubmissive, Fonds Hélène et Édouard Leclerc pour la culture, 2014, ISBN 978-2-9546155-2-3 ;
- Jacques Monory, Fonds Hélène et Édouard Leclerc pour la culture, 2014, ISBN 978-2-9546155-3-0 ;
- Alberto Giacometti, Fonds Hélène et Édouard Leclerc pour the culture, 2015, ISBN 978-2-9546155-4-7 ;
- Mattotti Infinite, Fonds Hélène et Édouard Leclerc pour la culture, 2015, ISBN 978-2-9546155-5-4 ;
- Chagall – From Poetry to Painting, Fonds Hélène et Édouard Leclerc pour la culture, 2016, ISBN 978-2-9546155-9-2 ;
- 3rd Stage, Paris National Opera, Fonds Hélène et Édouard Leclerc pour la culture, 2016, ISBN 978-2-9546155-6-1 ;
- Hartung and the Lyrical Painters, Fonds Hélène et Édouard Leclerc pour la culture, 2016, ISBN 979-10-96209-00-2 ;
- Picasso, Fonds Hélène et Édouard Leclerc pour la culture, 2017, ISBN 979-10-96209-01-9 ;
- Free Figurations – The 1980s, Fonds Hélène et Édouard Leclerc pour la culture, 2017, ISBN 979-10-96209-02-6 ;
- Henry Moore, Fonds Hélène et Édouard Leclerc pour la culture, 2018, ISBN 979-10-96209-03-3 ;
- Cabinets of Curiosities, Fonds Hélène et Édouard Leclerc pour la culture, 2019, ISBN 979-10-96209-05-7 ;
- Veličković – The Grand Style and the Tragic, Fonds Hélène et Édouard Leclerc pour la culture, 2019, ISBN 979-10-96209-07-1 ;
- Enki Bilal, Fonds Hélène et Édouard Leclerc pour la culture, 2020, ISBN 979-10-96209-10-1 ;
- Françoise Pétrovitch, Fonds Hélène et Édouard Leclerc pour la culture, 2021, ISBN 979-10-96209-09-5 ;
- Ernest Pignon-Ernest, Fonds Hélène et Édouard Leclerc pour la culture, 2022, ISBN 979-10-96209-12-5 ;
- In the Footsteps of Tolkien and the Medieval Imagination, Fonds Hélène et Édouard Leclerc pour la culture, 2023, ISBN 979-10-96209-14-9 ;
- Henri Cartier-Bresson, Fonds Hélène et Édouard Leclerc pour la culture, 2024, ISBN 979-10-96209-17-0.

== Gallery ==
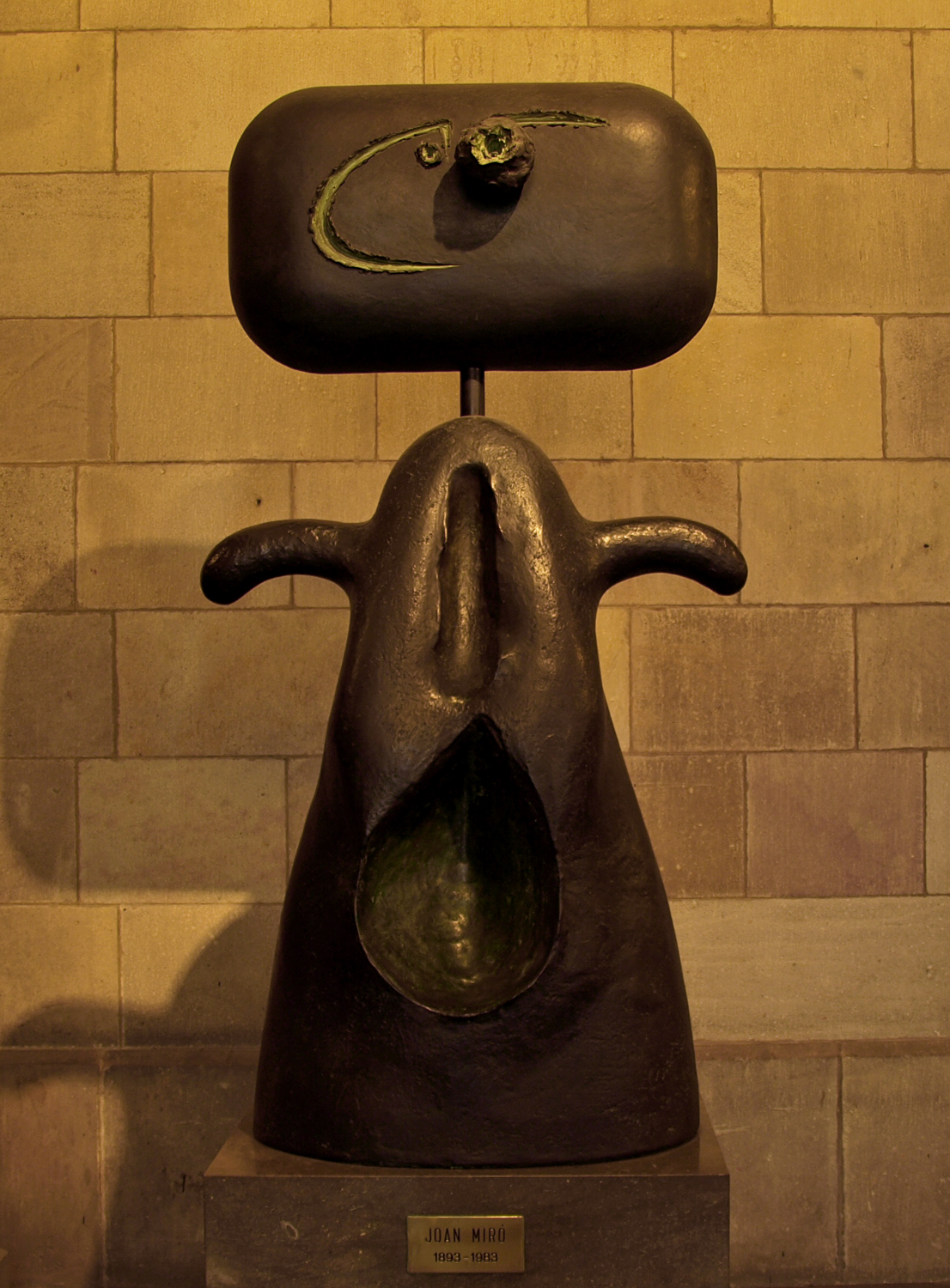
Woman «Mujer» – Joan Miró – 1983 (artwork displayed at the Capucins during the 2013 exhibition dedicated to the artist)

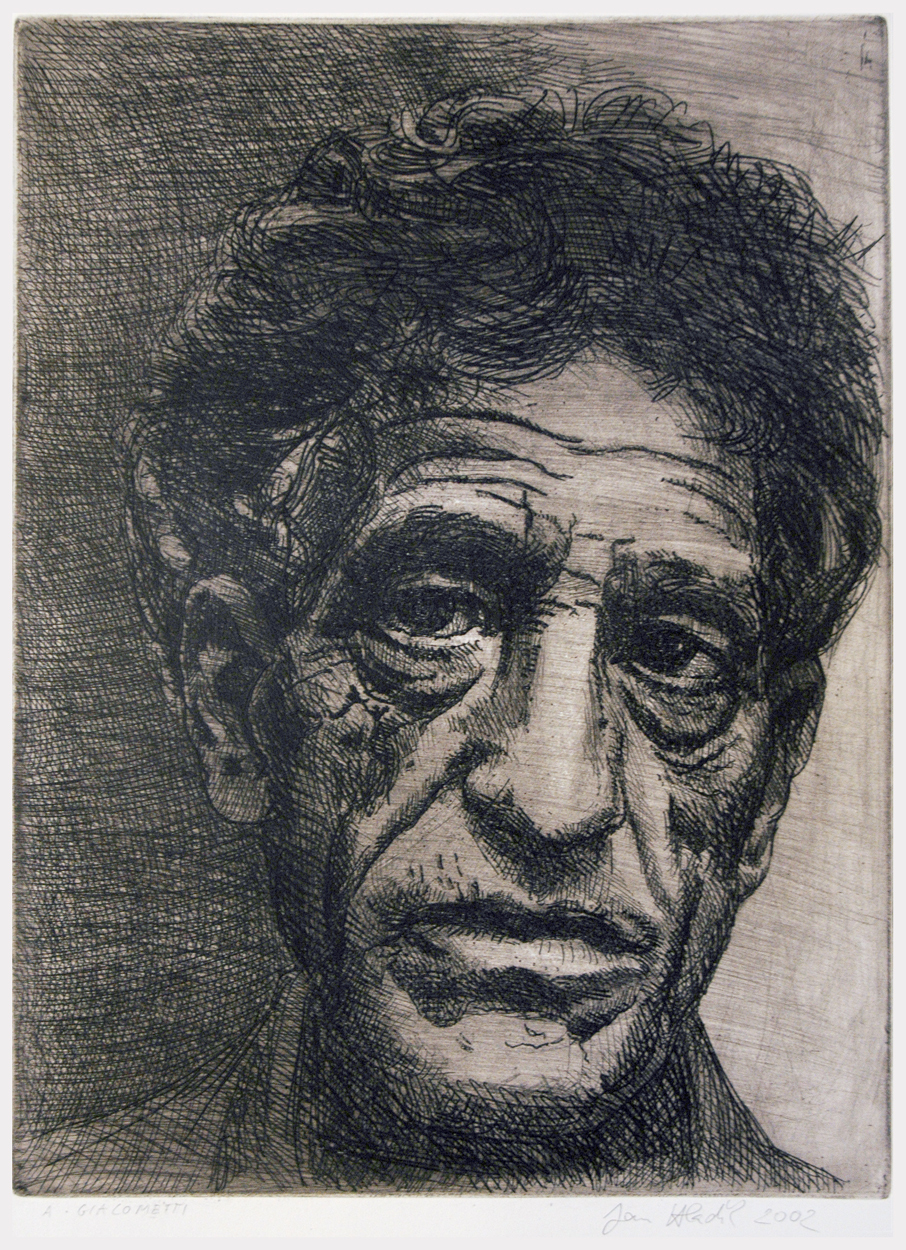
Alberto Giacometti, by Jan Hladík, 2002

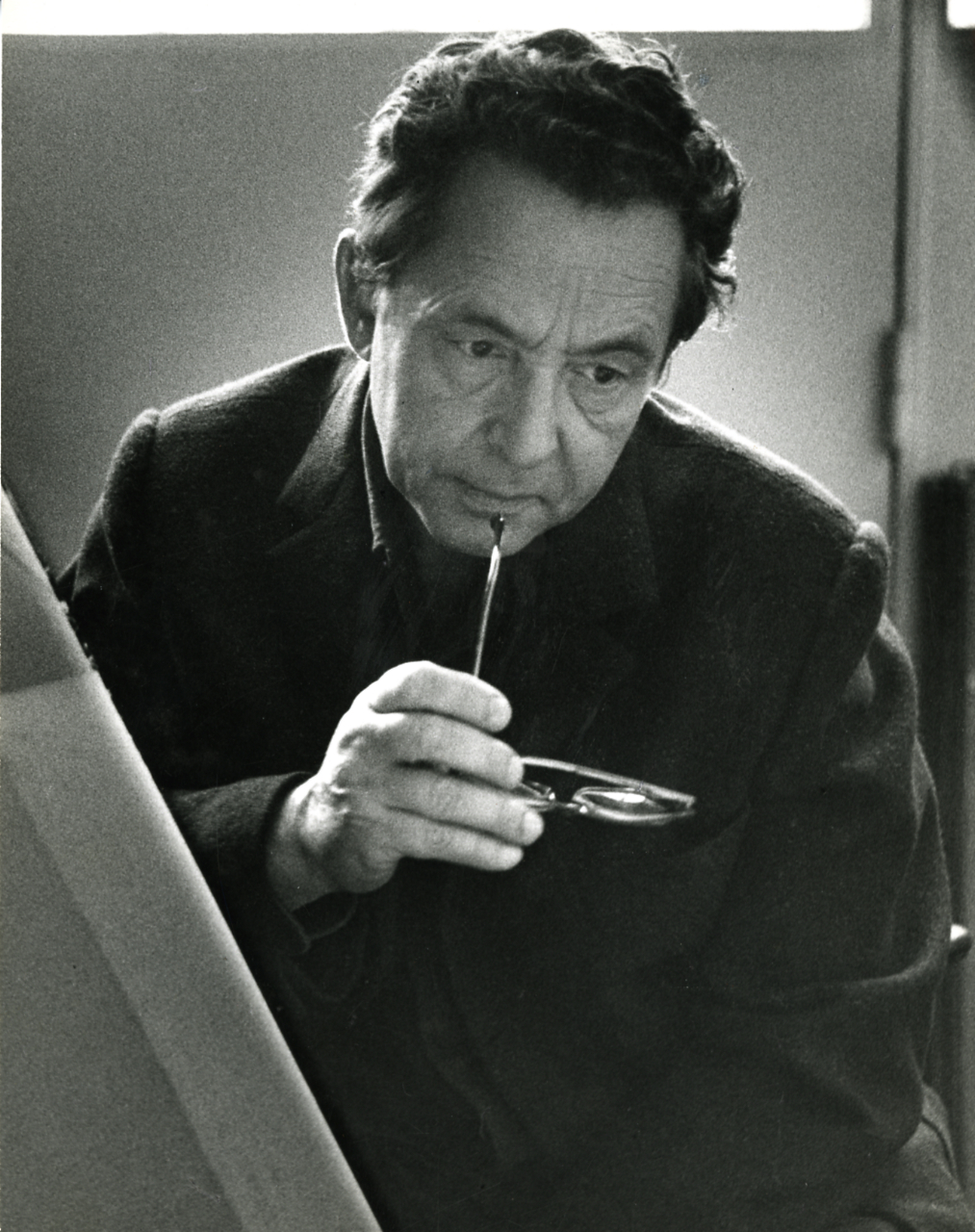
Hans Hartung
