= Fair and Balanced Trading Act =

French law regulating commercial relations between retailers and suppliers

Loi Galland

Tenth Legislature of the Fifth Republic
- Long title: Loi n°96-588 du 1er juillet 1996 sur la loyauté et l’équilibre des relations commerciales
- Citation: NOR: ECOX9600012L
- Territorial extent: France
- Passed by: Juppé II Government
- Passed: 21 June 1996
- Assented to: 1 July 1996
- Effective: 3 July 1996

The Loi n°96-588 of 1 July 1996 on the fairness and balance of commercial relations, commonly known as the Galland Law, is a French law aimed at regulating relationships between large-scale retailers and their suppliers, while protecting small businesses and suppliers. It prohibited large retailers from fully passing on discounts and commercial service fees received from suppliers to consumer sale prices.

Promulgated on 1 July 1996 under the second Juppé government, the law took effect on 1 January 1997.

== History ==
The law is named after Yves Galland, the Minister Delegate for Finance and Foreign Trade.

The legislation amended Ordinance No. 86-1243 of 1 December 1986, known as the "Balladur Ordinance," which had liberalized pricing rules and penalized selling below cost. As the growing dominance and concentration of large retailers disrupted the balance of commercial relationships to the detriment of suppliers, the Galland Law introduced the concept of "abusively low prices" and redefined the calculation of the selling-below-cost threshold by distinguishing between front margins, which could be reflected in sale prices, and back margins.

The law faced criticism soon after its implementation. In 1997, several politicians highlighted price increases on over a thousand products, particularly branded goods. By 1999, manufacturers accused retailers of abusive practices, prompting parliamentarians to call for an inquiry. In 2002, Leclerc stores launched an advertising campaign blaming the Galland Law for rising prices.

In June 2004, under the leadership of Nicolas Sarkozy, then Minister of the Economy, major retailers agreed to curb inflation observed earlier that year on everyday consumer goods. The agreement allowed greater flexibility in commercial negotiations under the Galland Law while maintaining the prohibition on selling below cost. Signed on 17 June 2004, the agreement mandated a 2% price reduction in hypermarkets on approximately 5,000 consumer goods starting in September 2004, followed by a further 1% reduction in 2005, with both large manufacturers and retailers required to reduce their commercial margins.

Subsequently, the Canivet Commission, a panel of experts, was tasked with reviewing existing legislation to improve professional relationships and strengthen price-based competition mechanisms.

== Legacy ==
Following the Canivet Commission's analysis and reform proposals, the "SME Law," also known as the "Dutreil II Law," was enacted on 2 August 2005. This law built upon and expanded the Galland Law. Its implementing decrees, effective from 1 January 2006, amended Article L. 442-2 of the French Commercial Code, allowing retailers to incorporate all financial benefits (back margins) exceeding 20% in 2006 and 15% in 2007 into their cost prices. However, these provisions were complex to implement, with Michel-Édouard Leclerc describing them as "Kafkaesque."

== Analysis ==
A 2007 study by Philippe Askenazy estimated that the Galland Law led to a 7% increase in prices, raised the operating margin of affected companies from 3.5% to 6%, and prevented the creation of 50,000 jobs.

== See also ==
- Competition law
- Loss leader
- Retail sector in France
