= Michel-Édouard Leclerc =

French business executive

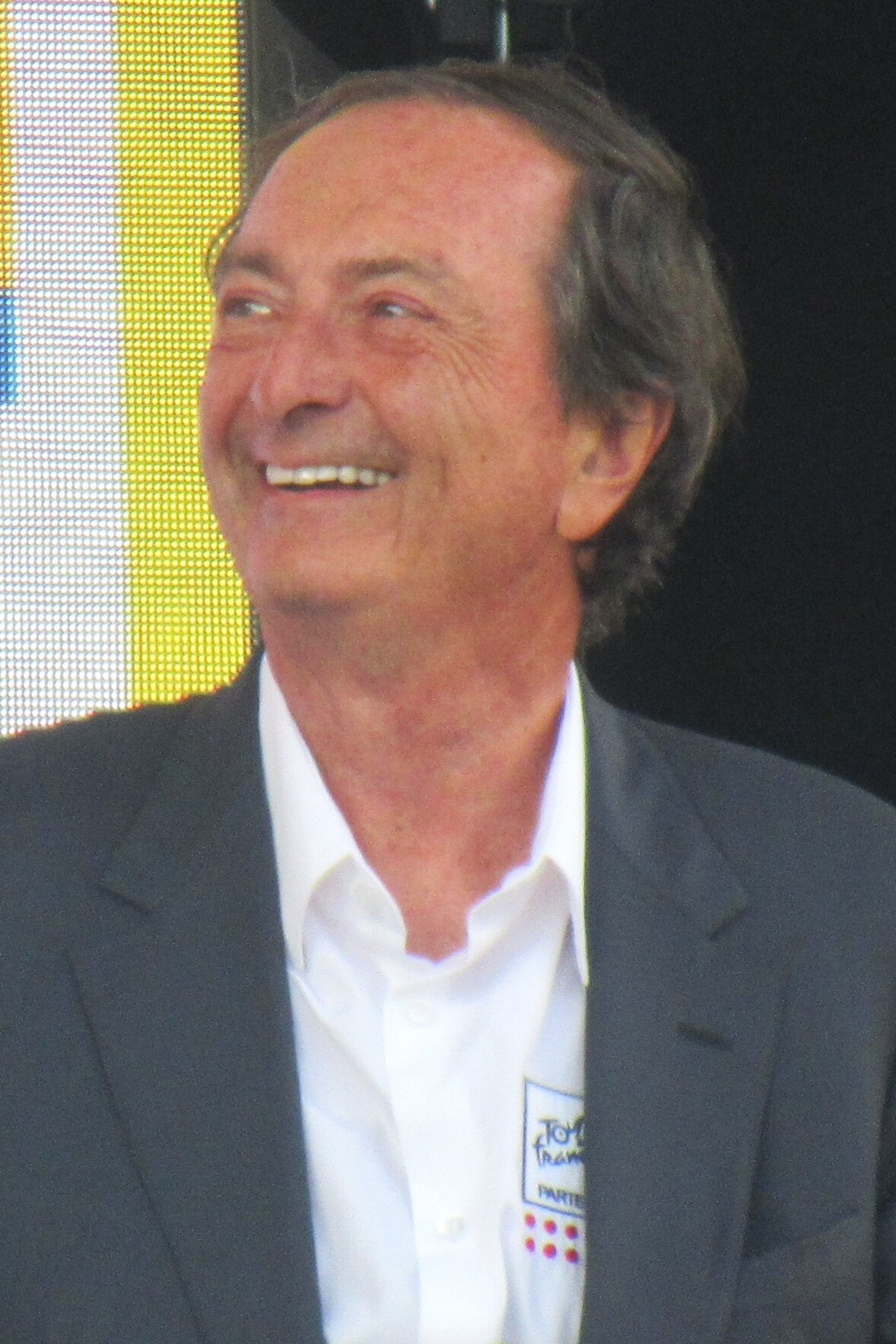
Leclerc at the Tour de France Femmes 2024.

Michel Leclerc, known as Michel-Édouard Leclerc (sometimes abbreviated MEL) is a French business executive, known for leading the French supermarket conglomerate E.Leclerc. In this capacity, Leclerc leads a group of entrepreneurs working under the banner of E.Leclerc and represents them in dealings with public officials and appearances to the media.

Leclerc has also served as president of the Hélène and Édouard Leclerc Fund for Culture since 2011, president of the publishing house MEL Publisher since 2013, president of the NEOMA Business School since 2018, and admin for the Institute for Strategic and International Relations since 2023.

== Biography ==
=== Early life and education ===
Michel-Édouard Leclerc was born May 23, 1952 in Landerneau, Brittany to Hélène and Édouard Leclerc. As a boy, Leclerc witnessed the beginnings of the distribution center where his parents sought to develop an original sales formula.

At 11 years old, Leclerc left home to complete his secondary education, as his father had, at the small seminary Sacré-Cœur de Viry-Châtillon. In 1970, after receiving an A3 literary baccalaureate, he enrolled as an economics student at the University of Brest. Finding that he was not gifted in mathematics, he quit university and became a member of the Unified Socialist Party (PSU). A year later, he enrolled at the Paris 1 Panthéon-Sorbonne University. He undertook a doctorate in economics under the tutelage of Raymond Barre, defending his thesis, Le financement du déficit extérieur de la France après la crise pétroliere de 1973 (Financing the foreign trade deficit of France after the 1973 oil crisis), in 1978. He is also the recipient of a masters in philosophy, as well as a masters in political science.

=== Beginnings of the Leclerc supermarket chain (1979-1987) ===
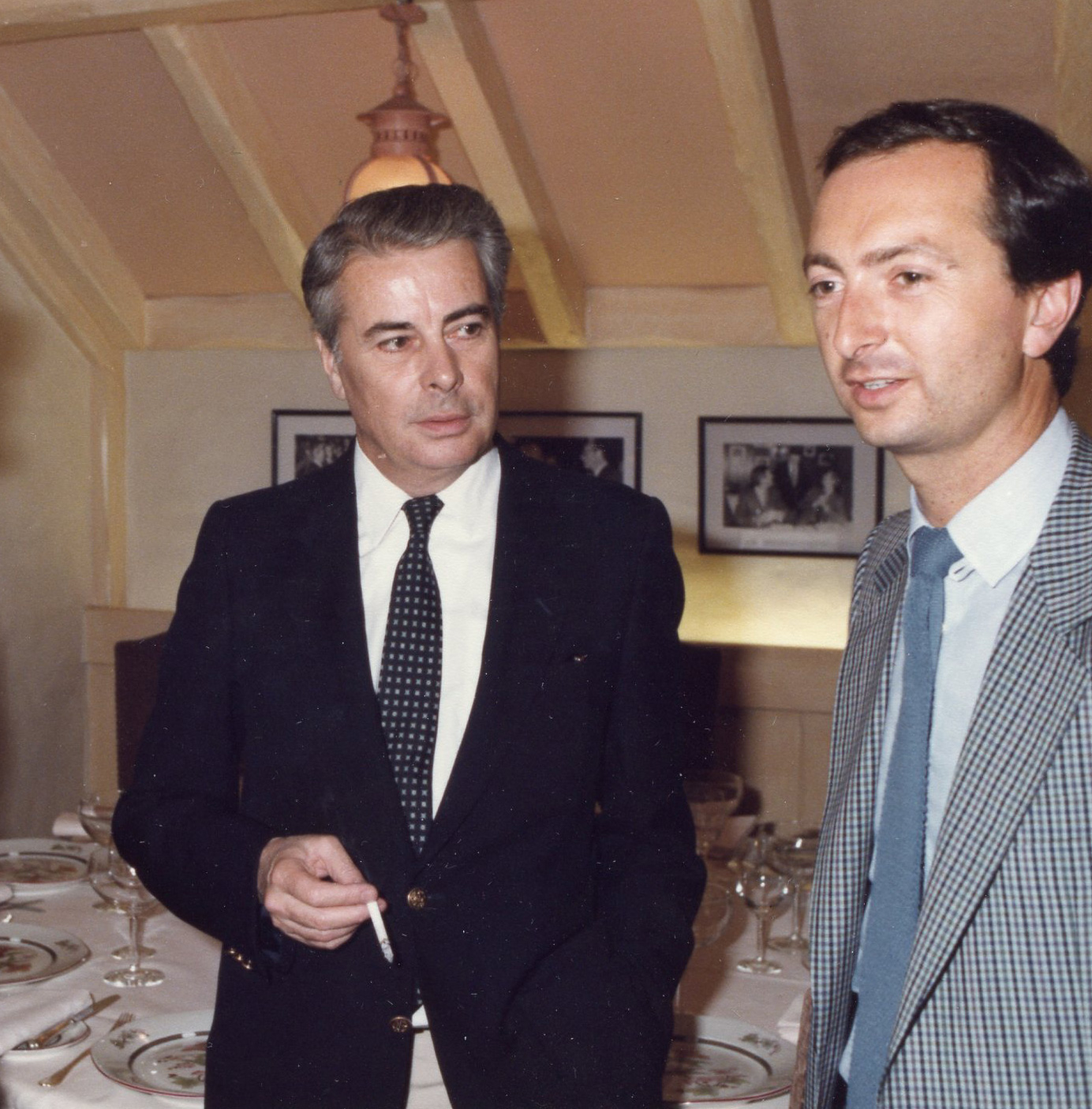
Undated photo of Maurice Roy and Michel Leclerc (l-r).

In 1979, Leclerc accepted the offer of André Jaud (Associate and right-hand man of his father Édouard) to develop an import company–which would later become the Société d’Importation Pétrolière Leclerc (SIPLEC–in order to provide an independent fuel supply for Leclerc supermarkets. On May 7, 1979, he was named interim technical advisor of the organization.

=== Co-presidency and presidency of ACDLec (1988-2019) ===
In 1988, Leclerc was elected co-president of l'Association des centres distributeurs Leclerc (l'ACDLec). alongside his father. The same year, he criticized the activities of municipalities vis-á-vis the establishment of large retail chains, and addressed a government commission concerning the matter.

Leclerc has continued the fight to gain access to protected sectors through legal channels, as communicated in company statements.

In 1996, E.Leclerc stores were the first to replace single-use plastics with recyclable, multi-purpose bags. The brand marketed its commitment to the environment by organizing an annual nationwide litter removal effort under the name "Nettoyons la Nature", which began in 1998. Cash Investigation has revealed that the t-shirts used in the campaign were produced in Bangladesh using child labour. Since then, the brand has continued its push to engage in environmentally conscious efforts, including the design of new stores under Haute qualité environnementale (High-quality environmental standard) protocols, participation in The Forest Trust (TFT) program, which certifies the sourcing of timber supplies, since 2004, and sourcing of supplies from producers engaged in sustainable development practices. In 2005, E.Leclerc stores became the top seller of fair-trade goods in France.

Leclerc succeeded his father Édouard as president of ACDLec in 2006.

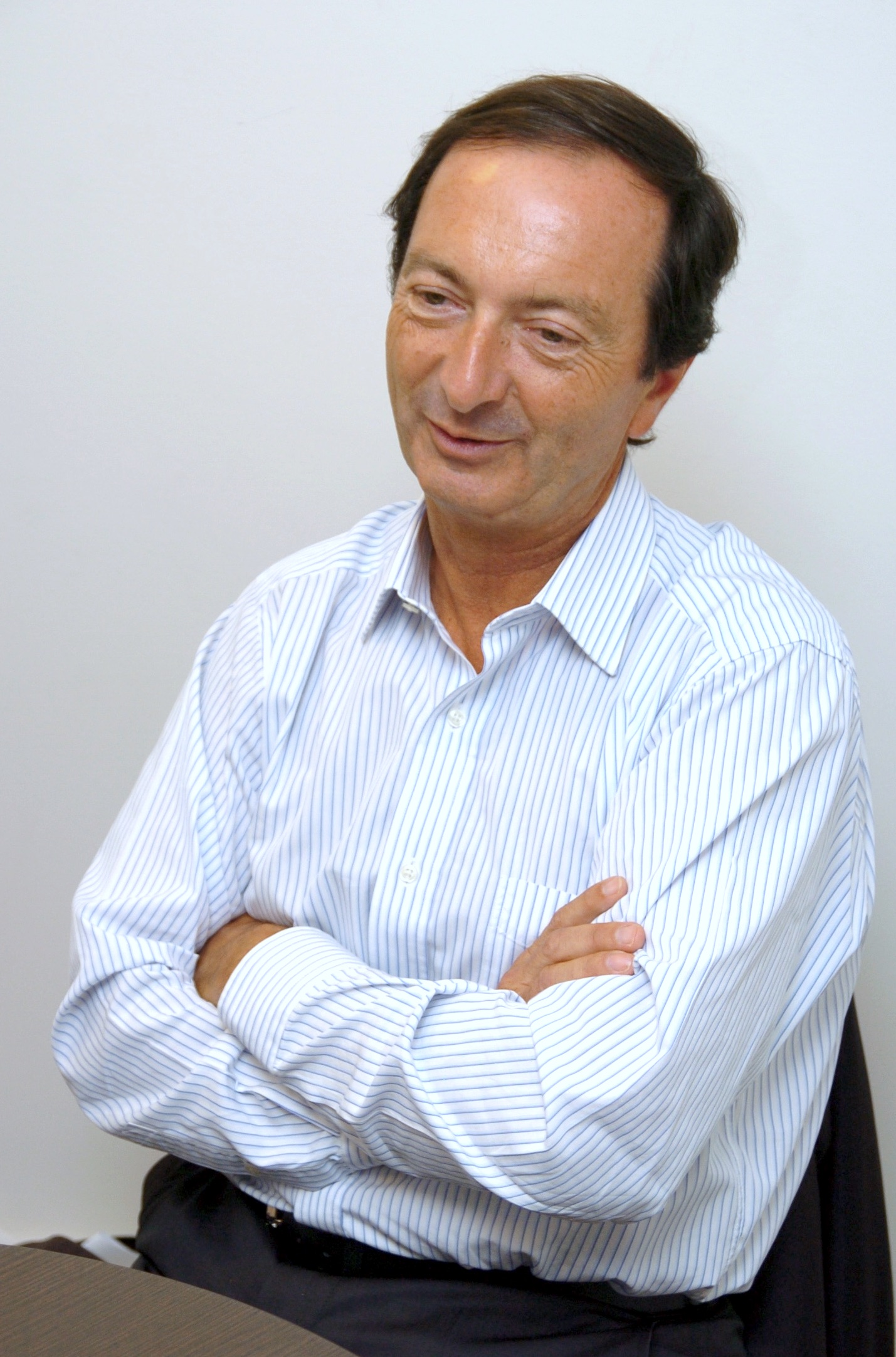
Leclerc in Paris, 2007.

Leclerc has been recognized for his participation in roughly 60 cultural festivals. From 1990 to 2007, he was noted for having sponsored the Angoulême International Comics Festival, La Folle Journée classical music festival in Nantes, the Étonnants voyageurs literary festival in Saint-Malo (also known as the festival des Vieilles Charrues, the Montauban Festival de chansons vivantes, and for creating the Landerneau prize in 2008, and the Hélène and Édouard Leclerc Fund for Culture (a temporary exhibition of contemporary art) in 2012. In 2012, under his leadership, Espaces Culturels (cultural venues) E.Leclerc became the second largest distributor of cultural products in France (the top comic book seller, second-largest bookstore, and third-largest disc seller). This has generated accusations of cultural commodification in the manner of companies such as Fnac, Amazon, and Lagardère (a subsidiary of the Virgin Group). Leclerc has established himself as a fearsome orator opposite public officials; his detractors have described him critically, with Luc Le Vailliant of Libération characterizing him as a "jésuite médiatique surcoté, fasciné par les feux de la rampe, impitoyable derrière son abord agréable" (an overhyped media-savvy Jesuit, enamored by the limelight, merciless beneath a pleasant demeanor).

In May 2021, he was named "Top French Boss" according to a ranking by Forbes Magazine.

=== Personal life ===
Leclerc is a comic fan, and a collector of comic strips. He is an amateur sailor, and has rounded Cape Horn several times.

Leclerc began his second marriage to Natalia Olzoeva of Ufa, Russia, in 1987. He is the father of four children from his first marriage.

== Decorations ==
- Chevalier de la Légion d'honneur (Awarded March 29, 2002)

== Bibliography ==
- Leclerc, Michel-Édouard (1994). La Fronde des caddies. éditions Plon. p. 267. ISBN 2-259-00240-4.
- Leclerc, Michel-Édouard; Wahl, Chantal-Marie (2003). Itinéraires dans l'univers de la bande dessinée. Flammarion. ISBN 978-2-08-068452-3.
- Leclerc, Michel-Édouard; Le Bourdonnec, Yannick (2004). Du bruit dans le Landerneau. éditions Albin Michel. p. 312. ISBN 2226392785.
- Leclerc, Michel-Édouard; Vial, Nicolas (2009). La planète n'est pas à vendre. éditions Naïve.
- Leclerc, Michel-Édouard; Tuaillon, Alexandre (2021). Les Essentiels de la République. éditions de l'Observatoire. p. 221. ISBN 979-10-329-2026-8.
