= Le Relais des Mousquetaires =

- Type: Public
- Industry: Retail
- Founded: 1989
- Products: Convenience Stores
- Parent: Les Mousquetaires Group
- Website: Website

Le Relais des Mousquetaires are rural convenience stores, founded in 1989. Their key principal is to "bring life back to the villages and combat the rural exodus" and offer basic products that are needed in these small isolated villages. According to the website, 'Le Relais des Mousquetaires is a store which meets a requirement: to perform the role of the village grocery so that people who have chosen to live in even the most isolated villages can find supplies close at hand and at the best prices.'

== History ==
The first Relais mini-store was set up in 1989 on the island of L’île-aux-Moines to assist the weekly boat. With a small sales area, these mini-stores offer basic essential foodstuffs. Some mini-stores offer additional products and services such as bread, toys, magazines and papers, gas bottles, photographic services, etc.
