= Vêti =

French clothing shop

- Type: Public
- Industry: Retail
- Founded: 1979
- Products: Clothing
- Parent: Les Mousquetaires Group
- Website: Vêti Website (in French)

Vêti (sometimes referred to as 'Vetimarché', short for vêtements (clothing)) is a French clothing shop, offering clothes for the family with over 150 retail outlets in France. Vêti has its own brands, nine in all, as well as national brands such as Levi's, Lee Cooper and Ober at low prices.

Vêti signed a partnership with former Miss France 2001 Élodie Gossuin in 2006, appointing her as the brand's ambassador and securing exclusive distribution of her clothing collection, "Elodie Gossuin by Vêti.

== History ==
In 1986, Les Mousquetaires created the Vêtimarché brand, with its first outlet in Vannes, in a move to sell clothing for the whole family. With a concept relatively similar to that of supermarkets, this led to the group's failure. The company's beginnings were difficult due to a lack of professionalism, but a change of mentality and a cultural revolution enabled the group to improve its textile business, leading to a major restructuring of the company's network in the early 2000s.

In 1996, the chain had almost 120 outlets, and in 1997 had a 4.3% market share in specialized textile superstores (source: TNS Secodip, 1997 results), while Kiabi had a 26.3% share. The chain generated sales of FRF 1.02 billion in 1997, compared with FRF 868.4 million in 1996, or FRF 8.8 million per store. On August 25, 1998, the Pocé-sur-Cisse store tested a new concept focusing on the sale of both own-brand and leading brands, as well as sporting goods and equipment.
