= Mousquetaires Group =

French multinational retailer

- Native name: Groupement Mousquetaires
- Type: Private
- Industry: Retail
- Founded: 1969; 57 years ago
- Founder: Jean-Pierre Le Roch
- Headquarters: Bondoufle, France
- Area served: Europe
- Revenue: ▲45.3 Billion € (2019)
- Number of employees: 112,000
- Divisions: Intermarché; Écomarché; Netto; Interex; Bricomarché; Roady; Restaumarché; Vêti; Le Relais des Mousquetaires
- Website: www.mousquetaires.com

The Mousquetaires Group (French: Groupement Mousquetaires), formerly Les Mousquetaires, trading as Grupo Mosqueteiros in Portugal and as Grupa Muszkieterów in Poland, is a French retail group operating internationally, founded in 1969. Its head office is in Bondoufle, France.

It operates several different brands for different retail segments, which are mostly suffixed by the term "marché" (French for market), like Intermarché or Bricomarché. The stores are independent businesses, but they are supplied with products and central services by Les Mousquetaires group.

The Mousquetaires Group operates in:

- France (4,100 hypermarkets and supermarkets),
- Belgium (159 Intermarché Super supermarkets and Intermarché Contact convenience stores),
- Portugal (367 Intermarché supermarkets and Bricomarché stores),
- Poland (398 Intermarché supermarkets and Bricomarché stores),
- and more than 50 affiliated “Partner” stores in Réunion, Martinique, French Guiana, Guadeloupe, Mayotte, Cameroon, the Republic of the Congo, Gabon, Mauritius, Madagascar, Lebanon, and Georgia.

== History ==
=== "EX" brand ===
Initially, Jean-Pierre Le Roch, a member of the E.Leclerc retail cooperative, was a close associate of Édouard Leclerc. Although fruitful, the relationship between Édouard Leclerc and Jean-Pierre Le Roch deteriorated due to differences of opinion, with Leclerc moving towards consolidating supermarkets into hypermarkets, while Le Roch wanted to open more supermarkets. Their collaboration ended on 15 September 1969, when Jean-Pierre Le Roch resigned from the cooperative following yet another disagreement, taking with him, by ultimatum, ninety-two members at the time, or more than half, and forming a new cooperative called EX - Office de Distribution (EX implying ex-Leclerc), of which Le Roch was appointed president.

=== Intermarché ===
In 1973, the oil company Exxon (known outside the United States under the Esso brand) established itself in France and registered the trademark “Ex” to avoid confusion, asking companies with the prefix “ex-” to change it. Following the example of other brands such as Euromarché, EX chose to rename itself Intermarché.

On 9 June 2009, the Les Mousquetaires group announced that the Intermarché brand would be rolled out across all of its traditional food stores, with the exception of Netto (France), which sells low-cost products.

Intermarché stores are categorized according to their sales area and location:

- Intermarché Hyper for the largest stores;
- Intermarché Super for most Intermarché stores;
- Intermarché Express for stores located in city centers, replacing some Écomarché stores;
- Intermarché Contact to replace the former Écomarché stores and Les Mousquetaires outlets in rural areas.
