= Bricomarché =

French multinational home improvement store chain

- Company type: Public
- Industry: Retail
- Founded: 1979
- Products: DIY
- Parent: Les Mousquetaires Group
- Website: Bricomarché Website (French only)

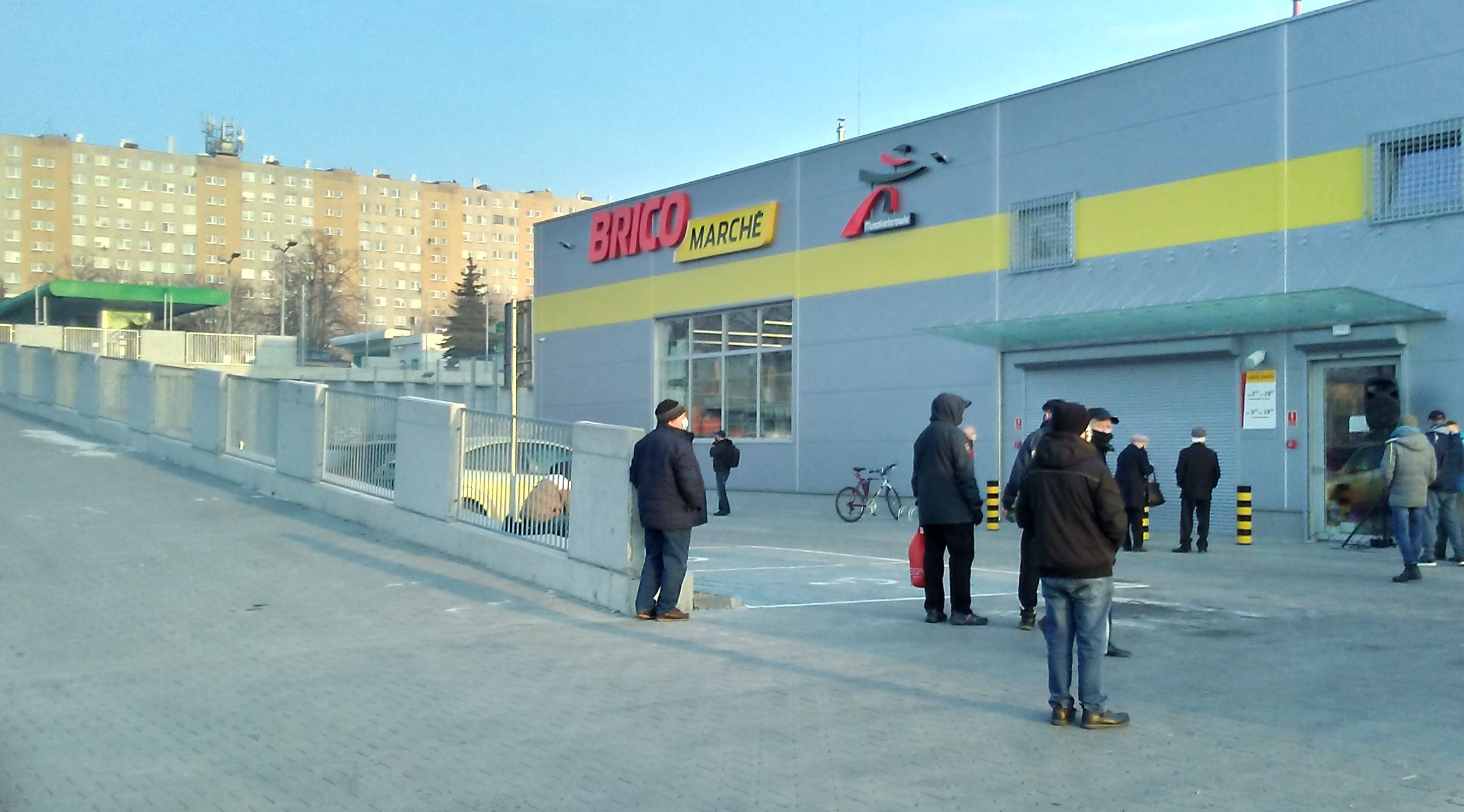
Bricomarché in Tomaszów Mazowiecki, Poland

Bricomarché offer decorating, DIY, materials, gardening and pet products lines. Founded in 1979, and operating 500 stores in 3 countries (Poland, Portugal and France), each store's sales area is between 1,500 and 2,300 m^{2}, and have three basic principles:

- Proximity to customers
- Low Prices
- Every thing sold under one roof

Before the re-brand in 2008, other stores called 'Logimarché' offered DIY sales in rural areas, selling DIY, decorating and gardening products. The Logimarché chain was formed in 1998 and operated 60 stores in France. The stores have a total sales area of 540 m^{2}. In October 2008, Logimarché was replaced with the Bricomarché brand.
