= Poivre Rouge =

French restaurant chain

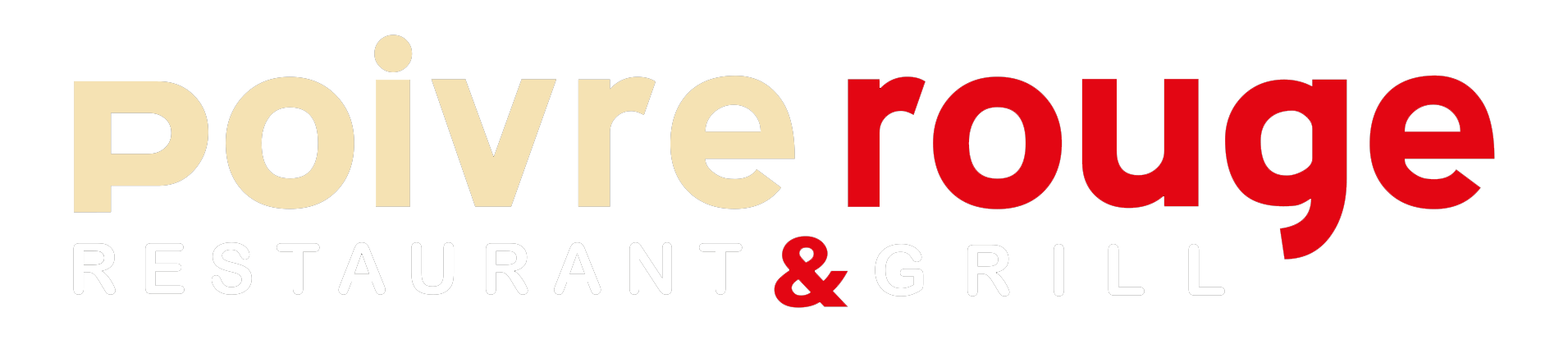
- Industry: Restaurants
- Founded: 1983 (as a company)
- Headquarters: Saint-Barthélemy-d'Anjou, France
- Parent: La Boucherie Group
- Website: www.poivre-rouge.com

Poivre Rouge (lit. '"Red Pepper"' in French) is a chain of restaurants in France owned by La Boucherie Group. Most locations are found in retail parks of the Les Mousquetaires, known as Les Marchés des Mousquetaires. Poivre Rouge was founded as Restaumarché in 1980 by Les Mousquetaires.

In 2005 it served 4.2 million meals.

In 2014 it was the sixth largest restaurant chain in France with 82 restaurants.

In July 2019, the La Boucherie group announced the acquisition of Poivre Rouge, which was completed in September 2019.
