= Gérard Fromanger =

French painter (1939–2021)

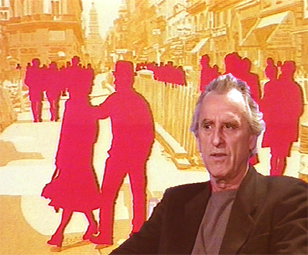
- Gérard Fromanger in 1995
- Born: 6 September 1939; Jouars-Pontchartrain, Yvelines
- Died: 18 June 2021 (aged 81); Paris
- Education: École des Beaux-Arts
- Occupation: Painter

Gérard Fromanger (6 September 1939 – 18 June 2021) was a French visual artist.

== Works ==
A painter who also employed collage, sculpture, photography, cinema, and lithography, he was associated with the French artistic movement of the 1960s and 1970s, called Figuration Narrative (new figurative representation), somewhat like pop art. Fromanger was also associated with photorealism.

Fromanger studied at the École des Beaux-Arts in Paris, where his first solo exhibition was held in 1966. Souffles, his large translucent "half-balloon" street sculptures, attracted attention in 1968. He also collaborated with Jean-Luc Godard to make the short "Film-tract 1968". His work represents themes of urban life and consumer society.

The Nouvelle Figuration movement (sometimes called figuration narrative or représentation narrative) is considered to have been a reaction against abstract art, with a more political slant than American pop art. Fromanger has been described as a social critic who takes a political position without neglecting the poetic dimension.

Michel Foucault, a friend of Fromanger's, wrote about his work in Photogenic Painting.

In 2005, a retrospective exhibition, Gérard Fromanger: rétrospective 1962–2005, was shown at various galleries in France, Belgium, Luxembourg, and Switzerland. Fromanger lived and worked in both Siena and Paris.

== Books ==
- Bernard Ceysson Gérard Fromanger (Catalogue for retrospective exhibition 2005)
- Gilles Deleuze and Michel Foucault Photogenic Painting (2000)
- Alain Jouffroy Gérard Fromanger (1973)
- Serge July Fromanger (2000)
