= Veti, Dahanu =

Village in Maharashtra

Veti
- village
- Location in Maharashtra, India Veti (India)
- Coordinates: 19.9059519°N 72.9755829°E
- Country: India
- State: Maharashtra
- District: Palghar
- Taluka: Dahanu
- Elevation: 58 m (190 ft)

Population (2011)
  - Total: 2,796
- Time zone: UTC+5:30 (IST)
- 2011 census code: 551746

Veti is a village in the Palghar district of Maharashtra, India. It is located in the Dahanu taluka.

== Demographics ==
According to the 2011 census of India, Veti has 520 households. The effective literacy rate (i.e. the literacy rate of population excluding children aged 6 and below) is 47.23%.

Demographics (2011 Census)
	Total	Male	Female
Population	2796	1350	1446
Children aged below 6 years	486	252	234
Scheduled caste	10	7	3
Scheduled tribe	2667	1285	1382
Literates	1091	657	434
Workers (all)	1377	710	667
Main workers (total)	986	645	341
Main workers: Cultivators	586	384	202
Main workers: Agricultural labourers	295	177	118
Main workers: Household industry workers	4	4	0
Main workers: Other	101	80	21
Marginal workers (total)	391	65	326
Marginal workers: Cultivators	238	29	209
Marginal workers: Agricultural labourers	123	18	105
Marginal workers: Household industry workers	17	9	8
Marginal workers: Others	13	9	4
Non-workers	1419	640	779
