= NaturéO =

French supermarket chain

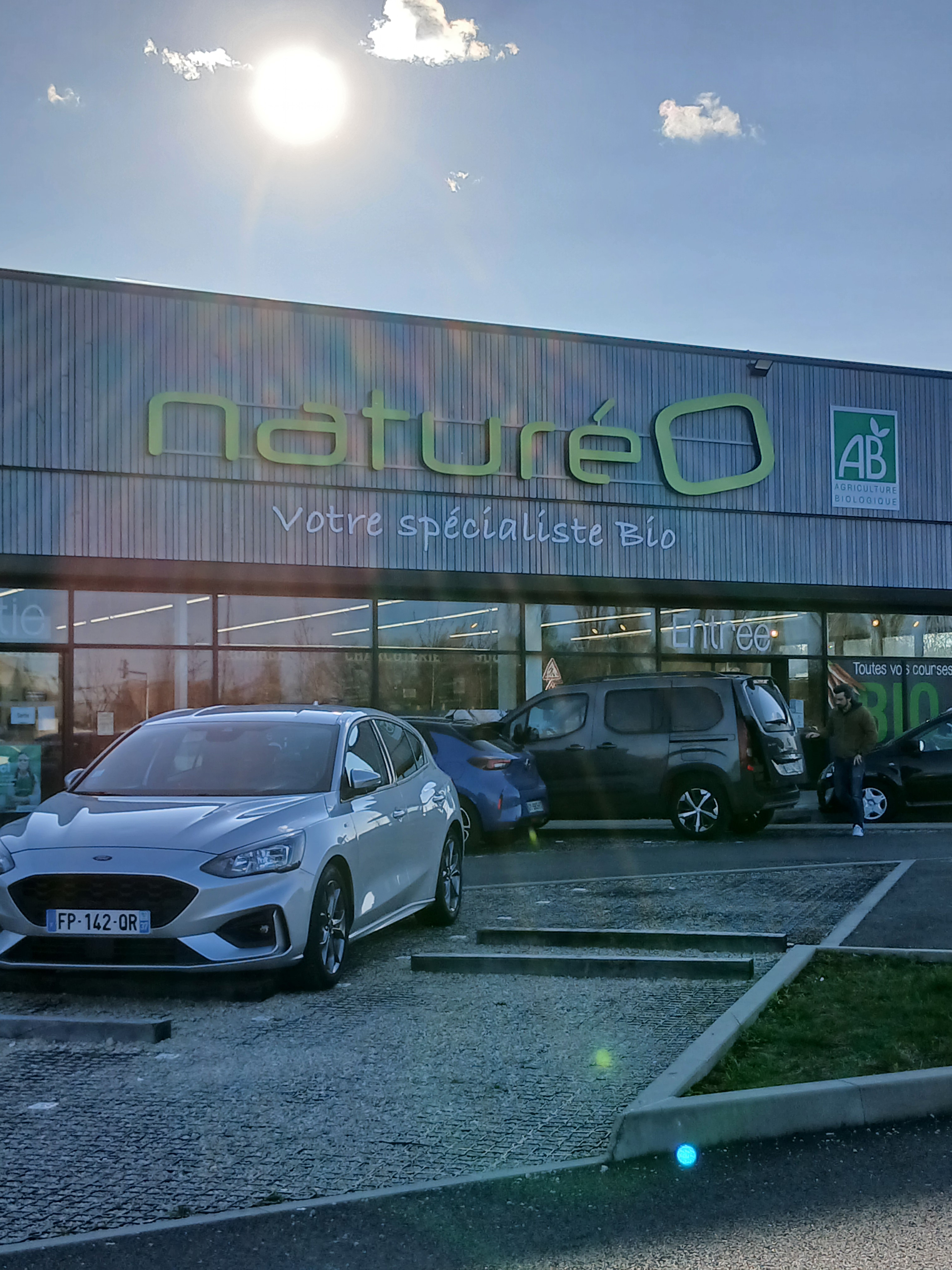
Branch

naturéO is a small chain of supermarkets in France carrying natural and organic products.

== History ==
=== 2007: Chartres, Ballainvilliers and Corbeil ===
In 2007, Xavier Travers opened the first naturéO store in Chartres. Soon after, Xavier opened new locations in Ballainvilliers and in Corbeil.

=== 2009-2010: Ballainvilliers, Evry, Égly and Rambouillet ===
Having achieved sales of €4 million EUR after 18 months of operation, Xavier opened four new sites in the Paris region between 2009 and 2010.

=== 2011: Fresnes, Le Mans, Orgeval, Mondeville, Cormontreuil ===
naturéO Le Mans opened in June, 2011.

naturéO Fresnes opened on May 18, 2011.
