= Yves Galland =

French politician and businessman (1941–2025)

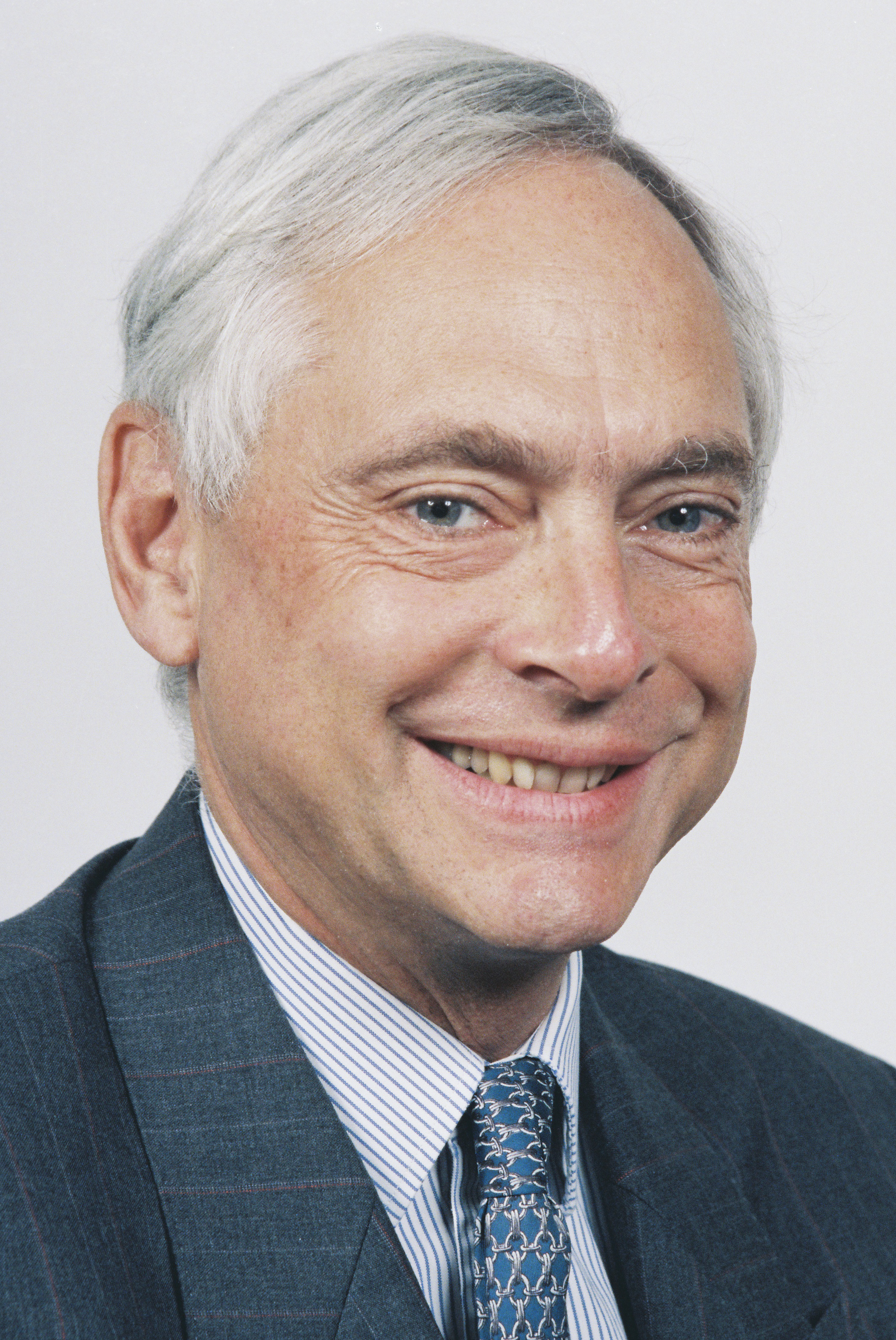
- Born: 8 March 1941; Paris, France
- Died: 13 July 2025 (aged 84)
- Occupations: Businessman; executive

Yves Galland (French: [iv galɑ̃]; 8 March 1941 – 13 July 2025) was a French politician and businessman.

== Life and career ==
After his studies in law from Paris University, Yves Galland started his career in the world of business before also starting his political career. He became a member of the European Parliament, from 1979 to 1986, and again in 1989 to 1995, where he represented the Union for French Democracy (UDF) and the Radical Party. From 1989 to 1992, Galland was Vice President of the European Parliament under President Egon Klepsch. From 1992 to 1994, he was chairman of the Liberal and Democratic Reformist Group, succeeding Valéry Giscard d'Estaing.

Galland died on 13 July 2025, at the age of 84.
