= Coopérative U =

Supermarket chain in France

- Type: Private
- Industry: Retailing
- Founded: 1894; 132 years ago
- Headquarters: Rungis, France
- Key people: Dominique Schelcher (CEO)
- Products: Food, bazaar, textiles, cultural products, etc.
- Revenue: ▲$19.692 billion (2009)
- Subsidiaries: Super U, Marché U, Super U, Utile
- Website: https://www.magasins-u.com/

Coopérative U (Système U before 2024) is a French symbol group retailers cooperative of independent hypermarkets and supermarkets, headquartered in the Parc Tertiaire SILIC in Rungis, France.

It owns the trademarks Hyper U, Super U, U Express and Utile, which are used by its members.

In January 2025, the group announced that it had 1,804 stores in 15 countries.

== History ==
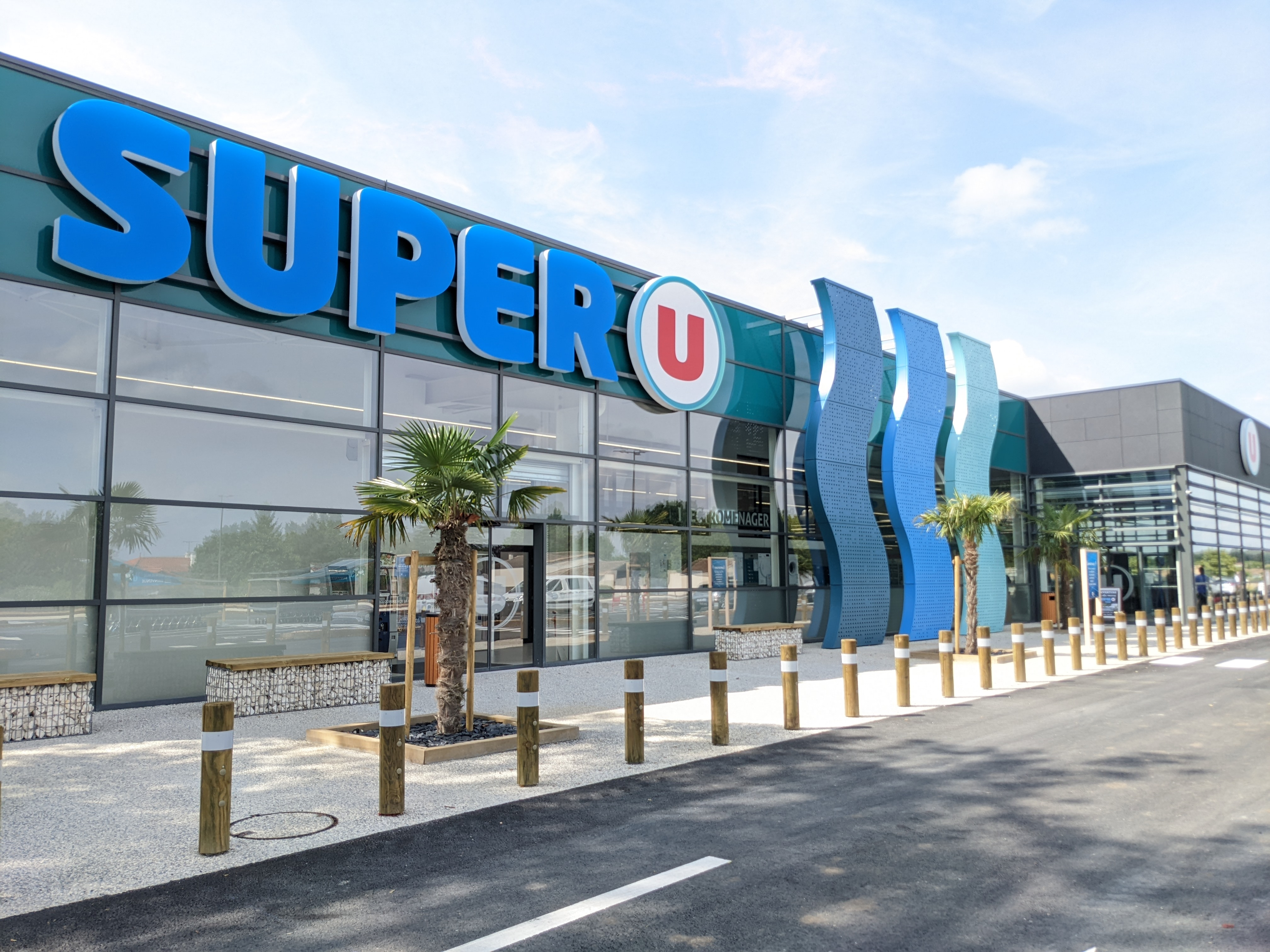
Super U in Cozes, France.

It is directly descended from the Pain Quotidien ('daily bread') cooperative which was founded in western France in 1894. In 1920, the association brought together 300 affiliated grocers.

In 2023, Mercure International of Monaco will begin replacing the Casino and Géant brands with Coopérative U in Congo-Brazzaville, Gabon and Senegal.

In February 2024, the Schiever group becomes a partner of Coopérative U. It announces that it will begin replacing its Auchan hypermarkets with Hyper U and its Bi1 supermarkets with Super U in March 2025.

On May 16, 2024, the group was renamed “Coopérative U”.

In March 2025, the Schiever group started a replacement of its Auchan hypermarkets with Hyper U and its Bi1 supermarkets with Super U or U Express; 183 stores will gradually join the Coopérative U by 2027.

When it published its annual results in February 2025, it announced that it had opened 21 new stores and signed 60 acquisitions from other brands. In June 2025, the group announced 41 opening projects in Africa by 2028, notably via its partner Mercure International of Monaco and the replacement of Casino brands.

== Locations ==
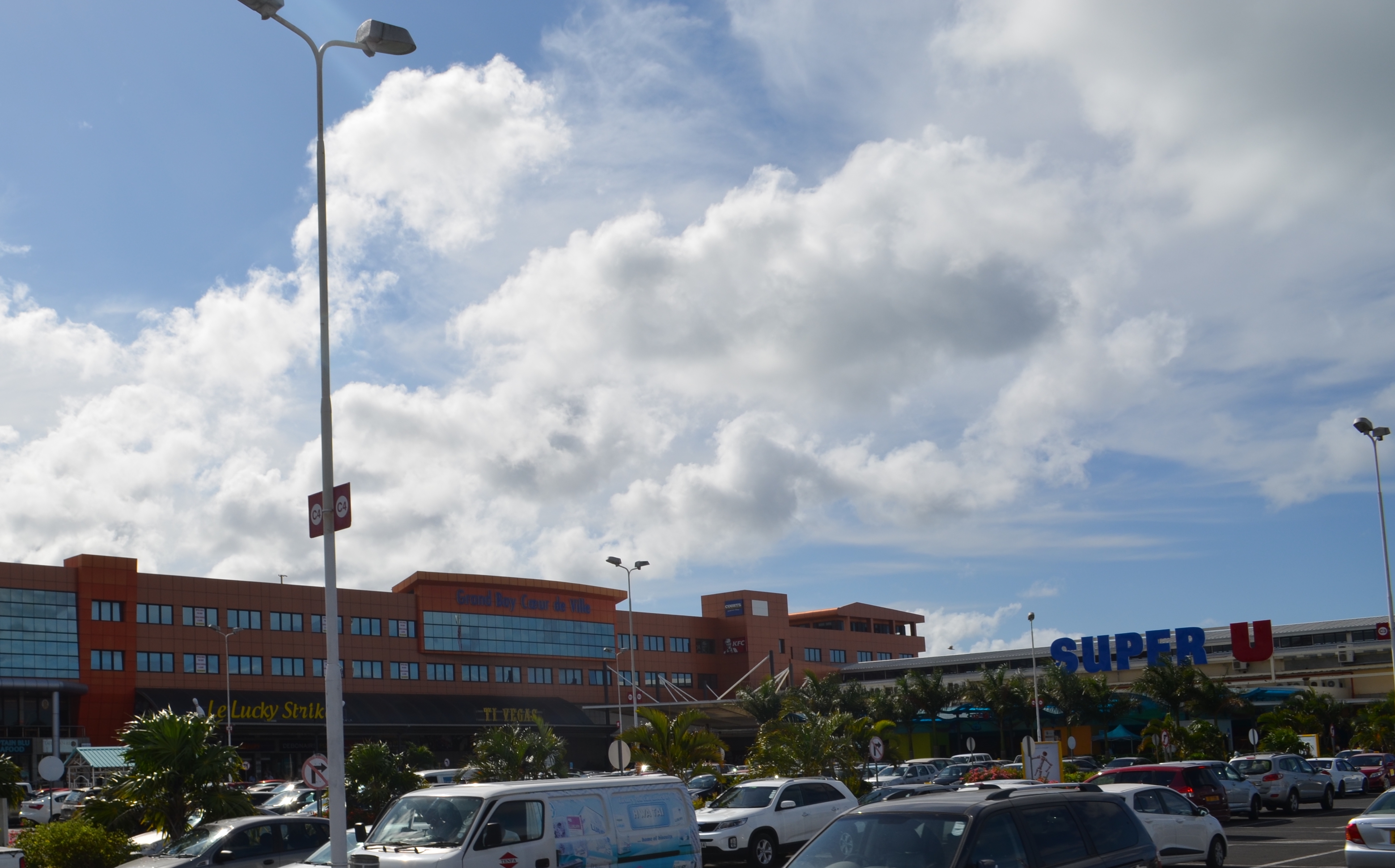
Super U in Grand Baie, Mauritius.

In January 2025, the group announced that it had 1,804 stores in 15 countries.

=== Europe ===
Locations
Year	Country
1894	France
1956	Monaco
2013	Andorra
2024	Switzerland

=== Africa ===
Locations
Year	Country
2000	Mauritius
2012	Benin
2014	Ivory Coast
2015	Cameroon
2017	Senegal
2018	Guinea
2019	Morocco
2022	Madagascar
2022	Burkina Faso
2024	Gabon
2025	Congo-Brazzaville

=== Overseas France ===
==== North America ====
- Saint Pierre and Miquelon

==== Caribbean ====
- Guadeloupe
- Martinique
- Saint Barthélemy
- Collectivity of Saint Martin

==== South America ====
- French Guiana

==== Oceania ====
- New Caledonia
- French Polynesia

==== Africa ====
- Réunion

== The sub-brands ==
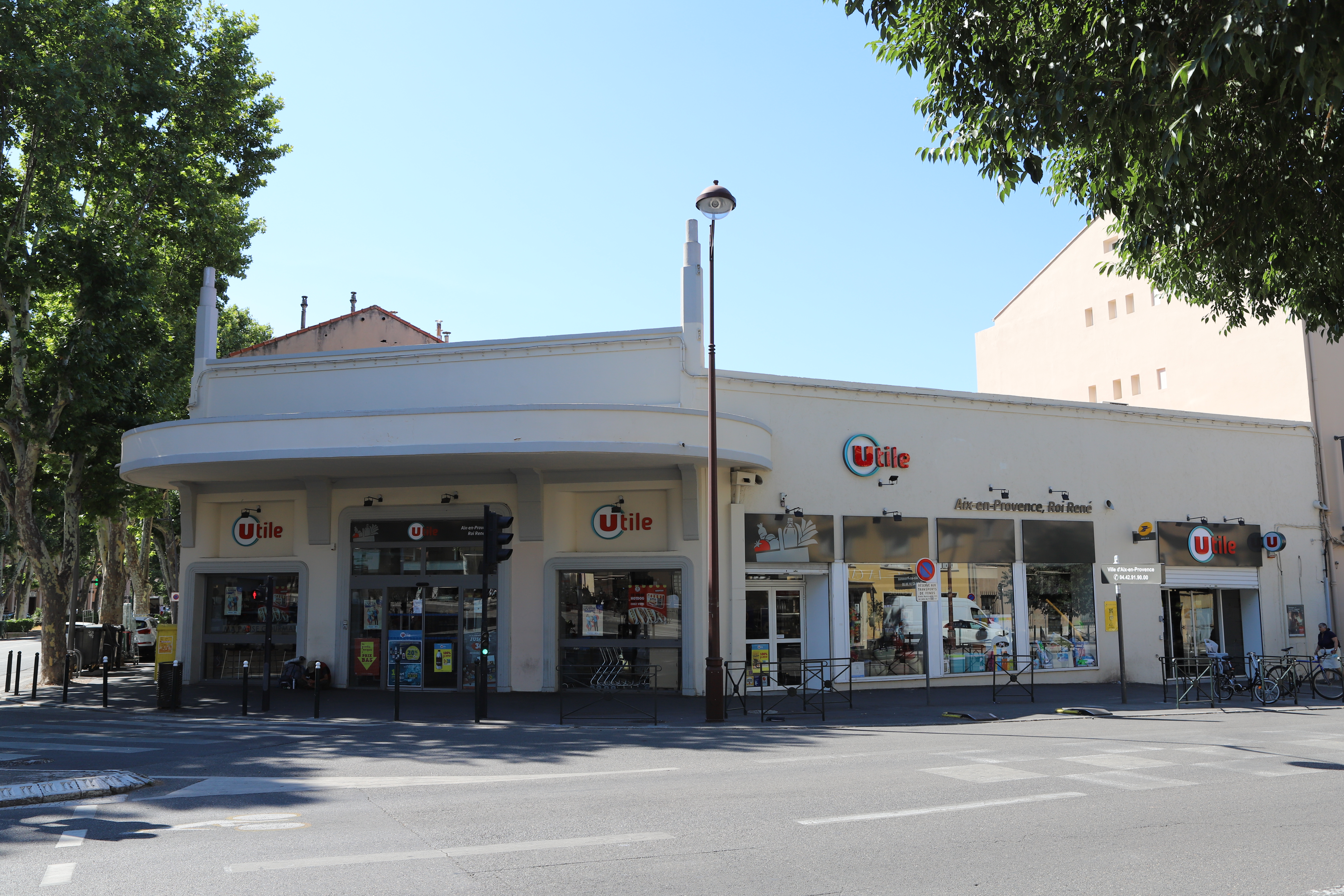
Utile in Aix-en-Provence, France.

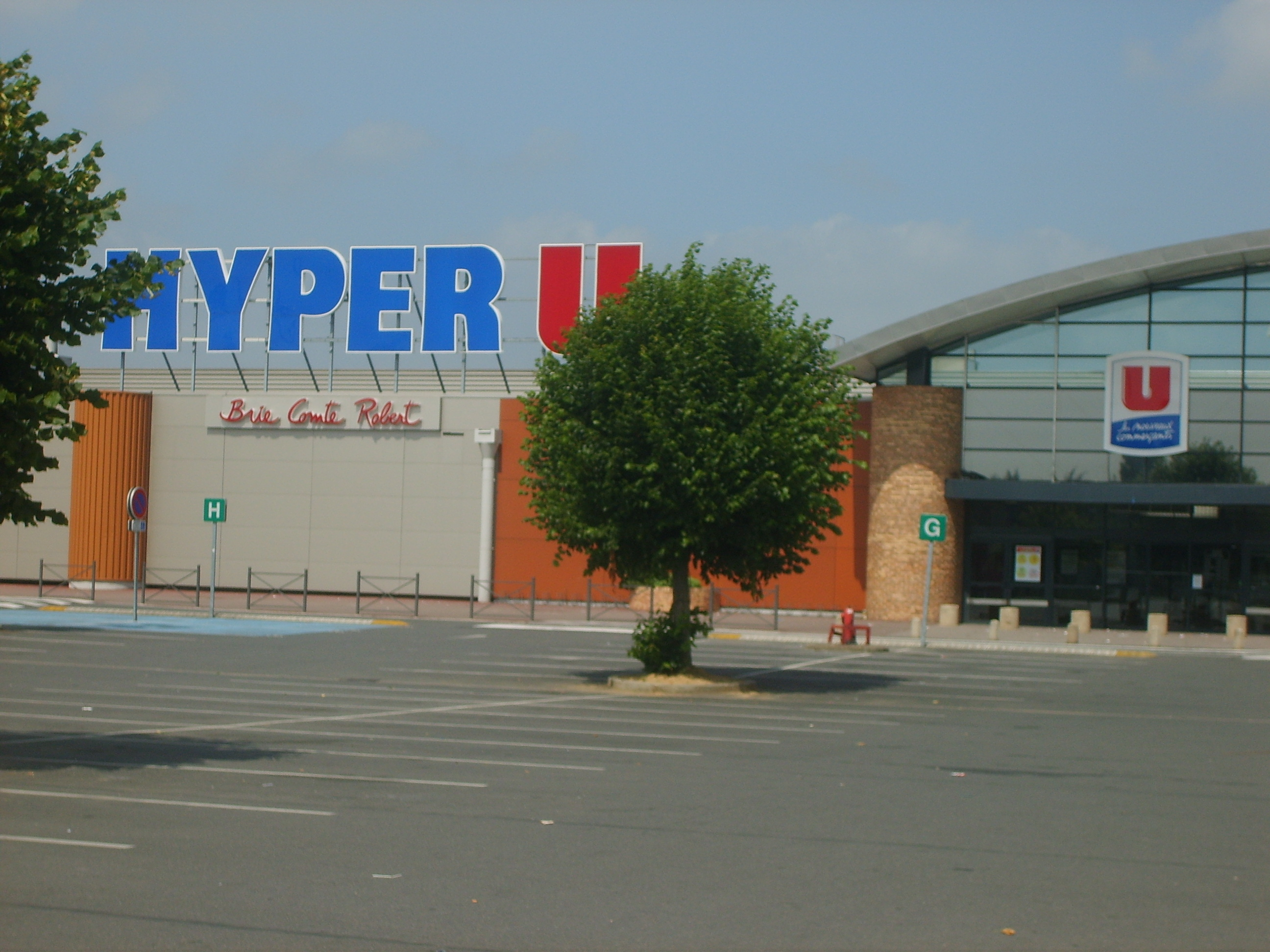
A Hyper U hypermarket in Brie-Comte-Robert, France.

There are four brands found within Coopérative U:

- The largest (in size terms) is the hypermarket Hyper U, which accounts for 15.89% of the group. There are 71 Hyper U stores, which account for a total of 239,293 square metres of retail space (at an average of 4,985 square metres per store). The average spend per trip is €43.60. These are generally found outside larger towns, but normally as stand-alone structures (rather than as part of a shopping centre)
- The next brand down (in terms of size) is Super U which accounts for 79.58% of the group. There are 773 Super U stores, which account for a total of 1,355,004 square metres of retail space (at an average of 2,016 square metres per store). The average spend per trip is €33.30. These are typical supermarkets, and are found either in the centre or on the outskirts of smaller towns. Again they exist as standalone structures.
- Within city centres (and in rural areas), there are smaller stores known as U Express, which account for 4.53% of the group. There are 294 U Express stores, which account for a total of 104,468 square metres of retail space (at an average of 730 square metres per store). The average spend per trip is €17.00.
- Utile are the smallest brand stores in Système U with 410 locations across France. They are usually run as independent convenience stores and so do not accept Système U clubcards. They are found mainly in small towns, village centers and at rest stations (except on dual carriageways and motorways) in rural parts of France.
