= Norma (supermarket) =

German multinational grocery store chain

Norma Warenhandels-GmbH

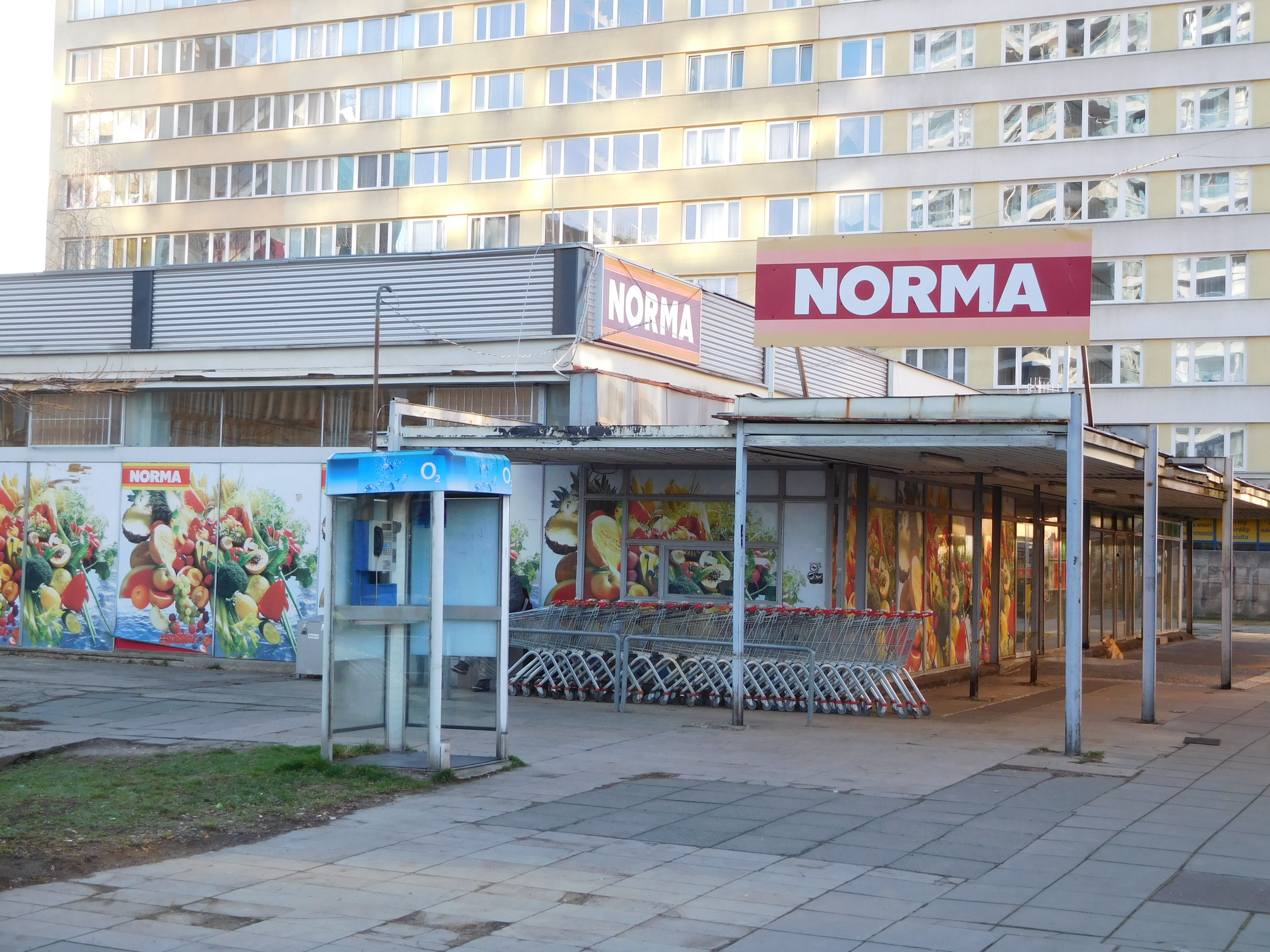
- Norma store in Prague, Czech Republic
- Company type: GmbH
- Industry: Retail (grocery)
- Founded: 1960s
- Headquarters: Fürth, Germany
- Products: Mainly own brand, with a few larger and regional brands
- Revenue: About 6 billion Euro
- Total assets: 914,493,344 euro (2017)
- Number of employees: 14,679 (2017)
- Website: www.norma-online.de

Norma is a food discount store with more than 1,300 stores in Germany, France, the Czech Republic and Austria. The stores are appearing as Norma and Norma-Rodi, as Norma has acquired the company Rodi.

== Company ==
In 1921, the family company George Roth in Fürth, Germany, was founded. Out of this company, in the 1960s, the first Norma store opened in the south of Germany. Since the end of the 1980s, Norma has developed from a regional discount store to an international company. On 5 April 2010 the company owner, Manfred Georg Roth, died. The company is managed by a dual leadership consisting of Gerd Köber and Robert Tjón. In December 2011, the general partner changed its legal form from a GmbH to a foundation based in Fürth. The limited partnership was then renamed Norma Lebensmittelfilialbetrieb Stiftung & Co. KG. Another foundation was set up to manage the real estate holdings.

== Concept ==
In common with other large German discount supermarket chains such as Aldi and Lidl, Norma's central retail concept is to offer a narrow product line of high-turnover foods at low prices.
