= Édouard Leclerc =

French businessman and entrepreneur

- Born: 20 November 1926; Landerneau, Finistère, France
- Died: 17 September 2012 (aged 85); Saint-Divy, Finistère, France
- Occupation: Entrepreneur E.Leclerc

Édouard Leclerc (French pronunciation: [edwaʁ ləklɛʁ]; born 20 November 1926 in Landerneau – died 17 September 2012 in Saint-Divy, Brittany) was a French businessman and entrepreneur who founded the French supermarket chain E.Leclerc in 1948. From his first store, Leclerc's chain has multiplied into more than 550 locations in France and 114 stores outside the country, as of 2012.

Leclerc was born in the commune of Landerneau, Finistère, in the region of Brittany on 20 November 1926. He died in Saint-Divy, Finistère, on 17 September 2012, at the age of 85.

== Family ==
In 1950, he married Hélène Diquélou and had three children: Michel-Édouard Leclerc, who currently runs his business; Isabelle; and Hélène married to François Levieux.
