= Intermarché =

French multinational supermarket chain

- Type: Public
- Industry: Retail
- Founded: 1969; 57 years ago
- Headquarters: Bondoufle, France
- Area served: France, Belgium, Portugal, Poland, Monaco
- Key people: Thierry Cotillard (CEO)
- Services: Hypermarket, supermarket, grocery store
- Revenue: ▲€ 44.5 billion (2024)
- Number of employees: 140,000 (2024)
- Parent: Mousquetaires Group
- Subsidiaries: Intermarché Hyper; Intermarché Super; Intermarché Contact; Intermarché Express; Netto; Partenaire Intermarché
- Website: intermarche.com.

Intermarché (English translation: Intermarket) is a French brand of general commercial hypermarkets, supermarkets and convenience stores owned by retail group Mousquetaires. It mainly operates in France, French-speaking Belgium, Poland and Portugal. In 2024, Intermarché was the third-largest retailer in France by market share, behind E.Leclerc and Carrefour.

In 2024, Intermarché had 2,496 stores in 5 countries. Partenaire Intermarché had 60 stores in Overseas France and in 7 countries.

== History ==
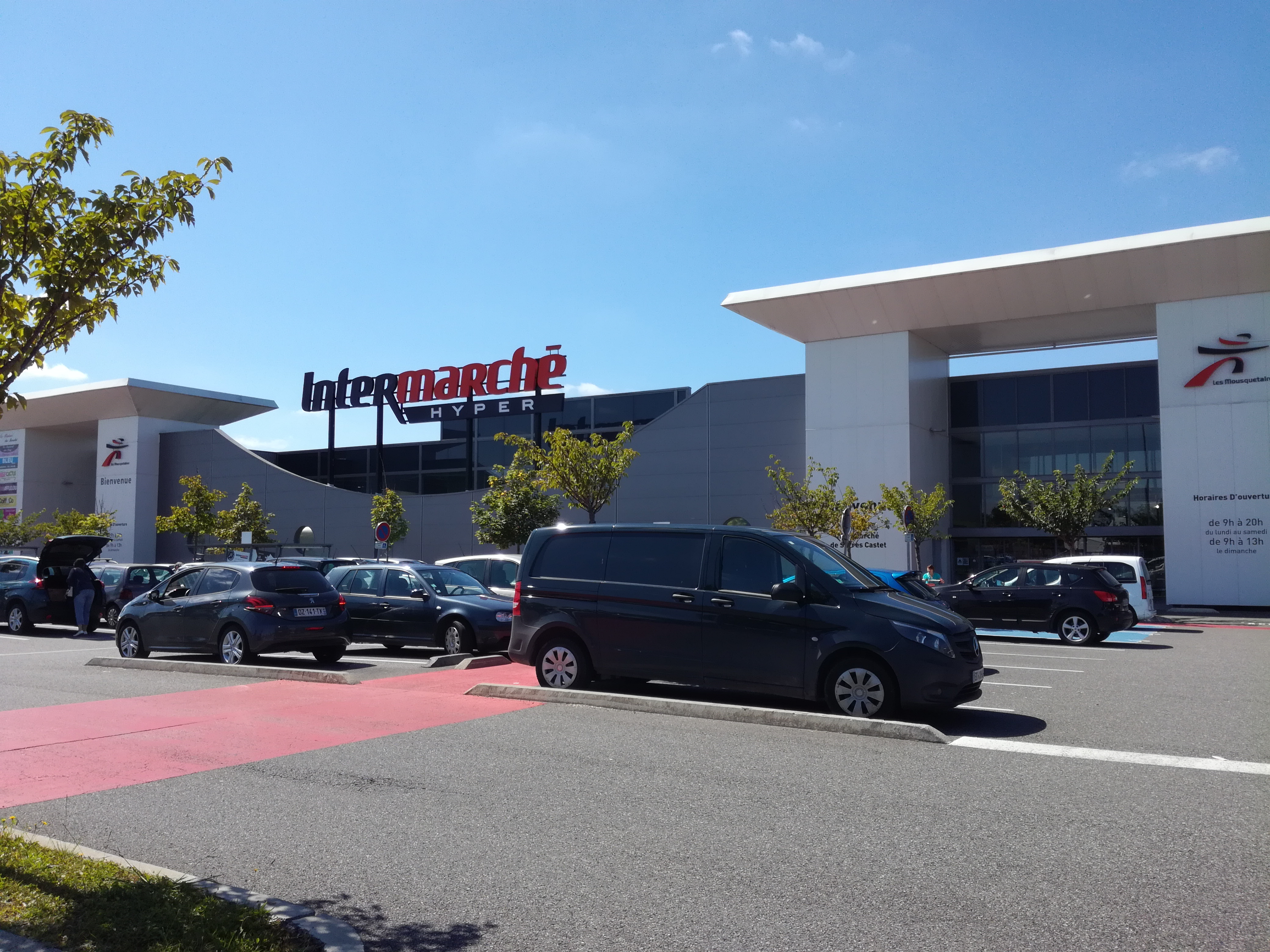
Intermarché Hyper in Serres-Castet, France

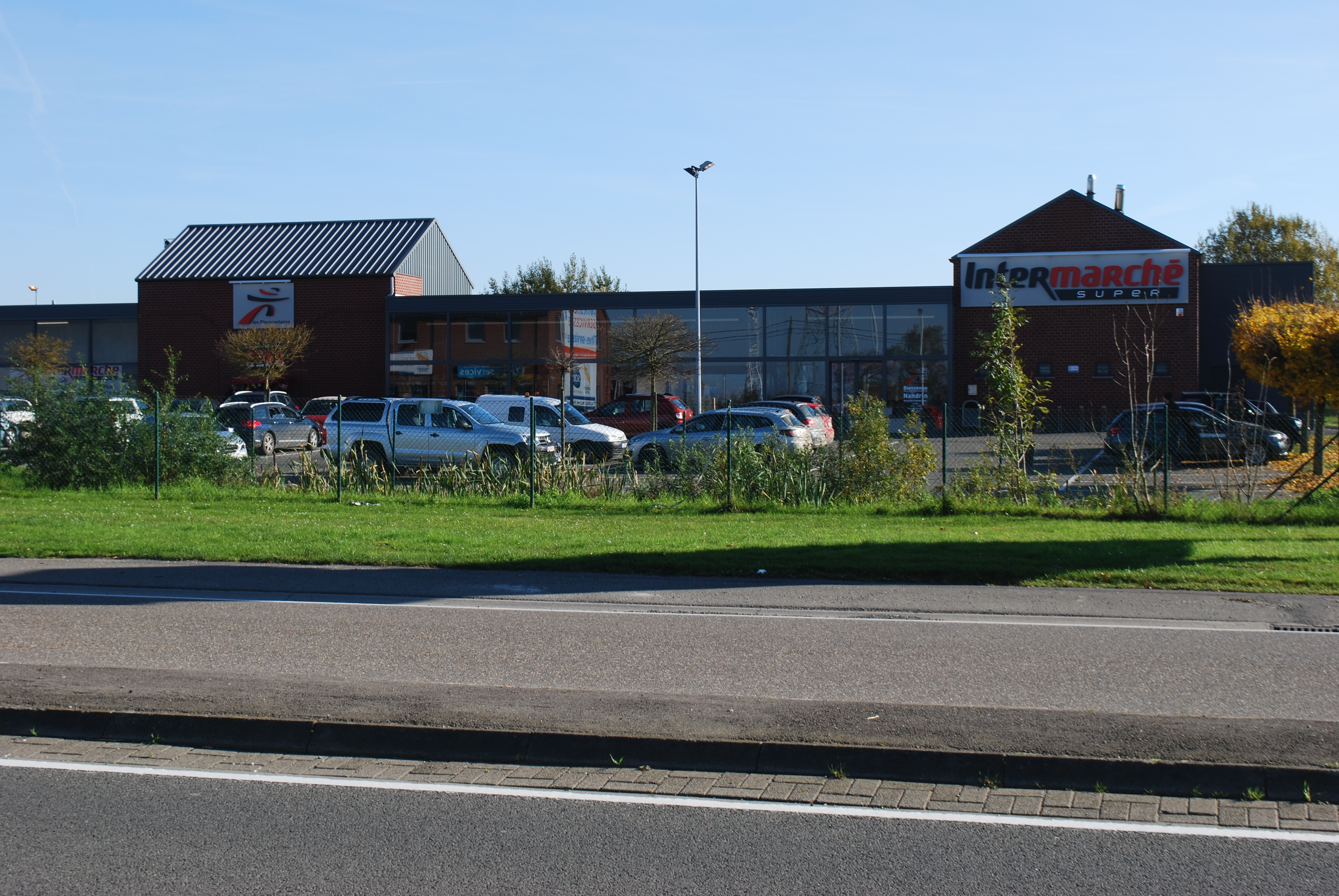
Intermarché Super in Nandrin, Belgium

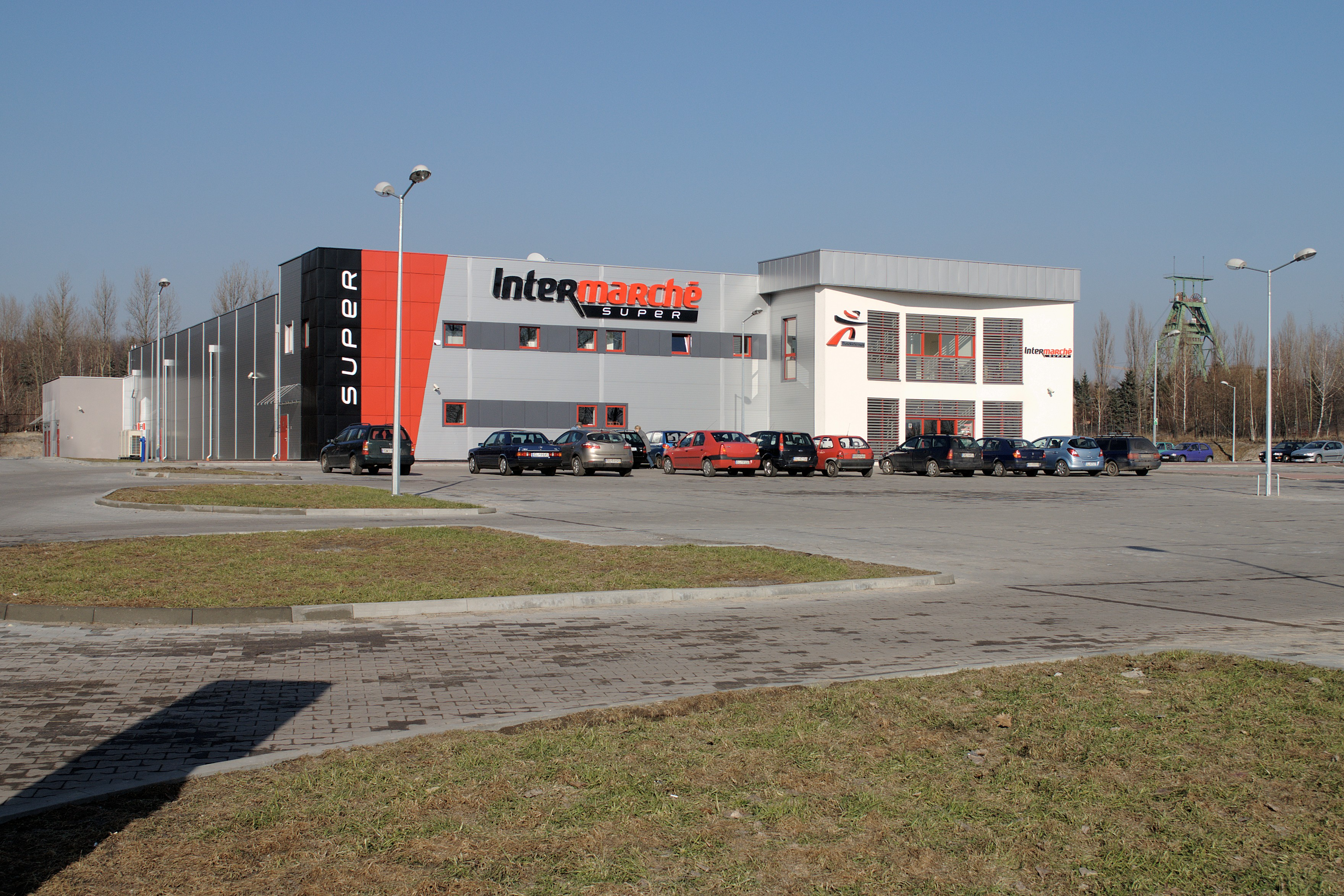
Intermarché Super in Ruda Śląska, Poland

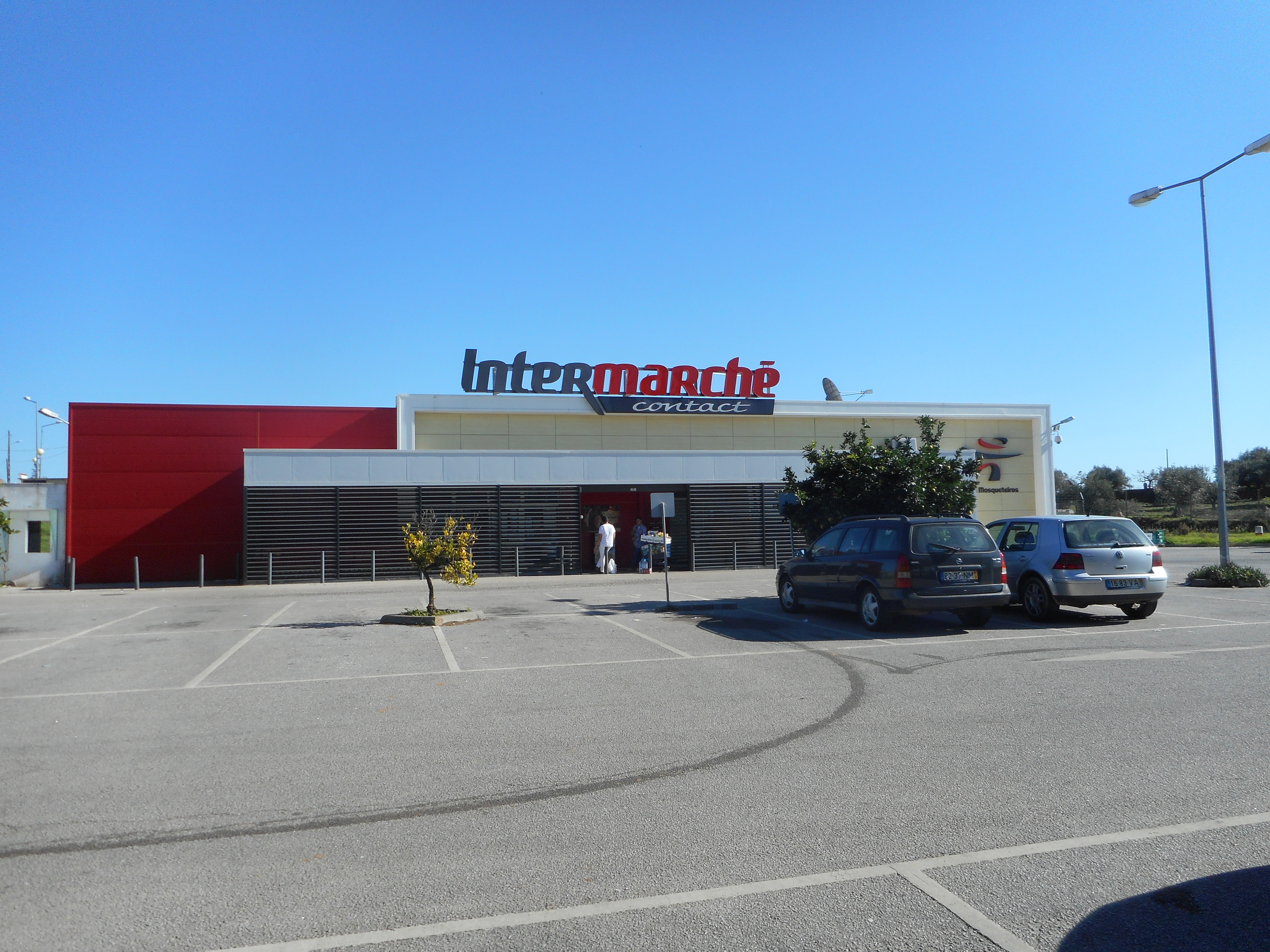
Intermarché Contact in Portel, Portugal

Founded in 1969 under the name of EX Offices de distribution, the chain became Intermarché in 1973.

On 9 June 2005, Les Mousquetaires announced the extension of the Intermarché brand to all their grocery subsidiaries, except Netto. Now Intermarché decline is based on the sales floor, as well as its location.

The old food stores owned by Les Mousquetaires under several brands, as well as the existing Intermarché stores have been divided into several groups:

- Intermarché Hyper for the largest stores between 3,200 m^{2} and 6,000 m^{2}
- Intermarché Super around 2,000 m^{2}, for most Intermarché stores
- Intermarché Express convenience stores installed in city centers
- Intermarché Contact convenience stores in rural areas which mostly replace Écomarché stores.

On 8 October 2014, ITM Intermarché and the Casino Group announced an agreement to rally their purchases together toward suppliers in France. This alliance makes these two groups the first retail purchaser in the country with a market share of 25.8%.

In January 2024, 190 Casino and Géant Casino stores are purchased by Intermarché.

In 2025, Intermarché acquired 81 stores from Colruyt, a Belgian brand that has been present in eastern France for about thirty years.

== Locations ==
In 2024, Intermarché had 2,496 stores in 5 countries.

- France
- Belgium
- Portugal
- Poland
- Monaco

=== Partenaire Intermarché ===
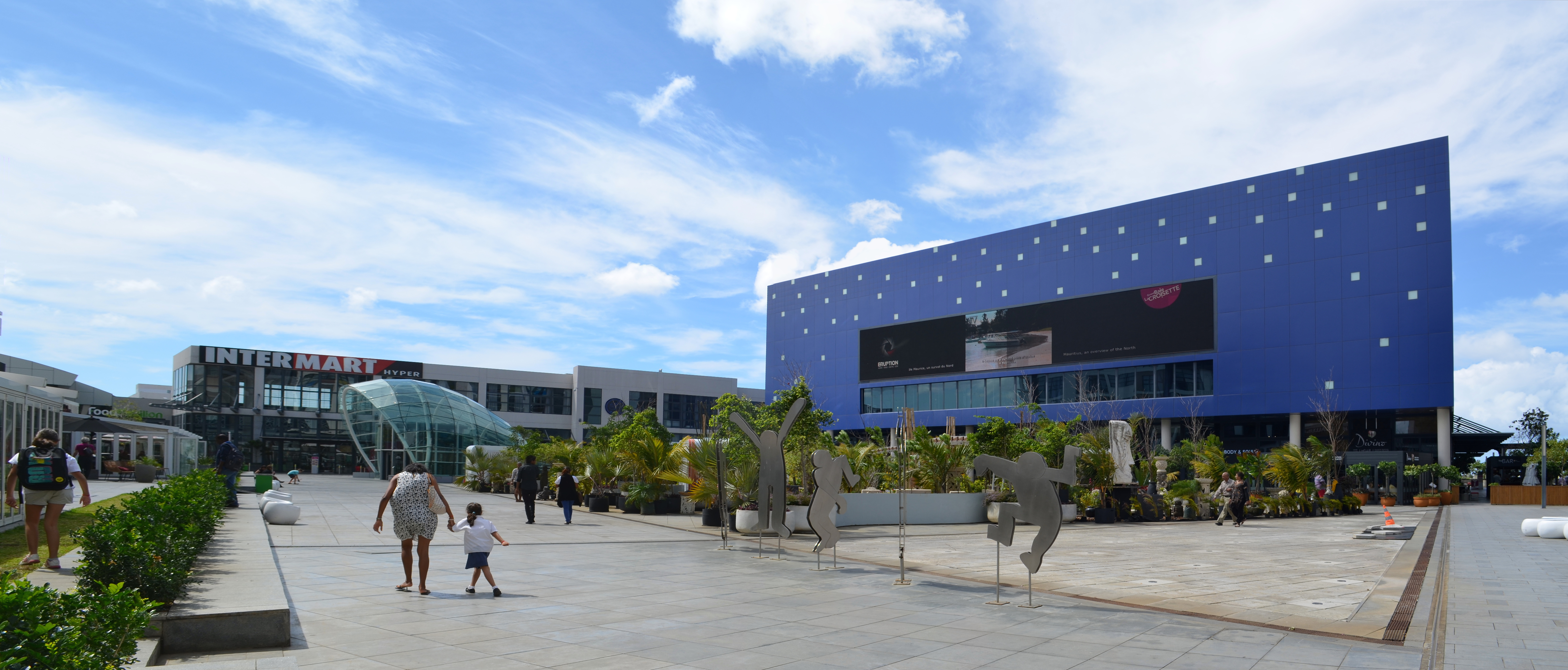
Intermart, Partenaire Intermarché in Grand Baie, Mauritius.

In 2024, Partenaire Intermarché had 60 stores in Overseas France and in 7 countries.

==== Overseas France ====
- Mayotte
- Reunion Island
- Guadeloupe
- Martinique
- Guyana
- New Caledonia
- Tahiti
- Wallis and Futuna

==== Africa ====
- Cameroon
- Republic of the Congo
- Gabon
- Mauritius
- Madagascar
- Central African Republic

==== Asia ====
- Lebanon

==== Europe ====
- Georgia

== Former locations ==
Intermarché left the Romanian market in 2012 because of poor sales. It was known as Interex (ro) in Romania.

In December 2014, all 24 Interex stores in Bosnia and Herzegovina were sold to Bingo. Also, it left Serbian market a year later, in 2015. Serbian Interex stores were sold to Aman.

It had 53 supermarkets in Spain, mostly in Cataluña, which were all bought by Bon Preu group in 2009.

== Own brands ==
Intermarché offers a range of its own brands :

- Chabrior (flour-based food baked such as bread, cookies, cakes, pastries)
- Paquito (fruit-based products such as juices, stewed fruits etc.)
- Monique Ranou / Claude Léger (catering-food)
- Pâturages (dairy products)
- Saint Eloi (tinned food)
- Look (non alcoholic drinks)
- Apta (cleaning products)
- Elodie (sugar-based food such as marmalades and candies)
- Top budget (series of cheaper products for smaller budgets)

== Écomarché ==
The Écomarché chain of supermarkets was created in 1969 and developed in 1986. They were similar to Intermarché, but mostly on a smaller scale than most supermarkets in France with a sales area between 400 and 1800 m^{2}. The target of the Écomarché chain was to compensate for the lack of local shops and to focus upon customer care, attention to the product, quality, choice and the environment.

From 2009, the Écomarché chain became two brands of the Intermarché, either Intermarché Contact if smaller than 1,500 square meters or Intermarché Super if bigger. The other Écomarché stores in urban areas became Intermarché Express or Intermarché Super (if larger than 1,500 sq. meters).

Écomarché stores could be found in Belgium, Portugal and France, which all became Intermarché Contact or Express.
