= List of supermarket chains in Belgium =

This is a list of supermarket chains in Belgium. As of 2011, in Belgium three major groups form more than two thirds of the market: Colruyt group 27%, Delhaize 22.5% and Carrefour 22%. Then there are Aldi 11%, Lidl 5.6% and Makro 4.5%.

== Current supermarket chains ==
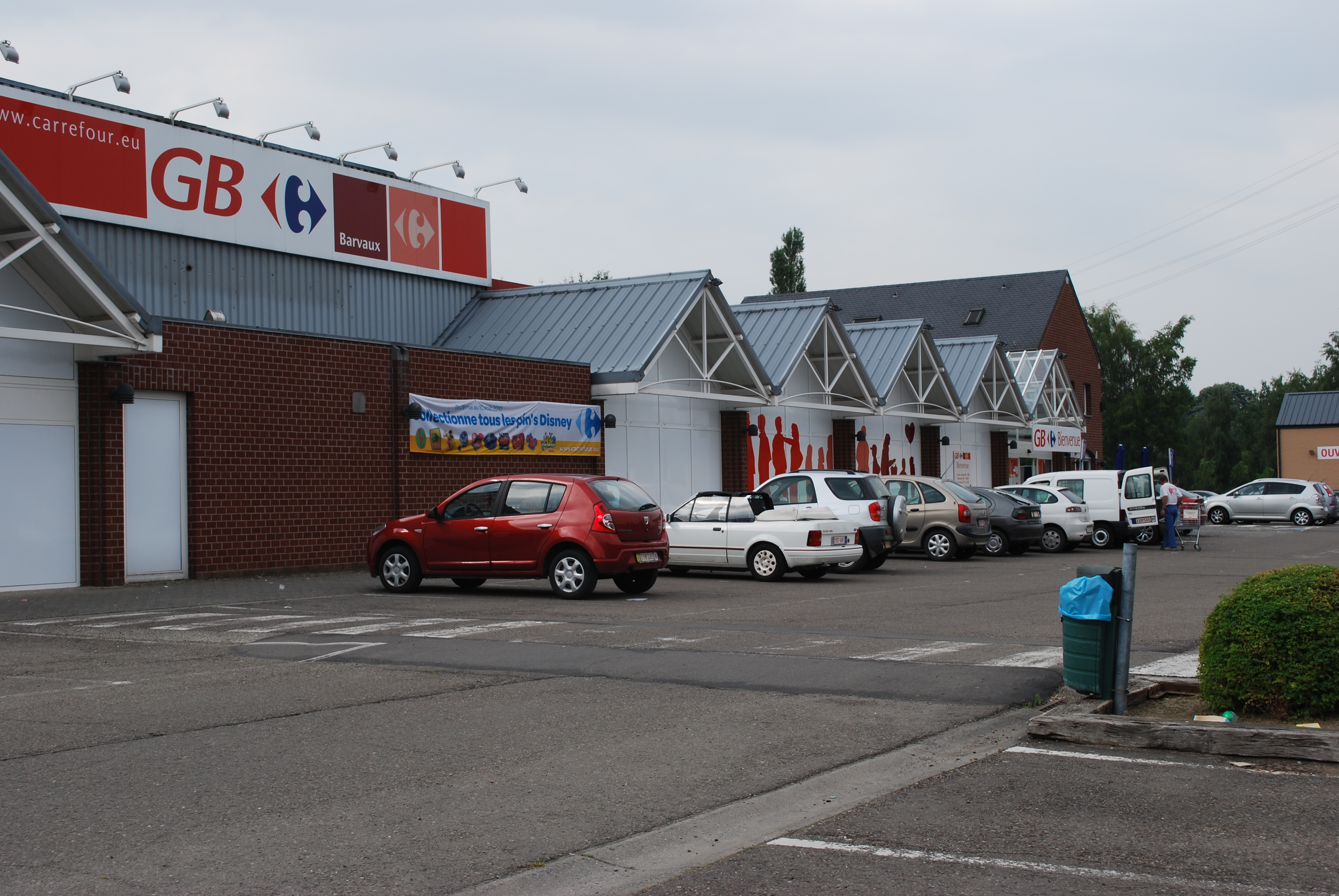
In 2010, a Carrefour GB supermarket, now a Carrefour Market in Barvaux-sur-Ourthe, Wallonia.

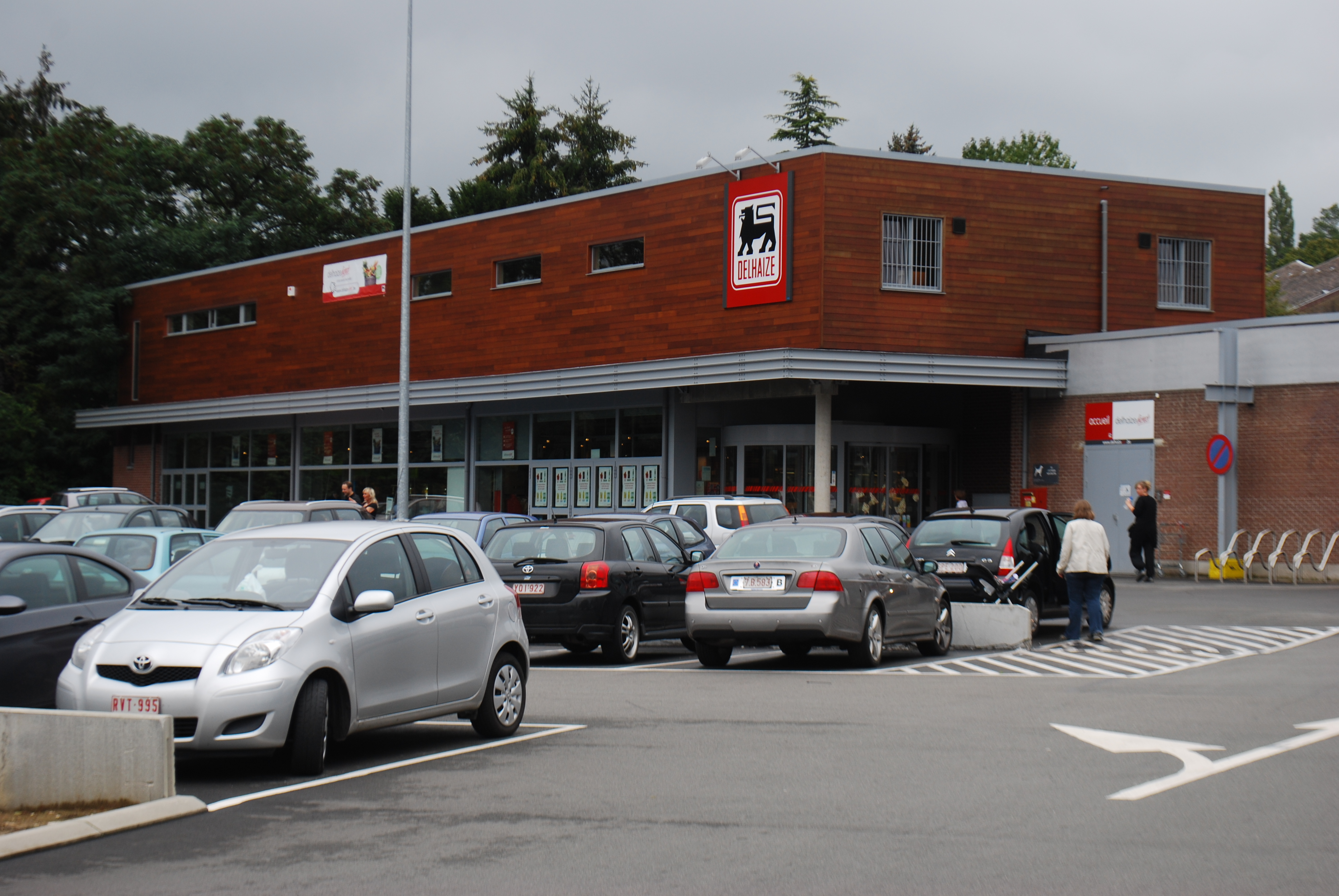
Delhaize supermarket in Embourg, Chaudfontaine, Wallonia

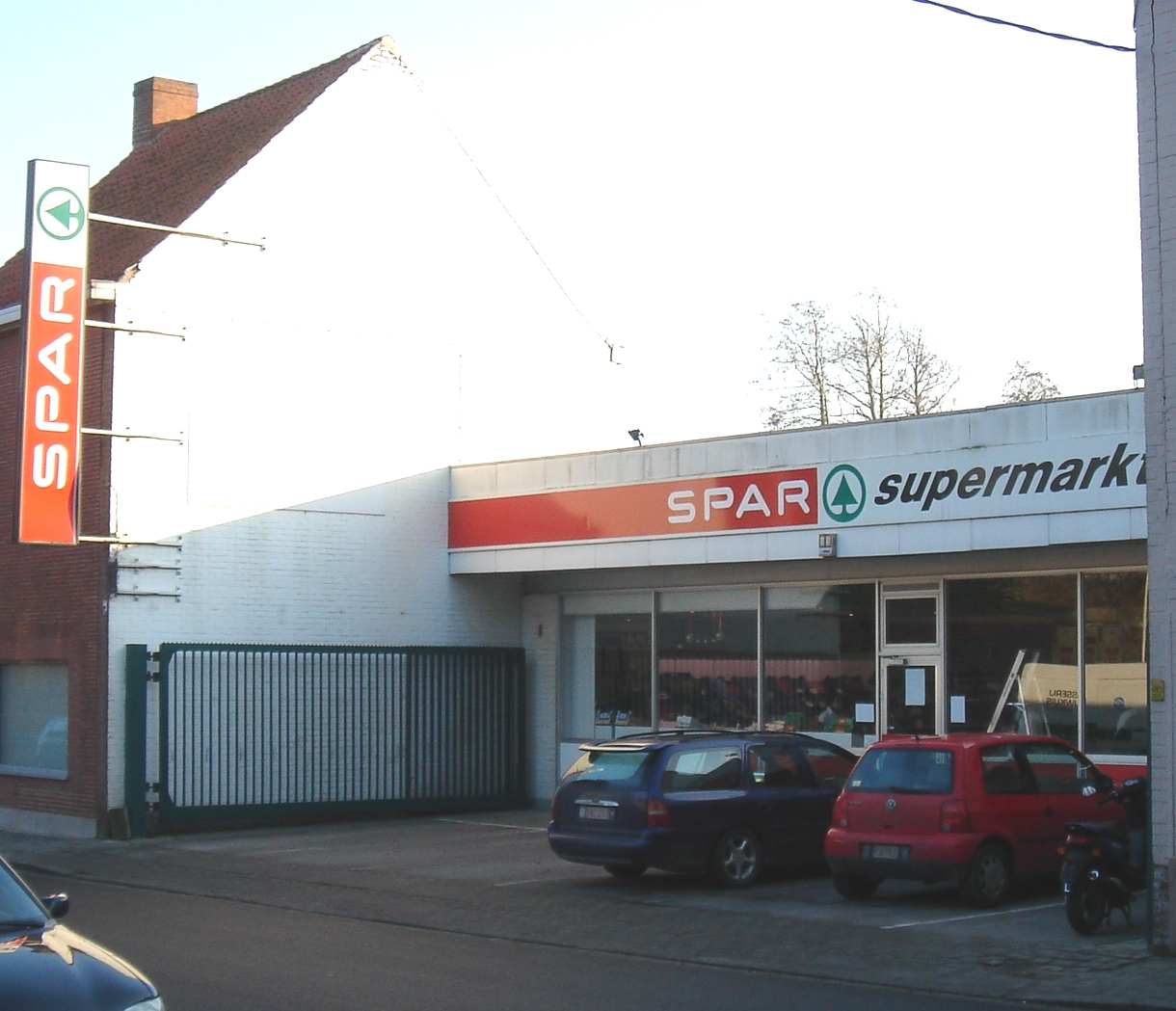
A SPAR supermarket in Lendelede, Flanders.

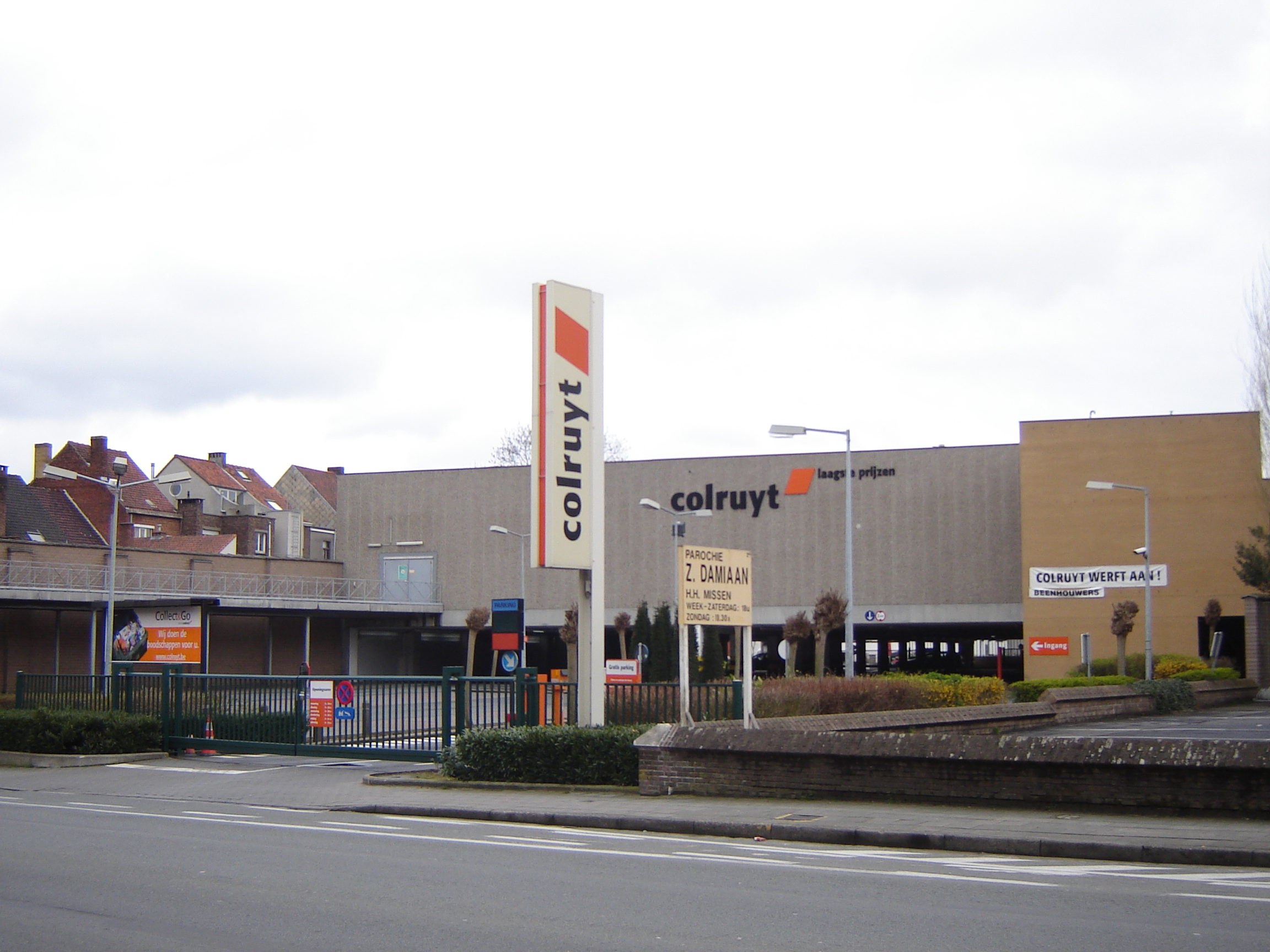
Colruyt supermarket in Kortrijk, Flanders.

Name	Stores	Type of stores	Parent or brand owner
Delhaize	134	supermarket	Ahold Delhaize
AD Delhaize	217	supermarket	Ahold Delhaize
Proxy Delhaize	228	convenience	Ahold Delhaize
Delhaize Shop & Go	112	convenience	Ahold Delhaize
Albert Heijn	42	supermarket	Ahold Delhaize
Aldi	457	discount	Aldi
Carrefour	45	hypermarket	Carrefour Group
Carrefour Market	445	supermarket	Carrefour Group
Carrefour Express	290	convenience	Carrefour Group
Colruyt	247	supermarket	Colruyt Group
Bio-Planet	24	supermarket	Colruyt Group
OKay	129	discount	Colruyt Group
Intermarché	87	convenience	Les Mousquetaires
Lidl	300	discount	Lidl
Match	117	supermarket	Louis Delhaize Group
Makro	6	cash & carry	Metro AG
Leader Price	9	discount	Groupe Casino
Jumbo (supermarket)	38	supermarket	Van Eerd Group
SPAR	316	supermarket	SPAR

== Defunct supermarket chains ==
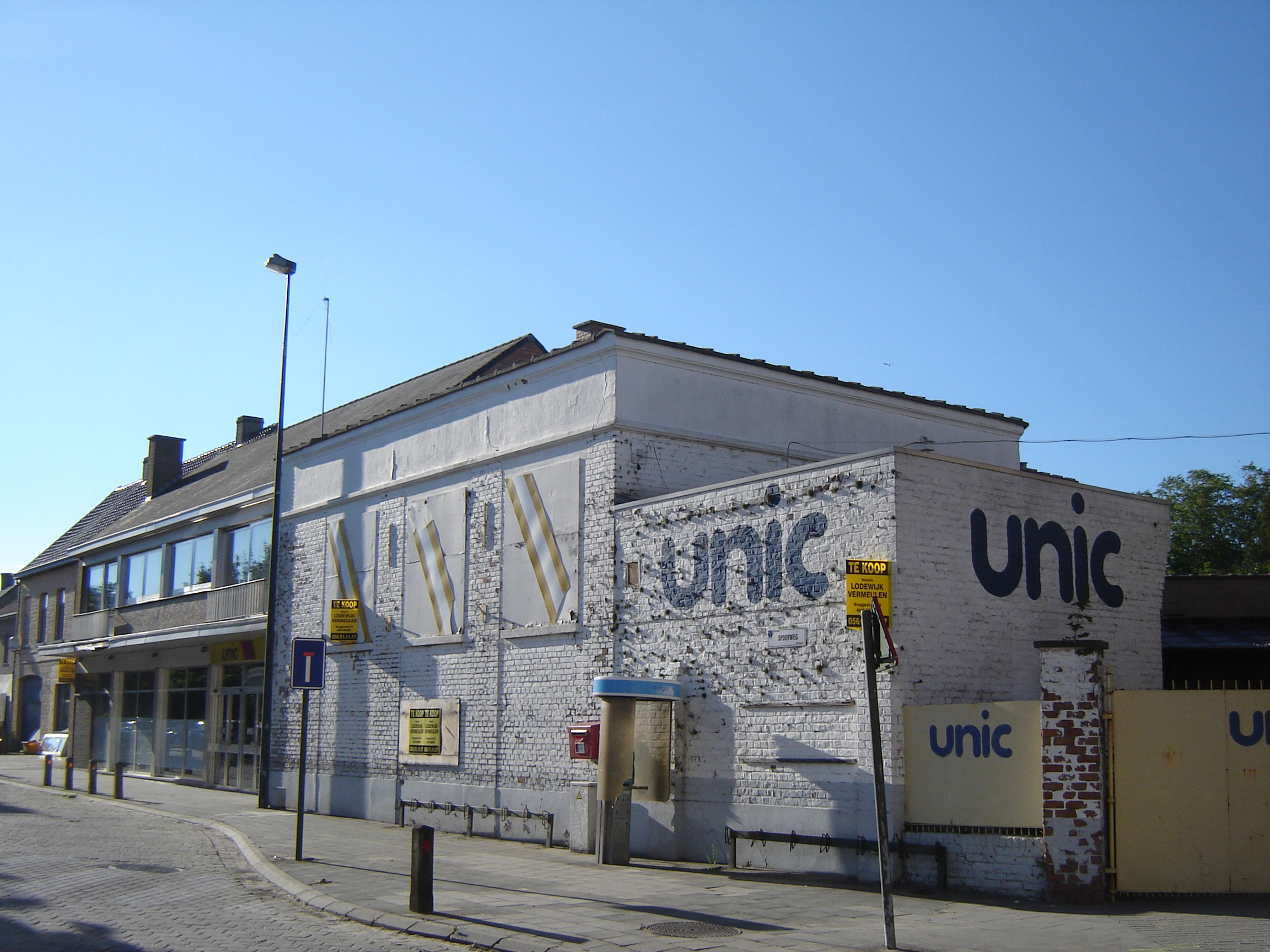
Former, not rebranded Unic supermarket in Eernegem, Flanders, Belgium.

- Écomarché (owned by Les Mousquetaires, now rebranded to Intermarché Contact or Intermarché Super)
- GB Supermarkets, Taken over by Carrefour. Before that, the stores belonged to the now defunct GIB Group, almost all GB stores were later rebranded to become Carrefour stores:
  - Maxi GB (now: Carrefour)
  - Super GB (now: Carrefour Market)
  - GB Express (now: Carrefour Express)
  - Bigg's Continent (now: Carrefour hypermarkets)
- Jawa (was a supermarket chain, all its stores were taken over in 1995 to become Match supermarkets)
- Profi (was a discount store owned by Louis Delhaize Group, rebranded to Smatch supermarket)
- Unic (rebranded to Super GB and later Carrefour GB.)
