= List of supermarket chains in Hungary =

This is a list of supermarket chains in Hungary.

== Grocery stores ==
=== Hypermarkets and cash & carry stores ===
Name	Stores	Type of stores	First store in Hungary	Parent
Auchan	19	hypermarket	23 April 1998 (age 28)	Indotek Group
Interspar	35	hypermarket	2 September 1995 (age 30)	ASPIAG
Tesco	110	hypermarket	14 November 1996 (age 29)	Tesco
Metro	13	cash & carry	1994	Metro AG

==== Gallery ====
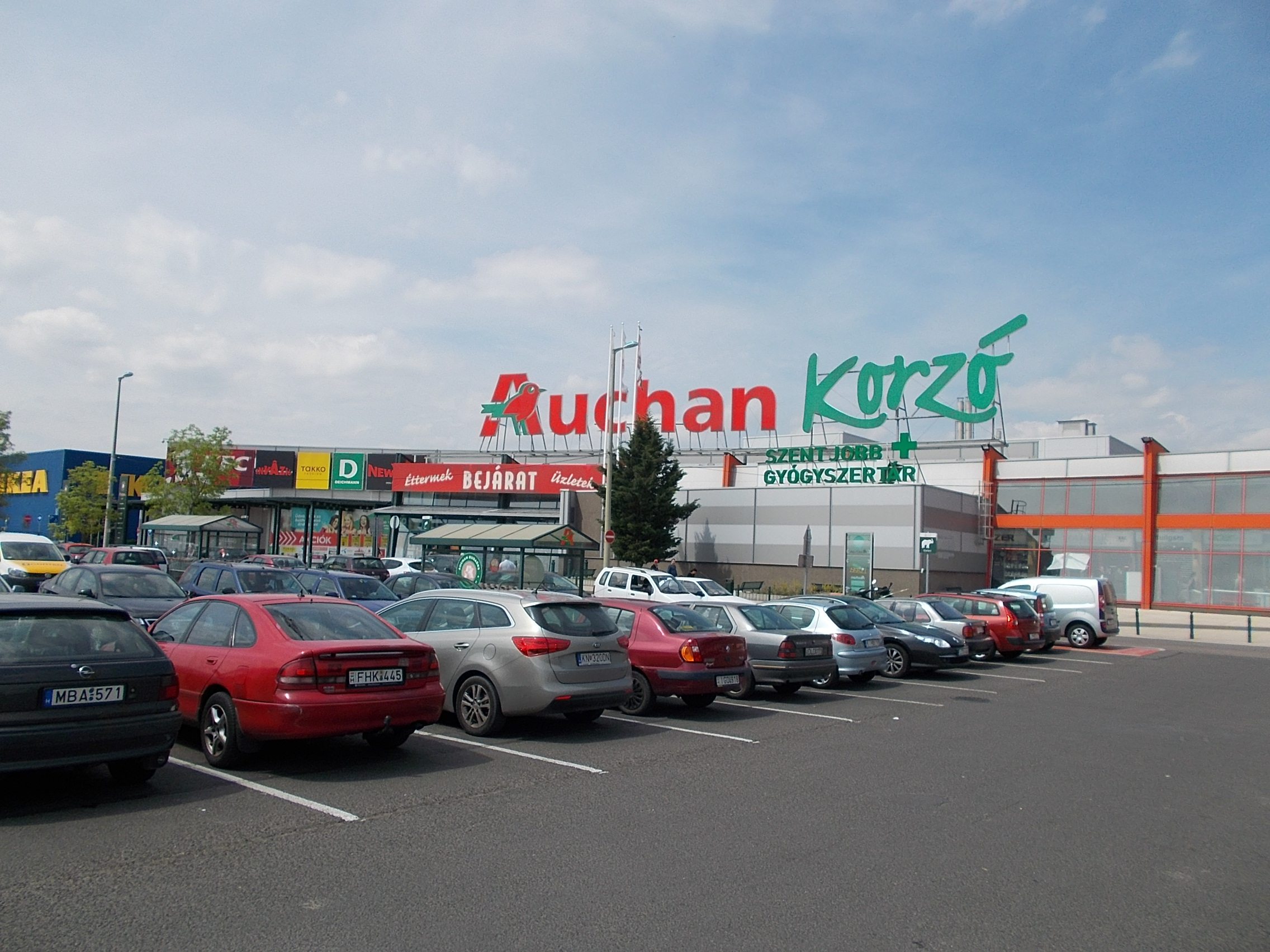
Auchan store entrance

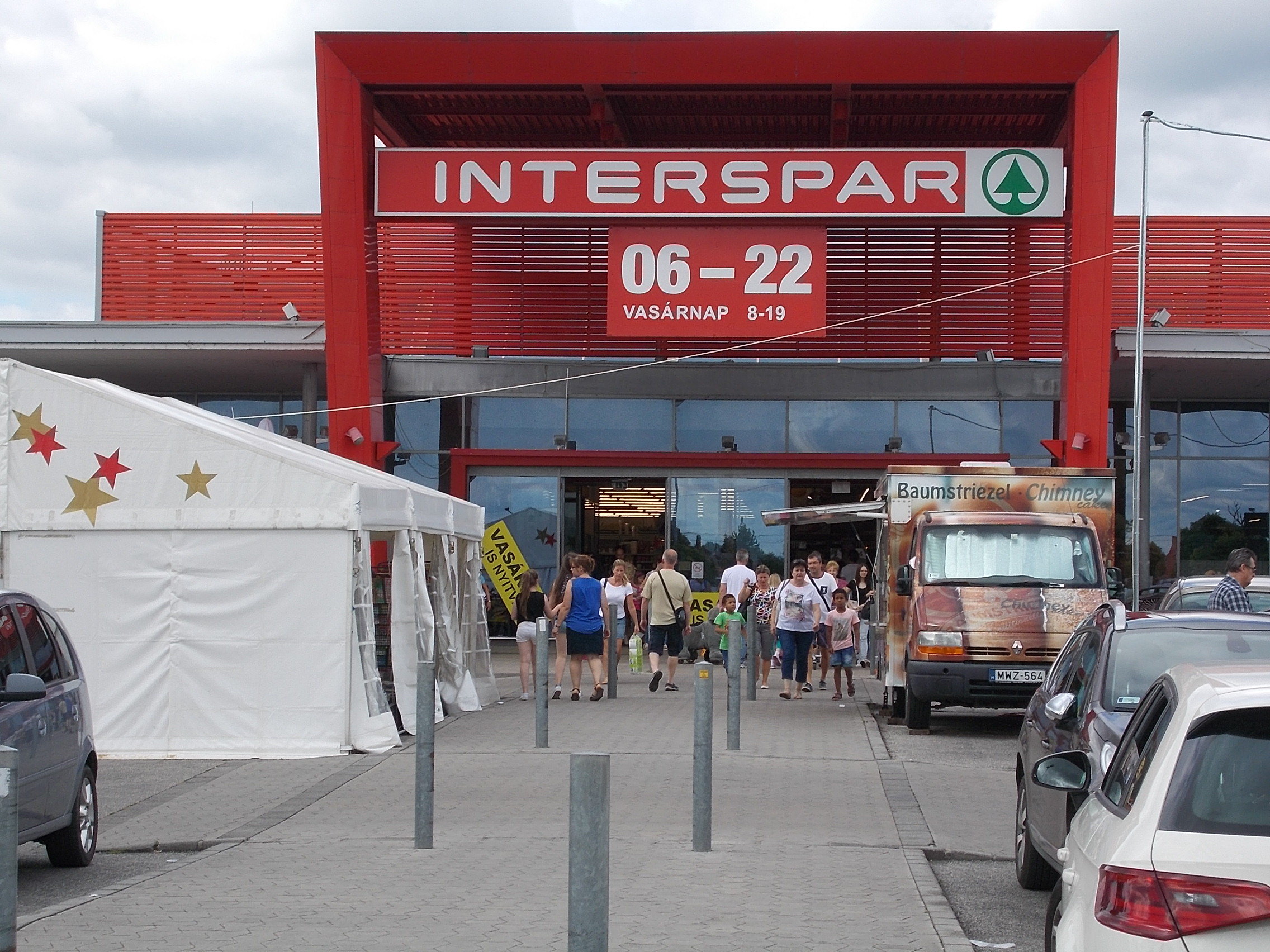
Interspar store entrance

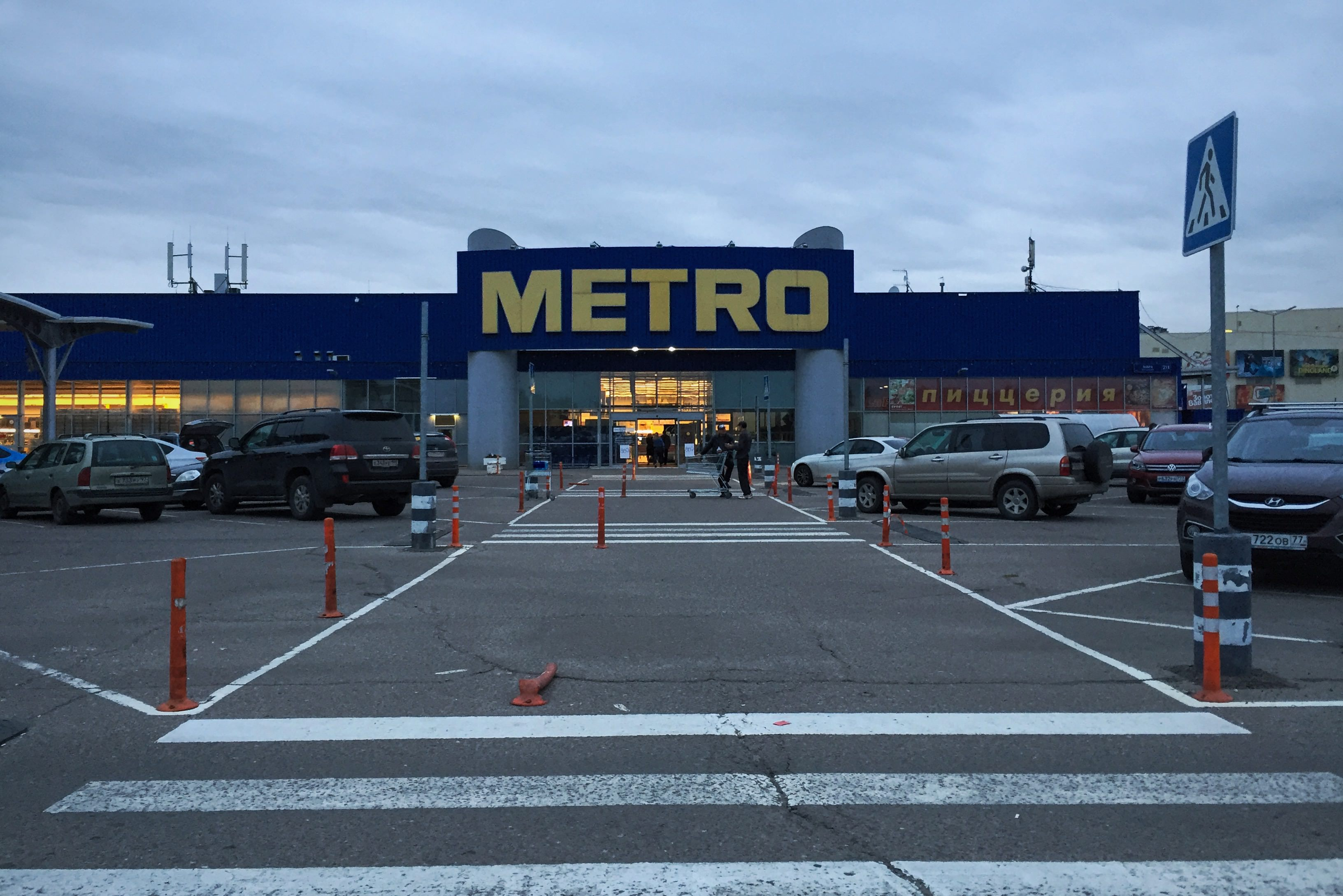
Metro store entrance

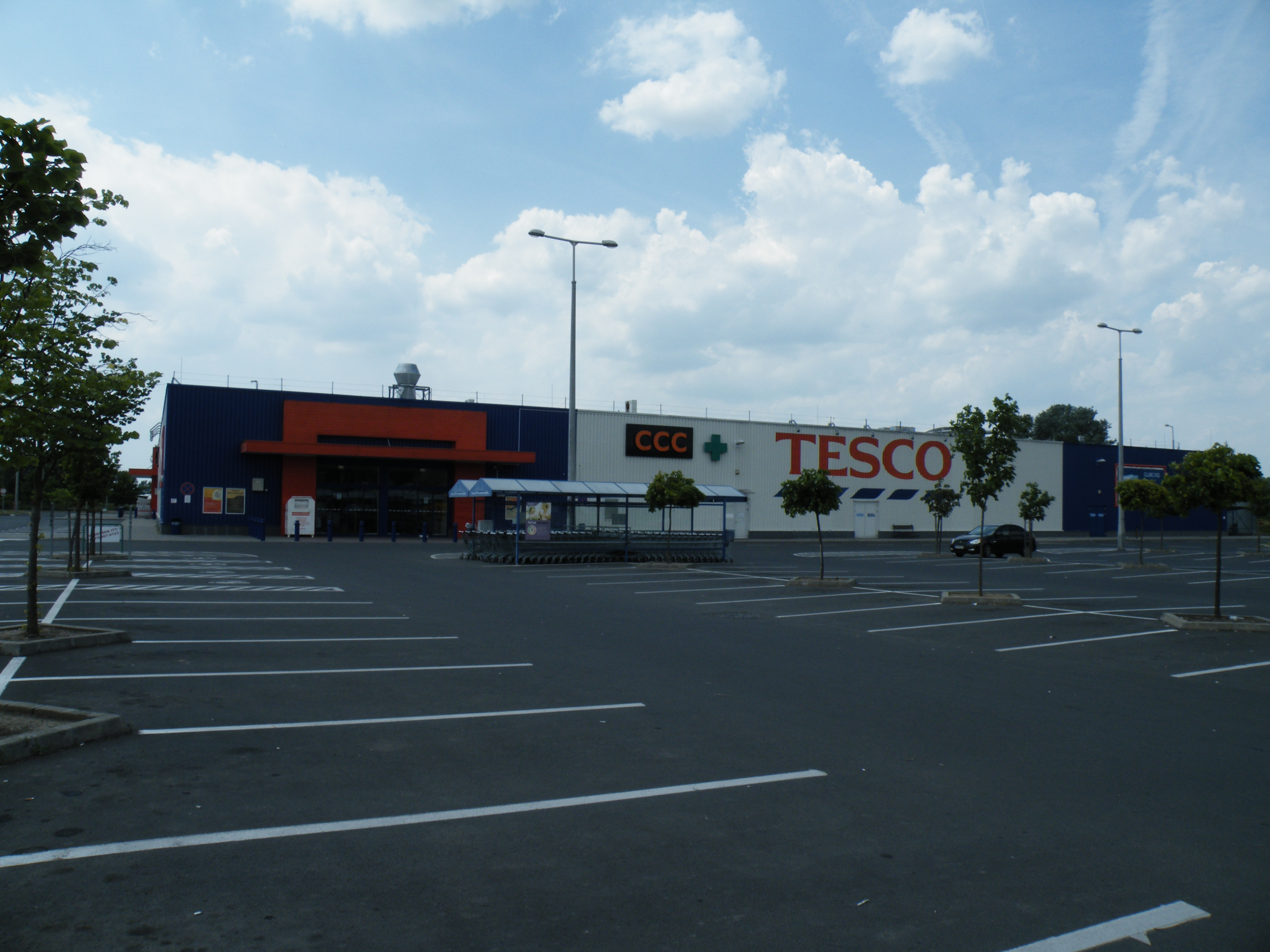
Tesco store entrance

=== Discount supermarkets ===
Name	Stores	First store in Hungary	Parent
Lidl	211	18 November 2004 (age 21)	Schwarz Gruppe
Aldi	182	17 April 2008 (age 18)	Aldi Süd
Penny	238	6 June 1996 (age 30)	REWE Group
Basket Plus	1	3 December 2025 (age 7 months)	MERE
CBA (CBA Cent)	38	12 November 2009 (age 16)	CBA
Goods Market			Kevaimpex Kft. (Northern Hungary); Dél-100 Kft. (Southern Hungary)

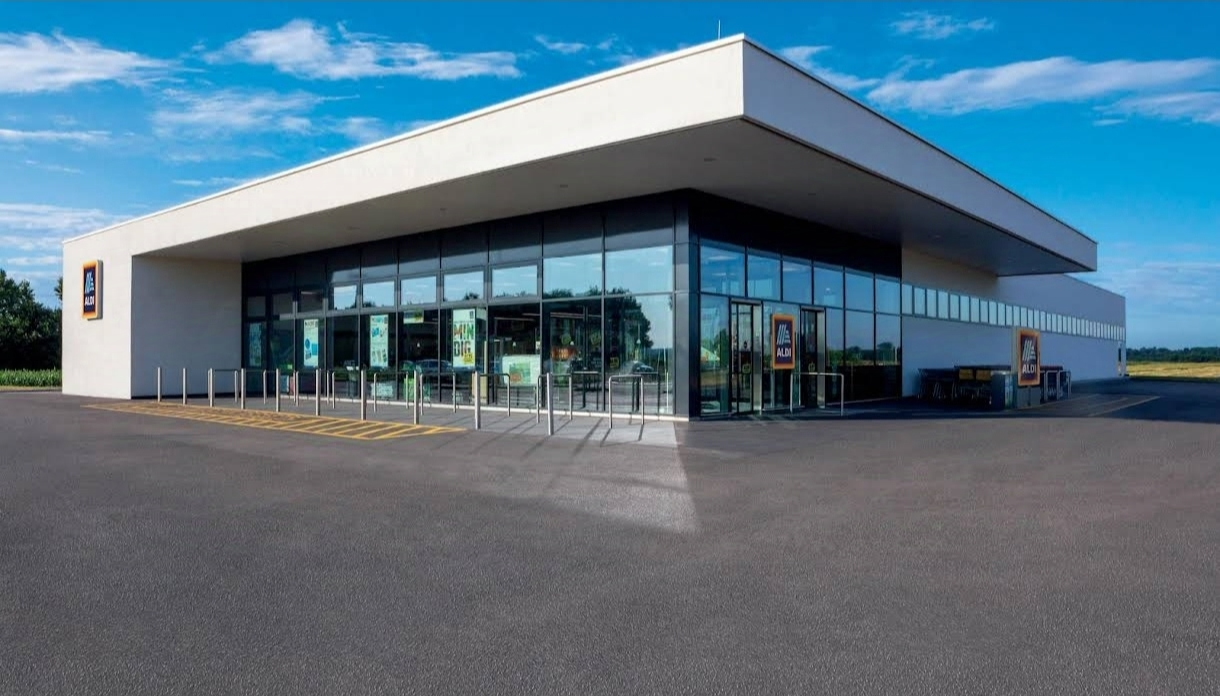
Aldi store entrance

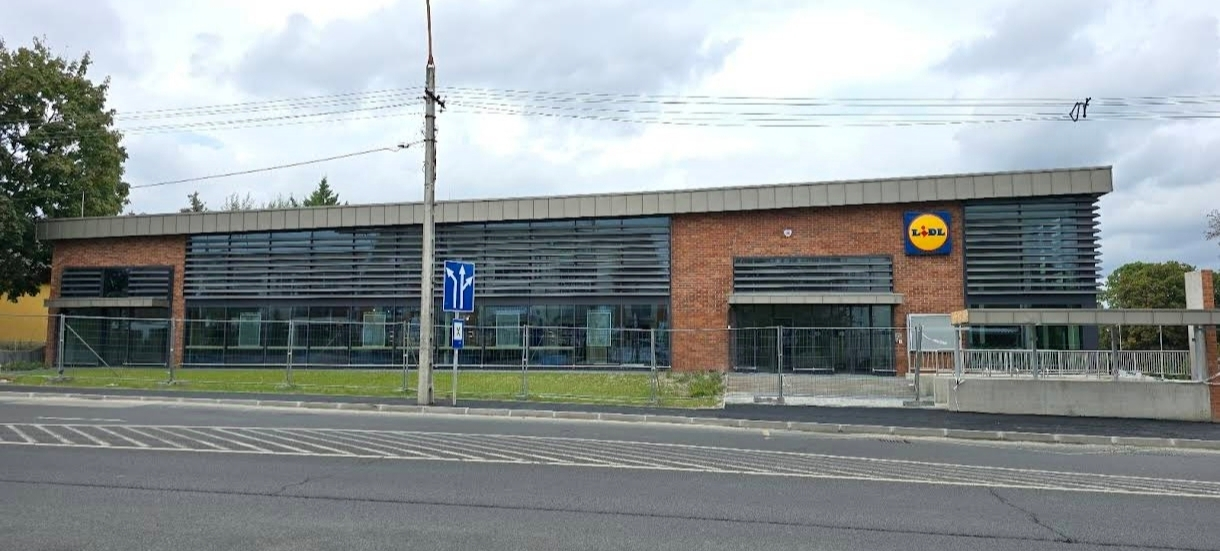
Lidl store entrance

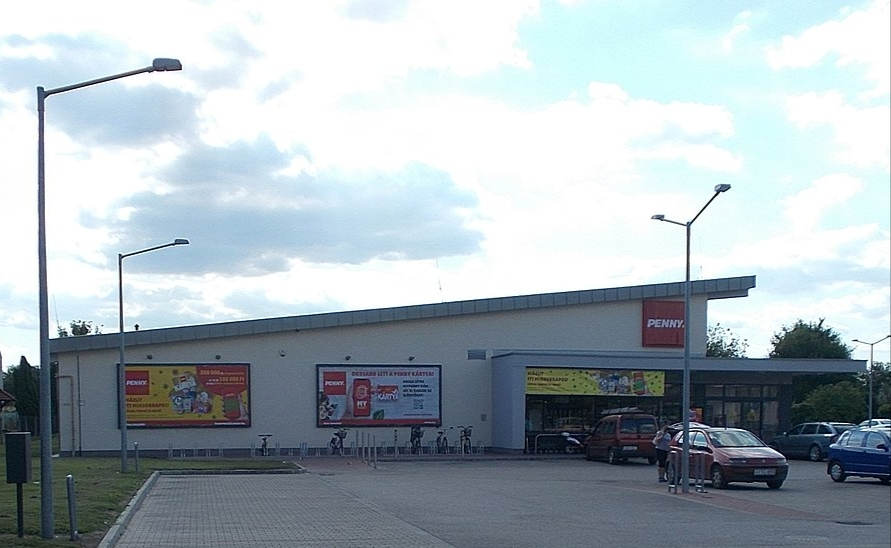
Penny Market store entrance

=== Supermarkets ===
Name	Stores
Auchan	5
CBA (Príma)	141
Coop (Coop Szuper, Coop C+C)	423
Spar (Spar, City Spar, Spar Partner, Spar Express)	377
Tesco (Expressz, Szupermarket)	93

=== Regional and local chains ===
Name	Stores
CBA	2359
Coop	5057
Reál	2310
Privát	100+

== Specialty chains ==
=== Consumer electronics ===
Retail chain	Type	Stores	Background/ Notes
BestByte	Electronics	79	
DOMO	Electronics	79	
Elektro Outlet	Electronics	10	
eMAG	Electronics	2	
Euronics	Electronics	66	
Expert	Electronics	21	
Flanco	Electronics	21	
Media Markt	Electronics	32	

=== Culture and Multimedia ===
Retail chain	Type	Stores	Background/ Notes
576 KByte	Multimedia	6	
Libri	Bookstore	~60	
Líra	Bookstore	~60	
Inmedio	Newsstand	160	
RELAY	Newsstand	80	
Konzolvilág	Multimedia	25	

=== Drugstore chains ===
Retail chain	Type	Stores	Background/ Notes
Clinique	Beauty product		
dm	Drugstore	260	
Douglas	Cosmetics	18	
Estée Lauder	Cosmetics		
Herbária	Herbal store	95	
L'Occitane	Cosmetics	7	
M·A·C	Cosmetics	~5	
Marionnaud	Cosmetics	15	
Müller	Cosmetics	36	
Rossmann	Drugstore	208	
Vianni	Drugstore	29	
Yves Rocher	Cosmetics	31	

=== Furniture ===
Retail chain	Type	Stores	Background/ Notes
IKEA	Furniture	3	Ready-to-assemble furniture
Jysk	Furniture	71	
Kika	Furniture	6	
Möbelix	Furniture	7	
Mömax	Furniture	10	
RS Bútor	Furniture	3	
DIEGO	Furniture (carpets, curtains mainly)	97	

=== Hardware store chains ===
Retail chain	Type	Stores	Background/ Notes
Bauhaus	Home improvement, DIY	3	
OBI	Home improvement, DIY	29	
Praktiker	Home improvement, DIY	20	

== Fashion ==
Retail chain	Type	Stores	Background/ Notes
Adidas	Sports equipment		
Benetton	Clothing		
Bershka	Clothing	10	
Bijou Brigitte	Accessory	~15	
budmil	Sports equipment	35	
C&A	Clothing	36	
Calzedonia	Clothing	~30	Undergarments, bathing suits etc.
Camaïeu	Clothing	21	
CCC	Shoes	70	
Charles Vögele	Clothing	27	
Claire's	Accessory, Jewellery	~10	
Columbia	Clothing, sports goods		
Converse	Shoes, clothing	89	
Decathlon	Sports goods	20	
Deichmann	Shoes	116	
Desigual	Clothing	40	
Devergo	Clothing	27	
ecco	Shoes		
Gant	Clothing		
Geox	Shoes, clothing		
Guess	Clothing	~20	
H&M	Clothing	42	
Háda	Clothing	~80	
Helly Hansen	Clothing, shoes	34	
Hervis	Sports goods	27	
Humanic	Shoes	21	
Intersport	Sports goods	14	
Intimissimi	Clothing	~20	Undergarments specialist.
KiK	Textile discount	~50	
Levi's	Clothing	~30	
Mango	Clothing	8	
Massimo Dutti	Clothing	3	
Mayo Chix	Clothing	~60	
Nautica	Clothing		
Nike	Sports equipment		
NewYorker	Clothing	28	
Ofotért	Spectacles	96	
Oysho	Clothing	2	
Pandora	Jewellery	~15	
Peek & Cloppenburg	Clothing	1	
Pepco	Textile discount, Clothing	109	
Pepe Jeans	Clothing	6	
Promod	Clothing	17	
Pull&Bear	Clothing	7	
Puma	Sports equipment		
Reserved	Clothing	10	
s.Oliver	Clothing		
Skechers	Shoes	3	
Sports Direct	Sports goods	9	
Stradivarius	Clothing	~10	
Superdry	Clothing		
Swarovski	Jewellery	~15	
Takko	Clothing	52	
Tally Weijl	Clothing	19	
Tatuum	Clothing	|	
Tezenis	Clothing	~30	Undergarments, bathing suits etc.
Timberland	Clothing, sports goods		
Tisza Cipő	Shoes	7	
Tom Tailor	Clothing		
Triumph	Clothing	~45	Undergarments specialist.
Vision Express	Spectacles	44	
Women'secret	Clothing	~10	Undergarments specialist.
Zara	Clothing	8	

== Former chains ==
- Arzenál
- bauMax (1992–2015)
- Billa (1999 –2002)
- Bricostore (1999–2012)
- Cora (1997–2012)
- Csemege Julius Meinl ( –2001)
- Interfruct (1990–2008)
- Jééé
- Kaiser's (1994–2011)
- Match (2001–2013)
- Plus (1992–2010)
- Profi (1989–2012)
- Super Közért
