= Colruyt =

Colruyt may refer to:

- Colruyt Group, a Belgian family-owned retail corporation
- Colruyt (supermarket), a Belgian supermarket chain
- Colruyt family, a Belgian noble family
