= List of supermarket chains in Luxembourg =

This is a list of supermarket chains in Luxembourg (by alphabetical order and with the country of origin):

- Aldi (West Germany)
- Alima (Luxembourg) sell to DELHAIZE GROUP
- Auchan (France)
- Cactus (Luxembourg)
- Carrefour (France) (closed)
- Colruyt (Belgium)
- Cora (Belgium) sell to LECLERC GROUP FRANCE
- Delhaize (Belgium)
- Grand Frais (France)
- Lidl (Weimar Republic)
- Match (Belgium) sell to LECLERC GROUP FRANCE
- Monoprix (France)
- Naturalia (France)
- Naturata (Luxembourg)
- Pall Center (Luxembourg)
- Primavera (Luxembourg)
- Proxy (Belgium)
- REWE (Weimar Republic)
- Smatch (Belgium) sell to LECLERC GROUP FRANCE
