= E.Leclerc =

French supermarket chain

- E.Leclerc headquarters in Ivry-sur-Seine, France
- Type: Private, cooperative
- Industry: Retail
- Founded: 1948; 78 years ago
- Founder: Édouard Leclerc
- Headquarters: Ivry-sur-Seine, France
- Area served: Worldwide
- Key people: Michel Édouard Leclerc (President)
- Products: Hypermarket, supermarket, supercenter, superstore, discount store
- Revenue: ▲US$ 56.87 billion (2019)
- Number of employees: 133,000 (2019)
- Website: e.leclerc

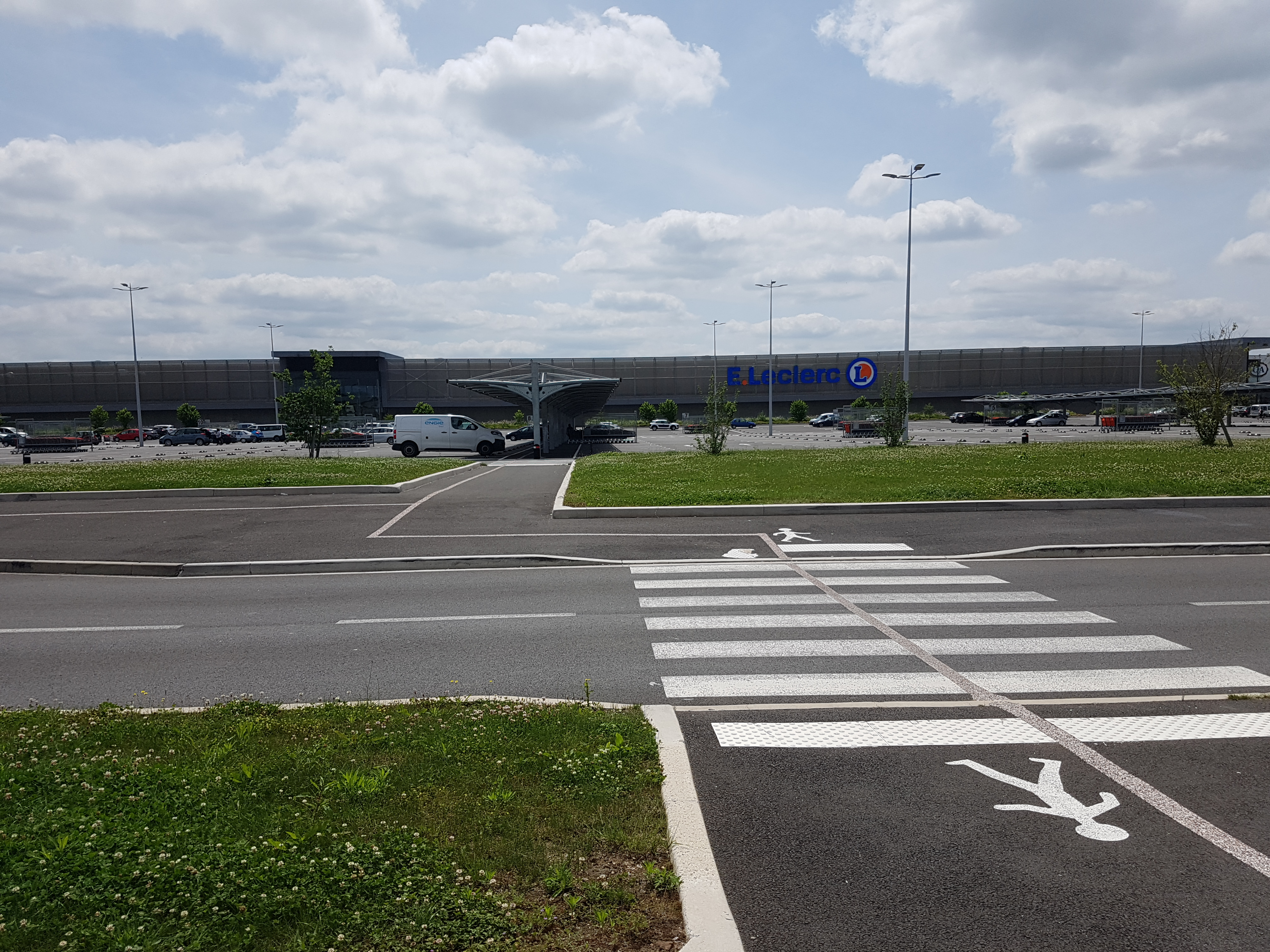
E.Leclerc in Avermes, France, 2016

E.Leclerc (informally simply Leclerc, French pronunciation: [ləklɛʁ]) is a French retailers' cooperative and hypermarket chain, headquartered in Ivry-sur-Seine. E.Leclerc was established on 1 January 1948 by Édouard Leclerc in Brittany. E.Leclerc currently has more than 720 locations in France and 85 stores outside of the country, as of 2019. The chain enables semi-independent stores to operate under the Leclerc brand.

Its own brand ranges come under the Marque Repère and Eco+ banners, as well as a mobile virtual network operator called Réglo Mobile which uses the mobile network of SFR. Some larger hypermarkets have a separate entertainment/multimedia section, under the name of Espace Culturel. E.Leclerc operates numerous stores and services around France, some near and in cities and towns while most of them are located just outside or in the hypermarkets and shopping centres.

== History ==
In 1949, Édouard Leclerc opened his first store, in Landerneau, in Brittany, on the same model as the self-service grocery store invented by Félix Potin in 1844. Subsequently, in the 1950s, a new brand called E.Leclerc clothing opens its doors and the sixtieth E.Leclerc centre also opens its doors in Issy-les-Moulineaux by Jean-Pierre Le Roch. In 1962, the E.Leclerc Centres Purchasing Group (GALEC) was created. In 1964, the Landerneau store expanded, becoming the first E.Leclerc hypermarket. From 1969, 75 centres withdrew to form the future Intermarché. Over the years, several spaces were founded such as Le Manège à Bijoux in 1986, E.Leclerc Voyages in 1987, L'auto E.Leclerc in 1988 and the Parapharmacy E.Leclerc in 1988 after the end of the pharmacists' monopoly on sales of parapharmacy products. In 1973, Édouard Leclerc invented the concept of wine fairs, which he launched in his supermarkets.

In 1991, E.Leclerc launched a first-price range and created the Tisaia brand, the first E.Leclerc clothing brand. In 1992, he opened his first store in Pamplona in Spain and began to expand in Europe. The first E.Leclerc Cultural Centre opened its doors in 1994. Leclerc opened its first store in Warsaw, Poland. E.Leclerc stopped distributing disposable plastic bags in 1996. The Repère brand was launched for the first time in 1997 by the brand. The following year, opening of the first E.Leclerc perfumery "One hour for oneself". During 1998, E.Leclerc and the Système U group joined forces and created a common purchasing centre called "Lucie". The agreement would last only three years. Only the fuel purchase activity survived and the entity was renamed "Synergie" without publicity.

== Central buying services ==
The E.Leclerc cooperative is composed of several regional central buying services that operate the group's stores in their respective areas. There are currently nineteen central buying services in activity. (The geographic zoning is not strictly defined, therefore two E.Leclerc-branded stores in the same region may be operated by different central buying services)

Name	Headquarters	Area of service
Scacentre	Yzeure, Allier	Auvergne, Cher, Saône-et-Loire
Scanormande	(Calvados (department)) Lisieux, Calvados	Normandy, French West Indies, Réunion
Scachap	Ruffec, Charente	Poitou-Charentes, Limousin
Scarmor	Landerneau, Finistère	Western Brittany (Côtes-d'Armor, Finistère, Morbihan)
Socamil	Castelnaudary, Aude	Occitania, Cantal, Andorra
Scaso	Cestas, Gironde	Corrèze, Dordogne, Gironde
Socara	Villette-d'Anthon, Isère	Rhône-Alpes, Slovenia
Scalandes	(Landes (department)) Mont-de-Marsan, Landes	Gers, Landes, Lot-et-Garonne, Pyrénées-Atlantiques, Hautes-Pyrénées, Spain and Portugal (fresh produce only)
Scaouest	Saint-Étienne-de-Montluc, Loire-Atlantique	Loire-Atlantique, Maine-et-Loire, Vendée, Eastern Brittany (Ille-et-Vilaine, Morbihan)
Scapest	(Marne (department)) Saint-Martin-sur-le-Pré, Marne	Champagne-Ardenne, Lorraine, Picardy, Seine-et-Marne, Yonne, Luxembourg
Scapartois	Tilloy-lès-Mofflaines, Pas-de-Calais	Nord-Pas-de-Calais, Somme, Seine-Maritime
Scapalsace	Colmar, Haut-Rhin	Alsace, Lorraine, Franche-Comté, Côte-d'Or
Socamaine	Champagné, Sarthe	Mayenne, Sarthe, Orne, Ille-et-Vilaine, Indre-et-Loire, Loir-et-Cher, Eure-et-Loir, Loiret
Scadif	Réau, Seine-et-Marne	Southern Île-de-France
Lecasud	(Var (department)) Le Luc, Var	Provence-Alpes-Côte d'Azur
Scapnor	Bruyères-sur-Oise, Val-d'Oise	Northern Île-de-France
Scaber	(Spain) Coslada	Spain
Cooplecnorte	(Portugal) Oliveira do Bairro	Portugal
Scawar	(Poland) Warsaw	Poland

== Leclerc stores ==
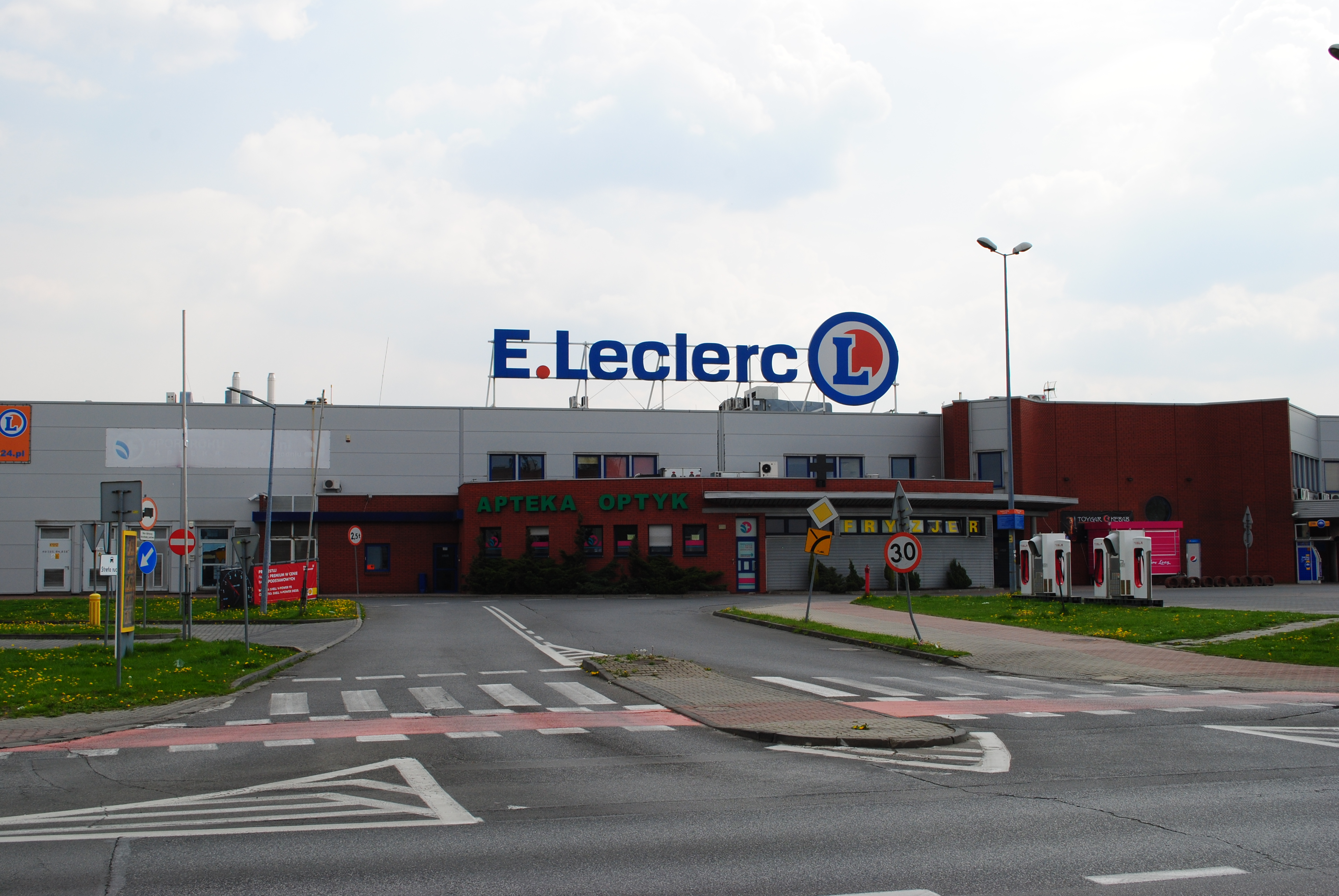
E.Leclerc store in Katowice, Poland

As of 2024, there are 726 E.Leclerc stores in France, along with 690 DRIVE stores. There are 112 stores outside of France. The first store outside of France was opened in Pamplona, Spain in 1992.

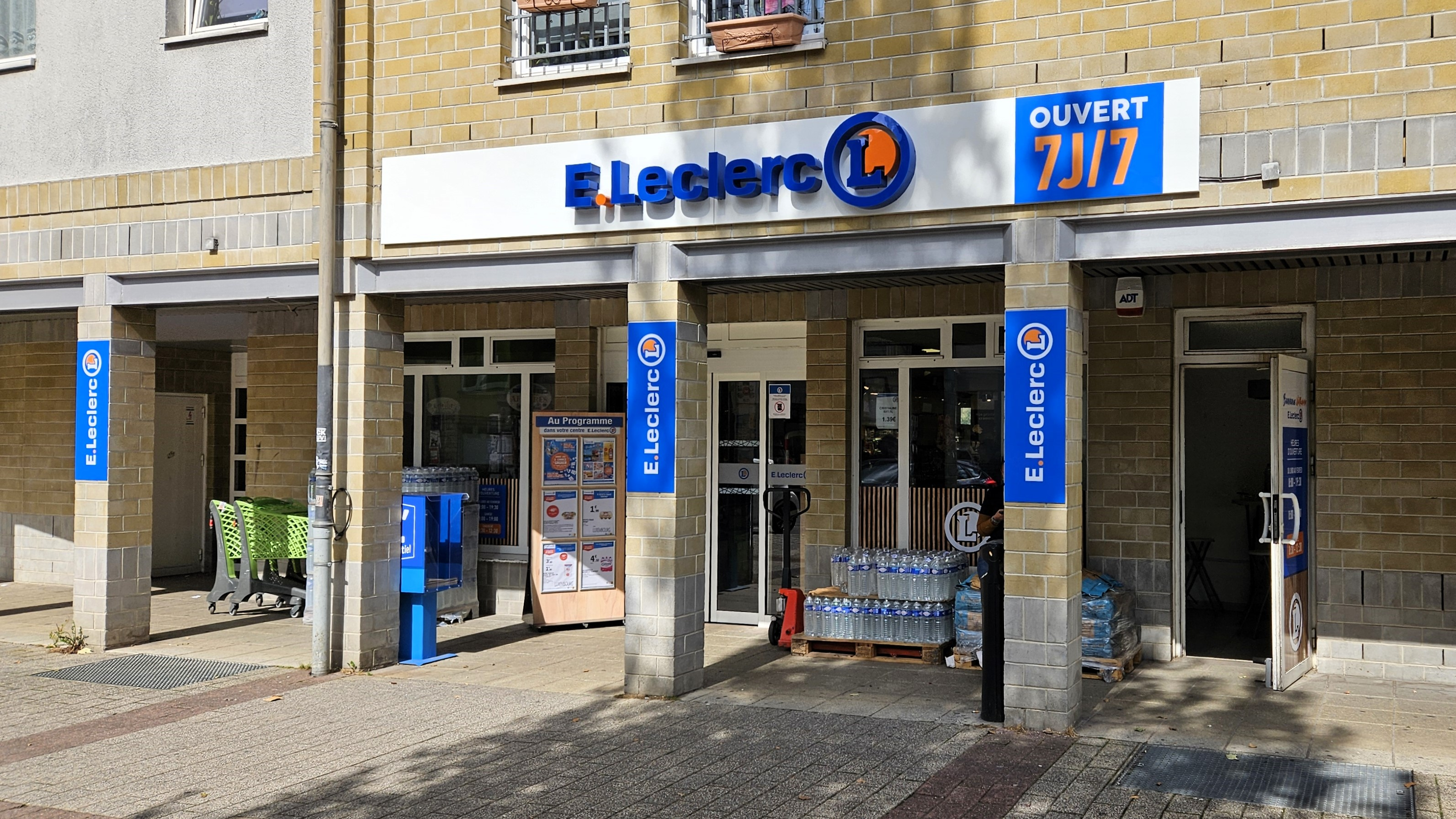
Recently opened E.Leclerc convenience store in Gasperich, Luxembourg

In 2023, E.Leclerc expanded into Luxembourg by acquiring the local branch of the Louis Delhaize Group, which operated 2 Cora hypermarkets and 25 Match and Smatch supermarkets. Stores started to operate under the E.Leclerc brand in the spring of 2024; this was the retailer's first international expansion in 13 years.

List of E.Leclerc stores by country
Country	Stores	First store opened
France	726	1949
Poland	43	1995
Luxembourg	27	2024
Portugal	21	1995
Spain	18	1992
Andorra	4	2011
Slovenia	2	2000

Until 2014, supermarket chain Conad also operated 30 stores in Italy under the E.Leclerc brand.
