= List of shopping malls in Hungary =

This is a list of shopping malls in Hungary.

== Shopping malls ==
- Agria Park, Eger (2008)
- Alba Plaza, Székesfehérvár (1999)
- Alba üzletház, Salgótarján (1999)
- Balaton Plaza, Veszprém (2004)
- Csaba Center, Békéscsaba (2001)
- Debrecen Fórum, Debrecen (2008)
- Debrecen Plaza, Debrecen (1998)
- Gyöngyház Plaza, Gyöngyös (2006)
- Győr Árkád, Győr (2006)
- Győr Plaza, Győr (1998)
- Kanizsa Plaza, Nagykanizsa (2000)
- Kaposvár Plaza, Kaposvár (2000)
- Keszthely Plaza, Keszthely (2003)
- Malom Központ, Kecskemét (2005)
- Miskolc Plaza, Miskolc (2000)
- Nyír Plaza, Nyíregyháza (2000)
- Nyíregyháza Korzó, Nyíregyháza (2008)
- Pécs Árkád, Pécs (2004)
- Pécs Plaza, Pécs (1999)
- Pelikán bevásárlóközpont, Szolnok (2008)
- Savaria Plaza, Szombathely (2001)
- Sió Plaza, Siófok (2012)
- Sopron Plaza, Sopron (1998)
- Szeged Árkád, Szeged (2011)
- Szeged Plaza, Szeged (2000)
- Szinva Park, Miskolc (2000)
- Szolnok Plaza, Szolnok (2001)
- Vértes Center, Tatabánya (2007)
- Zala Plaza, Zalaegerszeg (2002)

=== Budapest ===
- Allee (2009)
- Arena Plaza (2007)
- Árkád (2002)
- Asia Center (2003)
- Budagyöngye
- Campona
- Corvin Plaza (2010)
- Csepel Plaza (1997)
- Duna Plaza (1996)
- Etele Plaza (2021)
- GoBuda (Eurocenter until 2022)
- Eleven Center
- Europeum
- KöKi Terminál (2011)
- Lurdy Ház (1998)
- Mammut I
- Mammut II
- MOM Park (2001)
- Pólus Center
- Savoya Park
- Shopmark (1997) (Europark until 2017)
- Sugár (1980)
- Újbuda Center
- WestEnd City Center (1999)

=== Former shopping malls ===
- Omega Park, Tatabánya (2007-2009)
- Pólus Dráva, Barcs (1998-2002)

== Retail parks ==
=== Alpha Park ===
- Keszthely (2010) (GLA 14,000 m^{2})
- Sopron (2007) (GLA 15,000 m^{2})

=== Family Center ===
- Baja
- Budapest, Kőbánya
- Győr
- Hódmezővásárhely
- Keszthely
- Mohács
- Salgótarján
- Sopron
- Szolnok
- Szombathely

=== Park Center ===
- Debrecen (GLA 5,600 m^{2})
- Dunaújváros (*2)
- Kiskunhalas
- Miskolc (GLA 6,850 m^{2})
- Mosonmagyaróvár (GLA 4,500 m^{2})
- Nagykanizsa (GLA 5,060 m^{2})
- Siófok (GLA 4,600 m^{2})
- Szekszárd (GLA 5,600 m^{2})
- Zalaegerszeg (GLA 4,400 m^{2})

=== STOP SHOP ===
- Békéscsaba
- Budapest, Hűvösvölgy
- Budapest, Óbuda
- Budapest, Újpest
- Debrecen
- Érd
- Gödöllő
- Keszthely
- Miskolc
- Nagykanizsa
- Nyíregyháza
- Veszprém

=== Zone Bevásárlópark ===
- Ajka
- Budakeszi
- Dunaújváros
- Esztergom
- Kazincbarcika
- Kiskunhalas
- Pécs
- Szentes
- Szombathely

== See also ==
- List of supermarket chains in Hungary
