= Franz Colruyt =

Belgian businessman (1901–1958)

- Born: François Jean Baptiste Marie Colruyt; 14 December 1901; Lembeek, Belgium
- Died: 4 November 1958 (aged 56); Halle, Belgium
- Occupation: Businessman
- Known for: Founder of Colruyt
- Spouse: Adeline Moens (m. 1927)
- Children: Jo Colruyt
- Relatives: Jef Colruyt (grandson)

François Jean Baptiste Marie "Franz" Colruyt (14 December 1901 – 4 November 1958) was a Belgian businessman. He is known as the founder of the Colruyt family business. Under his leadership, a business in colonial goods evolved into a wholesale business in dry food.

== Early and personal life ==
Franz Colruyt was the second son in a family of 11 children. His father Joseph was a baker and had a store under the church tower of Lembeek, a borough of Halle.

Colruyt married Adeline Moens in 1927, and their son Jo was born in 1928.

== Career ==
Franz Colruyt started working with his father and delivered food to stores and large consumers. In 1928, Franz Colruyt decided to shut down the bakery and start up a wholesale business in colonial goods, such as coffee and spices. Until the war, the wholesale business mainly serves stores around Halle and Tubeke.

After WW2, the business booms and new customers are found in and around Brussels. Franz Colruyt also starts bottling wine and roasting coffee. The family business grows into a food wholesaler.

In 1950, Franz Colruyt founds the "Etablissementen Franz Colruyt nv" with a capital of 5 million francs (€125,000). His brothers Henri and Jules are also part of the business.

In the 1950s, the first mini-supermarkets and supermarkets open in Belgium. As a reaction to this, Franz Colruyt opens the Boni stores. These are run by independent shopkeepers that buy goods from Colruyt.

In 1958, his son Jo Colruyt takes over the company with his brothers. At that time, the company is already delivering to about 800 small independent stores and has about 150 employees.
