= Jo Colruyt =

Belgian businessman (1928–1994)

- Born: Joseph Alphonse Marie Colruyt; 2 August 1928; Uccle, Belgium
- Died: 6 October 1994 (aged 66); Puget-Théniers, France
- Occupation: Businessman
- Known for: CEO/Chairman of Colruyt (1958–1994)
- Children: Jef Colruyt
- Parents: Franz Colruyt (father); Adeline Moens (mother)

Joseph Alphonse Marie Colruyt (2 August 1928 – 6 October 1994) was a Belgian businessman. He was the son of Franz Colruyt, founder of the Colruyt company. Under his leadership, the company began the Colruyt retail chain known for its "lowest price" strategy. He was CEO from 1958 to 1994.

== Career ==
When Colruyt took over the company from his father Franz in 1958, the company was a dry food wholesaler. As it became more expensive to deliver small-volume orders to smaller stores, he opened the first Cash & Carry (briefly called 'Cash') in Hall in 1964: a self-service formula for independent shop keepers.

In the mid-1960s, Jo Colruyt chose to switch to retail and took over the self-service business Verloo in Ixelles/Elsene and launched his lowest prices policy, offering famous brands 10% cheaper.

This was when the struggle for efficiency, simplicity and economy typical of Colruyt stores began. At the time, the company was nearly broke. In 1976 all stores took the name Colruyt.

=== Less successful initiatives ===
At the end of the 1970s and into the early 1980s, Colruyt launched various businesses with varying success. Examples include an auto rental agency, selling wooden homes of Finlandia Hus, 'Auto Frit' mobile chip stalls and 'Green Pepper' self-service restaurants. These businesses were suspended in the mid-1980s.

=== Turnabout after crisis situation ===
In the mid-1980s the Colruyt company was almost bankrupt, competing with newcomer Aldi. From 1988 the company slowly returned to profitability. Activities included the continuation of low prices on about 300 products. In 1987 the company replaced the punched card with price labels and 'full scanning' at the cash register. Replenishment, stock management and orders were automated with bar code scanners.

=== Management ===
Colruyt introduced a horizontal corporate structure with as few managers as possible. He paid attention to employee participation and viewed training in personnel as important.

== Death ==
After over 35 years as the head of the company Jo Colruyt died in 1994. His son Jef Colruyt took over company management.

== Recognition ==
In 1992, Jo Colruyt was elected Manager of the Year by the magazine Trends.
