= Colruyt (supermarket) =

Belgian supermarket chain

Colruyt Food Retail nv

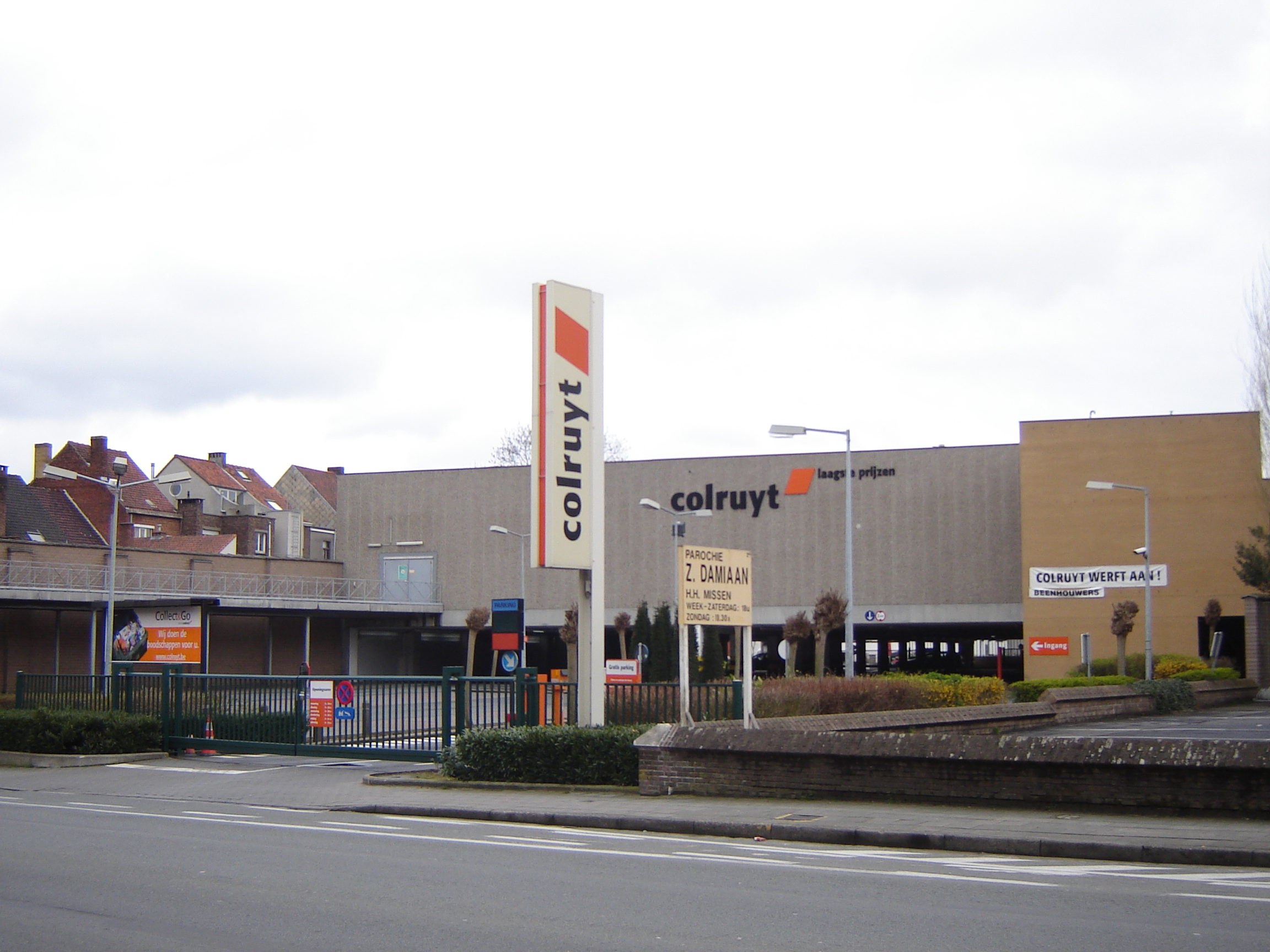
- Colruyt supermarket in Kortrijk, Belgium
- Trade name: Colruyt
- Formerly: Etablissementen Franz Colruyt nv
- Company type: Private
- Industry: Retail
- Founded: 1925; 101 years ago
- Founder: Franz Colruyt
- Headquarters: Halle, Belgium
- Number of locations: 346
- Area served: Belgium; France; Luxembourg
- Key people: Jef Colruyt, Chairman
- Products: Discount store, hypermarket/supercenter/superstore
- Revenue: ▲€5.3 billion (2012-13)
- Number of employees: 24,287
- Parent: Colruyt Group
- Website: colruyt.be

Colruyt (Dutch pronunciation: [kɔlˈrœyt]) is a Belgian supermarket chain headquartered in Halle. The current manager is Jef Colruyt.

Colruyt carries the surname of the founder of the family business, the Colruyt family, which still owns the company.

Colruyt is part of Colruyt Group, a Belgian multinational business active in wholesale distribution that evolved from the Colruyt supermarkets. It is competing with hard discounters such as Aldi and Lidl in Benelux countries where it is a well established market player. As of late 2025, Colruyt controlled 28.9% of Belgium's market share, a decline compared to its previous performance.

== History ==
In 1925, Franz Colruyt, a baker in Lembeek (near Halle), founded his own business in colonial goods (coffee, spices, etc.).

In 1950, the food wholesaler nv Ets Franz Colruyt was established; this company would eventually evolve into the Colruyt Group. In 1958, following Franz Colruyt's death, his son Jo Colruyt and his brothers took over the management of the company.

In 1994, Jo Colruyt died, and his son, Jef Colruyt, became CEO.

In 2025, Intermarché committed to taking over 81 of the 104 Colruyt stores in France for 215 million euros.

== Activities ==
The company's retail trade division includes the direct supply of products to retail customers operating through brands Colruyt, OKay, Bio-Planet, DreamLand and ColliShop, among others.

The company supplies to wholesalers and affiliated independent merchants in Belgium, France and Luxembourg. It also supplies fuels through DATS 24 filling stations in Belgium and France, provides printing and document management solutions (Druco/Mitto) and engineering activities (Intrion), and produces renewable energy (WE Power).

Between 1997 and 2026, Colruyt was also active in France. In 2025 it sold most of its active supermarkets to Les Mousquetaires, and in 2026 it permanently closed those it could not sell.
