= Profi =

Romanian supermarket chain

Profi Rom Food SRL
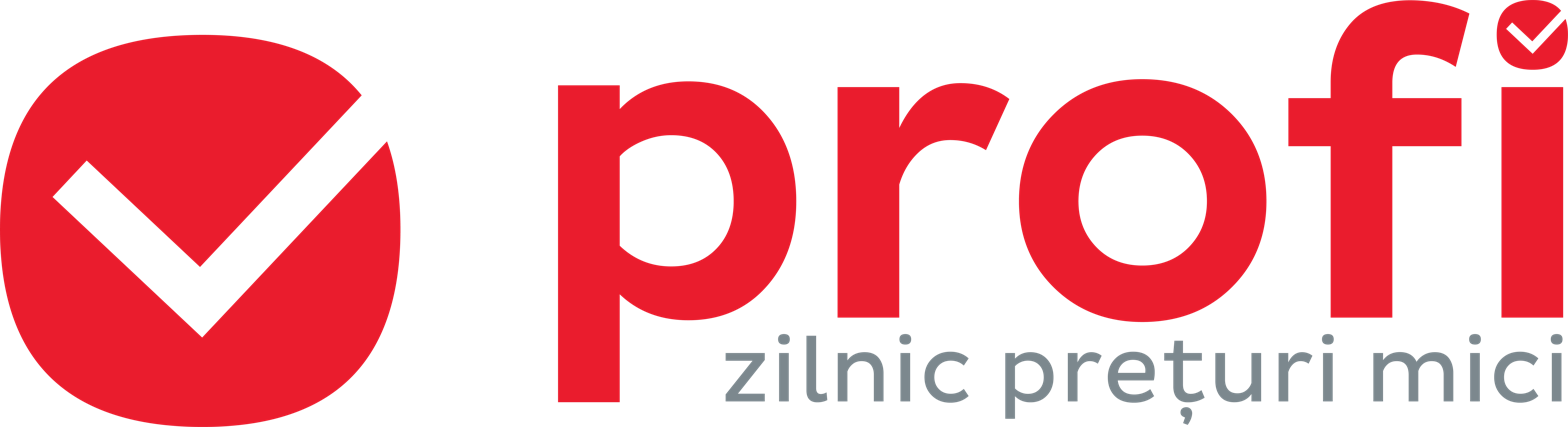
- Trade name: Profi
- Type: Private
- Industry: Retail
- Founded: 1979 (Belgium)
- Headquarters: Belgium (acquired and closed); Timișoara, Romania (currently and only)
- Number of locations: 1808
- Products: Supermarket; Convenience store
- Parent: Ahold Delhaize
- Website: www.profi.ro

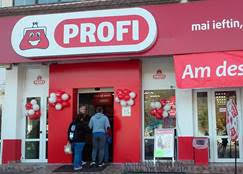
Profi supermarket in Lupeni, Romania.

Profi is a chain of supermarkets and convenience stores with 1,808 locations in Romania owned by Ahold Delhaize.

== History ==
Profi's previous logo.

=== Belgium and Luxembourg ===
Profi discount store network was founded in 1979 in Belgium by the Louis Delhaize Group. The supermarket chain consisted of 130 discount supermarkets in Belgium and Luxembourg. In 2001 to avoid the bankruptcy of chain, Louis Delhaize Group merged Profi with the Match supermarket network and began rebranding 62 supermarkets in Belgium and 14 in Luxembourg in Smatch supermarket, while the rest of the stores were closed.

=== Hungary ===
Profi entered in Hungary as the first discount supermarkets chain in 1991. The chain has developed in the eastern half of the country.

In November 2012, Louis Delhaize Group sold Match and Profi chains in Hungary. From a total of 178 supermarkets, of which 73 Profi discount supermarkets, most of them was sold to local retailers, 62 to Coop and 48 to CBA, and other 6 to Penny Market, 4 to Aldi, 2 to Pepco and 1 to Spar.

=== Romania ===
Louis Delhaize Group opened first discount supermarket in Romania on 29 June 2000, in Timișoara, Banat. The network was developed in the northwestern part of the country.

The 67 discount supermarkets operated in Romania were bought in 2009 and further developed into a nationwide supermarket chain by Polish Enterprise Fund VI (PEF VI), a private equity fund administered by Enterprise Investors (EI).

Since 2010, the chain began a rapid growth nationwide. In 2013, the chain opened the first convenience stores under the brand Profi City. In the rural areas (and some towns) were opened supermarkets and from 2015 local shops under the brand Profi Loco. At the end of 2016, before the sale, the network reached 500 locations.

In November 2016, Profi was bought by the investing group MEP Retail Investments, part of the Mid Europa Partners, for €533 million. Profi network reached 1000 locations on May 17, 2019.

In 2022, Profi reached 1600 stores, of which 800 in Agent management.

On October 30, 2023, Ahold Delhaize reached an agreement with Mid Europa Partners to purchase the Profi stores for €1.3 billion.
