= Match (supermarket) =

Belgian multinational supermarket chain

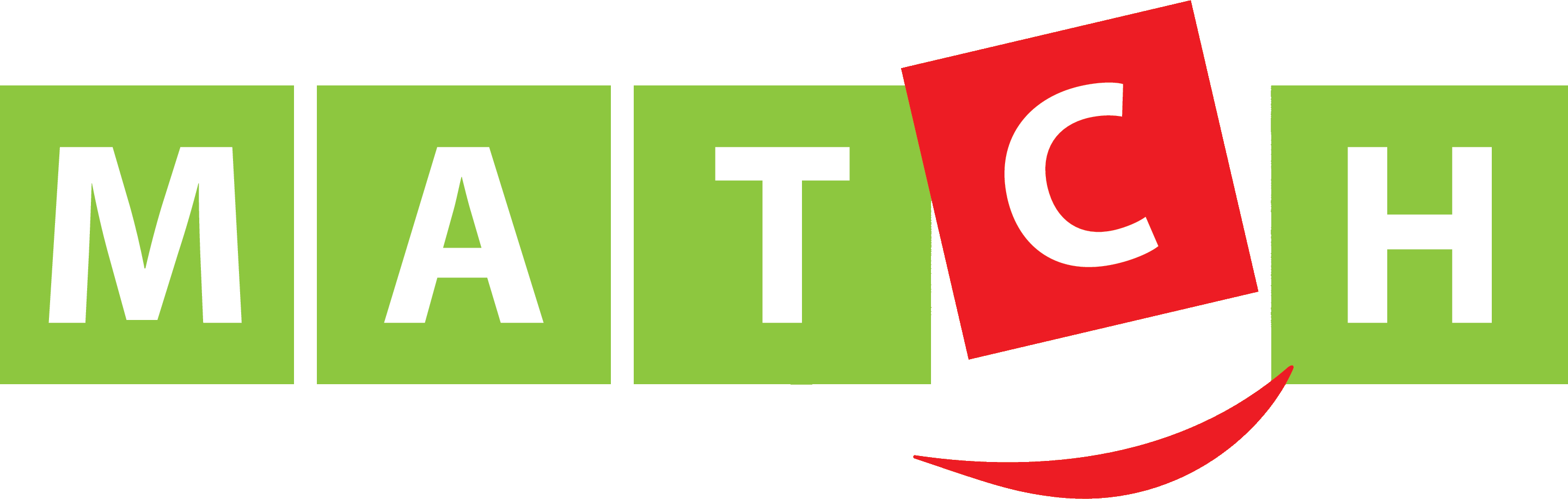
- Logo used in Belgium and Luxembourg since 2013
- Company type: Société anonyme
- Industry: Retail
- Founded: 1934; 92 years ago
- Defunct: 2012 (Hungary) 2024
- Fate: Sold, Interrogated into CBA Príma (Hungary)
- Headquarters: Fleurus, Belgium
- Area served: Belgium, Luxembourg, Hungary and northeast France
- Products: Supermarkets
- Website: www.supermarchesmatch.com

Match is a Belgian multinational chain of supermarkets owned by Louis Delhaize Group. As 2023, the supermarket chain is present with 77 supermarkets in Belgium, 115 in northeast France and 25 in Luxembourg. The network also includes Smatch supermarkets in Belgium and Luxembourg.

Louis Delhaize Group, which owns Cora, Match and Smatch supermarkets, announced in 2023 that it will exit from food retail by selling activities in Belgium to Colruyt, in Luxembourg to E.Leclerc and in France to Carrefour.

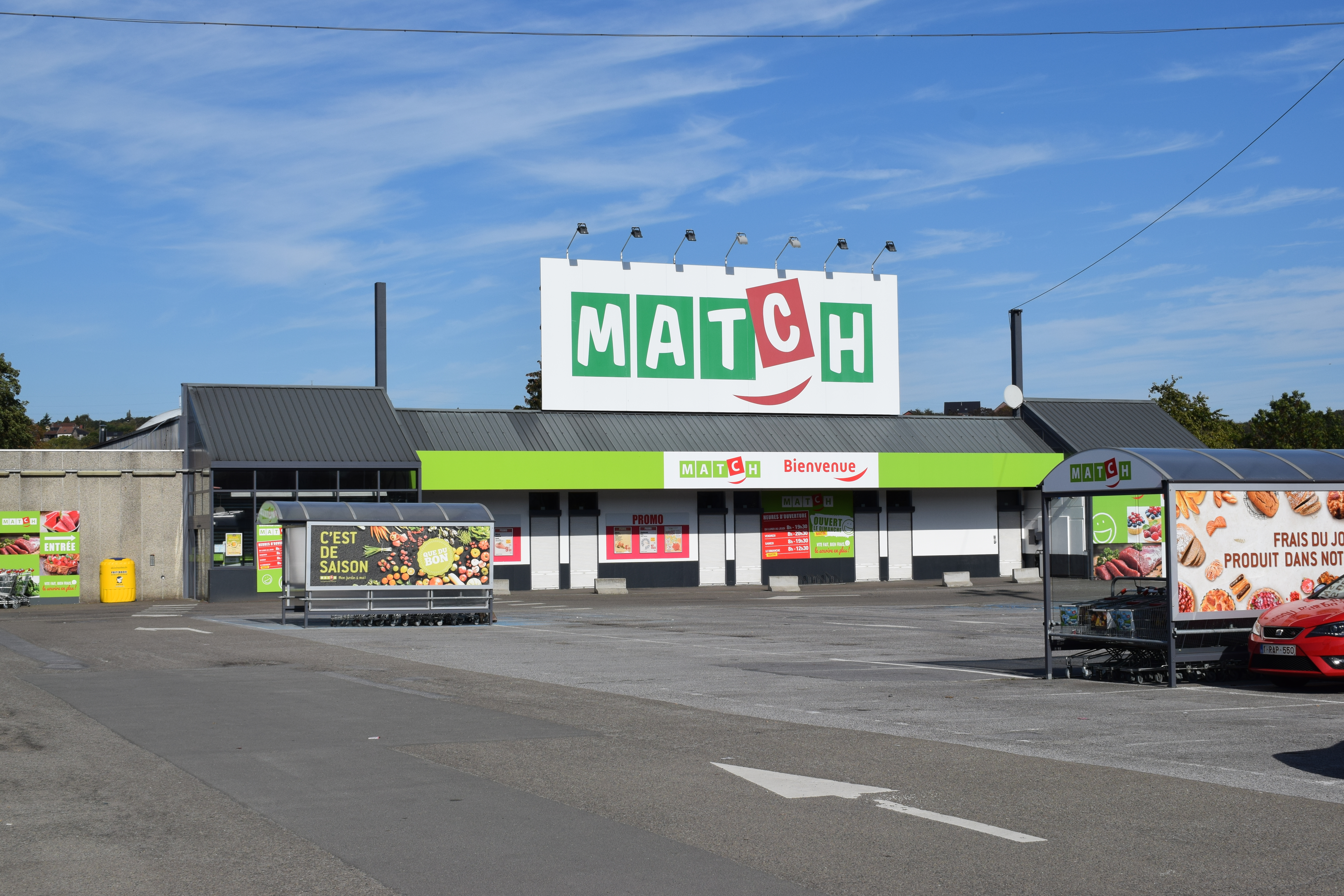
Match supermarket in Andenne, Belgium

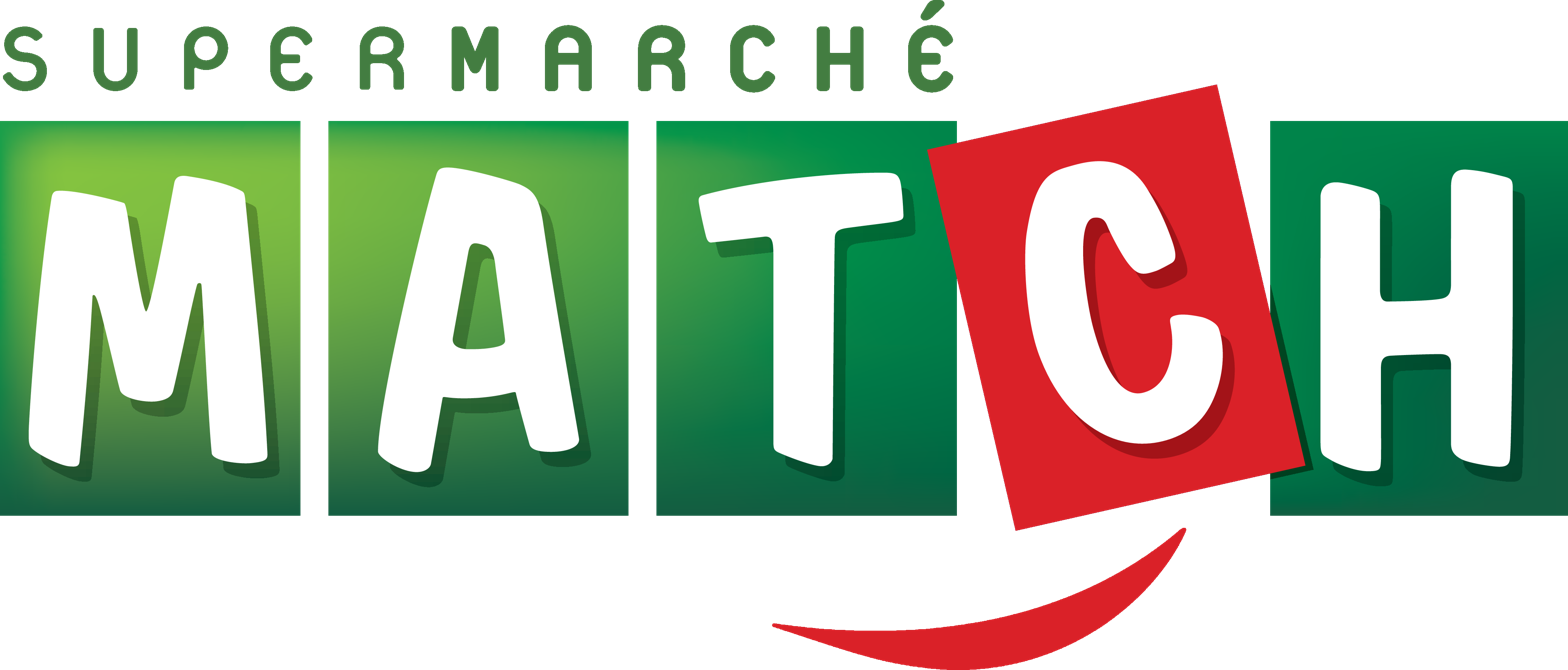
Previous slightly modified Match logo, still used in France

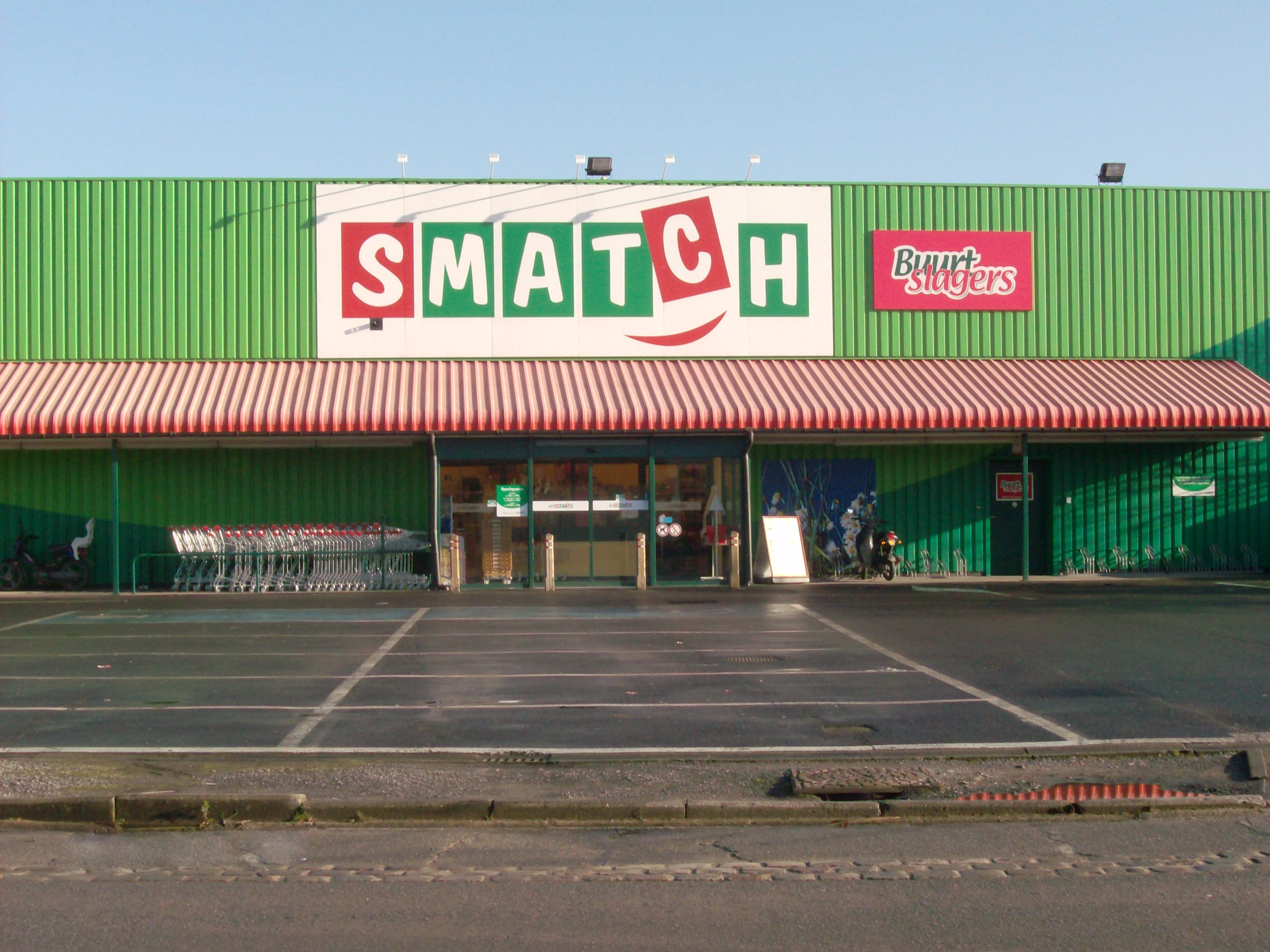
Smatch supermarket in Lokeren, Belgium

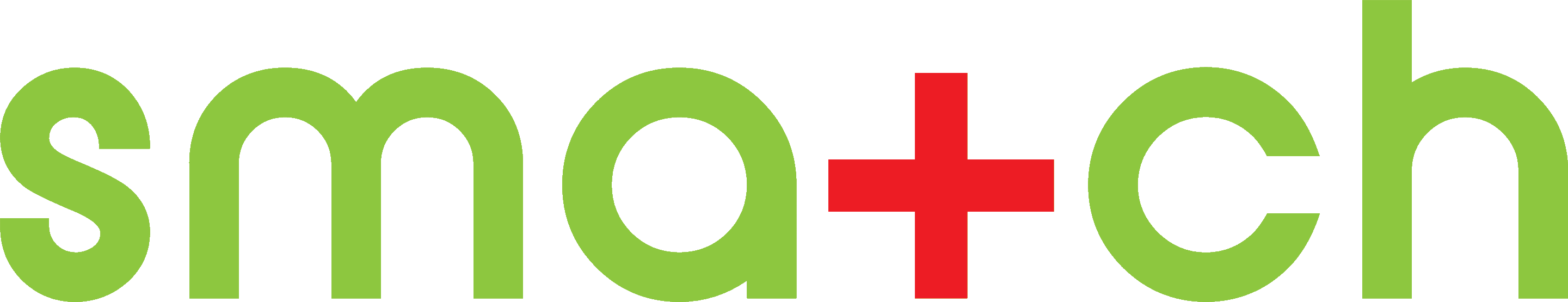
Latest Smatch logo

== History ==
The supermarket chain was founded for the first time in Belgium in 1934. In April 1977, Louis Delhaize Group took over the Match self-service, previously controlled by the Courthéoux group.

=== Belgium ===
In 1976, SA Louis Delhaize had 25 supermarkets in Belgium in the following locations: twelve in Hainaut, five in Namur, four in Brabant (including one in Brussels and three in Walloon Brabant), three in Liège and one in Limburg. After the purchase of Match in 1977 from the Courthéoux group, all supermarkets were renamed Match.

After expanding to Luxembourg and France, a major restructuring took place at the local branch in 1994.

In 2001, Match took over the management of the group's 130 Profi discount supermarkets. Approximately half were closed, the others being rebranded as Smatch small local supermarkets, with average sales areas of 400-500 square meters. The company that operates Smatch supermarkets has been kept under its legal name S.A. Profi.

The number of Match and Smatch supermarkets in Belgium was 111 in 2019. Due to the losses recorded over the years, Loui Delhaize Group started closing stores. In September 2019, the closure of 16 stores was announced, including seven Match supermarkets and 9 Smatch supermarkets. In 2022, a new concept was launched through the remodeling and rebranding of some supermarkets as Louis Delhaize Open Market. These were later rebranded back to Match.

On 22 September 2023 it was announced that 57 of the 77 Belgian Match and Smatch supermarkets would be sold to Colruyt, and the remaining ones would be closed with 690 jobs to be lost as a result of the closures.

=== Luxembourg ===
The first Match supermarket opened in 1974 in a shopping center in Helfent, which is in the municipality of Bertrange. In 2001, the group's other 14 Profi discount supermarkets were taken under the management of Match and later rebranded as Smatch still being operated by SA Profilux company.

As of 2022, Match had 753 employers in Luxembourg in a warehouse and 25 supermarkets operating, 12 as Match and 13 as Smatch.

At the end of July 2023, Louis Delhaize Group announced the sale of all of the group's Luxembourg activities, including Cora, Match and Smatch stores to French retailer E.Leclerc, which marks its entry into the market.

=== France ===
Match subsidiary in France was preceded by the founding of the three companies Docks du Nord in Lille in northern France, Sanal in Nancy and Sadal in Strasbourg by the Belgian Delhaize family in 1908. In 1960, the first supermarket was built in the north of the country. In 1978, the Docks du Nord company became Fraismarché Gro and expanded with the supermarket concept. Match supermarket chain was born in France in 1990, when all supermarkets in Alsace, Lorraine and the northeast of the country, which had previously had different names, were brought together.

There were branches in the Antilles until the beginning of 2010. The seven branches in Guadeloupe were sold and rebranded to Super U on 8 January 2010. The 150th supermarket was opened in Beauvais in June 2012. Eleven unprofitable branches, were closed in May and June 2015, and the number of branches decreased to 129 stores. In 2022, the group operated 115 stores in 14 departments in the northeast of the country, four warehouses with a net profit of 16.4 million euros.

On 13 July 2023 Louis Delhaize Group announced the sale of all French food retail activities, including 55 Cora and 77 Match supermarkets for €1.05 billion to the former franchisor Carrefour.

=== Hungary ===
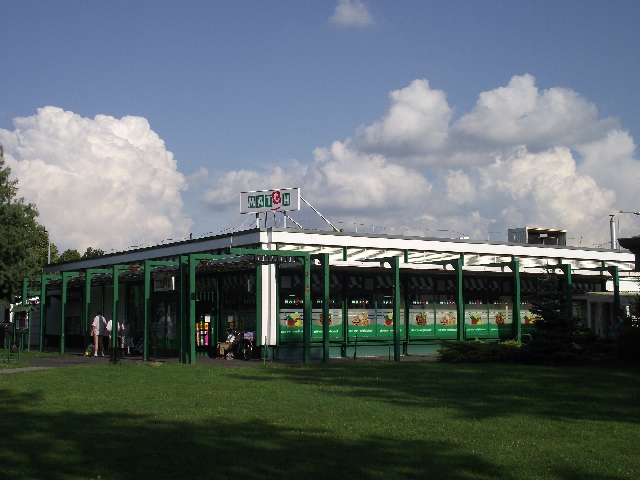
Match in Bük, Hungary

In 1952, the Csemege retail chain was founded in Hungary, but during 1991 the state-run Csemege was bought by Julius Meinl. In 1999, the Belgian Louis Delhaize Group bought up the Csemege-Julius Meinl group. The company was first renamed Csemege Szupermarketek, and then was renamed again as Csemege-Match Group.

In 2000, the Match and Smatch brands were introduced to the Hungarian retail market. During 2004, the Smatch brand was rebranded as Match supermarkets.

In 2012 local retailers CBA and Coop bought most Match supermarkets, which were rebranded as CBA Supermarkets in Budapest, and rebranded as Coop in other towns.
