= Jef Colruyt =

Belgian businessman (born 1958)

- Born: Jozef Maria Damiaan Colruyt; 18 October 1958 (age 67); Halle, Belgium
- Occupation: Businessman
- Known for: CEO (1994–2023) and chairman (1994–present) of Colruyt
- Parent: Jo Colruyt (father)
- Relatives: Franz Colruyt (grandfather)

Jozef Maria Damiaan "Jef", Baron Colruyt (born 18 October 1958, Halle) is a Belgian businessman. In 1994, he succeeded his father Jo Colruyt as head of Colruyt, which was founded by his grandfather Franz Colruyt. With an estimated fortune of 2.521 billion euro, he is one of the wealthiest people of Belgium.

== Career ==
After his studies, Jef Colruyt became a representative at Dexion in 1985, a German company for logistic systems. In 1986 and 1987 he was a representative at Marchal Systems, a company for chemical pumps.

In 1987, Jef Colruyt started working in the family business.

When his father Jo Colruyt died unexpectedly in 1994, Jef Colruyt took over the operational management of the company at 36 years old. Under his leadership, the French market was entered into and new store formulas were developed, such as the local shop OKay, baby specialist DreamBaby, toys and gaming specialist DreamLand and the organic supermarket Bio-Planet. In 2003, Spar was also added to this.

Under the leadership of Jef Colruyt, Colruyt Group also started to pay more attention to sustainable entrepreneurship and social responsibility projects. The Collibri foundation for education, the transport charter, the charter concerning child labour and working conditions are examples of this. Also the participation in the wind farm Northwind is testimony to this.

In 2023, Jef Colruyt stepped down as CEO after almost 30 years, but remained as chairman; Stefan Goethaert became Colruyt's new CEO.

== Personal life ==
Jef is the son of Jo Colruyt and grandson of Franz Colruyt, the founder of the Colruyt company. He was elected Manager of the Year by Trends magazine in 2002, ten years after his father Jo.

Jef Colruyt was made honorary citizen of the municipality of Beersel in 2008. In 2012, he was ennobled by King Albert II of Belgium. Since then, he may call himself baron.

Jef Colruyt is highly interested in spirituality and eastern philosophies. He is also a passionate painter.

After a heart attack in 2007, he went to a Hindu monastery in Bali to revitalise body and mind.

== Sources ==
- A Belgian Family Business
- De rijkste families in Vlaams-Brabant

Belgian nobility
New creation	Baron Colruyt; 2012–	Incumbent
