= Colruyt family =

Belgian noble family

The Colruyt family is a Belgian noble family, belonging to the wealthiest noble houses of Belgium. In three generations, they managed to climb to the top of the Belgian economy.

== History ==
The history starts in 1925 when Franz, a baker in Lembeek, opened his own business. He was the second son in a Catholic family of 11 children. Two of them became diocesan priests, and Camille became a famous artist specialised in Religious artifacts.

The family business still reflects his vision. The management of the family created financial success, in the last quarter of the 20th century the small family business developed into a big company. In 1972 by request of the family, the demolition of Lembeek Castle was accepted by the local politicians. The space was used for the expansion of the company.

Today the Colruyt family is among the most powerful families of Belgium.

Jozef was ennobled by King Albert II in 2012.

== Genealogy ==
Jean Joseph Andre Colruyt (1868–1942), baker from Lembeek x Josephine-Marie Vanboerck.

  1. Joseph Marie Léonard Colruyt, (1900–1986): Artist, painter.
  2. François Jean Baptiste Marie Colruyt,(1901–1958):
    married in 1927 to Adeline Alphonsine Marie Moens.
    1. Joseph Alphonse Marie Colruyt, (1928–1994): married in 1953 to Rita De Man.
      1. Jozef Maria, 1st Baron Colruyt, created by King Albert II.
  3. Gustaaf Maria Veroon Colruyt,(1903–1970):
    Honorary Canon of the Metropolitain Chapter of saint-Rumbold.
  4. Camille Henri Veroon Colruyt, (1908–1973): Sculptor and fabricant of Religious art and Orvebrerie.
  5. Andre Jan Maria Colruyt, (1910–1974):
    Catholic Priest, archdiocese of Mechelen.
