= Louis Delhaize Group =

Belgian retail group

- Company type: Public
- Industry: Retail
- Founded: 1875; 151 years ago
- Headquarters: Charleroi, Hainaut, Belgium
- Key people: Jacques Bouriez, CEO
- Products: Hypermarkets, Grocery Stores, Discount Stores, and more
- Revenue: ▲€ 9 billion (2021)

The Louis Delhaize Group is a Belgian-French retail group established in 1875 by Louis Delhaize. The principal activity is the operation of food supermarkets and hypermarkets in Belgium, France, Luxembourg and Romania.

On February 23, 2022, Louis Delhaize Group announced the renovation of all Match and Smatch banners in Belgium, scheduled to take place between 2022 and 2025, and the phasing out of the banners in favor of Louis Delhaize for Smatch and Louis Delhaize Open Market for Match.

== History ==
On 12 July 2023, Alexandre Bompard, CEO of the Carrefour Group, announced the acquisition from the Louis Delhaize Group of 60 Cora hypermarkets and 115 Match supermarkets in France. A few days later, the Louis Delhaize Group announced the sale of the Cora, Match, and Smatch supermarkets in Luxembourg to E.Leclerc.

== Structure ==
- Cora (hypermarket)
- Match (supermarket)
- Smatch (small size Match shops)
- Delitraiteur
- Dod (Delitraiteur in France)
- Louis Delhaize, (grocery chain, dating back to 1875)

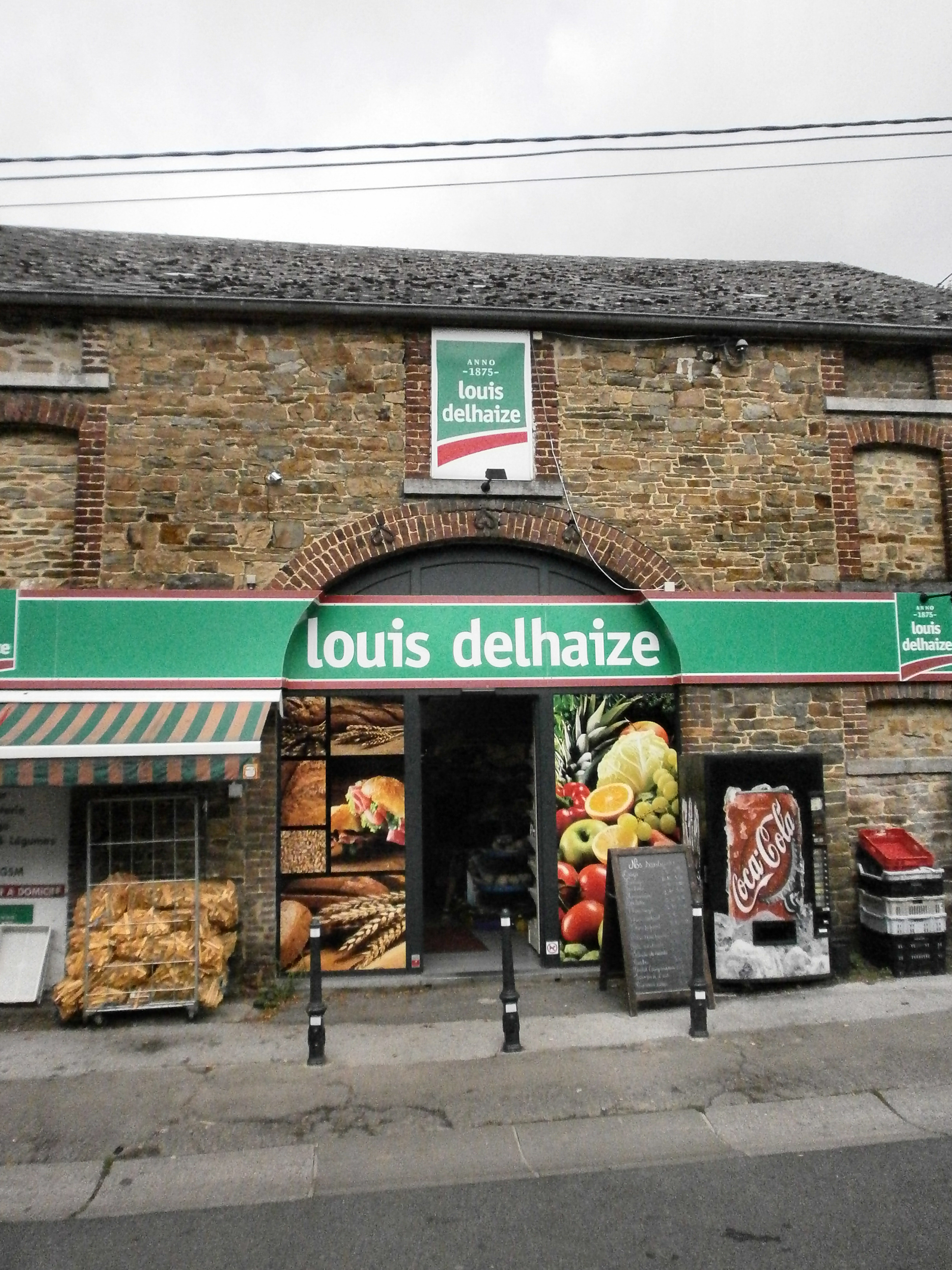
Store of Louis Delhaize in Belgium

- Profi (supermarket / formerly hard-discount, sold in 2009, Romania and was closed in 2012, Hungary)
- Ecomax (hard-discount)
- Truffaut (garden)
- Houra.fr (online store)
- Animalis (animals)
- Cora Voyages (travel agency)
