= Lembeek =

Village in Halle, Belgium

Coordinates: 50°43′N 4°13′E

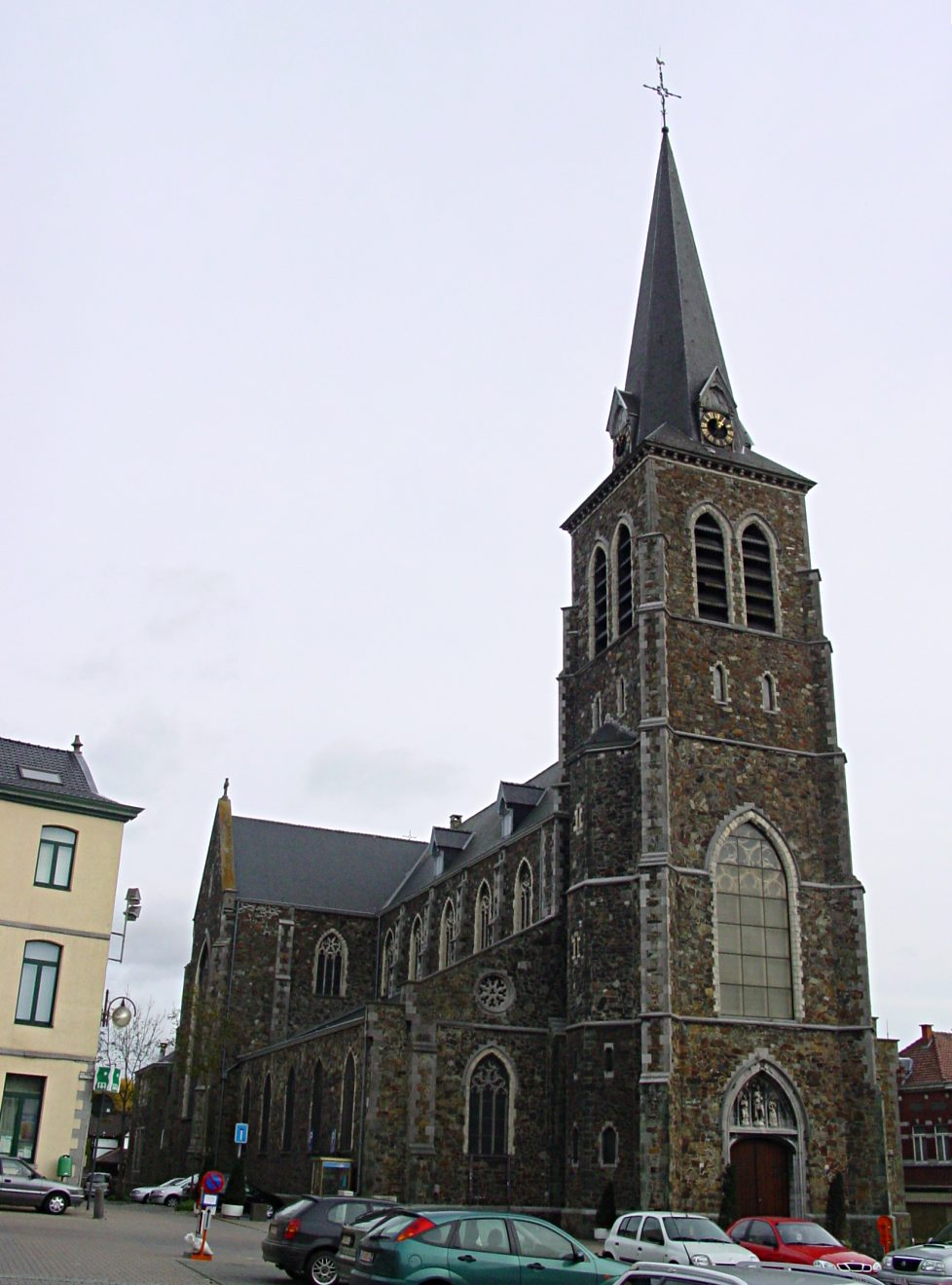
Church of Saint Veronus in Lembeek

Lembeek is a village with a population of 7,256 in the municipality of Halle, Belgium.

== Location ==
South-west of Halle, it is close to the language border between the Flemish Region and Wallonia. The Castle of Lembeek was demolished by request of the Colruyt family.

Boon Brewery is based in Lembeek. The village has a railway station, and is next to the Brussels-Charleroi Canal.

== See also ==
- Veronus of Lembeek
