= Coop (Hungary) =

Hungarian supermarket chain and buying group

CO-OP Hungary Zrt.
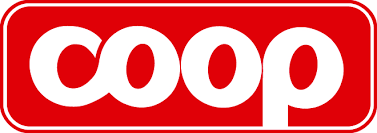
- Company type: Private
- Predecessor: ÁFÉSZ
- Founded: 1995
- Headquarters: Budapest, Hungary
- Products: Grocery, general merchandise
- Number of employees: 32,000
- Website: coop.hu

Coop is a Hungarian supermarket chain and buying group with about 5000 stores, mostly in villages and suburban towns. In 2015, it became the second largest retail chain in Hungary.
