= Cora (hypermarket) =

Belgian hypermarket chain

Cora SA
- Company type: Private company, SA
- Industry: Retail
- Founded: 1974, Belgium
- Defunct: 2012 (Hungary); 2024 (France, Luxembourg and Romania); 2026 (Belgium)
- Headquarters: Jumet, Belgium
- Area served: Belgium
- Key people: Philippe Bouriez
- Products: Hypermarkets
- Parent: Louis Delhaize
- Website: www.cora.be

Cora was a chain of hypermarkets owned by Louis Delhaize Group in Belgium, having previously also had hypermarkets in France, Hungary, Luxembourg and Romania. Cora was founded in 1974 by the supermarket holding Louis Delhaize Group, after taking over three Carrefour hypermarkets located in Belgium. These three were originally established around 1969 as a joint venture franchise between two other companies: the Carrefour Group and the Delhaize Group.

The Louis Delhaize Group also included the supermarket chain Match, the online supermarket Houra, the Truffaut garden center chain and the Animalis pet shop chain. The name 'Cora' is borrowed from the Greek goddess Persephone (Roman: Proserpina) who is also known as Cora.

Formerly, Cora had hypermarkets in Hungary, but in 2011 the stores were sold to Auchan and handed to them by summer 2012. Similarly, the Romanian stores were bought by Carrefour in October 2023. In 2024 E.Leclerc bought all Cora and Smatch stores in Luxembourg. In 2023 Carrefour bought all Cora and Smatch stores in France for 1 billion €. Carrefour finalized the acquisition of Cora and Smatch stores from Louis Delhaize in July 2024. Carrefour products are now available in Cora and Smatch. Starting from September 2024 to November 2024 Carrefour put all Cora Hypermarkets under the Carrefour banner in France.

In April 2025, Cora announced that it would close its only remaining hypermarkets (seven, all in Belgium) on 31 January 2026.
