= Colruyt Group =

Belgian retail corporation

Colruyt Group nv
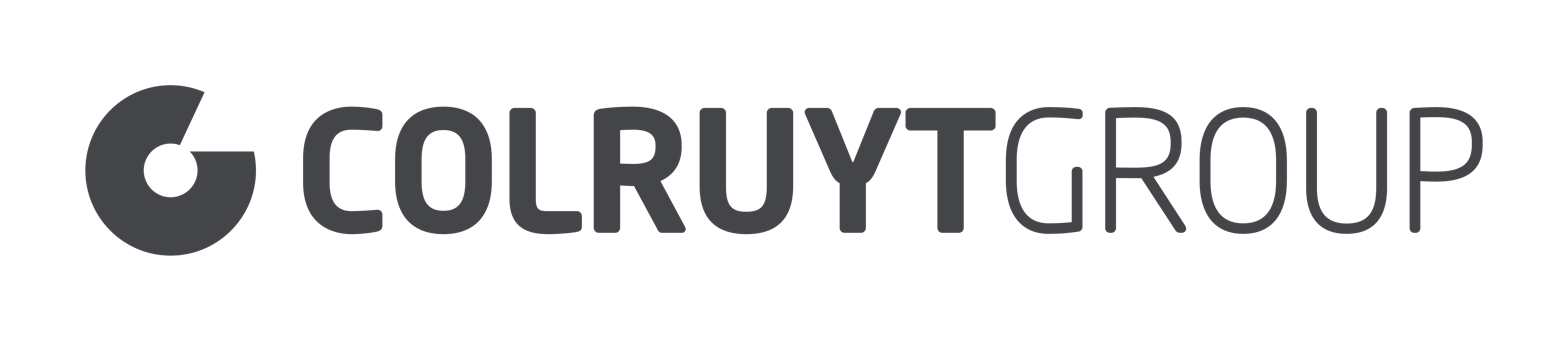

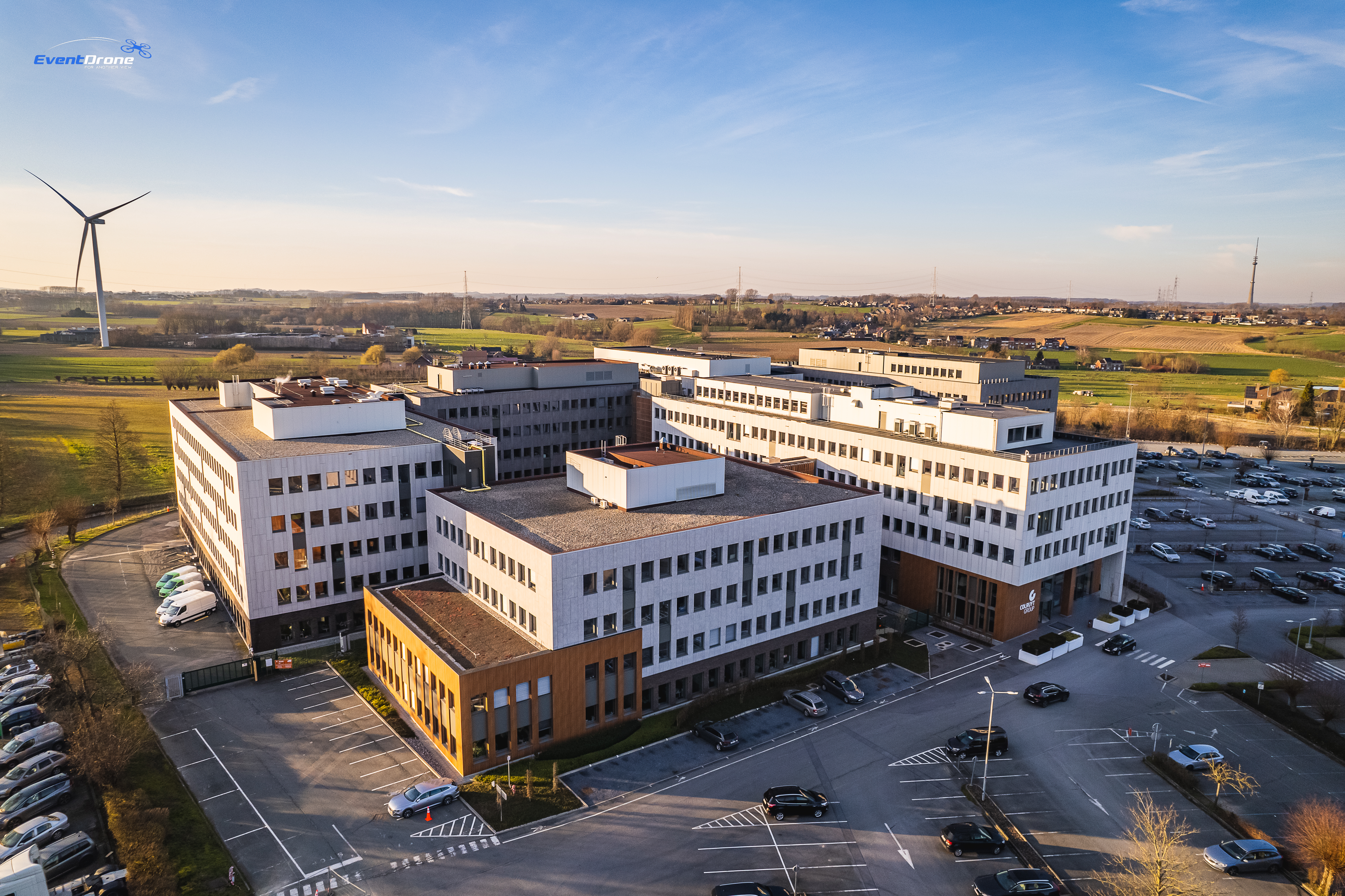
- Wilgenveld: Colruyt Group’s headquarters in Halle
- Formerly: Etablissementen Franz Colruyt N.V.
- Company type: Private
- Traded as: Euronext Brussels: COLR
- Industry: Retail
- Founded: 1928
- Founder: Franz Colruyt
- Headquarters: Edingensesteenweg 196; Halle, Belgium
- Key people: Stefan Goethaert (Executive); Jef Colruyt (Chairman)
- Services: Distribution
- Revenue: €10.820 billion (2022-2023)
- Net income: €201 million (2022-2023)
- Website: www.colruytgroup.com

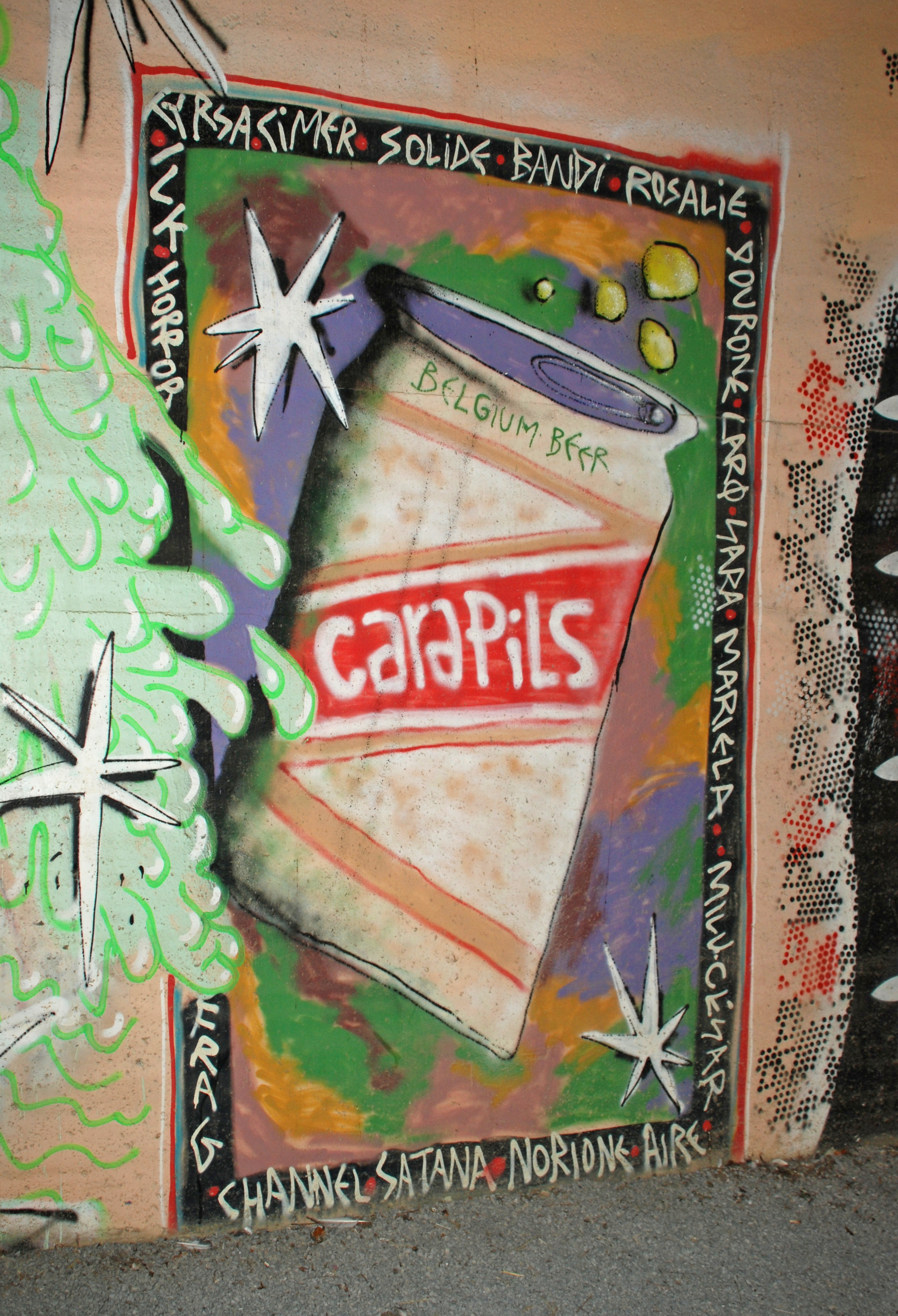
Cara, a brand of Colruyt, illustrated here by a can of Pils on a mural of the railway station of Louvain-la-Neuve (Belgium).

Colruyt Group is a Belgian family-owned retail corporation that is managing the Colruyt supermarkets and other subsidiaries such as OKay, Bio-Planet, DATS 24, Spar, and more.

Founded in 1928 by Franz Colruyt, the group today is most significantly known for its eponymous discount supermarket chain, which is one of the major players in especially Belgium. Colruyt Group is headquartered in the city of Halle and has operations in Belgium, France and Luxembourg.

== Operations ==
The group's main business is its Colruyt discount supermarket stores, with over 220 locations in Belgium. The brand competes directly with discount retailers such as Aldi and Lidl. Other food retail brands operated by the company include the grocery store chain OKay and the organic supermarket Bio-Planet. Colruyt is also one of two franchisees of the SPAR brand in Belgium. In France Colruyt operates its eponymous chain and also supplies the Coccinelle chain of supermarkets.

=== List of subsidiaries ===
- Colruyt supermarkets - Belgium
- Colruyt France - supermarkets
- Colruyt Group Services (IT - work simplification - BPM - Marketing - Technics - ...)
- Bio-Planet - Bio (organic) supermarkets
- Colex - Colruyt Export: export of products to Africa, South America, ...
- Collect&Go - online grocery shopping
- ColliShop - e-shop non-food
- Cru - delicacies markets
- DATS 24 - gas stations
- DreamBaby - children apparel
- DreamLand - toy and gift shops
- Eoly (sustainable energy supplier)
- OKay - grocery stores
- Retail Partners Colruyt Group (franchising)
- Solucious - wholesale
- Symeta (formerly Druco) - printing company
- ZEB - fashion apparel store

== Milestones ==
- 1960: purchase of IBM 360-20 to process the famous punch cards as the first supermarket in Belgium.
- 1960s: start of the lowest prices policy with Discount Verloo.
- 1971: opening of the first unmanned DATS 24-hour filling station in Belgium.
- 1987: first company in Belgium to use ‘full scanning’, a barcode on the product to automate replenishment, stock management and orders.
- 1990s: food safety in the light of the dioxin affair. The company suggested to draw up specifications with requirements for suppliers, which were later also used by other distributors.
- 2000: Collect&Go offers Colruyt’s food assortment online.
- 2011: pursuit of animal welfare. No more meat from castrated pigs is sold in the group’s stores since early 2011. Later, other supermarkets like Delhaize and Lidl followed suit, urged on by the Global Action in the Interest of Animals (GAIA), a Belgian organisation for animal welfare.
- 2011: the group introduces Colruyt Group Academy, which customers and employees can attend for all kinds of activities. Today, there are ten Academies.
- 2014: launch of new store concept Cru.
- 2016: Colruyt Group becomes ambassador of the United Nations Sustainable Development Goals.
- 2017: launch of Xtra as a common customer loyalty card and app for Colruyt Group’s stores and webshops.
- 2017: DATS 24 opens the first green hydrogen refuelling station for the general public in Halle.
- 2021: launch of the Eco-score.
- 2021: acquisition of fitness chain Jims.
- 2022: Belgium’s largest online pharmacy Newpharma becomes an integral part of Colruyt Group.
- 2023: acquisition of Degrenne Distribution group in France.
- 2023: energy holding company Virya Energy sells its offshore wind power platform Parkwind to Japanese energy group JERA Green.
- 2023: agreement with Belgian family business ToyChamp on the sale of 75% of Dreamland’s shares.
- 2023: sale of fuel specialist DATS 24 to Virya Energy.
- 2023: Colruyt Group acquires a stake in digital health platform yoboo.
- 2023: Jef Colruyt retires as CEO and hands over to the new CEO Stefan Goethaert.
- 2023: agreement to acquire 57 Match and Smatch stores in Belgium.
- 2025: The group is considering leaving France, a country where it operates 101 stores.
