= CBA (food retail) =

Hungarian supermarket chain

CBA Kereskedelmi Kft.
- Type: Private
- Founded: 1992; 34 years ago
- Headquarters: Alsónémedi; Hungary
- Key people: Founder/president: László Baldauf; CEO: Dr. Zsolt Jasku
- Products: Grocery; general merchandise
- Number of employees: 30,000
- Website: cba.hu

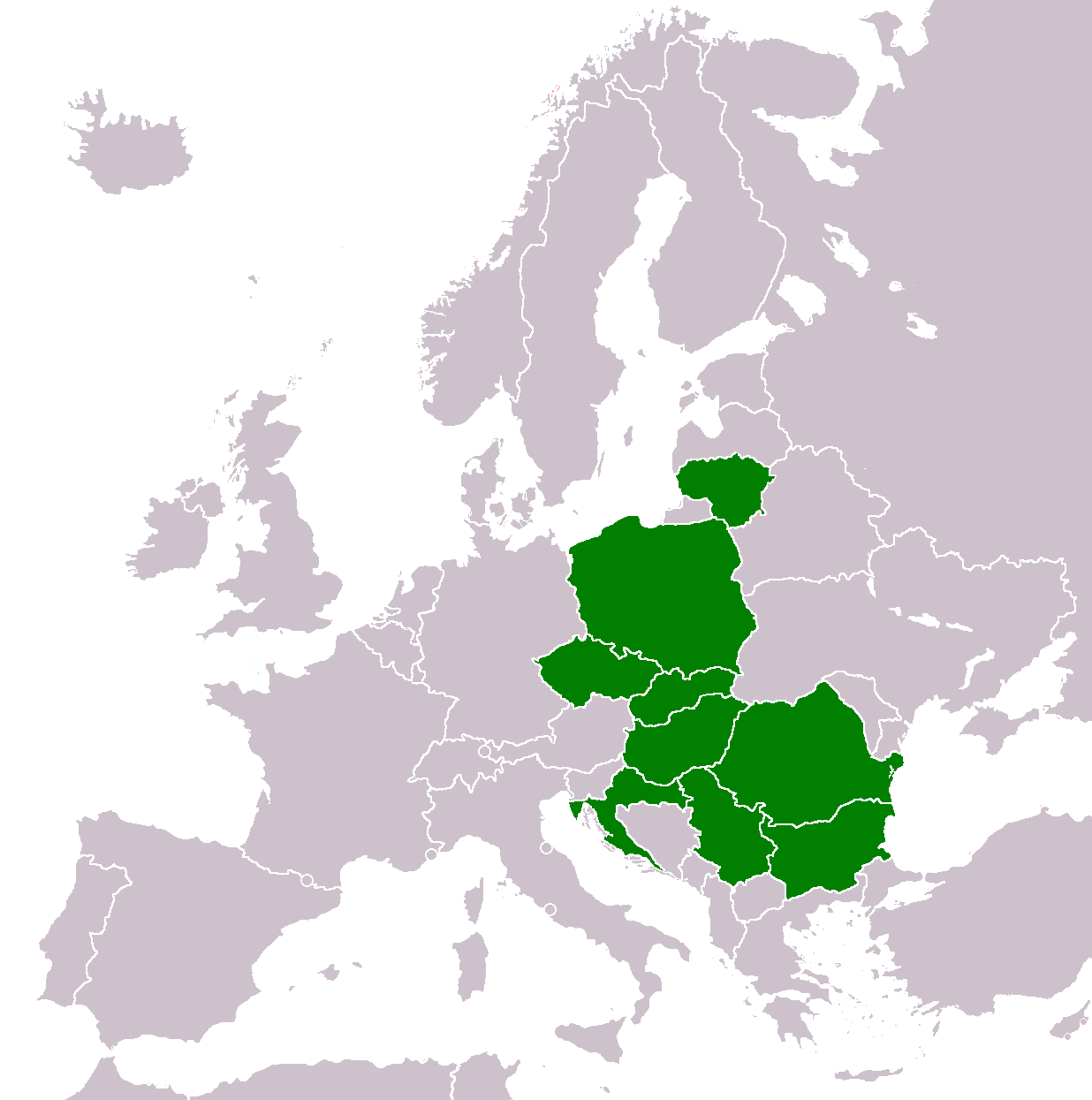
Countries with CBA stores

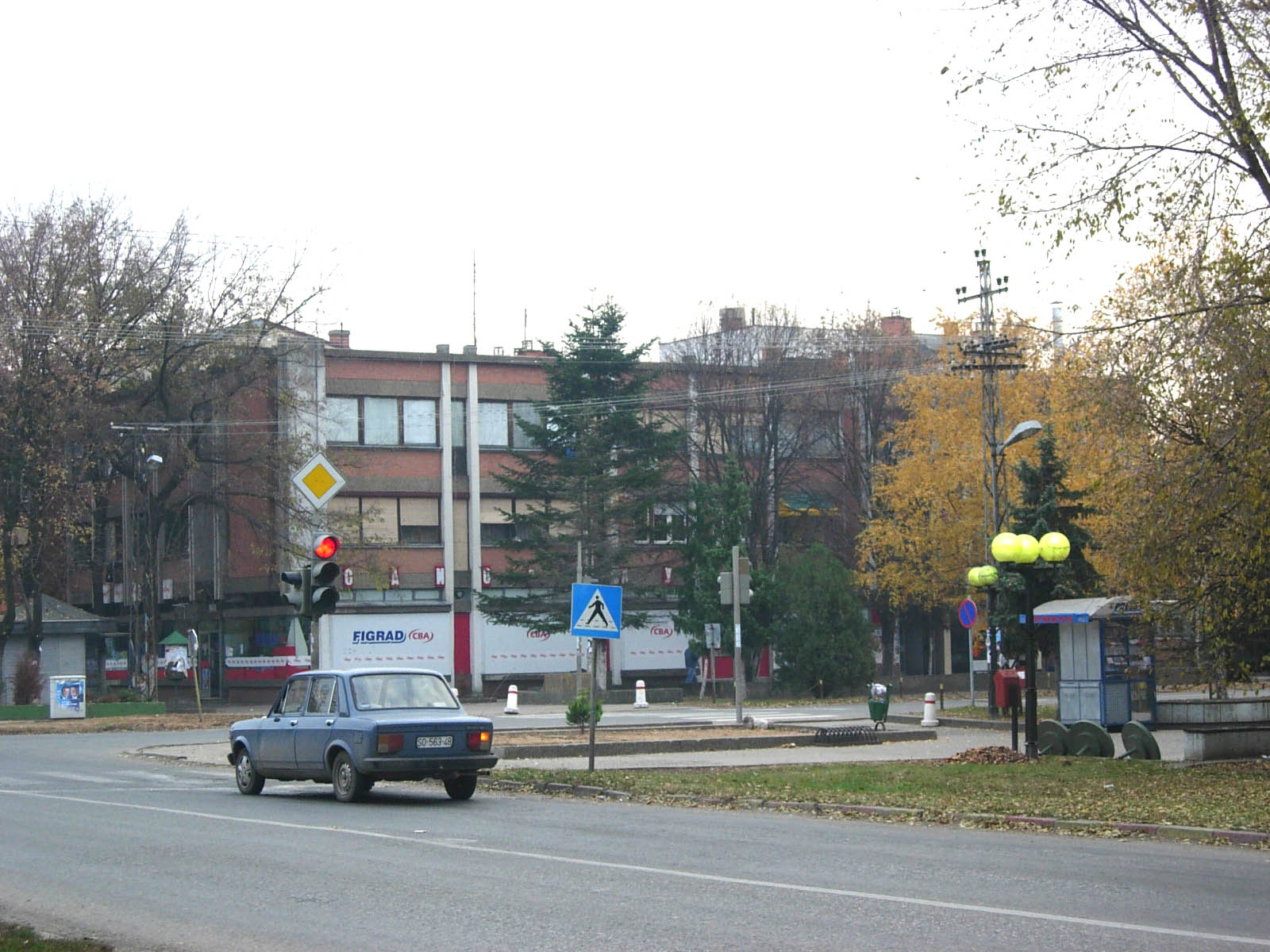
Figrad CBA store in the town center of Crvenka, Serbia

CBA is a Hungarian supermarket chain with almost 5,200 stores. It operates in Bulgaria, Lithuania, Czech Republic, Croatia, Hungary, Poland, Romania, Serbia and Slovakia.

There were 134 stores in Hungary in February 2018.

Most CBA stores have grill bars, bakeries, butcher's and wine shops. A discount store is also available (CBA Cent) and a hypermarket (Príma).

== History ==
In 1992, CBA was formed of 17 grocery stores from 10 private owners in Hungary. Stores elsewhere in the country were only opened years later. In 1998, 80% of CBA stores were outside Budapest. Because of difficulties with delivering, CBA opened regional headquarters. In 2005, CBA opened its first logistic center in Alsónémedi. From that year, CBA became a franchise system. In 2009, CBA created two new store formats: CBA Príma (later simply Príma) and CBA Cent. CBA Príma aims to represent the premium category and high quality. Its slogan is: “Premium quality at an affordable price.” CBA Cent strives to offer the quality of other foreign discount chains at a lower price. The very first Cent store opened on 12 November 2009 in Mogyoród. Its slogan is: “CBA Cent – When every penny counts.” In contrast to the Príma stores, CBA Cent stores disappeared from the domestic market by 2019. Most of the stores were converted into Príma locations or transferred to another retail chain.

== Kasszás Erzsi and Icuka ==
During 2017, CBA released a commercial in Hungary featuring Kasszás Erzsi (Cashier Erzsi) (played by Andrea Balázs), a woman who works as a cashier. In the commercial, Erzsi sang about working in CBA. She appeared in every commercial until 2018 and became so famous that CBA made a tour with her around the country. Fans could meet Erzsi in selected CBA stores. In 2018, Erzsi was replaced by Icuka, a shop manager (Szilvia Bach) who sings in rap.
