= No frills =

Marketing concept

A no-frills or no frills service or product is one for which the non-essential features have been removed to keep the price low. The term "frills" originally refers to a style of fabric decoration. Something offered to customers for no additional charge may be designated as a "frill" – for example, free drinks on airline journeys, or a radio installed in a rental car. No-frills businesses operate on the principle that by removing luxurious additions, customers may be offered lower prices.

Common products and services for which no-frills brands exist include budget airlines, supermarkets, vacations and used vehicles.

== Airlines ==
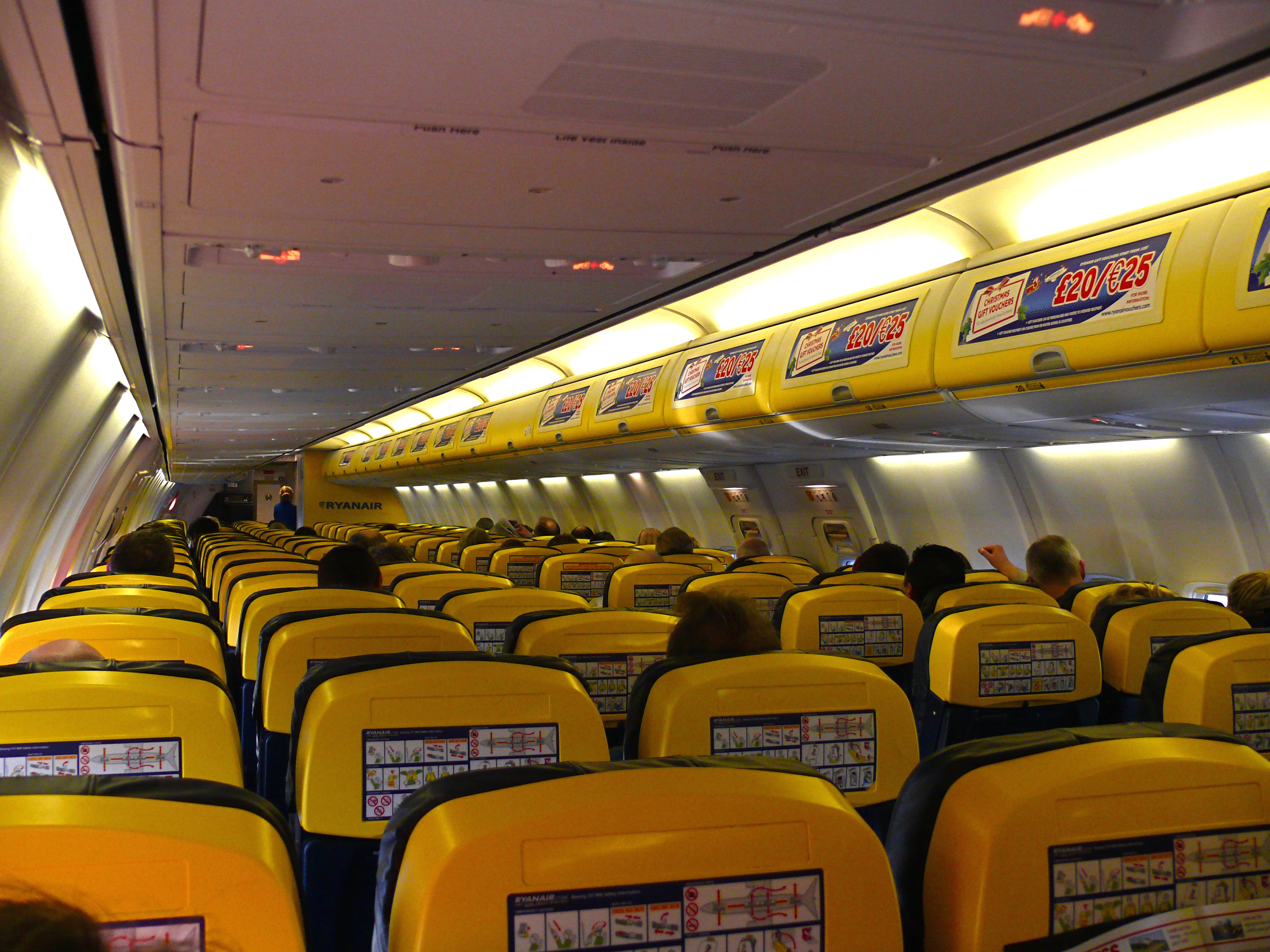
Interior of a Ryanair no-frills aircraft

No-frills airlines are airlines that offer low fares but eliminate all non-essential services, such as complimentary food, in-flight entertainment systems, and business-class seating. A no-frills airline will typically cut overhead by flying from more remote airports (with lower access charges) and by using a single type of aircraft. Aircraft cabin interiors may be fitted out with minimum comforts, dispensing with luxuries such as seat-back video screens, reclining seats and blinds; some airlines choose to carry advertising inside the cabin to increase revenue. Should meals be served, they must be paid for in full.

Some airlines also extend the definition of "frills" to include standard services and conveniences; for example, a no-frills airline may charge passengers an additional fee for check-in luggage, using airport check-in desks, or even providing wheelchairs.

== Automobiles ==
In the United States, a no-frills automobile model typically has a minimum of convenience equipment, a less powerful engine and spartan trim.

Frequently, these models represent the lowest-priced version of a larger selection of more lavishly equipped and trimmed models of that same car. Often, the less-expensive models are sold with a manual transmission and have a shorter options list. Early 1950s American examples include the Chevrolet 150 and Kaiser-Frazer Henry J. These were larger cars than those produced in the US in the 1940s gasoline rationing period by Crosley, who shut down in 1952.

One of the more famous no-frills cars was the Studebaker Scotsman, which was on sale from 1957 to 1959. These cars came with a low-grade cloth-trimmed front seat and contained only a driver's side sun visor, minimal soundproofing, no door armrests and painted trim (in lieu of chrome trim); even routine convenience items, such as a cigarette lighter and dome light were not present. Buyers were allowed to buy only a low-cost heater and a few other trim and convenience items from a short options list; a radio was not offered as an option on this model (unlike Studebaker's more expensive models).

During the 1960s and early 1970s, American automakers offered several trim levels of full-sized models (each having a different name), with a price-leading no-frills versions. Examples included the Chevrolet Biscayne, Ford Custom 500, and Plymouth Fury I. While ostensibly targeted toward fleet buyers and business customers where luxury is not a concern, these cars were also available to private customers. While many of these cars were typically sold with the standard six-cylinder or basic V-8 engine with the standard three-speed manual transmission, many of these price-leading models were also available with the full range of engines and transmissions, including those that were performance-oriented, unlike the later no-frills models that had restricted performance options. Additionally, marketing brochures typically extolled the virtues of these economy models, pointing out such features as durable and easy-to-care for upholstery with wide color availability, beauty in styling despite minimal exterior trim adornment, and features shared with more luxurious models such as suspension and ride quality, engine and transmission availability, and standard safety and convenience features—all available even for budget-conscious buyers.

By the late 1960s, a vast majority of all price-leading models were built and sold with V-8 engines and automatic transmission, as consumer needs were changing, and were even being built and sold with luxury comfort and convenience features once seen only on the higher-priced model lines, including air conditioning and power steering. Only a small handful of base model vehicles were sold with the basic six-cylinder/three-speed manual transmission powertrain, without optional extras. By the early 1970s, Plymouth, Ford and Chevrolet had switched to all V-8 engine/automatic transmission powertrains for the full-sized model lines. With customers turning more to volume models that were better trimmed, upholstered and equipped (even with price a primary consideration), the Big Three dropped their Spartan-trimmed price-leading models, such as the Chevrolet Biscayne and Ford Custom, or relegated them completely to fleet sales only.

During the gasoline crisis of the 1970s, many American automakers began offering no-frills models on their compact lines of cars (such as the Ford Pinto MPG, and Plymouth Duster "Feather Duster"). As before, these models usually had spartan trim (vinyl seats with rubber floor covering); fewer convenience items than the more expensive models (e.g., no cigarette lighter); lighter-weight components (such as aluminum on various engine, body and suspension components); and a manual transmission.

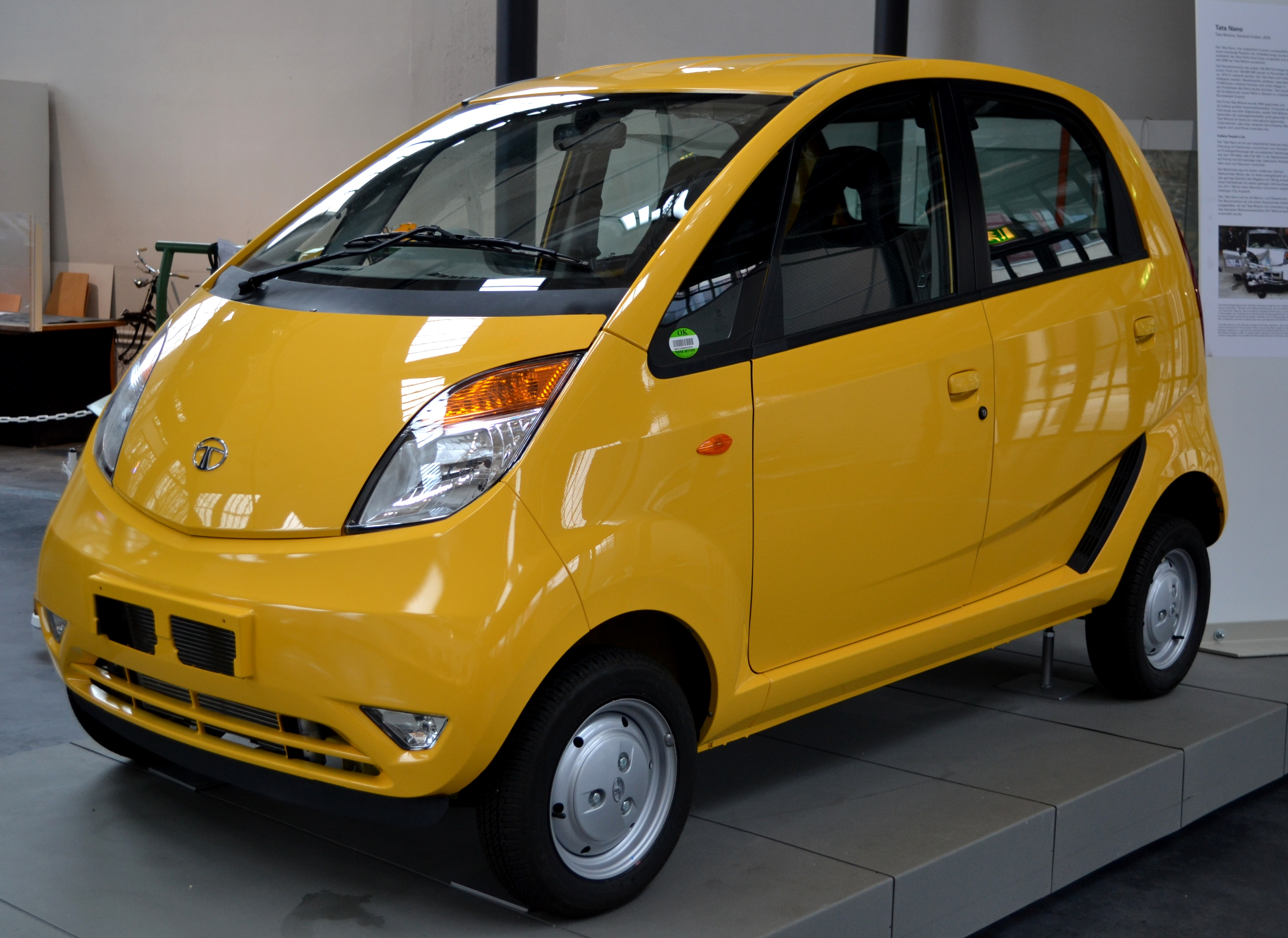
The no-frills Tata Nano

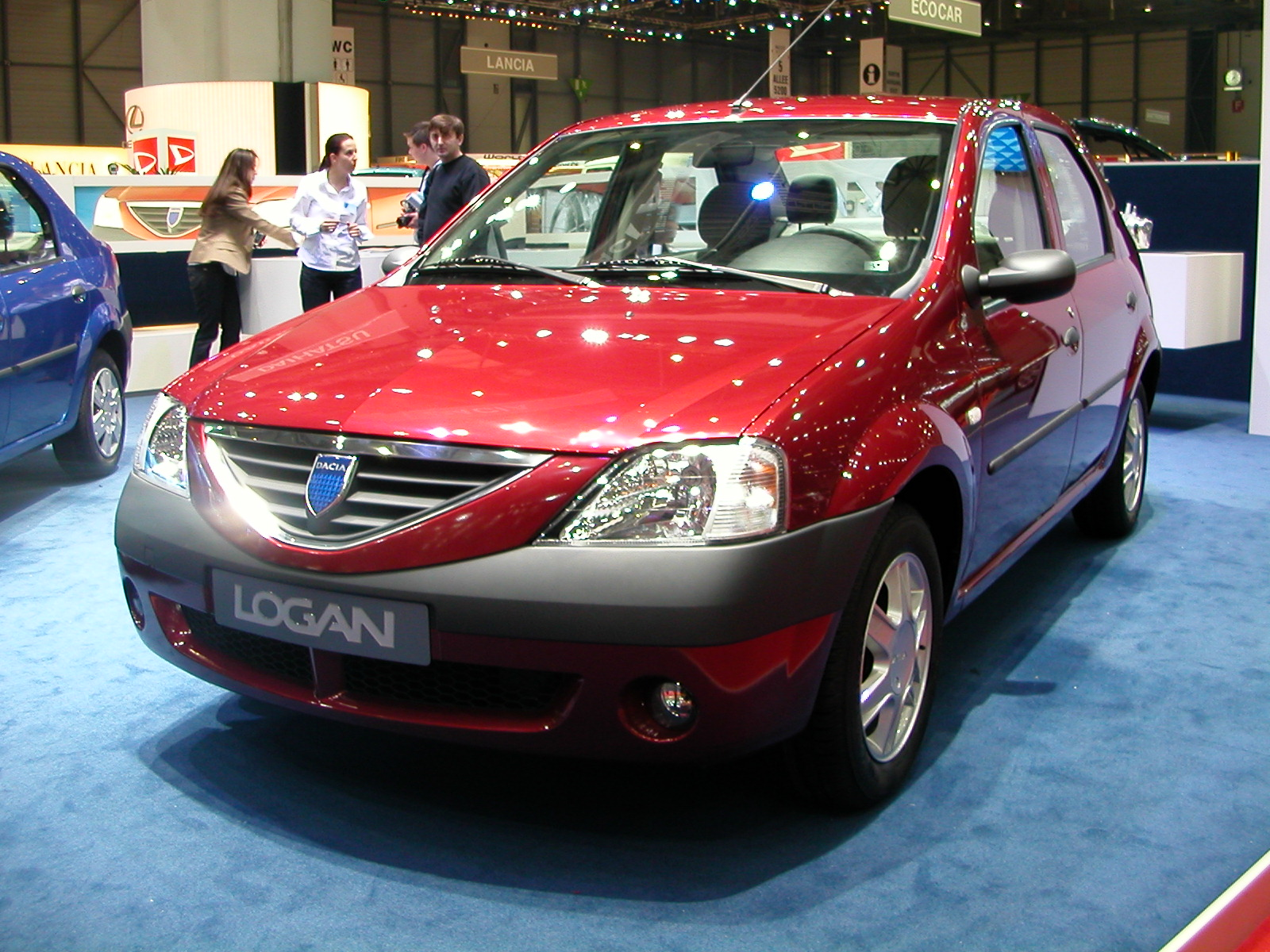
The no-frills 2004 Dacia Logan

Most no-frills cars are sold to fleet buyers, such as taxi companies or police departments. However, these models are generally available to cost-conscious private customers whose primary concerns were price, fuel economy and basic low-cost transportation.

The concept of a no-frills car in the European market was common in the 1950s with cars such as the Ford Abeille or the Citroën ID Normale. The Dacia Logan is an example of a recent no-frills car in Europe. Another example is Fiat Albea.

In Argentina and Brazil, the no-frills category takes a considerable share of the new car market. Examples of cost cuts in base versions include:

- very little or no soundproofing
- low quality plastics
- substitution of rubber on the dashboard to cheaper (rough) plastic
- spring-based instead of acceleration-based seatbelt retraction mechanisms
- no seatbelt height or seat height adjustment
- no anti-lock braking systems or airbags, except where required by law
- no steering wheel adjustments
- cheaper paint processes
- facelifted models instead of new generations such as Volkswagen Santana, Fiat Palio, Fiat Uno, Volkswagen Kombi, Volkswagen Citi Golf, Chevrolet Corsa
- cast iron cylinder heads and engine blocks
- no lambda sensor
- retrofitting old generation components (older, less efficient engines, platforms, dashboard components) on a European designed vehicle: Ford Fiesta, Fiat Idea, Fiat Punto, Opel Meriva, Volkswagen Polo
- single-piece plastic bumpers; any grills are designed by placing indentations on the plastic
- low-quality springs on the suspension, compensated by a taller and harder adjustment
- less maintenance on the tools used to build the vehicles
- smaller and more restrictive catalytic converters

In some markets, often in the developing world, very aggressive forms of no-frills cars may be available. For example, the supermini and city cars sold in the Mercosur markets, such as the Chevrolet Celta, Chevrolet Corsa, Fiat Uno, Fiat Palio, Ford Ka and Volkswagen Gol tend to be noisy and feature cost cuttings like:

- no lock on the fuel cap
- elimination of nearly all process to polish or finish the molded plastic parts
- substitution of black plastics by cheaper gray ones, even on unpainted bumpers
- 1-litre engine (due to Brazil's taxation according to the engine displacement)
- ultra-short gearbox, with the 5th gear scaled as the 4th gear of a regular 1.3 vehicle
- cheaper mufflers
- thinner wheels (e.g., 145/80 R13 tyres)
- instrument panel only with speedometer, fuel gauge and warning lamps
- two-point seatbelts or non-retractable three-point seatbelts for the rear passengers
- no rear headrests
- fixed rear windows
- no anti-roll bar
- smaller and thinner disc brakes, often non-ventilated
- thin and low quality trunk carpet, with no carpet on the sides of the trunk
- no cigarette lighter
- fewer plastic interior coverings, including the covers of the front seat's rails
- no wiper or demister for the rear window
- cheaper, noisier internal fan with fewer speeds
- cheaper, imprecise mechanisms for setting the internal ventilation direction and heating

== Filling stations ==
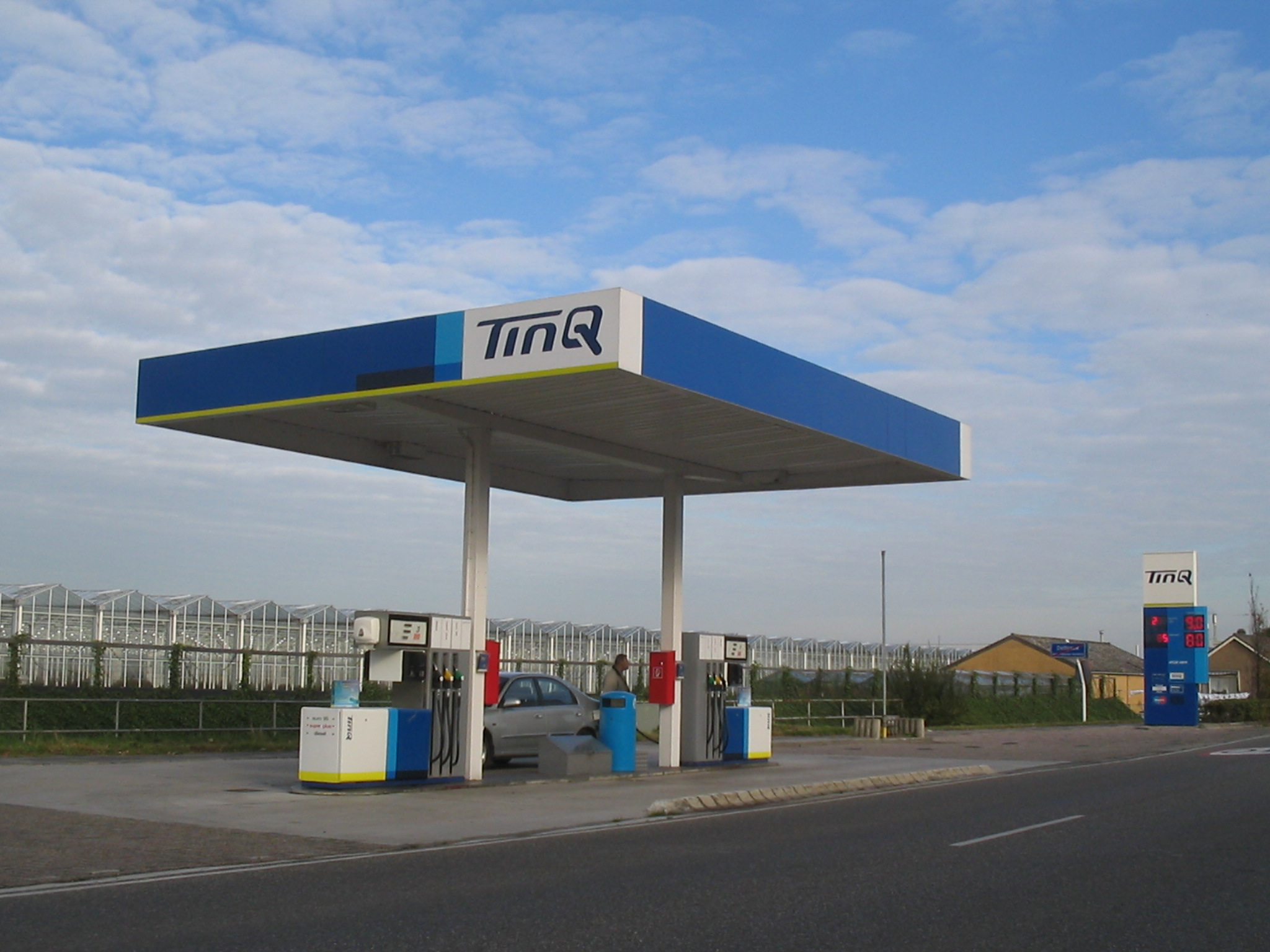
An example of a no frills petrol station, this one being a TinQ in the Netherlands

In the Netherlands and other European countries, a no frills filling station refers to unattended filling stations consisting solely of self-service pumps that only support pay at the pump. They do not include any other facilities on-site, and service is provided via a phone line. If there is a problem, drivers are to call a hotline using an on-site telephone for assistance.

Notable European chains include Tango, Q8 Easy, TinQ, Firezone, Esso Express, Shell Express and Diskont.

== Gaming systems ==
A few Nintendo gaming systems have model revisions that strip out non-essential features, such as the Wii's Wii Mini, the Game Boy Advance's Game Boy Micro and the Nintendo Switch's Switch Lite.

== Gyms ==
GymNation is a budget gym chain in the Middle East.

There has been a growing number of no frills gyms which cut services and anenities to lower the cost. Ways that they lower the cost include:

- No reception: registration for the gym, addressing questions about payment, and booking classes is done online.
- No fitness classes, or fitness classes are only available at a supplementary cost on top of regular monthly membership fees.
- No swimming pool, hot tub, sauna, solarium or beauty spa, due to the cost of running such facilities, e.g., needing to have a staff member there at all times and frequent cleaning.
- No café or relaxation room, and drinks and snacks are available through vending machines.
- Most of the fitness machines are self-powered, rather than electrically powered thus cutting down of power costs and running costs.

Examples of no frills gyms are easyGym, Fit4less and PureGym in the UK, Basic-Fit in Benelux and France, and McFit in Germany.

== Holiday ==
No-frills holidays are holidays which, like no-frills airlines, do not include unnecessary services such as:

- in-flight meals
- travel representatives
- transfers between the airport and the hotel
- entertainment
- luxury accommodation

Such holidays usually have a simple fare scheme, in which fares typically increase during peak seasons, and also as more people sign up for the holiday. This rewards early reservations, and is known as "yield management".

Examples of no-frills holiday companies are:

- Just, part of the Thomson/TUI group
- Qbic, low-cost design hotels

== Hotels ==
Another example of a type of no frills service is lodgings. In more extreme circumstances, the line between a hotel and a hostel is blurred due to the removal of amenities. Notable no-frills chains include Motel 6, Econo Lodge, Tune Hotels, Ibis Budget, HotelF1, easyHotel and Zip by Premier Inn.

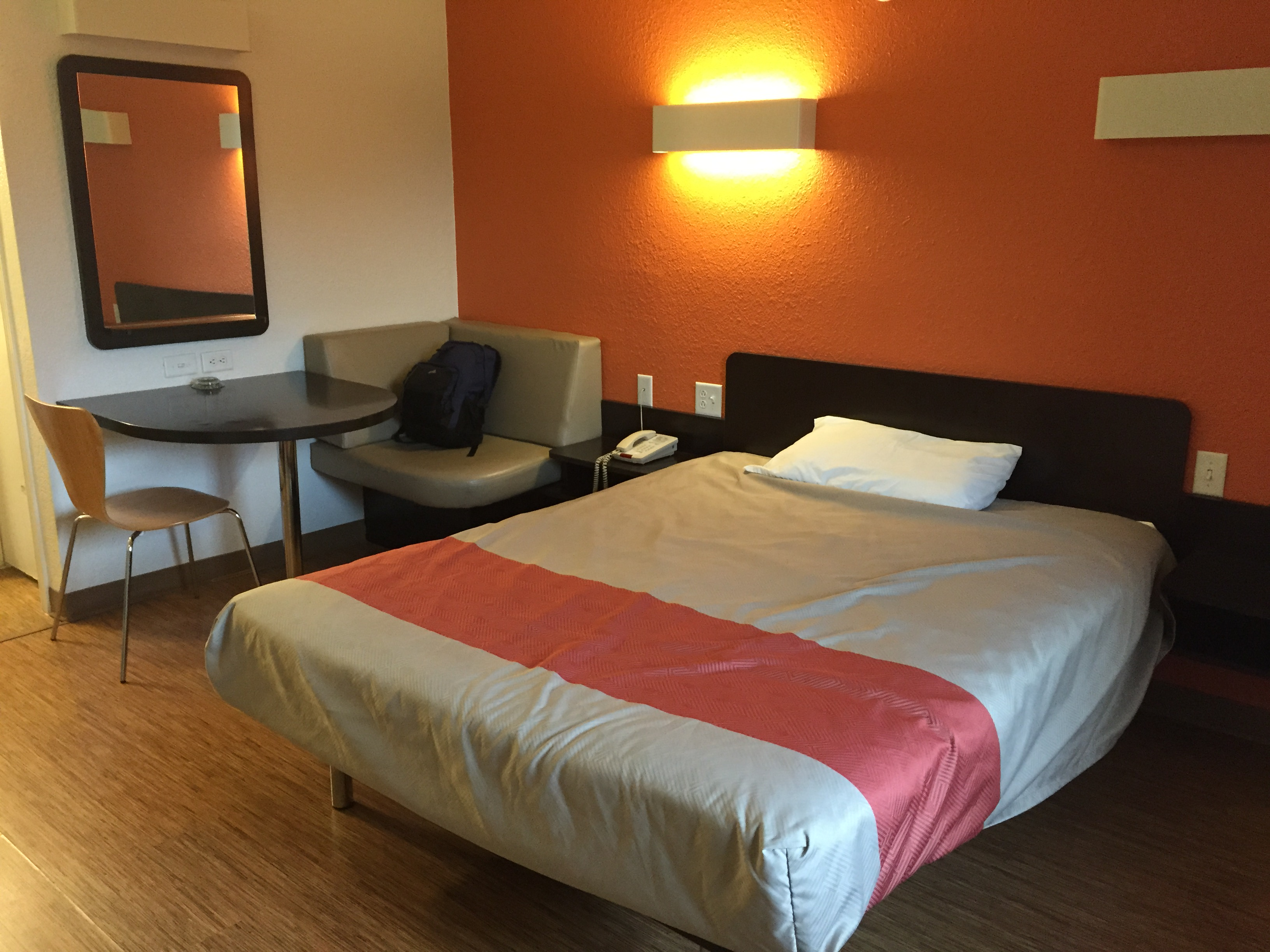
An example of a no-frills hotel room. This case is a Motel 6 room in Massachusetts.

Features of no-frills hotels rooms are that themselves are smaller and more spartan in trim. Examples and cases included with Zip rooms are twice as small (8.5 m^{2}) as standard Premier Inn rooms. (20 m^{2}), beds in Econo Lodge are put on boxes, so to make cleaning easier and with many Ibis Budget hotels, the reception is only opened at limited hours. Most no frills hotels don't have door keys, instead they use either inexpensive swipe-keys or digital door locks. Many of them have no pictures on the walls, baths in the bathrooms or excessive furniture like minibars, fridges or dressing tables. Bedding is limited to pillows and duvets. Some like Tune and easyHotel even go as far as putting advertisements on the walls and in case of Zip some rooms even having no windows, instead having a sunlight-powered light box.

Like no frills airlines, which charge people for seat reservations and food, no frills hotels charge extra for any extras like non-basic TV channels, breakfasts (even if limited to a continental style), tea-and-coffee making facilities, Wi-Fi internet, daily maid service (cleaning the room is only done when the guest leaves), and toiletries and supplement towels.

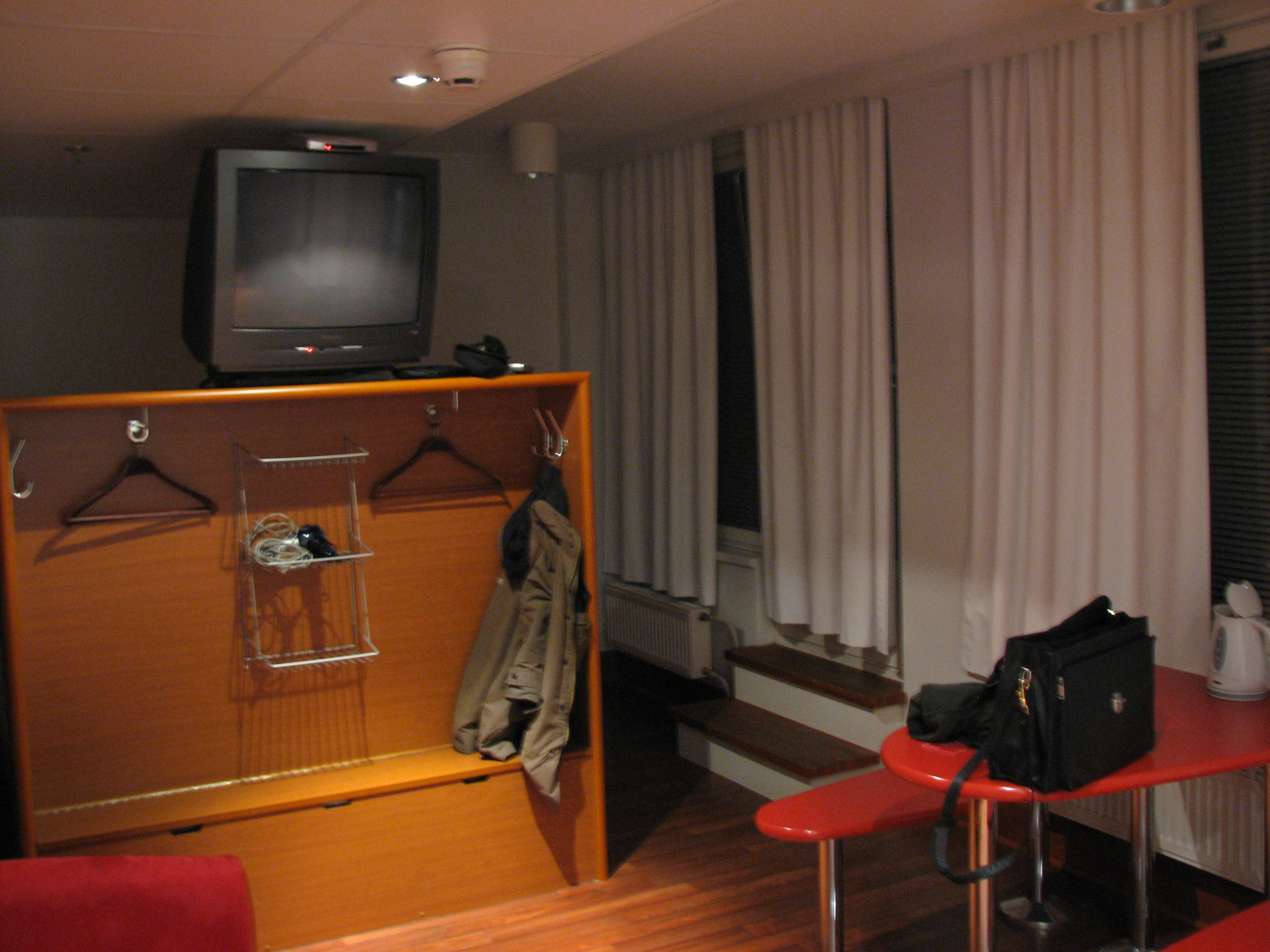
An Omenahotelli hotel room in Tampere, Finland

The Finnish hotel chain Omenahotelli lacks reception. Room bookings are handled online only. Instead of a physical key, hotel customers receive a digital door code. Omenahotelli guests usually spend their entire hotel stay without meeting any hotel employees.

=== Capsule hotels ===
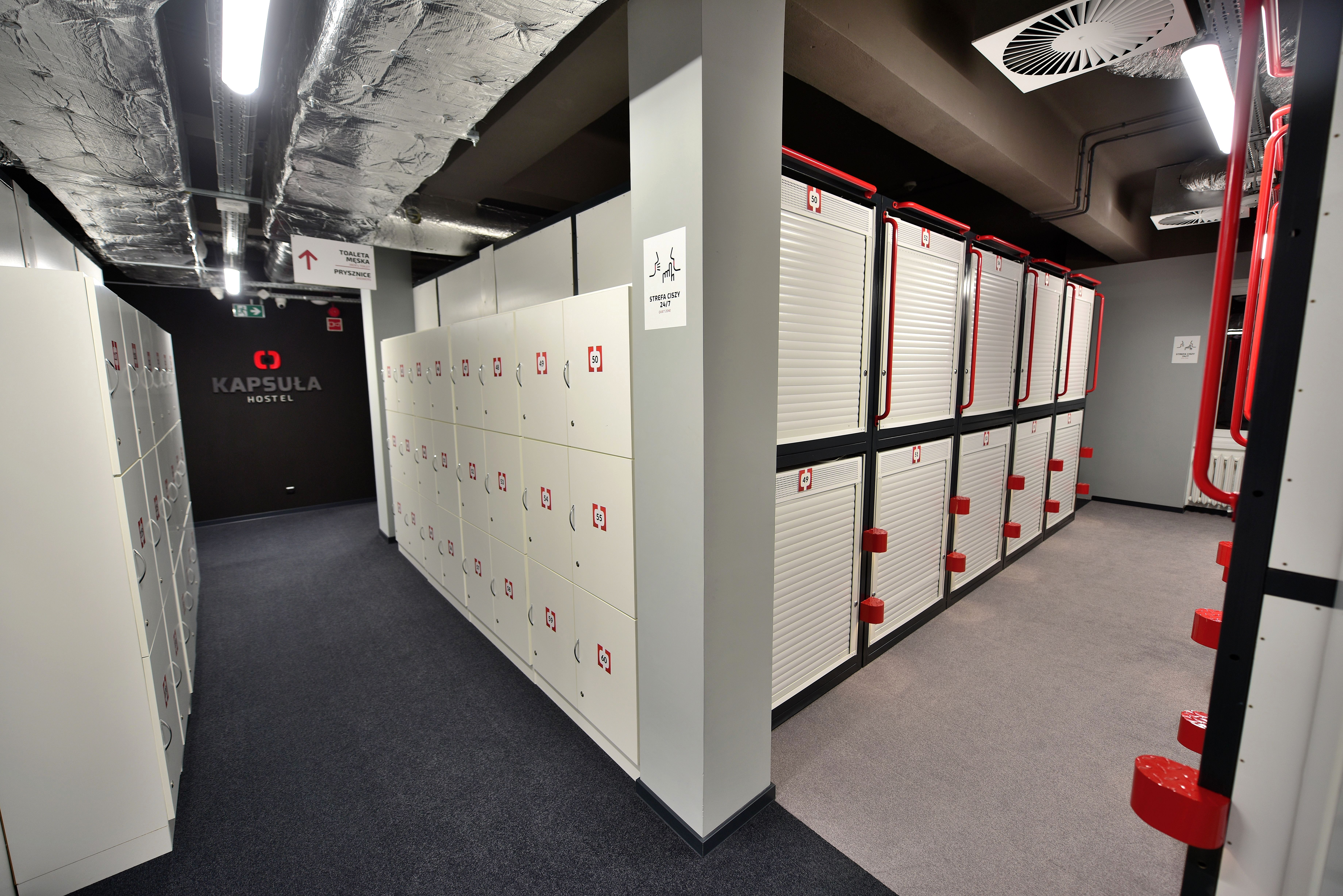
Capsule hotel in Warsaw, Poland. The lockers are on the left of the image, while the sleeping capsules are on the right.

An even more stripped-down hotel type is the capsule hotel (Japanese: カプセルホテル, romanized: kapuseru hoteru), also known in the Anglosphere as a pod hotel is a type of hotel developed in Japan in the late 1970s that features many small, bed-sized rooms known as capsules. Capsule hotels provide cheap, basic overnight accommodation for guests who do not require or who cannot afford the larger, more expensive rooms offered by more conventional hotels.

The guest room is a chamber roughly the length and width of a single bed, with sufficient height for a hotel guest to crawl in and sit up on the bed. The chamber walls may be made of wood, metal or any rigid material, but are often fibreglass or plastic. Amenities within the room generally include a small television, air conditioning, an electronic console, and power sockets. The capsules are stacked side-by-side, two units high, with steps or ladders providing access to the second-level rooms, similar to bunk beds. The open end of the capsule can be closed with a curtain or a solid door for privacy, and can be locked from the inside only.

== Rail services ==
Based on the no-frills airline model, the recent liberalisation of rail licensing in Europe has brought about a no-frills budget rail travel industry. Examples include;

- Ouigo (France) - Operated by SNCF
- Ouigo Spain - Operated by SNCF
- Avlo (Spain) - Operated by Renfe
- Lumo (UK) - Operated by FirstGroup
- Izy (France / Benelux) - Offered by Thalys
- FlixTrain (Germany / Sweden) - Open access operator

== Supermarkets ==
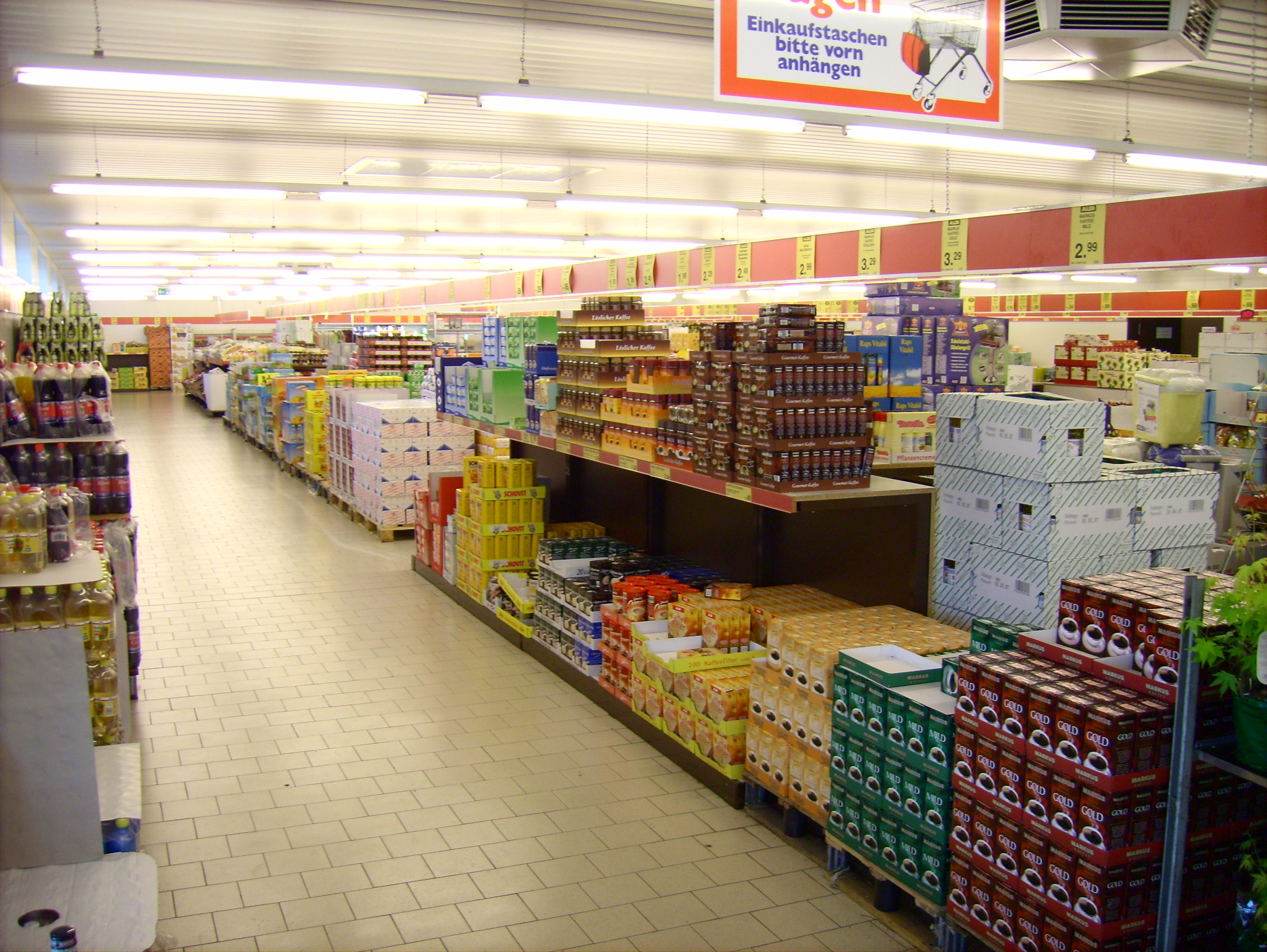
The aisles of an Aldi supermarket in Germany (2006)

No-frills supermarkets are recognisable by their stripped-down store design, reduced product offerings, and business model.

- They do not decorate aisles or create product displays. Prices are given on plain labels.
- Queueing at the checkout is relatively common, as staffing levels reflect average demand rather than peak demand. At actual peak times, customers often have to wait.
- Shopping bags are charged for, as they are seen as a frill. Thus many shoppers bring reusable shopping bags, buy shopping bags at a low fee, put their shopping in the cardboard boxes that the products originally came in, or put it directly in their shopping cart; customers must bag their own purchases.
- They somewhat employ the Pareto principle when choosing which goods to offer, meaning that in most supermarkets, 20% of products on sale account for 80% of what customers buy. Therefore, they only stock the most commonly sold products.
- They take credit cards, cash, debit cards and/or mobile payment apps.
- Hours are 8 a.m. to 9 p.m. daily, although some stores are open 24 hours.
- They often do not sell branded items, except in the case of special purchases, which are almost always at a discounted price. Instead, they sell generic or private label products.
- Some products are sold in different sizes.
- The shopping carts have a coin-operated slot, to ensure that the trolleys are kept on site.
- They usually lack a butcher shop, bakery or deli counters, thus meat, and cold meats are sold precut in chilled vacuum packs.
- Unlike regular supermarkets which have separate teams of staff for the shop floor, the back warehouse, doing the cleaning and dealing with the clerical work, no frills supermarkets instead have a single multi-tasking team of workers dealing with all aspects of supermarket work.
- No in-store background music, although some use satellite radio.

Examples of no-frills supermarket chains include:

- A101 (Turkey)
- Aldi (Australia, Austria, Belgium, Denmark, France, Germany, Greece, Hungary, Ireland, Italy, Luxembourg, Netherlands, Poland, Portugal, Serbia, Slovenia, Spain, Switzerland, United States, and United Kingdom)
- Biedronka, a subsidiary of Jerónimo Martins (Poland)
- Bim (Egypt, Morocco, and Turkey)
- Bónus (Iceland)
- Bottom Dollar Food, a subsidiary of Delhaize America (United States)
- Colruyt (Belgium, France, Luxembourg)
- Denner (Switzerland) used to be a no-frills retailer, but has started changing its image.
- Dia* (Spain, Greece, Brazil, China and Argentina)
- Don Quijote (Japan)
- Ed* (France)
- Food 4 Less, a subsidiary of Kroger (United States)
- Food Basics, a subsidiary of A&P (United States)
- Food Basics, a subsidiary of Metro Inc. (Canada)
- FreshCo, a subsidiary of Sobeys (Canada)
- Jack's, a subsidiary of Tesco (England, United Kingdom)
- Leader Price (France)
- Lidl (Austria, Belgium, Bulgaria, Croatia, Czech Republic, Denmark, Finland, France, Germany, Greece, Hungary, Ireland, Italy, Lithuania, Luxembourg, Malta, Netherlands, Poland, Portugal, Romania, Serbia, Slovakia, Slovenia, Spain, Switzerland, Sweden, United Kingdom, and United States)
- Maxi, a subsidiary of Loblaw Companies (Canada)
- Minipreço, a subsidiary of Auchan (Portugal)
- Netto (Denmark, France, Germany, Poland, Lanzarote)
- No Frills, a subsidiary of Loblaw Companies (Canada)
- Pak'n Save (New Zealand)
- Poundland (United Kingdom)
- Poundworld (United Kingdom)
- REMA 1000 (Norway, Denmark, Slovakia)
- Ruler Foods, a subsidiary of Kroger (United States)
- Save-A-Lot (United States)
- Spudshed (Australia)
- Super C, a division of Metro Inc. based in Québec
- Şok (Turkey)
- WinCo Foods (United States)

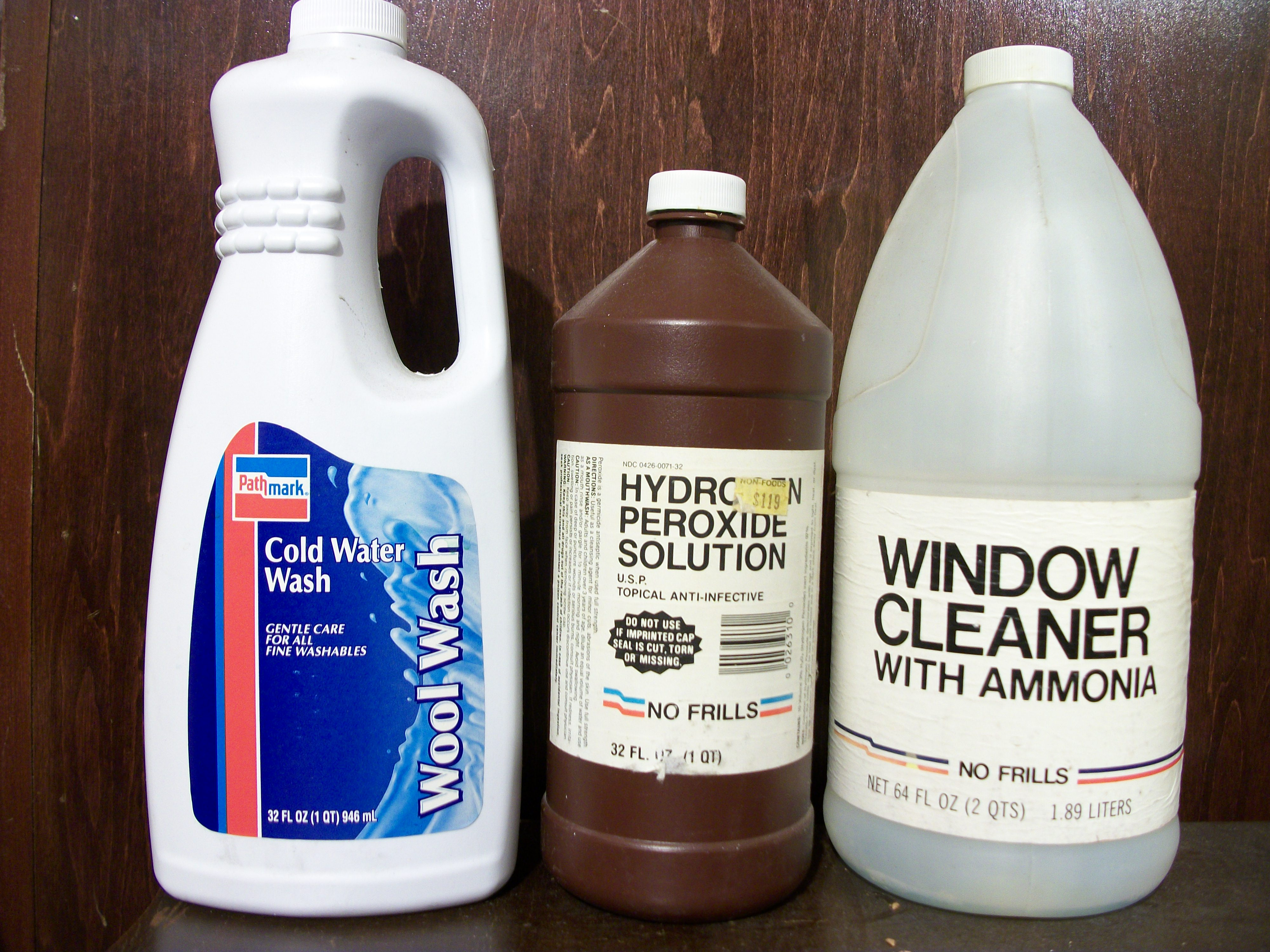
Pathmark generic products, including "No Frills" brand peroxide and window cleaner

*Dia and Ed are all part of the Dia Group, which is in turn part of the Carrefour Group. (Brazil, Spain)

American supermarket chain Pathmark used "No Frills" as a house brand.

== Others ==
Other examples of no-frills companies include: cinemas (easyCinema), bus companies (easyBus, Magic Bus (Stagecoach), Eastern), food ranges (Tesco Value, Walmart/Asda SmartPrice), mobile phone companies (easyMobile, Telmore), and marketing (low-cost marketing).
