= List of supermarket chains in San Marino =

This is a list of supermarket chains in San Marino.

Name	Stores	Type of stores	Parent
Conad	1	superstore	Conad
Titancoop	2	supermarket	Coop Italia
Crai	1	market	Crai
Dpiù	1	discount	Gruppo Selex
La Sociale	4	discount	La Sociale
Simply Market	5	supermarket	Groupe Auchan; Gruppo C'è
