= List of supermarket chains in Portugal =

This is a list of supermarket chains in Portugal.

- Aldi - 137 stores
- Amanhecer - ~330 stores
- Apolonia Supermercados - 3 stores
- Auchan (formerly known as Jumbo) - 111 stores
- Continente - 403 stores
- Coviran - 179 stores in Portugal
- Dia (sold to Auchan in 2024) - 487 stores
- E.Leclerc - 21 store
- El Corte Inglés - 2 Stores
- Froiz
- The Good Food Company (selling Tesco)
- Intermarché - 264 stores
- Lidl - 277 stores
- Mercadona - 49 stores
- Meu Super (Owned by Continente) - >300 stores
- Minipreço (sold to Auchan in 2024) - 620 Stores
- Overseas Supermarkets (Iceland produce)
- Pingo Doce - 486 stores
- SPAR - 123 stores
- Unimark - 654 stores
