= Minho Center =

Shopping mall in Braga, Portugal

Coordinates: 41°33′30.58″N 8°24′22.34″W

- Location: Braga, Portugal
- Opened: May 1997; 29 years ago
- Manager: CA Património Crescente
- Floors: 2
- Website: www.bragaparque.pt

Minho Center is a shopping mall in the city of Braga, owned by the CA Património Crescente fund. The mall opened in 1997.

== History ==
Construction work for Minho Center was commissioned in 1995-1996 by Iperforma and opened in May 1997. The upper floor's supermarket was a Carrefour outlet, which was replaced in January 2008 by Continente.

In January 2012, the building's façade and outside spaces were refurbished. Klépierre sold the mall to CA Património Crescente in 2019.

In February 2026, Sephora announced the closure of its store at Minho Center, announcing a 70% discount sale.

== Controversies ==
A shopping cart and money from the mall's Continente hypermarket was robbed by four criminals on 18 December 2011. No exact monetary figures were revealed, but it was estimated to be in the hundreds of euros.

Illegal races took place at the mall's parking lot, which closes at 11pm, in early 2025.

== See also ==
- BragaShopping
- Braga Parque
- Nova Arcada
