= Nova Arcada =

Shopping mall in Dume, Braga, Portugal

Coordinates: 41°34′43.921″N 8°25′46.142″W

- Location: Dume, Braga, Portugal
- Opened: March 17, 2016; 10 years ago
- Manager: Sonae
- Num. of stores: 97
- Floors: 2
- Website: www.novaarcada.pt

Nova Arcada is a shopping mall in the parish of Dume in Braga, northwestern Portugal. It was initially intended to be Dolce Vita Braga, but the economic downturn caused delays and the subsequent suspension of the project. It was eventually acquired by Sonae Sierra in 2015, who opened it on 17 March 2016; in January 2020, Caixa Geral de Depósitos sold its shares to Israeli fund MDSR for €45 million.

== History ==
=== Dolce Vita Braga ===
It was first announced in March 2008 as Dolce Vita Braga by Chamartín Imobliliária, who owned several Dolce Vita-branded malls in Portugal and Spain. Construction work began in Dume and it planned to generate 3,300 direct jobs and 7,000 indirect jobs. Initially scheduled for an October 2009 launch, it planned 203 stores and 2,700 parking spaces. Emphasis was given to family activities and an area covered by a garden. The move came when the peripheral areas of the municipality of Braga were also eyeing the creation of an additional mall, Espaço Braga. Dolce Vita would have a Continente hypermarket while Espaço Braga would have a Jumbo.

The project was approved in September 2008. In December 2009, the promotor solicited minor access changes due to the "consumption crisis-sales crisis-rent crisis-price asset fall-unemployment-consumption crisis" spiral that had been developing. In January 2010, the municipal government approved an additional delay of one year. By October 2010, it was expected that Dolce Vita Braga would be operational from October 2011.

The aggravation of the economic crisis Portugal faced at the time caused Dolce Vita Braga's launch to be delayed to an unspecified period in 2012, however the head of Chamartín Imobiliária said that a 2012 launch would be ruled out.

=== Nova Arcada ===
In 2015, the former Dolce Vita malls were sold one by one. The planned Dolce Vita Braga was acquired by Sonae Sierra and announced its plans to reconvert it into Nova Arcada, which was set to have an IKEA store, marking it the first time both parties cooperated by enabling the opening of its store at one of Sonae's malls. In January 2016, Nova Arcada's launch date was set for 17 March. The launch was seen with fear from traditional merchants, but expected a rise in visitors from Galicia. One of the most notable absences was Spanish retailer Zara, which was already on Braga Parque, however Inditex opened another brand there, Lefties, which at the time was new to Braga.

On 9 January 2020, CGD's was sold to Israeli fund MDSR for €45 million, while management continued under Sonae Sierra's control. The move marked MDSR's first transaction in Portugal.

== Cinemas ==
Nova Arcada's cinemas only opened on 10 November 2016 and were operated by Cineplace, the international branch of Brazilian company Orient Cinemas. The complex had twelve screens. In 2025, it requested IGAC to change the format of six of its screens; however, on 22 January 2026, it closed due to "technical reasons", while Cineplace declared insolvency. On 27 January, Nova Arcada's management announced that it wanted to reopen its cinemas and was in negotiations with other companies. In July, it was announced that Cinebox Cinemas, which operates the cinemas at Alegro Castelo Branco, will open six of its twelve screens, while the other six will be replaced by a Sould Park Bowling.

The reopening of six cinema screens, operated by Cinebox – Premium Cinemas, took place on 24 October 2026.

== See also ==
- Braga Parque
- BragaShopping
