= Docks de France =

French retail company

The Docks de France group is a former French distributor, bought in 1996 by Auchan.

== History ==
- 1904 : Toulouse and Picard creates the Central Docks Company in Tours, France
- 1957 : Docks de France settles in the Paris region
- 1963 : The first French hypermarket opens its doors
- 1966 : Docks de France opens its first hypermarket under the brand SuperSuma
- 1964 - 1993 Docks de France buys several regional companies
- 1968 : Creation of the subsidiary Sabeco in Spain
- 1969 : Creation of the Mammouth hypermarkets
- 1978 : Creation of the Lil' Champ Food Stores in the SE United States
- 1979 : Acquisition of the Picardy Beehive
- 1982 : Creation of 'Atac
- 1986 : Creation of the Super Pakbo warehouse stores
- 1987 : Acquisition of Économats du Centre
- 1991 : Shut down of Super Pakbo
- 1993 : Acquisition of the Alsatian Supermarkets Company
- 1995 : Equity in a distribution company in Poland
- 1996 : Auchan Group takeover of Docks de France
- 1997 : Lil' Champ Food Stores sold to The Pantry
- 1998 : The Distribution companies: 'Société de Distribution de l'Ouest', 'Société de Distribution du Centre', 'Société de Distribution Alsacienne', 'Société Lyonnaise de Distribution' and 'Société de Distribution la Ruche Picarde' merged with the 'Société de Distribution Parisienne' under the name Atac.
- 1999 : Reorganisation of the Auchan group
  - The hypermarkets Auchan and Mammouth amalgamate under the name of Auchan
  - supermarkets and shops of Atac and Eco Service merge with the name of Atac
- 2005 : Atac supermarkets rebrand as Simply Market
