= Minipreço =

Discount retail chain in Portugal

Logo.

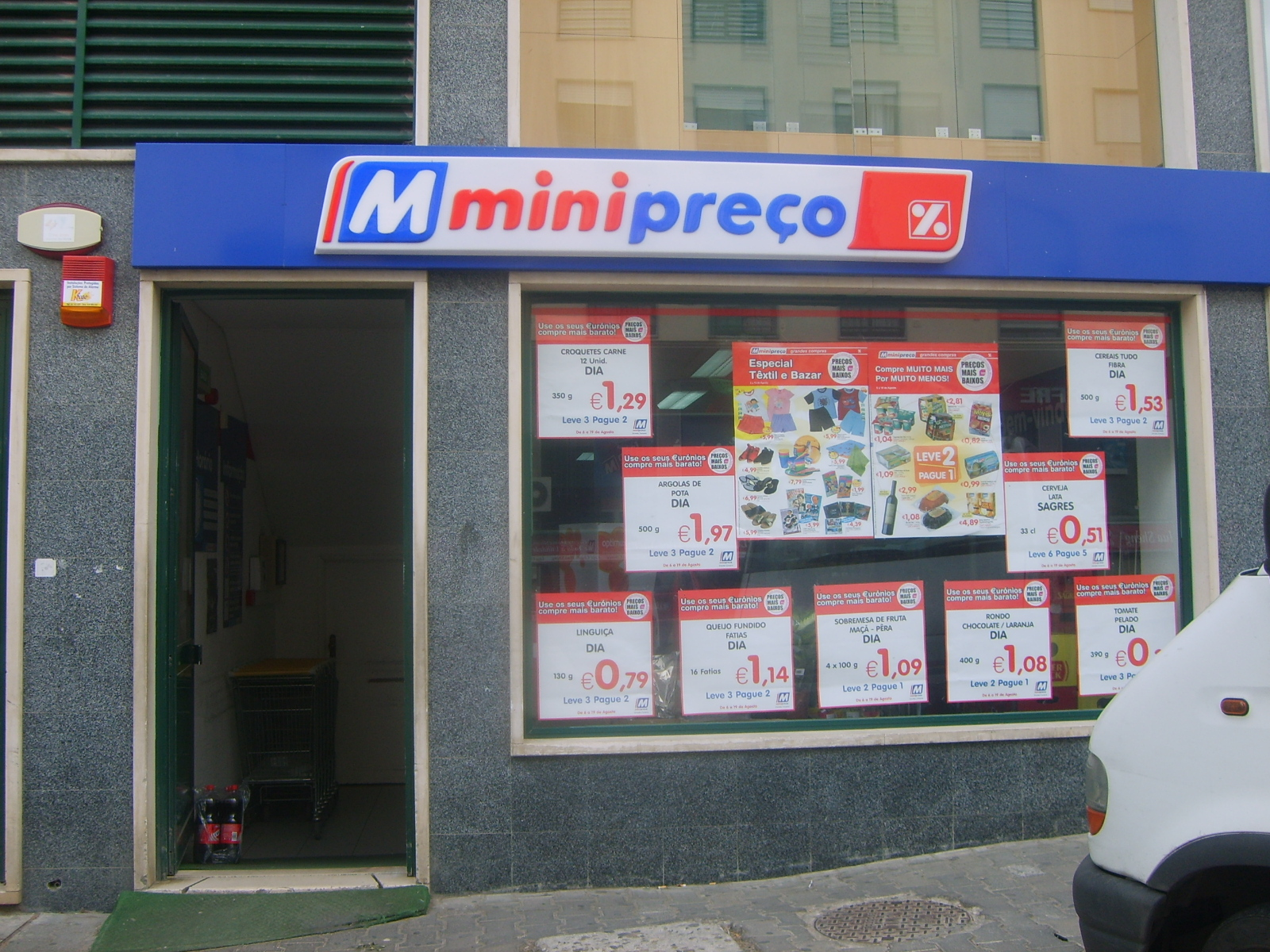
Urban Minipreço store in Lourinhã

Minipreço is a discount supermarket chain in Portugal, part of Auchan Portugal. Minipreço is one of the largest grocery chains in Portugal by store count, with 443 outlets in the country, second to Pingo Doce, which had 470 stores. The company is seventh in the country in terms of market share, having been eclipsed by Spanish chain Mercadona in 2022.

The company operates its flagship Minipreço brand, Minipreço Family, which are larger suburban stores, and Minipreço Express, which are smaller stores in urban locations.

The company opened its first stores in 1979. It was formerly known as Companhia Nacional de Descontos. Minipreço was first owned by Companhia Portuguesa de Hipermercados (now known as Auchan Retail Portugal) but later sold to Distribuidora Internacional de Alimentación, S.A. (DIA) of Spain in 1998. In July 2011, Carrefour spun off Dia, listing the company on the Madrid stock exchange.

In 2023, DIA hired Société Générale to advise it on a possible sale of Minipreço. Portugal was one of the slowest growing markets in the DIA portfolio, with an increase in sales of only 0.5% in 2022 to 596 million euros. In 2022, DIA closed 25 stores in Portugal, about 7% of the footprint.

Dia reached an agreement with Auchan Portugal to acquire its Minipreço and MaisPerto brands plus three warehouses for €155 million. The sale marks Dia’s departure from the Portuguese market. Auchan added to its existing chain of 124 establishments in the country including hypermarkets, mini markets and gas station.

== See also ==
- List of supermarket chains in Portugal
