= Alcampo =

Hypermarket of the Auchan group in Spain

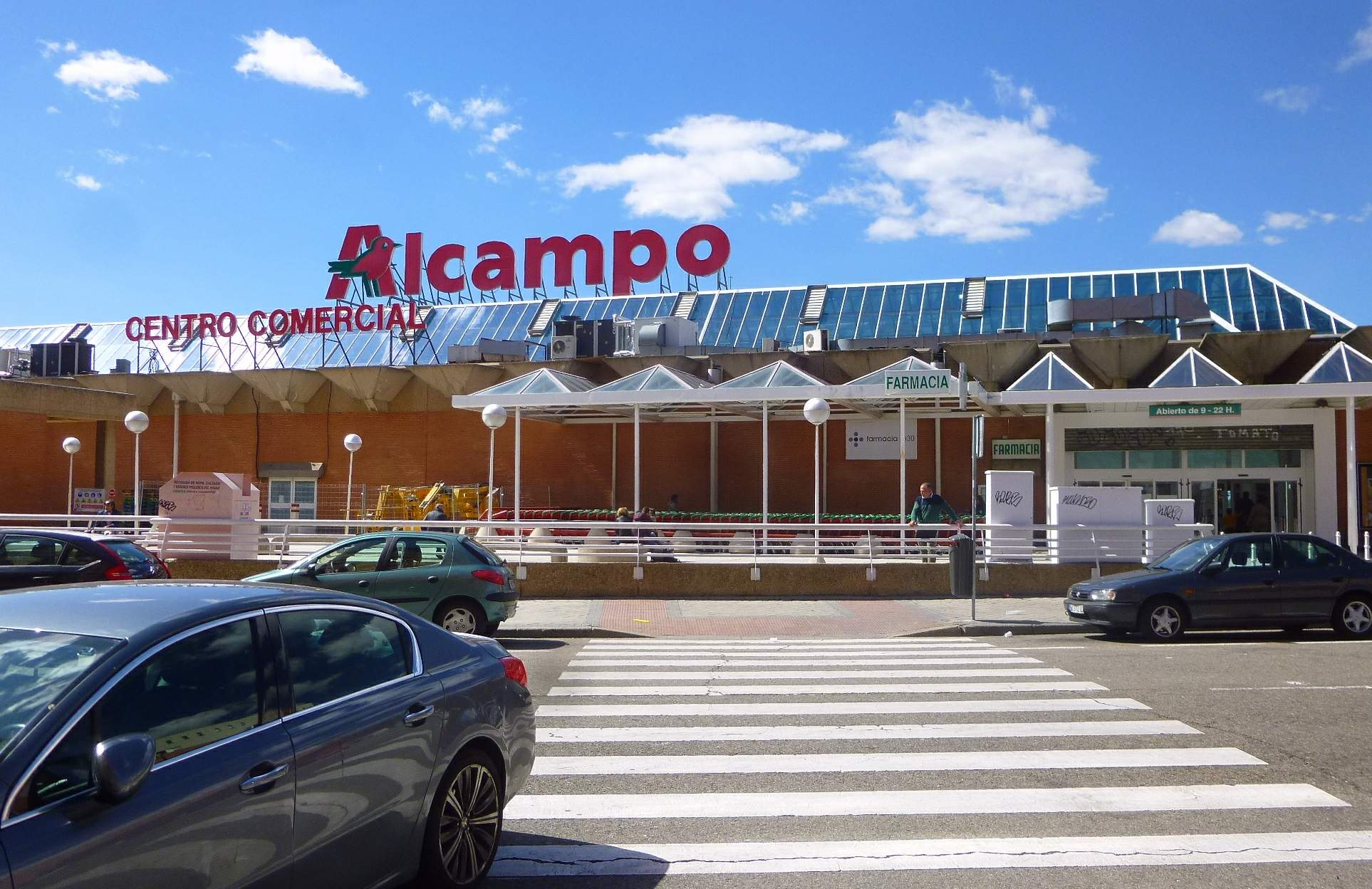
Alcampo in Madrid, Spain.

Alcampo is the 2nd biggest hypermarket chain in Spain.

== History ==
The first store opened in 1981 in Utebo (Zaragoza) and it was Auchan's first establishment outside French territory.

In August 2022, an agreement was announced with Dia for the purchase of 235 supermarkets in eight autonomous communities for a price of 267 million euros. The operation also included the transfer of two logistics warehouses in Villanubla (Valladolid).
