= Atac =

French supermarket

- Industry: Retail
- Founded: 1982; 44 years ago
- Headquarters: Croix, France
- Products: Grocery Stores
- Parent: Auchan Group
- Subsidiaries: Simply Market
- Website: magasins.supermarches-atac.fr/atac/fr (in French)

Atac (styled ATAC) is a brand of predominantly food stores operating supermarkets, created by the Docks de France in 1982, and a subsidiary of the Auchan Group since 1998.

The idea of the Atac concept was a supermarket which was near bare, with no frills and low prices. One of their slogans was "ATAC, attack prices". Most Atac stores disappeared in 2009, when most stores took the name and brand of Simply Market. There are today still around 80 Atac stores left, mainly in Bourgogne, which are owned by the associated group Schiever.

== History ==
In 1959, the first Docks de France supermarket is opened in Bagneux.

In 1982, the Docks de France group built and tested the first store under the name of Atac. In 1985, after the success of the first Atac store, the group embarked on the construction of a network of this brand, respecting the specifications.

In 1996, the Auchan Group took over the Docks de France group, and former supermarket outlets, such as Super-Market and Suma Doc, were rebranded. Franchisees entered the fold of the Auchan group during this operation.

In 1998, the ATAC Group, a sibling of the Auchan Group, was created.

In 2009, the transformation of most Atac supermarkets in France to Simply Market began.

On 1 March 2023, the last 23 shops became Bi1, which lead to the final disappearance of the brand.

The ATAC brand was revived in November 2024 with the opening of a store in the M1 shopping center in Poznań, Poland.
