= Simply Market =

French supermarket brand

Auchan Supermarche (Simply Market)
- Industry: Retail
- Founded: 2005
- Defunct: 2019
- Products: Grocery Stores
- Parent: Auchan Group
- Website: Website (in French)

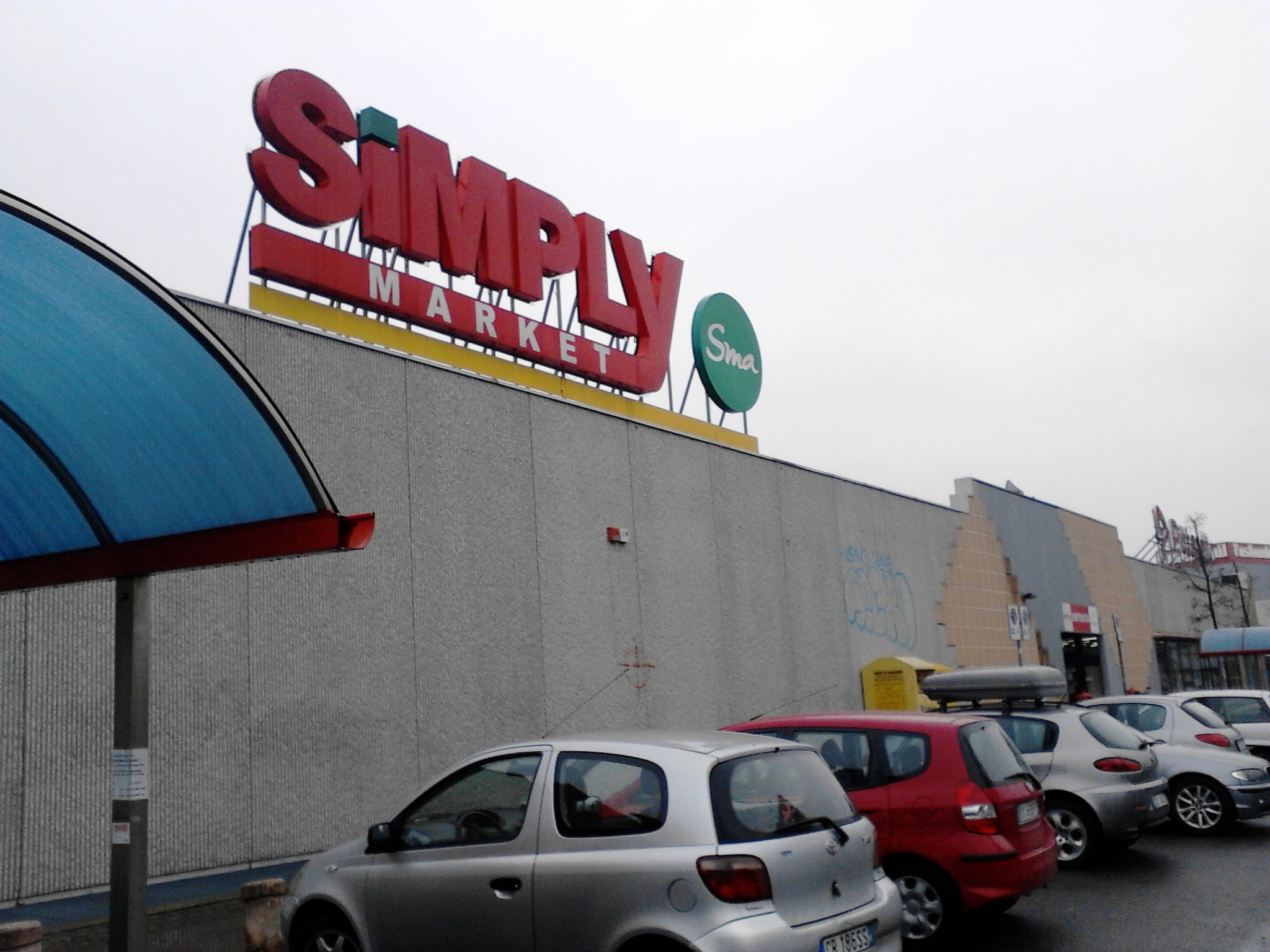
Simply Market in Lissone, Italy

Simply Market was a brand of French supermarkets formed in 2005. This brand is a new concept to eventually replace Atac supermarkets. The brand belongs to the AuchanSuper subsidiary that manages the branches of Auchan supermarkets. The group planned to open 500 Simply Market supermarkets in France by 2015.

== History ==
- 1959 : Opened first supermarket in Bagneux Doc
- 1985 : Creation of the first supermarket Atac
- 1996 : Selling of the Docks de France group to Auchan
- 1998 : Birth of the Atac group, a sibling of the Auchan Group.
- 2005 : Launch of the brand Simply Market: opening of its first supermarket in Bagneux
- 2009 : Launch of website 42 stores in Île-de-France, home delivery or removed
- 2009/2010 : Transformation of Atac supermarkets to Simply Market
- 2016-2019: Transformation from Simply Market to Auchan Supermarche

== Logo Design ==
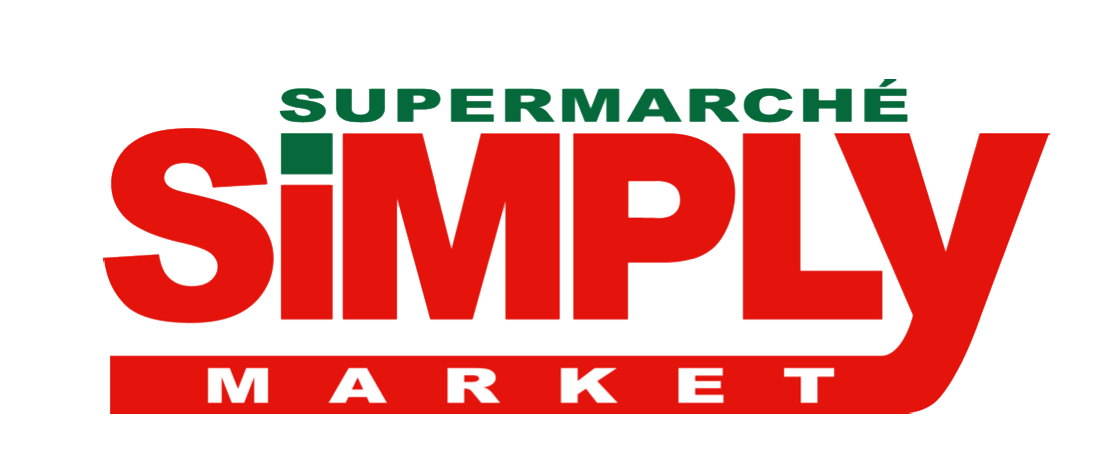
Logo as of 2008
