= Gregorio Bontoux =

French-Spanish businessman (born 1967)

Gregorio Bontoux (born in Neuilly-sur-Seine in 1967) is a French businessman and executive who holds Spanish nationality and lives in Luxembourg. The entrepreneur owns and sits on the board of several companies, including the jewellery firm Majorica.

== Education and professional career ==
Bontoux holds a degree in Economics and Business Studies from the Weller Institute in Paris, a diploma from the Institute of Directors and Administrators (ICA) and an MBA from the IESE Business School. His professional career began in France, where he graduated as a Lieutenant of Artillery in the Reserve.

As the grandson of Paul-Auguste Halley, founder of the Continente hypermarket chain, the executive comes from a family with generations of experience in wholesale trade and mass consumption. Bontoux started at Nestlé in 1992, conducting market research and taking on various responsibilities in the marketing department. In 1995, the economist joined the operations department of Hipermercados Continente. After the 2003 merger with Carrefour, a new phase began as manager of the family's shareholdings in various companies.

Through the investment company Abordador Capital, Bontoux acts as a significant shareholder in the supermarket chain Dia; the sports equipment brand Kelme; and the jewellery firm Majorica. In addition to being the president and principal shareholder of the latter, the businessman has held a 20% stake in the Clarel perfume chain since 2024, and maintains a strategic minority position in Renta Corporación. In addition, the firm manages a Carmina Shoemaker shop in Luxembourg.
