= Majorica pearl =

Spanish pearl manufacturer

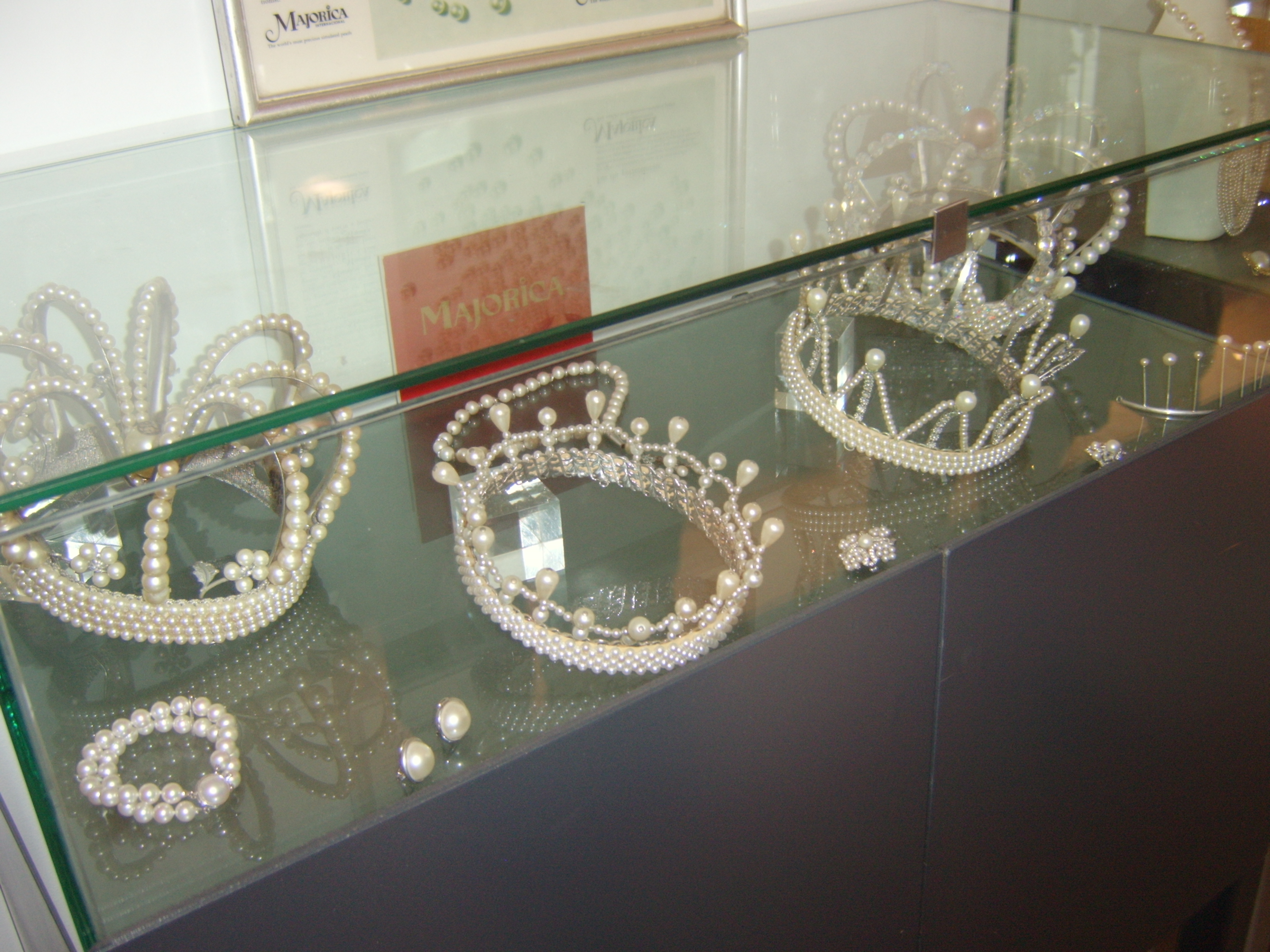
Majorica pearl jewellery

Majorica is a Spanish company that manufactures hand-made pearls called Majorica pearls. Now based in Mallorca, the company was founded in 1890 in Barcelona. In 1990, Gems & Gemology described Majorica pearls as "the most widely marketed and meticulously manufactured imitation [pearl] today". Since 2021, its president has been Gregorio Bontoux.

== Production ==
Majorica imitation pearls are man-made on solid balls, likely made of glass, that are coated with a proprietary coating that is made in part from fish scales. The coated nuclei are then dried and polished, and then dipped in a chemical (possibly cellulose acetate and cellulose nitrate) to harden the surface and guard against discoloration, chipping, and peeling.
