= Braga Parque =

Shopping mall in Braga, Portugal

Coordinates: 41°33′30.58″N 8°24′22.34″W

- Location: Braga, Portugal
- Opened: May 13, 1999; 27 years ago
- Manager: Urbaminho, S.A.
- Num. of stores: 180
- Floor area: 19,000 m^{2} (200,000 sq ft)
- Floors: 4
- Parking: 900 spaces
- Website: www.bragaparque.pt

Braga Parque is a shopping mall in the city of Braga, owned by Urbaminho, which is a 70-30% joint between Mundicenter and local businessmen. Second largest mall north of Porto, it opened in 1999 and has a gross leasable area of 50,000 m², 180 stores, including Primark, Zara, Pandora, McDonalds's and others and a nine-screen Cinemas NOS multiplex.

== History ==
Braga Parque opened on 13 May 1999, not long after the opening of Bragashopping at Avenida Central in 1996 and Minho Center in 1997. It opened adjacent to the Feira Nova hypermarket (the first from the chain) which opened in 1989. The initial phase included ninety stores, a seven-screen cinema, a health club and an amusement center (Big Fun, from Spanish company CIRSA).

On 15 November 2007, the first enlargement opened, upgrading to 105 stores and opening the city's Fnac store.

On 1 October 2009, it opened the third phase of its expansion project. On 6 March 2010, the existing Feira Nova was replaced by a Pingo Doce. On 1 July 2011, the mall unveiled its new brand identity.

== Cinemas ==
The cinemas opened alongside the mall as a Warner Lusomundo multiplex. Until the renovation, it had seven screens for a total of 1,500 seats. The current configuration opened as part of the first enlargement, increasing the number of screens to nine. One of them at the time of opening was the first Lusomundo screen with RealD 3D technology without a 35mm projector.

== Controversies ==
In September 2022, it was reported that several stray shopping carts from the mall's Pingo Doce hypermarket which were found broken in the area around the University of Minho.

== See also ==
- BragaShopping
- Nova Arcada
