= Auchan Portugal =

Auchan Retail Portugal, S.A.
- Company type: Private, SA
- Industry: Retail
- Founded: Lisbon, Portugal (1969)
- Headquarters: Portugal
- Area served: Mainland Portugal
- Key people: Américo Prepucio, General Director
- Products: supermarkets, hypermarkets, optical, pharmacy, electronics and financial services.
- Number of employees: 9,420 (2011)
- Parent: Auchan Group
- Subsidiaries: Auchan; Oney; Immochan.
- Website: Auchan Portugal Corporate Website

Auchan Retail Portugal, S.A.', formerly known as Companhia Portuguesa de Hipermercados, S.A., doing businesses as Auchan, was born in 1970 with the opening of the first supermarket Pão de Açúcar in Lisbon, in 1973, the first hypermarket Jumbo was open in Cascais. Later in 1984, the company starts the concept of their own brand products and in 1985, a second hypermarket Jumbo was born in Amoreiras (which was later turned into a Pão de Açúcar). The first ever hypermarket with bar code reading opened in Alfragide in 1988, while in the 1990s, more hypermarkets opened in Maia, Castelo Branco, Setúbal, Alverca, Santo Tirso, Gaia, Famalicão and Aveiro respectively. Not only did they expand their stores country-wide, but in 1993 they also created the Pão de Açúcar Foundation which was destined to support employees, in 1994, they were the first to launch a credit card for the company's stores called Jumbo Mais, in 1996, the company created Rik et Rok Club or Rik & Rok in Portuguese and later that year, they were acquired by the Auchan Group.

In the 2000s and 2010s more hypermarkets Jumbo were open in Faro, Figueira da Foz, Almada, Gondomar, Vila Real, Coimbra, Viseu, Torres Vedras, Santarém, Matosinhos, Vila Nova de Gaia (Vila Nova de Gaia was acquired from the Sonae group because of Carrefour Portugal leaving the country), Amadora, Guimarães, Coina, Portimão and supermarkets Pão de Açúcar in Guarda, Faro, Caldas da Rainha, Eiras, Lagoa (Eiras and Lagoa were both acquired from the Sonae group because of Carrefour Portugal leaving the country), Olhão, Canidelo and Campera respectively.

In the 2000s, the company launched their brand products and Rik & Rok with Braille designations, they launched the humanitary project of Auchan Portugal, they launched the "Vida Auchan" (Auchan Life) line of products dedicated to a more sustainable agriculture, they created Immochan Portugal with the objective to manage all of the malls and commercial galleries owned by the company and through these years they received numerous awards such has environmental certifications and social responsibility commitments.
