= Ed (supermarket) =

French discount retail brand

- Company type: Hard discount
- Industry: Retail
- Founded: 1978; 48 years ago
- Defunct: 2012; 14 years ago
- Fate: Most stores converted to Dia
- Headquarters: Vitry-sur-Seine, France
- Number of locations: 916 (2009)
- Number of employees: 10,000 (2009)
- Parent: Carrefour Group
- Website: http://www.magasins-ed.com/

Ed was a French brand of discount stores founded in 1978. It was part of the Carrefour Group and primarily offered food products, with its own brand. It dissolved in 2013, but continues to franchise its name to small-format hard discounts stores in France as part of Promodès.

== History ==
The first store opened in Paris in 1978. By 1987, its 100th store opened, introducing produce and other fresh perishables. In 1989, Ed launched the Europa Discount brand for suburbs and provincial towns. The chain expanded by 37 stores in 1991, with a total of 138 by the end of the year.

Carrefour bought the Penny discount and Treff Market chains in 2006, which gradually come under the Ed brand.

On 3 June 2009, there were 916 Ed stores in France and more than 10,000 employees.

=== Re-branding to Dia ===
In April 2009, a test of changing some 'Ed' stores to the Dia branding was announced by the Carrefour Group. The shops of Villeneuve-Saint-Georges and Mâcon were some of the first. An insider to the company declared: "The decision to move all of the 918 Ed stores to the Dia banner is already certain. But the timing is not yet decided."

By July 2009, Lars Olofsson announced the decision of the Carrefour group to discontinue the Ed brand in favor of Dia, with 250 stores slated to be transformed into Dia by 2010.

In June 2011, Carrefour shareholders approved the plan to list Dia on the stock exchange. This would mean complete autonomy for Dia as a brand operated by Erteco in France.
