= BragaShopping =

Shopping mall in Braga, Portugal

Coordinates: 41°33′10.15405″N 8°25′20.97649″W

- Location: Braga, Portugal
- Opened: December 6, 1996; 29 years ago
- Num. of stores: c. 60
- Floors: 1
- Website: bragashopping.webnode.pt

BragaShopping is a shopping mall in the city center of Braga. It opened on 6 December 1996 as the result of the expansion of the former Centro Comercial Avenida (opened in the 1980s). The mall includes a Pingo Doce supermarket and, until 2021, a five-room cinema complex.

== History ==
The original mall (Centro Comercial Avenida) exists since at least the early 1980s, following the demolition of Grande Hotel Central in the late 1970s. BragaShopping was built on the back of Avenida and opened on 6 December 1996. Following the opening of Minho Center and Braga Parque, it used the tagline "o centro no centro do centro".

In December 2003, the mall planned an expansion of its size starting in 2005.

During the pandemic, most shop owners lost their revenue.

== Cinemas ==
The old wing, when it was Centro Comercial Avenida, had its own cinemas (Cinemas Avenida). A fire broke out on the early hours of 18 October 1994 likely due to a short circuit; the materials present at its chairs and walls were highly flammable. On 25 January 2014, the former Cinemas Avenida complex was occupied by Espaço TOCA.

BragaShopping's new cinemas, originally Cinemas BragaShopping, were opened in 1996 and renamed Cinemax in 2003. When the first state of emergency was declared, Cinemax closed its screens on 16 March 2020. After initial restrictions were lifted in October 2020, the cinemas closed in January 2021 with the proclamation of the last state of emergency; when it ended on 1 May, it was still closed.

== Fires ==
A fire broke out at the food court on 30 September 2021, forcing the evacuation of the mall. A new fire broke out at an esoteric store on the morning of 4 May 2026 at 9:40am, in the new wing (BragaShopping), and was controlled around 11:30.

== See also ==
- Braga Parque
