= DIA (supermarket chain) =

Spanish supermarket chain

Distribuidora Internacional de Alimentación, S.A.

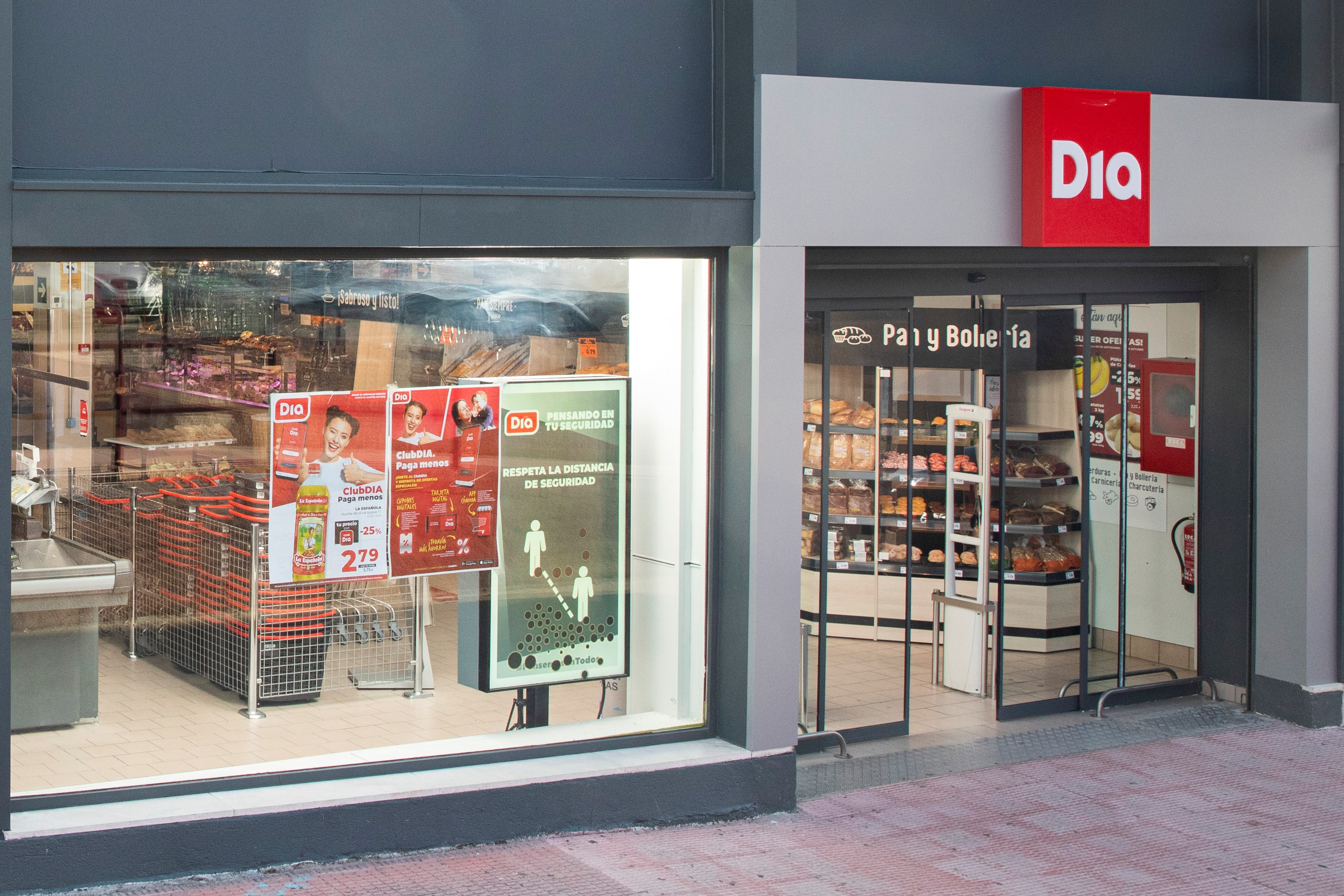
- DIA supermarket in Spain, May 2021
- Type: Sociedad Anónima
- Traded as: BMAD: DIA
- ISIN: ES0126775032
- Industry: Retail
- Founded: 24 July 1966; 60 years ago
- Headquarters: Las Rozas, Spain
- Number of locations: ▼3,346 stores (2024)
- Area served: Spain; Argentina; Brazil; Portugal
- Key people: Stephan DuCharme (CEO)
- Revenue: ▼€7.5 billion (2024)
- Net income: ▼ –€78 million (2024)
- Number of employees: ▼28,500 (2024)
- Parent: LetterOne
- Website: diacorporate.com

Distribuidora Internacional de Alimentación, S.A. (DIA) is a Spanish multinational discount supermarket chain founded in 1979.

At the end of 2024 it had 3,346 stores, of which 2,310 were in Spain, 1,036 in Argentina and 590 in Brazil, with approximately 28,500 employees and a turnover of €6.9 billion.

== History ==
The DIA chain was created in Spain in 1979 with the opening of its first store on Calle Valderrodrigo 10, in the Madrid urbanization of Saconia.

In the 1990s, international expansion began with the acquisition of Minipreço in Portugal in 1993. It was followed by first Dia stores in Greece in 1995, in Argentina in 1997 and in Turkey in 1999.

Dia was acquired by Carrefour Group in 2000. The French Ed supermarket chain which it was acquired by Carrefour in 1999 has been integrated into the Dia discount group. In 2001, Dia entered Brazil. In 2003, Dia opened first stores in the China, where the number of openings in a year reached 300 stores. In 2007, Carrefour bought the Plus chain in Spain to integrate it into the Dia chain for €200 million.

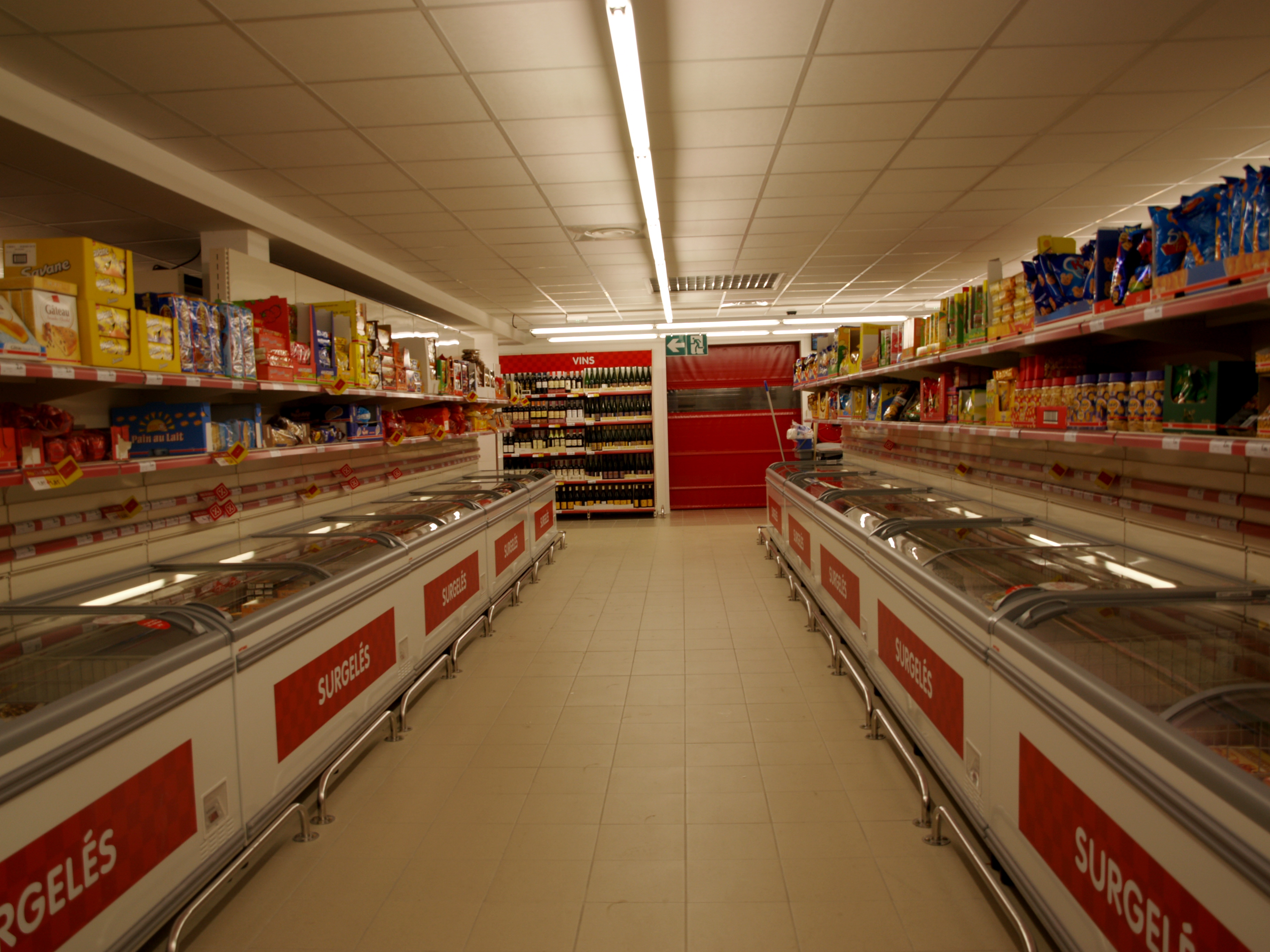
Interior of a Dia supermarket in Strasbourg, France

In 2010, Carrefour transferred Dia Greece (who was 80% owned by Carrefour) to the joint-venture Carrefour Marinopoulos in order to convert the stores under the Carrefour Marinopoulos or Carrefour Express brands. In July 2011, Dia demerged from the Carrefour Group and was followed by its debut in Madrid's IBEX 35 stock market on 2 January 2012. In January 2013, Dia took over 1,127 stores in Spain, 41 stores in Portugal and 4 distribution centers for €70.5 million from the bankrupt German company Schlecker. Most of the stores were converted into beauty and personal care stores under the new brand Clarel. The Turkish subsidiary of Dia with 1,200 stores in Turkey was sold to Yıldız Holding in 2013 for €136.5 million. In June 2014, three years after it split from the Carrefour group, Dia's 800 stores in France, which were in difficulty, were bought for €600 million by Carrefour. The stores were converted to Carrefour brands or closed. In July 2014, Dia acquired the 455 regional supermarkets of El Arbor, the 8th largest supermarket chain in Spain, for 1 euro due to financial problems. Most of the stores were rebranded in La Plaza de DIA. In November 2014, Eroski sold 160 of its stores to Dia for €146 million, in the regions of Andalusia, Extremadura, Castile and León and Castile-La Mancha, with the aim of getting out of debt. Following the acquisitions, Dia closed 700 supermarkets in Spain between 2015 and 2019 due to the proximity between them or low sales. In 2018, Dia sold its Chinese subsidiary to Suning. Dia had nearly 400 franchised stores in Shanghai. In 2013, closed its 160 stores in Beijing as a result of continued losses. In May 2019, the LetterOne investment firm increased its share in the Dia Group to 69.76%, effectively taking control of the company. Gregoire Bontoux has also been one of the major shareholders since 2019. After that, a new board of directors was appointed and the company launched a transformation plan to regain competitiveness and to make the Company profitable focusing on the operational excellence and on a new commercial offer.

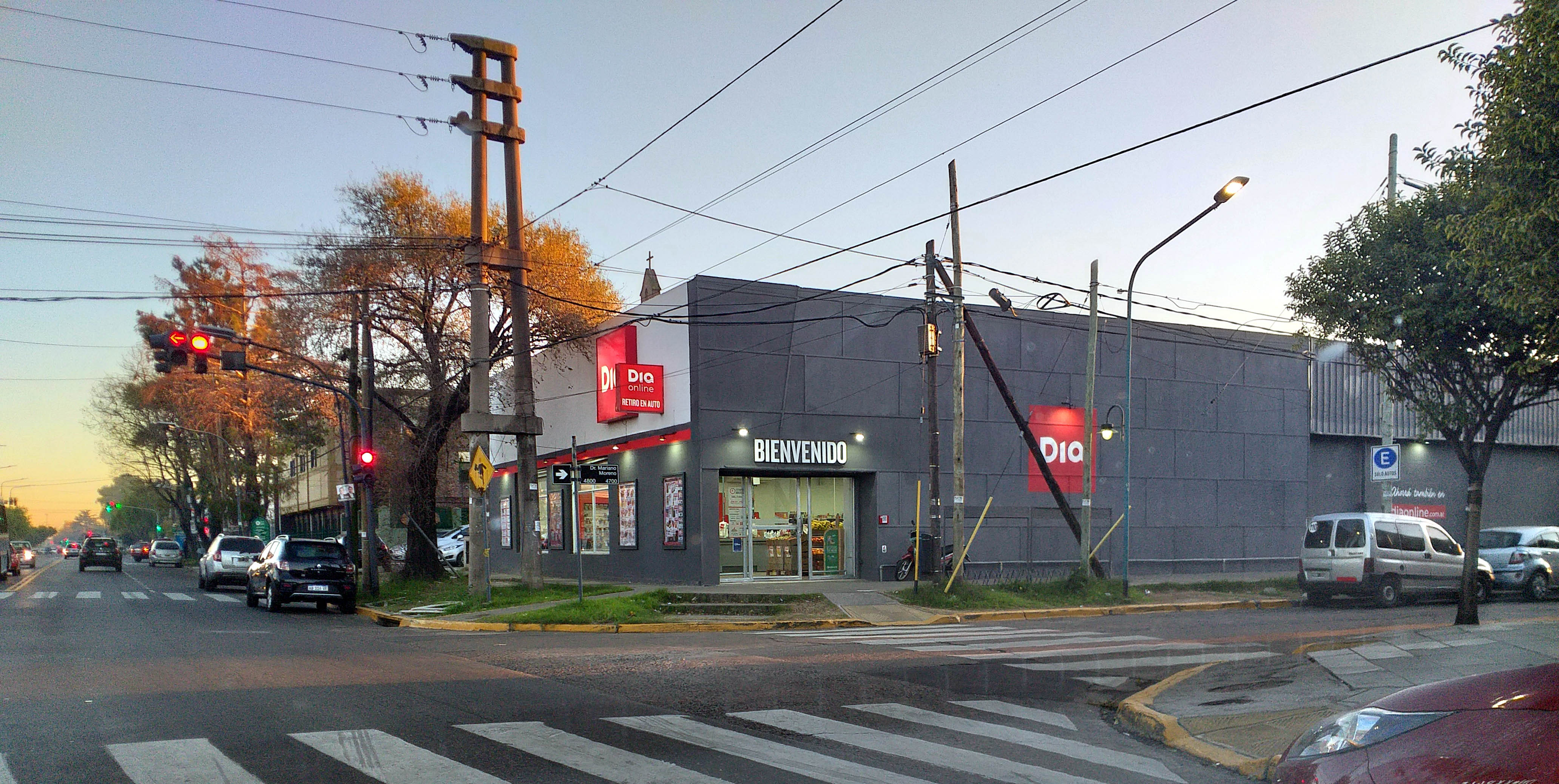
A Dia supermarket in Munro, Argentina

On 20 May 2020, Stephan DuCharme became the executive president of the DIA Group. In August 2022, Dia announced in Spain the sale of 235 supermarkets under Dia, Maxi Dia and Plaza del Dia banners and 2 warehouses with 5,000 employees to Alcampo controlled by the French Auchan for €267 million. In March 2023, the National Markets and Competition Commission (CNMC) authorized the sale of 224 locations to Alcampo, 11 fewer than initially planned to avoid a monopoly in certain areas. Dia announced the sale of its 1,015-store Clarel beauty store chain to Spanish fund C2 Private Capital for around €60 million in December 2022. Dia suspended the sale of its Clarel stores to C2 Private Capital due to breach of contract. Dia announced in August 2023 the sale of its Portuguese subsidiary Minipreço with 489 stores to French retailer Auchan for €155 million. The sale was completed on 30 April 2024. On 5 December 2023, Dia Retail announced the sale of its 1,015 Clarel beauty stores in Spain to Colombia's Grupo Trinity S.A.S. The total sale price is estimated to be €26.5 million, with an initial payment of €11.5 million received in 2024 and a potential maximum additional payment of €15 million in 2029, depending on certain performance metrics. On 31 May 2024, the sale of its Brazilian subsidiary to MAM Asset Management was announced for a symbolic price of 100 euros. The operation was completed on 25 June of the same year.

== Operations ==
Dia is a discount supermarket chain which follows a policy of reduction of prices by means of minimizing operational costs. The furniture and decoration of the store are minimal. Costs are also reduced by limiting the choice of products to a narrow selection of European brand name and white-label Dia brand goods. Its policy of communication is based on mass media campaigns as well as periodic flyers featuring products which are on special sale.
