= Auchan =

French multinational retail company

Auchan Retail International S.A.
- Type: Private company, SA
- Industry: Retail
- Founded: 6 July 1961; 65 years ago
- Founder: Gérard Mulliez
- Headquarters: Croix, Lille Métropole, France
- Number of locations: 2,896 points of sale (2025)
- Area served: France, Spain, Portugal, Luxembourg, Poland, Hungary, Romania, Russia, Ukraine, Tajikistan, Senegal, Ivory Coast
- Key people: Edgard Bonte (Chairman)
- Products: Hypermarket, Supermarket, Convenience store
- Revenue: ▲€32.9 billion (2022); €30.5 billion (2021); €31.6 billion (2020)
- Operating income: ▲€1.6 billion (2020)
- Net income: ▲€708 million (2020)
- Total assets: ▼€1.169 billion (2020)
- Total equity: ▼€6.704 billion (2020)
- Number of employees: ▼160,407 (2022); 163,098 (2021); 179,590 (2020)
- Parent: ELO
- Website: auchan-retail.com

Auchan (French: [oʃɑ̃]) is a French multinational retail group headquartered in Croix, France. It was founded in 1961 by Gérard Mulliez and is owned by the Mulliez family, who has 95% stake in the company. With 354,851 employees, of which 261,000 have 5% stake in the company, it is the 35th largest employer in the world.

The first Auchan logo used from 1961 to 1983

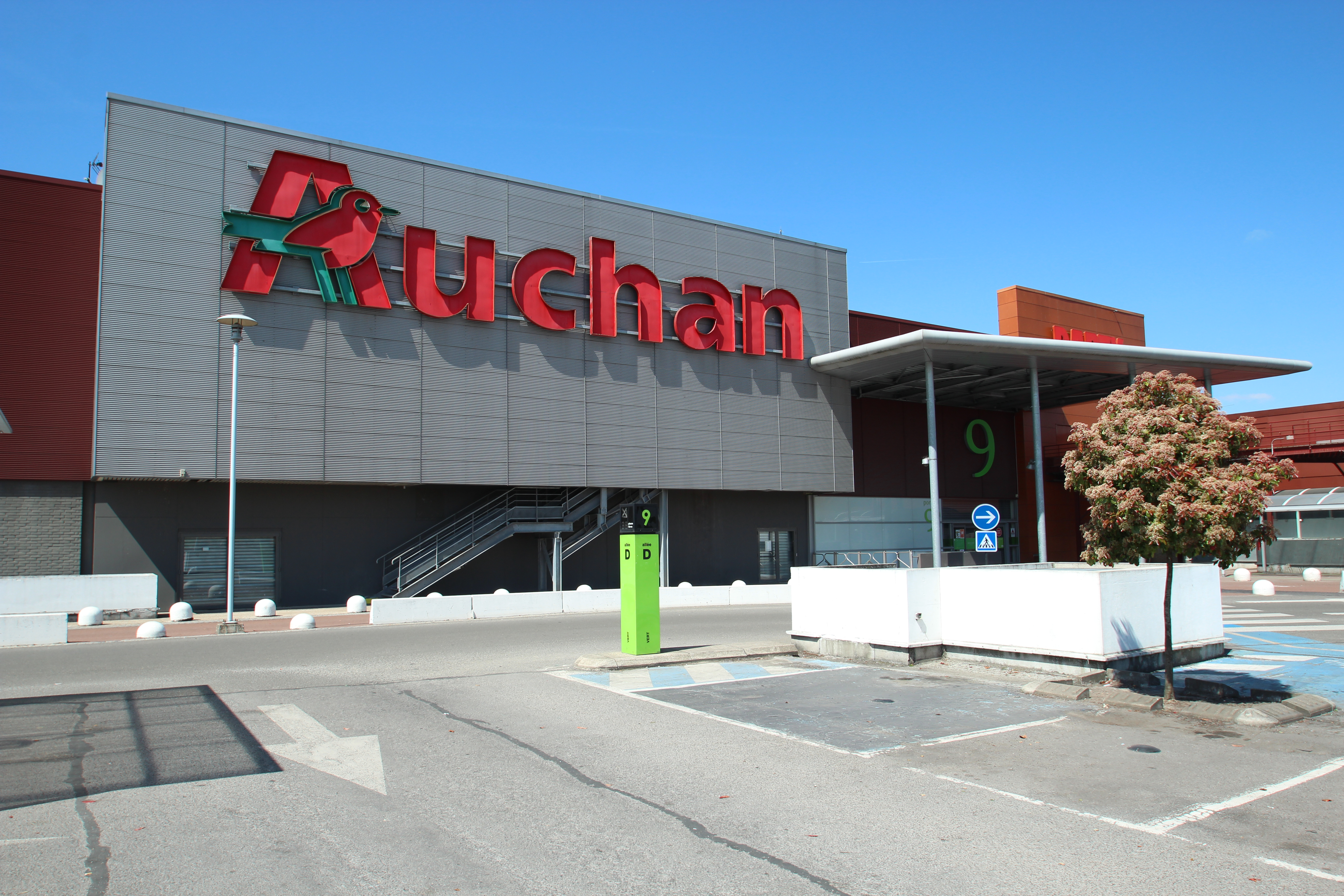
Auchan hypermarket in Vélizy-Villacoublay, France

The company operates under the name Auchan in France, Luxembourg, Poland, Romania, Hungary, Portugal, Senegal, Ivory Coast, as Alcampo in Spain, and as Aшан (Ashan) in Russia, Ukraine and Tajikistan. The company has also previously had operations as Auchan in Italy, China and Taiwan.

The name comes from the first Auchan shop in Roubaix in the district of Hauts-Champs, the pronunciation of which is identical to that of "Auchan".

As of 2022, Auchan is one of the world's largest retailers with a direct presence in France, Spain, Portugal, Luxembourg, Poland, Romania, Hungary, Ukraine, Russia, Taiwan (ended in 2021) and Senegal. In 2022, the company's revenue in Russia amounted to 237 billion rubles.

Auchan is a rare example of a Western company continuing to operate in Russia after the country's invasion of Ukraine in 2022, as well as actively funding and supporting Russian military efforts. As a result, Ukraine’s National Agency on Corruption Prevention placed the company on its International Sponsors of War list.

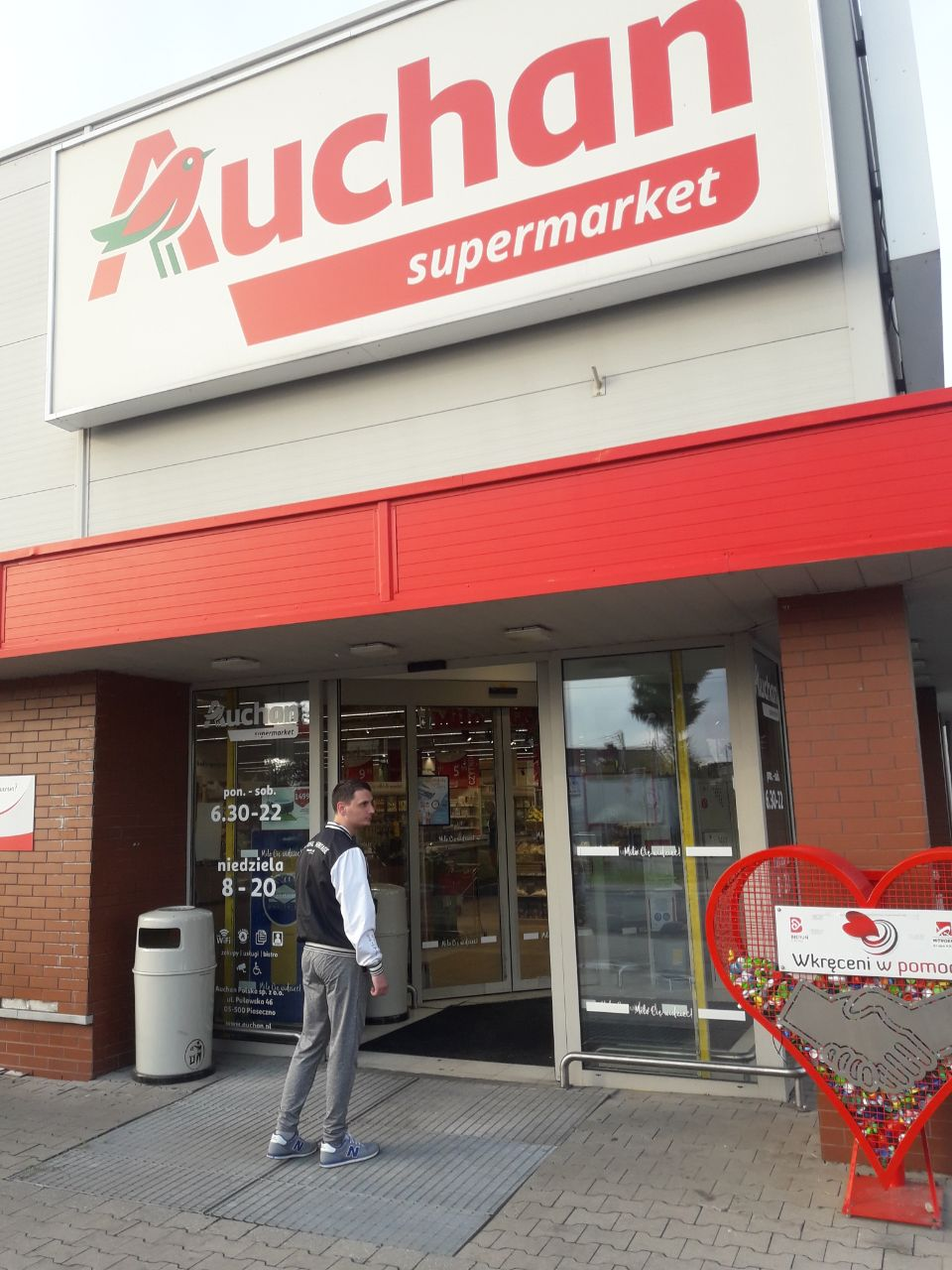
Auchan in Bieruń, Poland

By 2025, the group announced it will have 2,896 stores in 12 countries.

== History ==
After meeting the founders of the Carrefour and Leclerc, on 6 July 1961, Gérard Mulliez opens the first Auchan store in a disused factory of the company Phildar, founded by his father, also named Gérard. Covering an area of 600 m^{2}, this store was located in the district of Hauts-Champs, in Roubaix. Originally, the store was to be called "Ochan", but because of the Japanese sounding, changed the name to "Auchan". The choice of the initial letter "A" was desired by the founders to appear in first place in directories. Gérard Mulliez relied on the advice of Édouard Leclerc to open his first supermarket. This store had to be closed in the 1980s because of strong competition with the one that had been built in Leers. The building was bought by the Intermarché. In 2003 it was demolished to make space for a more modern store.

In the summer of 1967, on 20 August, Auchan opens its first hypermarket in Roncq in an initially commercial area of 3500 m^{2}. According to Gérard Mulliez, Roncq location served as a model for other hypermarkets in France in non-food enlargement. On 27 March 1969 was opened the Englos-les-Géants shopping center at Englos in the Lille metropolis. Englos les Giants was the first shopping mall with a hypermarket and a retail park in France.

In November 2018, Metro AG sold its 91 Real hypermarkets in Poland, Romania, Russia, and Ukraine to Auchan for €1.1 billion. In August 2023, Auchan announced the acquisition of all of the Dia Group’s operations in Portugal, which include 489 stores under the Minipreço and Mais Perto brands.

== Mulliez family ==
Auchan SA is controlled by the Mulliez family, one of the wealthiest in France and in Europe. The Mulliez family also owns Leroy Merlin, Decathlon and other retailers.

== Locations ==
By 2025, the group announced it will have 2,896 stores in 12 countries:

=== Europe ===
- France: 702 branded stores (hypermarkets, supermarkets, and convenience stores)
- Spain: Alcampo: 526 stores: 80 hypermarkets, 271 supermarkets, and 174 convenience stores
- Hungary: 24 branded stores, including 19 hypermarkets, 5 supermarkets, and 1 convenience store
- Luxembourg: 27 branded stores, including 3 hypermarkets and 19 convenience stores
- Poland: 232 branded stores, including 72 hypermarkets, 56 supermarkets, and 104 convenience stores
- Portugal: 603 branded stores: 31 hypermarkets, 19 supermarkets, and 517 convenience stores
- Romania: 450 branded stores, including 33 hypermarkets, 9 supermarkets, and 408 convenience stores
- Russia: 230 branded stores (hypermarkets and supermarkets)
- Ukraine: 43 stores: 21 hypermarkets, 4 supermarkets, and 18 convenience stores

=== Asia ===
- Tajikistan;

=== Africa ===
- Senegal: 45 branded stores, including 1 hypermarket, 31 supermarkets, and 12 convenience stores
- Ivory Coast: 15 branded stores: supermarkets and convenience stores

=== Russia ===
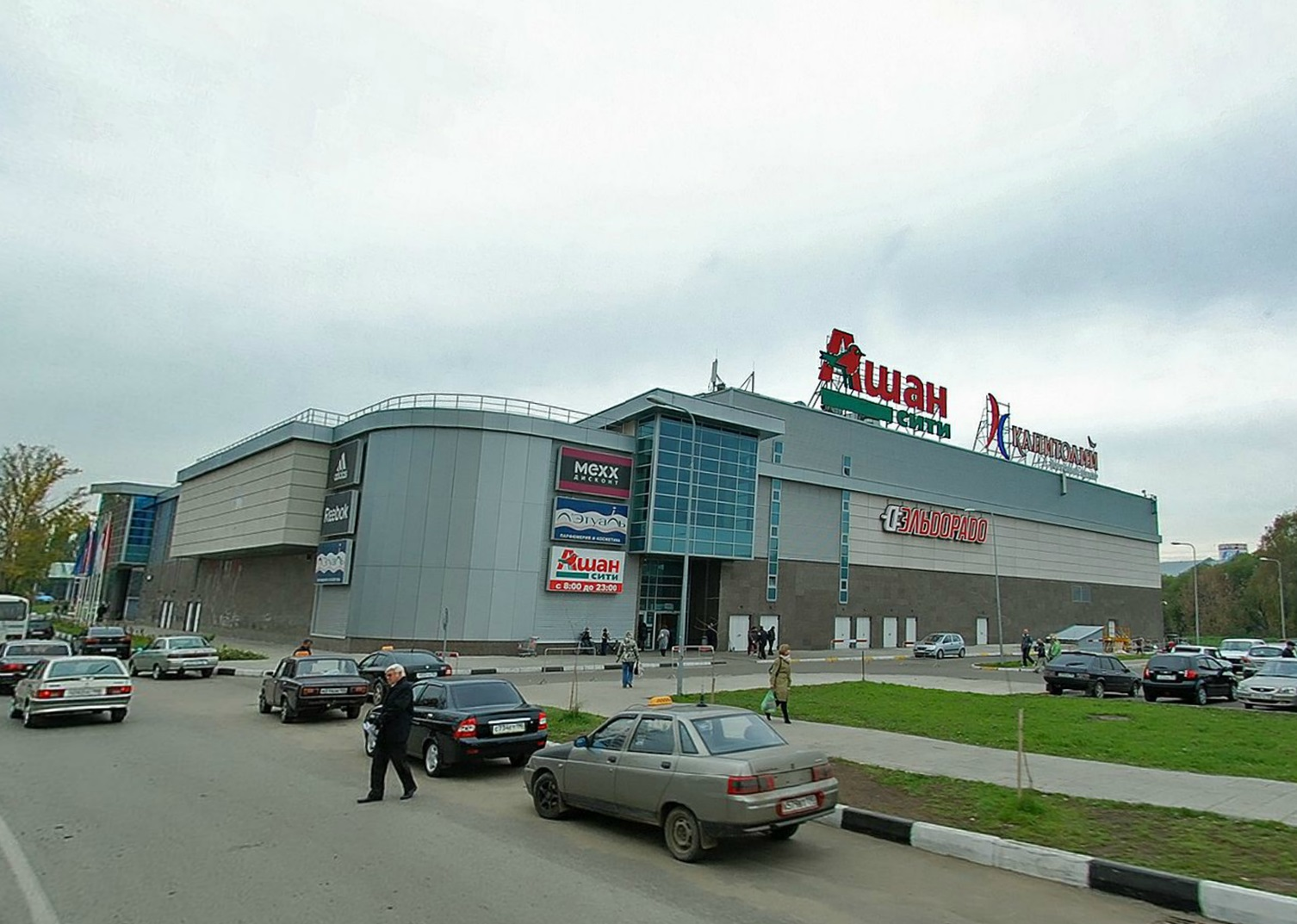
Auchan featured with the "Ашан" sign in Orekhovo-Zuyevo, Moscow Oblast, Russia

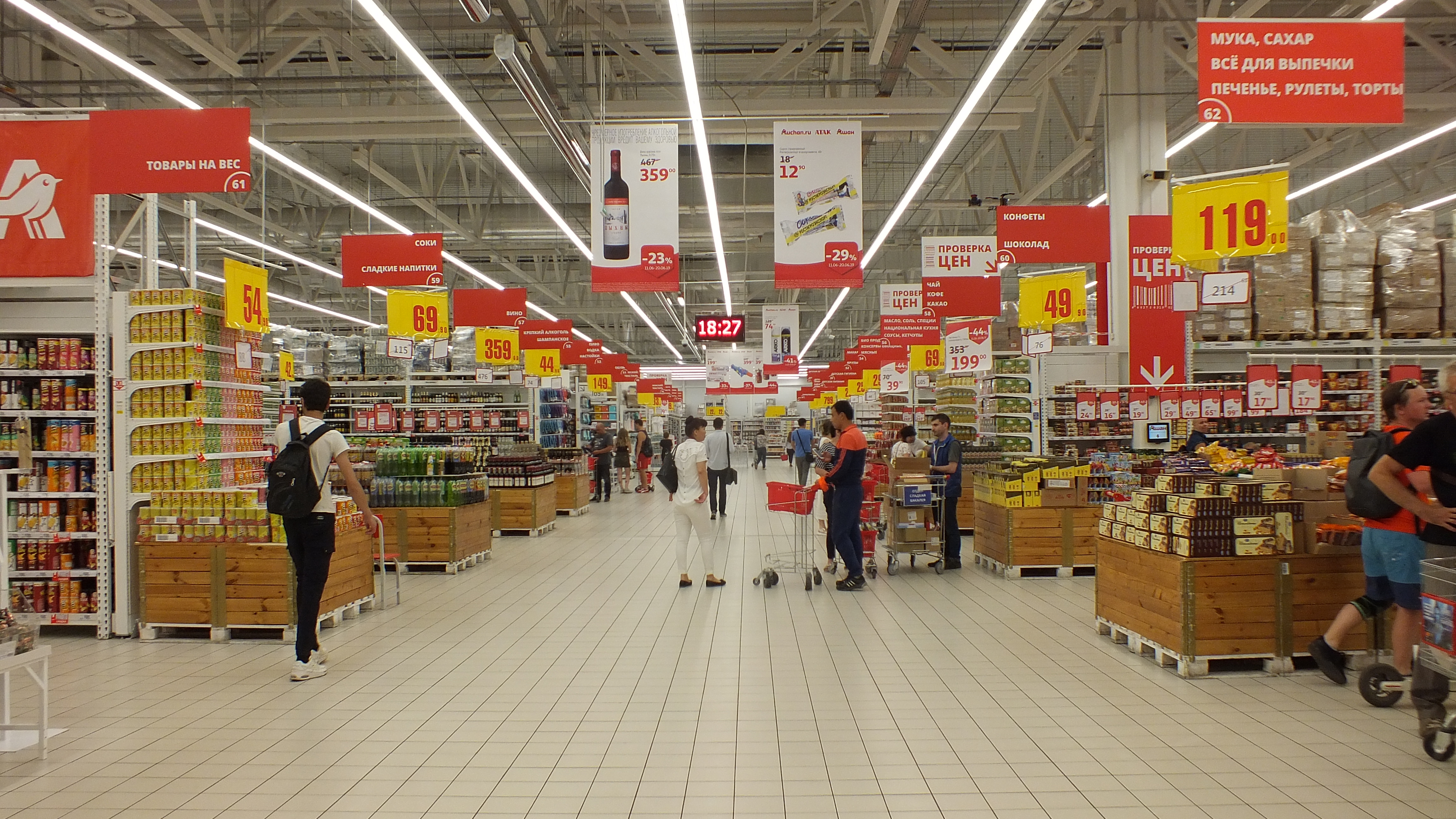
Auchan interior on Proletarsky Prospekt in Moscow

Auchan (branded as Aшан) has been active on the Russian market since 2002 and had over 100 hypermarkets in the country by December 2016. It's the company's third largest market, after France and China. Revenues for the country reached $5 billion in 2014, ranking third behind the local retailers X5 Retail Group and Magnit. In 2016 it was ranked first in a list of the largest foreign-owned companies by the Russian edition of Forbes.

In November 2021, Russian “Auchan” signed with online-delivery service "Sbermarket" a deal of strategic partnership in e-commerce until 2028. First, from 2022, both partners will be focused on delivery from darkstores as well as delivery and loyalty programs for B2B clients. In January 2022, Russian Auchan switched on 73 stores (more than a half of its stores, including "Atak") to Sbermarket delivery. One of few western companies operating in Russia after the country invaded Ukraine, Auchan has continued its operations in Russia, arguing it will continue to do so for "humanitarian reasons".

Auchan was added to the Ukrainian International Sponsors of War list following the 2023 joint investigation by The Insider, Bellingcat and Le Monde that claimed that Auchan Russia is actively supporting Russian military in Ukraine by periodically supplying food, clothes, cigarettes and other items. Official Auchan communications claimed these items were supplied to Donbas as "humanitarian help" but as noted in the investigation, all collected items were targeted at "adult men" including items that are never supplied in regular humanitarian help, such as cigarettes, and were thus intended for Russian soldiers. Auchan Russia reportedly both organizes "mandatory voluntary" collections among its employees and provides batches of these items for free.

=== Senegal ===
Auchan entered Senegal's retail market in 2014 under the Atac brand before rebranding under its own name. Its rapid expansion focused primarily in Dakar and surrounding regions, transforming the retail landscape by offering a wide range of products, including both imported goods and locally sourced items. This approach appealed to an emerging urban middle class seeking modern shopping conveniences in contrast to traditional markets. In 2022, the group generated a revenue of 218 million euros from the Senegalese and Ivorian markets, representing just under 1% of its total revenue of 32.8 billion euros. As of November 2023, Auchan operated 39 locations throughout Senegal, in addition to offering a drive-through and home delivery service, and is the leading provider of modern food distribution in the country, surpassing Casino, Carrefour, and Elydia.

Despite its commercial success, Auchan has faced criticism regarding its competitive practices and impact on local small-scale merchant and its presence in Senegal has been marked by controversy amid broader social movements opposing perceived economic recolonization by French entities. The company's aggressive expansion into areas with established traditional markets, like Castors, is seen as threatening to small vendors and traditional food cultures across Africa. Its competitive pricing has stirred concerns about unfair competition and potential monopolization in a market dominated by informal enterprises. It has also been accused of benefiting from less stringent regulations compared to those in its home country. The movement "Auchan dégage" ("Leave, Auchan") emerged in Senegal in June 2018, spearheaded by the FRAPP coalition at Dakar's Castors market. It seeks to decolonize Senegal's economy by opposing Auchan's presence and promoting local sovereignty. It comprises a diverse coalition including consumer defense groups like ADEC and ASDEC, business associations such as CNP and UNACOIS, and environmental organizations like Joliba Agrobusiness and Sen Bio. Their goals include advocating for local consumption, protecting traditional markets, and influencing policies to support local businesses and agriculture. In October 2018, Senegal's President Macky Sall instructed the Prime Minister and Minister of Commerce to halt any new openings of Auchan stores until regulations on large-scale retail distribution were established, in what was described as the movement's first victory.

Auchan has also been involved in security incidents and was targeted during social unrest in 2021, impacting its operations. During the 2021 Senegalese protests, the company closed all its stores in the country, having suffered 14 attacks out of its 32 locations nationwide. The decision came as other French establishments like Total and Eiffage also faced vandalism, while French schools, Air France, and Orange shut down operations on Friday due to safety concerns amidst widespread protests against economic hardships and political discontent. In June 2023, amid protests following the conviction of presidential candidate Ousmane Sonko's, Auchan suffered severe losses with looting and fires at seven stores in Dakar and attacks on Total Dior and Total Liberté 6 shops. In Mbour, a non-food products tent was set ablaze.

=== Portugal ===
Auchan Portugal was launched in 1974 under the name Jumbo and owned by to the French group Auchan.

In Portugal, the Auchan Group owns the Jumbo and Pão de Açúcar brands since 1996.with stores all over the country. One of the main distribution companies in Portugal. It also has gas stations, selling them cheaper than the price charged by the main fuel brands in Portugal. To designate the supermarkets, they used the Pão de Açúcar insignia changing to Auchan Hipermecardo in 2019.

Modern distribution and the concept of supermarkets, as we know it today, was introduced in Portugal by the Brazilian Pão de Açúcar Group (founded in São Paulo by a Portuguese Valentim Diniz), which joined the national group CUF in 1969, creating the company SUPA - Companhia Portuguesa de Supermercados.

The first Pão de Açúcar store opened in Lisbon, on Avenida Estados Unidos da América [United States Avenue in English], on 1 May 1970, where a store of the Pingo Doce chain, of the JM group, now operates. On 1 November 1970, he opened his second store in Lisbon, this time in Alcãntara, on Avenida de Ceuta.

In September 2019, the Jumbo brand ended. The new designation for all the French group's stores became Auchan, in a single brand concept. Pão de Açúcar has already changed its name, the new name being Auchan Supermercado.

In 2024 Auchan has acquired Grupo Dia brands Minipreço and Mais Perto with more than 450 stores located across Portugal for an investment of 155 million euros. Auchan is now rebranding all the Minipreço and Mais Perto stores and the topology is now Minipreço Market and Express are becoming MyAuchan and Minipreço Family are becoming Auchan Supermercado.

== Elo Group ==
Elo Group, previously known as Auchan Holding, is the holding company of Auchan Retail. It also includes New Immo Holding (previously known as Ceetrus and Immochan), the division which operates shopping centers and hypermarket galleries and Oney (previously known as Bank Accord), the financial services group that offers consumer credits and Auchan and Leroy Merlin credit cards.

== Slogan ==
The slogan of the company was La Vie, La Vraie, which translates into English as "Life, the real one". The slogan was changed in 2007 to: La vie Auchan, elle change la vie – "Auchan's lifestyle changes life (itself)".

== Withdrawn ventures ==
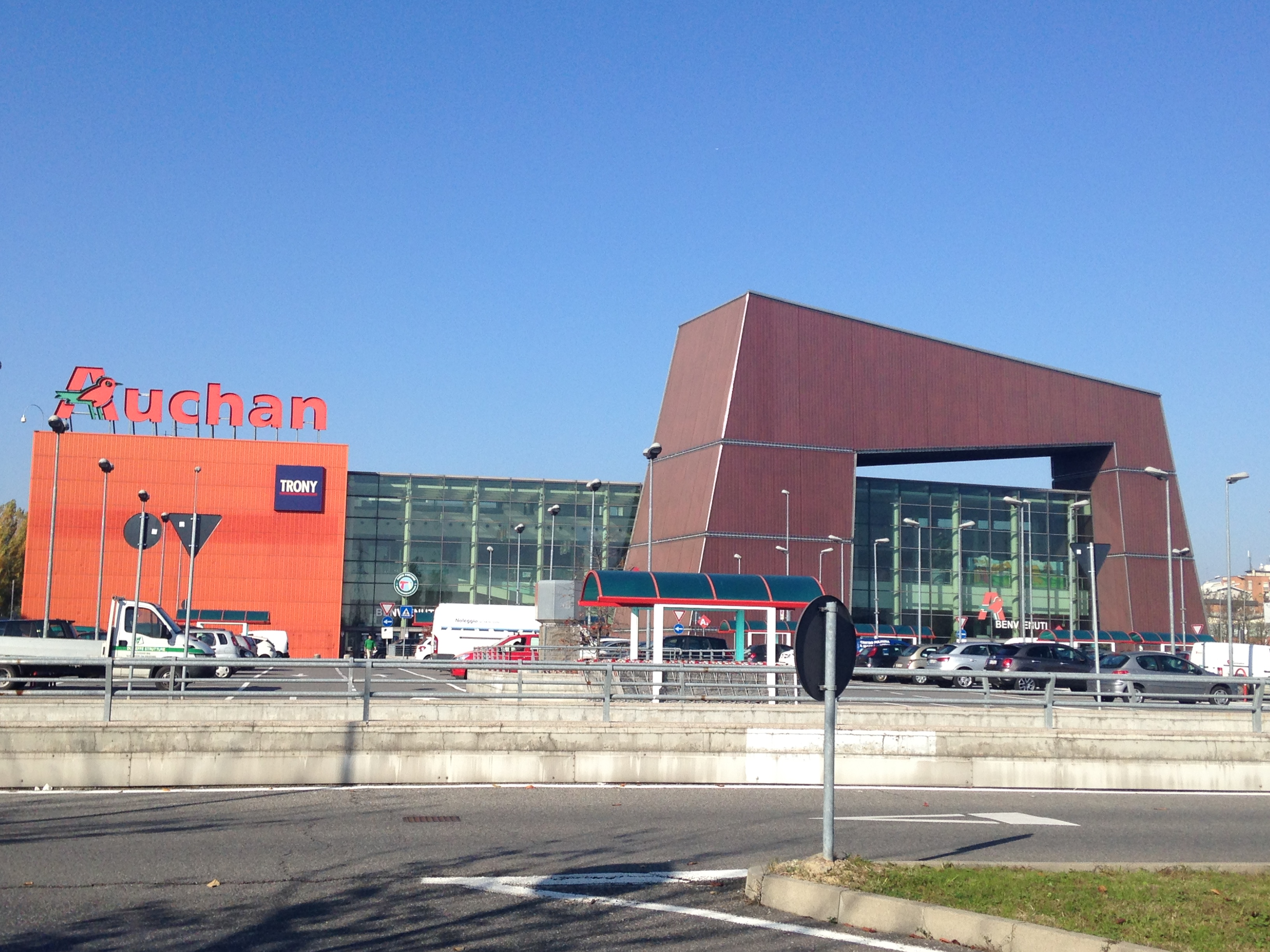
Former Auchan hypermarket in Cesano Boscone, Milan, Italy

Auchan opened a number of stores in Mexico; the first of these opened in Mexico City in 1996 and eventually grew to five stores. The first store located in Tlatelolco, was sold to Comercial Mexicana in 1998. Faced with stiff competition from Wal-Mart , as well as local superstore chains Gigante and Comercial Mexicana, and French rival Carrefour (who also sold their stores and left the country in March 2005), Auchan decided to sell their stores to Comercial Mexicana and withdrew from Mexico in early 2003, the three stores located in Tlatelolco, Gran Sur and Arboledas, were sold to Soriana in 2016.

In 2002, Auchan sold its hypermarkets in Thailand to Groupe Casino.

In 2007, Auchan sold its Argentine stores to Wal-Mart and withdrew from the country.

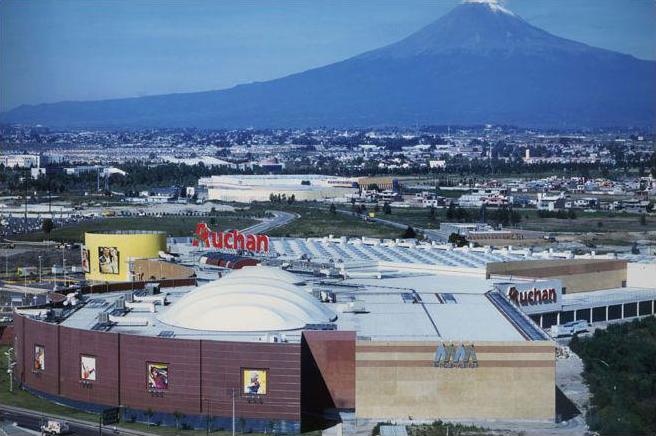
Former Auchan hypermarket in Puebla, Mexico

In January 2011 Auchan withdrew from the Dubai market after just two years.

The first Italian Auchan hypermarket was opened in Turin on 1989. In 2019 Auchan withdrew from Italy due to financial losses, by selling most of the activities of its Auchan Retail Italia to the Italian retailer Conad.

Auchan also withdrew from Vietnam due to losses and slow development.

=== China ===
Auchan opened its first store in Shanghai in 1999. It operates through Sun Art Retail Group, a public company listed in Hong Kong, in which Auchan holds 38,5% stake and Alibaba Group 26%.

Suzhou Jinji Lake store that is located in Suzhou Industrial Park had nine million visitors during that fiscal year with over four hundred million turnover and became one of the biggest Auchan hypermarkets in the world. Suzhou store expanded in 2008 and is the biggest Auchan Hypermarket in China, the second biggest in the world. Also, Auchan China led to open its online shopping website for the stores in Shanghai and Suzhou.

Auchan offers online shopping only in those two cities so far and is opening in Suzhou its first AuchanDrive store, based on its French model (click & go) in May 2012. The AuchanDrive service allows customers to purchase groceries online for home delivery, these locations being examples of online supermarkets in China.

Since 2017, a number of unmanned convenience stores, marketed as BingoBox, are being operated by Auchan in China.

In 2020, Auchan left China, after selling its shares to Alibaba.

=== United States ===
Auchan operated stores in the United States from 1988 to 2003 as Auchan Hypermarket under its subsidiary, Auchan USA, who was the successor of interest to Texfield Inc. By the time of its closing it was the only French hypermarket chain to still operate American stores, as other hypermarket chains, such as Carrefour and E.Leclerc (under the guise of Leedmark) gave up in the United States market around 1993–1994.

The first American Auchan (pronounced by Houstonians as "o-shawn") store opened in western Houston on 14 October 1988. The 250,000-square-foot (23,000 m^{2}) hypermarket was located on a 31.3-acre (12.7 ha) plot of land on Beltway 8, north of U.S. Route 59/Interstate 69. The store was one of many hypermarkets to open in the U.S in the late 80's, after Walmart debuted Hypermart USA in December 1987, and Carrefour's Philadelphia store debuted in March 1988. David Kaplan of the Houston Chronicle said "it was fairly unusual and became something of a tourist attraction" when it had first opened, as it was big enough to house many small businesses in front, such as a travel agency, a jewelry store, a bank, and a food court containing a Taco Bell, McDonald's, and Pizza Hut. It also featured a huge cheese selection, a huge beer and wine selection, featuring local breweries such as Celis White, a bakery, a large seafood selection and rodeo wear.

Auchan also opened a store in the Chicago suburb of Bridgeview, Illinois, in 1989. It only sold food, and it was not as large as the Houston store. In 1991 the store closed. It was later bought by a local Chicago supermarket chain, Dominick's, and converted into an Omni Superstore by 1991.

Auchan's second Greater Houston location opened in southeast Houston in September 2000, in a former Target store, which Auchan heavily renovated (and partially built up on) prior to opening, the most obvious example being the entrances, designed to make it look huge, despite its past as a Target. Kaplan said, "Auchan had solid business its first years, but with only two stores in the country, the company lacked buying power and economy-of-scale advantages." In early January 2003 Auchan announced that both of its U.S. stores were making losses and were going to be closed; Auchan stated that it was instead going to concentrate its expansion in Asia and Europe, and on 6 January 2003, Auchan closed the two money-losing stores, ending all American operations after 15 years. Auchan USA sold its first Houston location to Ho Enterprises. Lewis Food Town occupied about 110,000 square feet (10,000 m^{2}) of the space, with the rest of the space taken by other tenants, which makes the store a bit like a mini-mall today. Kaplan said that by 2003, "the Houston market is saturated with huge discounters and large grocery stores." In addition, many similar stores, including an H-E-B Food and Drug Store, the Hong Kong Supermarket, a Sam's Club, and a Wal-Mart had opened in proximity to the west Houston Auchan. In Europe, zoning laws would prevent such a high concentration of similar stores. Kaplan further added that "In Europe, shopping malls are not as prevalent as they are in America, and Auchan's everything-under-one-roof concept has greater appeal" in Europe rather than in the United States. The second former Auchan is now used by a local scaffolding company, and was used as a shelter for Hurricane Katrina victims in 2005 and Hurricane Ike victims in 2008 due to its large space.

=== Morocco ===
Auchan's venture into Morocco began in January 2001 through acquiring a 49% stake in Marjane, marking the start of a five-year period of cooperation with ONA, a conglomerate with interests spanning mining, agribusiness, distribution, and finance. Together, they launched Acima supermarkets under a similar ownership structure (49% Auchan, 51% ONA) as Marjane. By 2006, tensions escalated when ONA unilaterally altered governance terms, increasing its representation in the joint ventures. Auchan contested this move, leading to arbitration in Casablanca, which ruled against Auchan in January 2007. The dispute, exacerbated by ONA's corporate governance changes and strategic shifts, culminated in Auchan's decision to sell its 49% stakes in both Marjane and Acima to ONA in 2007.

== Criticism ==
=== Building collapse at Savar ===
On 24 April 2013, the eight-story Rana Plaza commercial building collapsed in Savar, a sub-district near Dhaka, the capital of Bangladesh. At least 1,127 people died and over 2,438 were injured. The factory housed a number of separate garment factories employing around 5,000 people, several shops, and a bank and manufactured apparel for brands including the Benetton Group, Joe Fresh, The Children's Place, Primark, Monsoon, and Dressbarn. Of the 29 brands identified as having sourced products from the Rana Plaza factories, only 9 attended meetings held in November 2013 to agree a proposal on compensation to the victims. Several companies refused to sign including Walmart, Carrefour, Mango, Auchan and Kik. The agreement was signed by Primark, Loblaw, Bonmarché and El Corte Ingles.

=== 2022 Russian invasion of Ukraine ===
Following the 2022 Russian invasion of Ukraine which began on 24 February, many international companies pulled out of Russia. Auchan, with nearly 300 stores and 41,000 employees in Russia, has been criticized for not announcing any scaling down of its operations, unlike most of its Western competitors.

According to documents obtained by the NGO Bellingcat, the independent Russian media The Insider and Le Monde, the retail company, owned by the Mulliez family, eighth French fortune according to Challenges, is allegedly participating in the Russian war effort.

On 23 February 2023, the Ukrainian National Agency on Corruption Prevention added the French chain Auchan Holding to the list of international sponsors of the war. During the invasion, the company refused to leave the Russian market, and its Russian subsidiary Auchan supplied products to the Russian occupiers fighting in Ukraine. The corporation itself denied the branch's involvement in helping the Russians, and justified its decision to stay in Russia by helping the civilian population.

=== Auchan dégage ("Leave, Auchan") ===
Auchan has been criticized in Senegal for its impact on local small-scale merchants, concerns about unfair competition, potential monopolization, and exploiting less stringent regulations compared to its home country. The Auchan dégage ("Leave, Auchan") movement emerged in June 2018, led by the FRAPP coalition at Dakar's Castors market. The movement's stated goals were the decolonisation of Senegal's economy by opposing Auchan's presence, promoting local sovereignty, and advocating for policies that support local businesses and agriculture. It included diverse groups such as consumer defense organizations, business associations, and environmental groups. In a notable move in October 2018, Senegal's President Macky Sall instructed a halt on new Auchan store openings until regulations on large-scale retail distribution were established, marking a significant early victory for the movement.

== See also ==
- List of companies of France
- List of hypermarkets
