= Olaf Koch =

German Manager

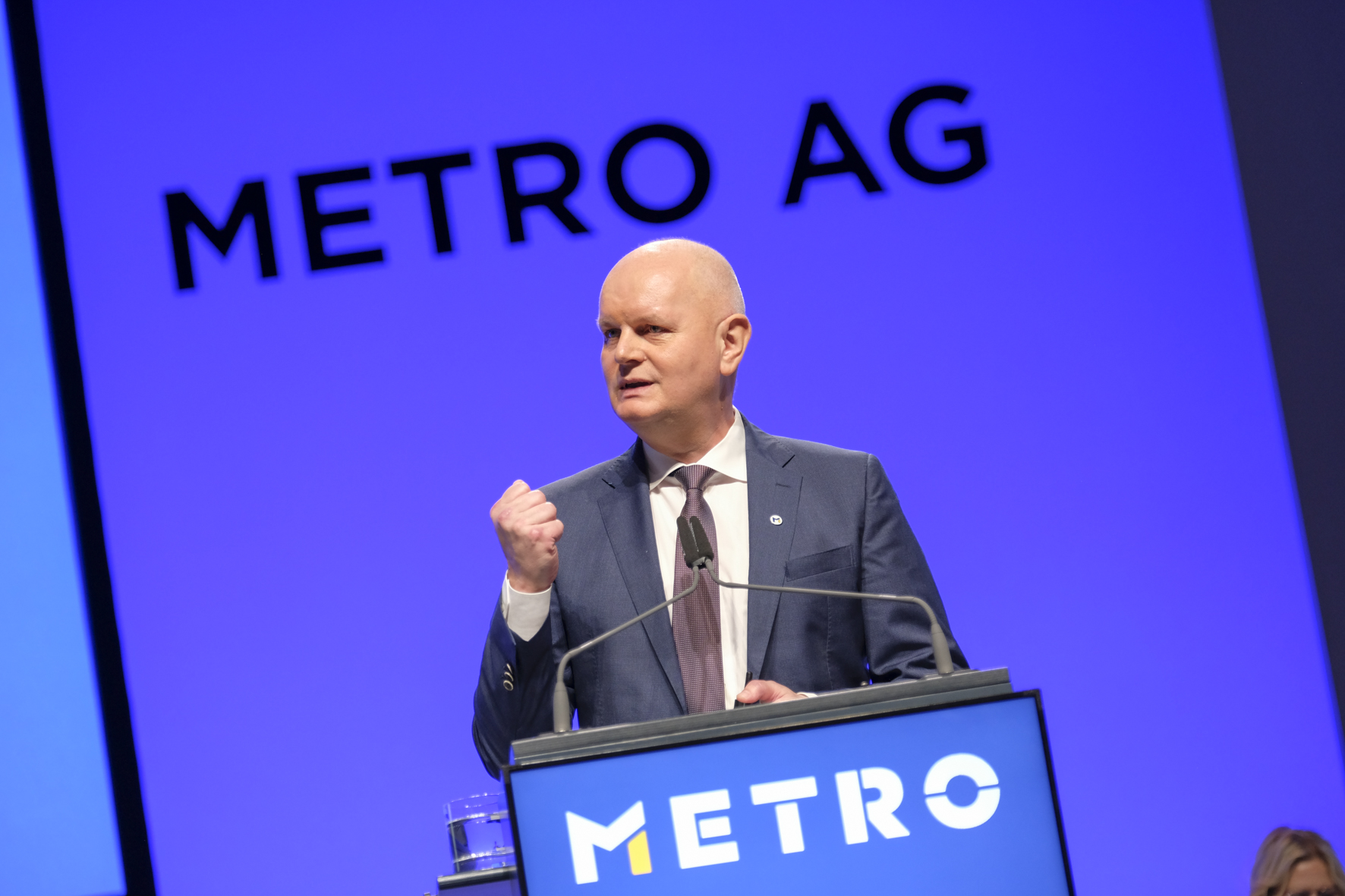
- Koch at the Metro AG annual press conference in Düsseldorf, December 2019
- Born: 1 June 1970 (age 56); Bad Soden am Taunus, Germany
- Education: Baden-Wuerttemberg Cooperative State University Stuttgart
- Occupations: Chief Executive Officer, Metro AG

Olaf Koch (born 1970) is a German business executive. He is a member of the supervisory board of Daimler AG and founder of the venture capital firm Zintinus. From 2012 to 2020 he was CEO of Metro AG.

== Early life and education ==
Olaf Koch was born on 1 June 1970 in Bad Soden am Taunus, close to Frankfurt. His father was in sales at former Hoechst AG and the family moved several times during Koch’s childhood. He therefore also grew up in Barcelona and Stuttgart. After his Abitur in Stuttgart, he studied business administration at the Baden-Wuerttemberg Cooperative State University Stuttgart.

== Initial career ==
Koch began his career in 1994 as manager at Daimler-Benz AG’s department “Finance Process and Systems”. He founded his own IT company in January 1996 and published several books in the field of IT. In 1998, he returned to the Daimler Group (then DaimlerChrysler AG). In 1999, he took over as director of the e-commerce division. He subsequently held various positions within Daimler and became CFO of the Mercedes Car Group in October 2002. In 2007, he went to private equity firm Permira as managing director. As part of his role at Permira, he was a supervisory board member of Hugo Boss.

== Metro ==
Koch came to Metro in September 2009 as CFO. As of 1 January 2012, he took over as CEO of the company. His contract was extended in 2014 and again in 2017. On 21 August 2020 Olaf Koch announced to step down as CEO of Metro AG as of 31 December 2020.

As CEO, Olaf Koch began to transition Metro from a broad-based conglomerate to a pure wholesale company. Among other things, he sold the Galeria Kaufhof department store chain (2015) and separated the group into two companies in 2017, Metro AG (wholesale and Real (hypermarket)), and Ceconomy AG (consumer electronics retail with MediaMarkt and Saturn).

In September 2018, Koch announced plans to sell Real hypermarket. This marked the final stage in the aforementioned dismantling of the conglomerate structure, to form a purely wholesale company. In May 2019, he announced negotiations had begun with redos real estate GmbH for the Real sale. In June 2020, Real was sold to a consortium of X-Bricks and SCP Group.

== Since 2021 ==
In spring 2021, Koch and three partners founded the venture capital firm Zintinus. The investment fund supports start-ups from the food industry with capital but also with networking and expertise. In October 2021, Koch was also elected to the supervisory board of Daimler AG. From February to December 2025, Koch served as chairman of the board of directors of Hubert Burda Media.

== Personal life ==
Olaf Koch is married and has 3 children.
