= Michael Schmidt-Ruthenbeck =

German billionaire businessman

- Born: 1942 (age 83–84)
- Occupations: 16% owner, Metro AG
- Relatives: Rainer Schmidt-Ruthenbeck (brother)

Michael Schmidt-Ruthenbeck (born 1942) is a German billionaire businessman, together with his brother Rainer, owner of 16% of the retail group Metro AG.

== Early life ==
He is the son of Wilhelm Schmidt-Ruthenbeck and Vera Ruthenbeck. His brother is Rainer Schmidt-Ruthenbeck and his sister is Viola Schmidt-Ruthenbeck.

== Career ==
In the 1990s his family founded the Stiftung Mercator, the Mercator Schweiz and the Karl Schmidt Family Foundation.

In February 2006 Michael ousted Reiner from the managing director position at Metro AG. Sometime in 2006 (likely September) the family holding company sold its share of Metro AG from 18.54% to 13.15%.

In August 2007 Otto Beisheim was the victim of a boardroom coup when the Haniel family interest acquired more capital than they had already in Metro AG; together with the Schmidt-Ruthenbeck family holding they held a majority share and Beisheim was frozen out of control.

Schmidt-Ruthenbeck and Metro AG were investigated by the Competition Bureau in 2008 for some reason of concentration (probably some sort of merger with Franz Haniel & Cie.) but the Bureau decided not to proceed.

In September 2011, Haniel owned 34 percent of Metro AG; the Schmidt-Ruthenbeck family owned 16%. CEO Eckhard Cordes feared for his job.

On the Forbes 2016 list of the world's billionaires, he and his brother were ranked #722 with a net worth of US$2.4 billion.

In 2019 it was reported that Cambiata Schweiz was owned by Michael Schmidt-Ruthenbeck and his family.

In 2020 it was revealed that the Schmidt-Ruthenbeck holdings in Metro AG were controlled via the Meridian Foundation mechanism. The family was then engaged is a boardroom tussle with the Czech investor Daniel Kretinsky, who on 21 January controlled 29.99% of the shares. Another significant holding was that of the Beisheim Group.

In October 2022 the Schmidt-Ruthenbeck family was the object of a curiosity seeker. Apparently Michael had invested in a solar PV plant.

== Personal life ==
He lives in Duisburg, Germany.
