= Franz Haniel & Cie. =

Holding company in Germany

Franz Haniel & Cie. GmbH
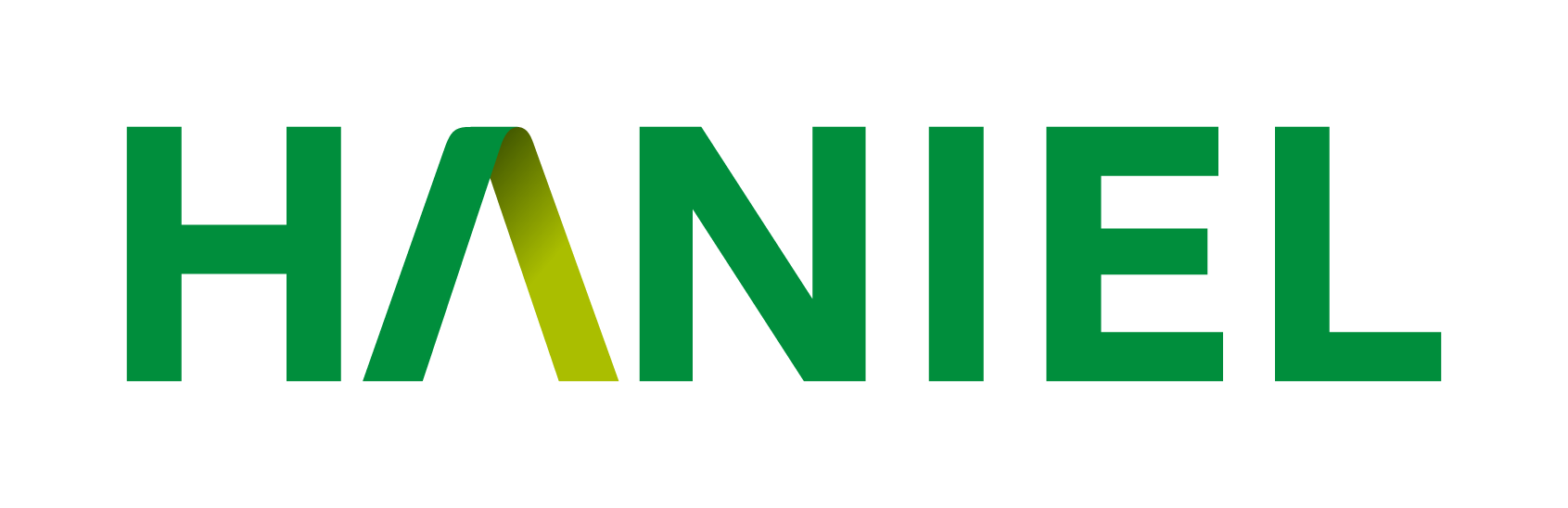
- Type: Private
- Industry: Conglomerate
- Founded: 1756; 270 years ago in Duisburg, Germany
- Founder: Jan Willem Noot
- Key people: Joachim Drees (CEO); Maximilian Schwaiger (chairman)
- Revenue: ▲€4.205 billion (2024)
- Net income: ▲€1 million (2024)
- Total assets: ▼€6.119 million (2024)
- Owner: Haniel family
- Number of employees: ▼21,685 (2024)
- Website: www.haniel.de

Franz Haniel & Cie. GmbH is a German holding company headquartered in Duisburg, Germany. It was founded in 1756 in the city of Ruhrort, now Duisburg. Today, it is one of Europe's largest privately owned family businesses. The Haniel family consists of more than 600 family members and is considered one of the wealthiest families in Germany.

== History ==
=== Foundation ===
The company was founded in Ruhrort by Jan Willem Noot and began as a colonial goods store. Frederick the Great, King of Prussia, signed the leasehold for the land on 10 February 1756. This year is used as the founding year. Jan Willem Noot's daughter Aletta Haniel and her husband, Jacob Haniel, took on the business after his death.

=== 19th century ===
Their youngest son Franz Haniel renamed the company and became the main driving force. With his brother Gerhard Haniel they took over the business at the beginning of the nineteenth century and expanded in many business areas, including merchant shipping, mining and trade.

The marriages of their sisters helped Gerhard Haniel and Franz Haniel to get in contact with their brothers in law Heinrich Huyssen and Gottlob Jacobi. Together the four men founded Hüttengewerkschaft Jacobi, Haniel & Huyssen (JHH) in 1808, which later became the Gutehoffnungshütte stock corporation (GHH).

JHH produced its first complete steam engines in 1820, and set up a shipyard in Ruhrort in 1829. Between 1834 and 1870, the company pioneered modern mining in the Ruhr area.

=== 20th century ===
By 1900 Haniel was active in mining, coal trading, shipping and forwarding. In 1917 Franz Haniel & Co. became Franz Haniel & Cie. GMBH, with the purpose of handling the trading and transport activities of its shareholders as a decentralized holding company. Since 1920 Karl Haniel became company leader. In 1921 Haniel began to trade in artificial fertilizers, and in 1936 it began producing synthetic gasoline made from coal.

Allied bombardments in World War II caused serious losses. Thanks to serious efforts Haniel managed to relaunch shipping and trading as well as the coalmines and steelyards.

In the 1960s Haniel slowly started to divest its heavy industry and gasoline holdings. The family used the money to finance the entry and expansion of new business areas such as pharmaceutical wholesale (Celesio), recycling of industrial waste and the investment in the wholesale and retail chain Metro AG.

In the 1980s the company sold its remaining shares of the Gutehoffnungshütte followed by the withdrawal from the internal trading, fueling and shipping operations.

=== 21st century ===
In September 2011, Haniel owned 34 percent of Metro AG; the Schmidt-Ruthenbeck family owned 16%.

== Investments ==
- BauWatch – 10.00 %
- BekaertDeslee – 100.00 %
- Ceconomy AG – 22.71 %
- CWS group – 100.00 %
- Emma Sleep GmbH – 50.10 %
- KMK Kinderzimmer - majority ownership
- Rovema – 100.00 %
- Takkt – 50.25 %
