= Rainer Schmidt-Ruthenbeck =

German billionaire businessman

- Born: 1941 (age 83–84); Germany
- Occupation: 16% owner of Metro AG
- Relatives: Michael Schmidt-Ruthenbeck (brother)

Rainer Schmidt-Ruthenbeck (also spelled Reiner, born 1941) is a German billionaire businessman and, together with his brother Michael, owner of 16% of the retail group Metro AG.

== Biography ==
He is the son of Wilhelm Schmidt-Ruthenbeck and Vera Ruthenbeck. His brother is Michael Schmidt-Ruthenbeck and his sister is Viola Schmidt-Ruthenbeck.

In the 1990s his family founded the Stiftung Mercator, the Mercator Schweiz and the Karl Schmidt Family Foundation.

On the Forbes 2016 list of the world's billionaires, he and his brother were ranked #722 with a net worth of US$2.4 billion.

He lives in Duisburg, Germany.
