= Kenn, Germany =

Kenn
- Municipality
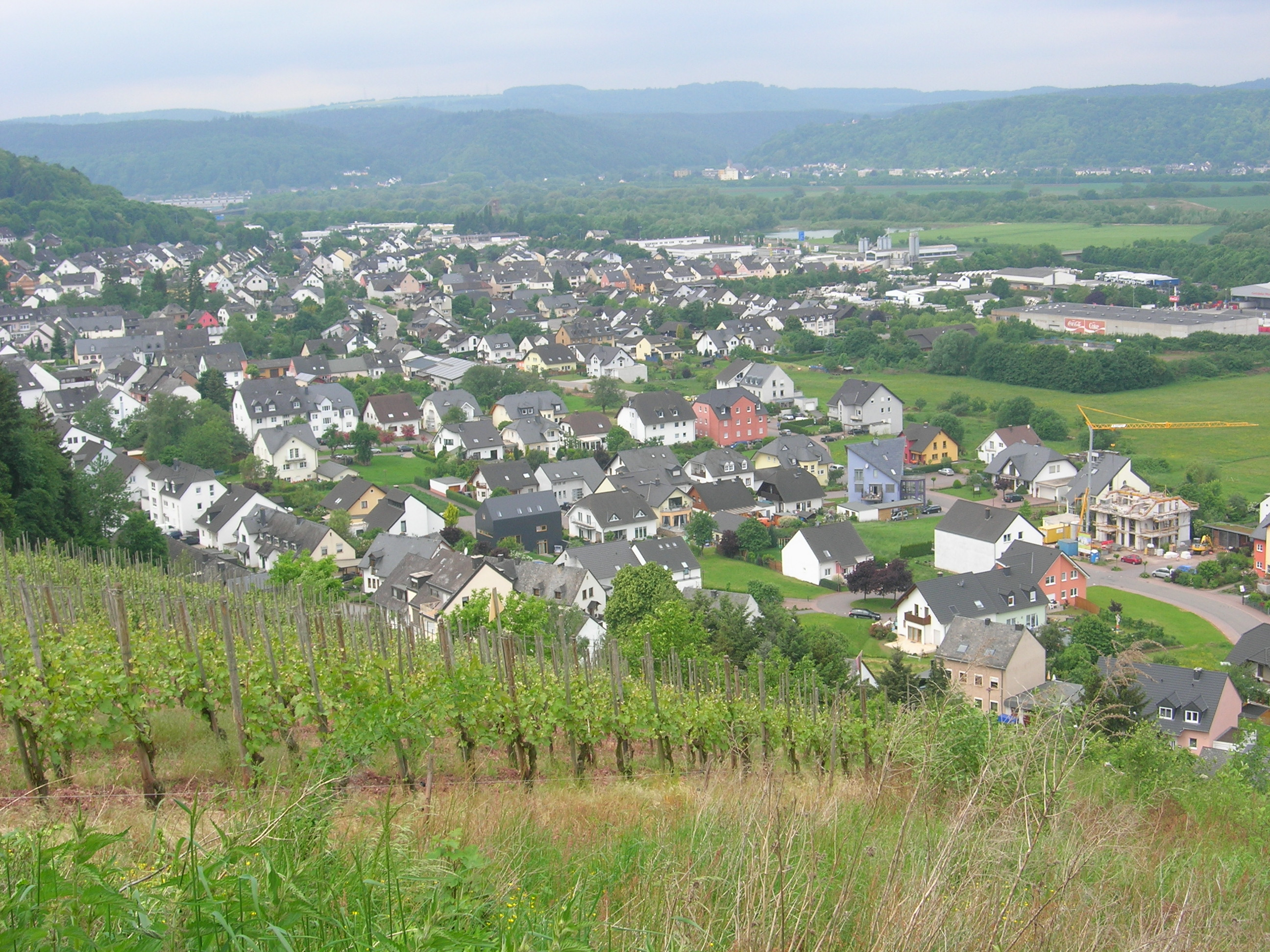
- Panorama of Kenn

- Coat of arms

- Location of Kenn within Trier-Saarburg district
- Interactive map of Kenn
- Location within Germany Location within Rhineland-Palatinate
- Coordinates: 49°48′7″N 6°43′21″E
- Country: Germany
- State: Rhineland-Palatinate
- District: Trier-Saarburg
- Municipal assoc.: Schweich an der Römischen Weinstraße

Government
  - Mayor: Burkhard Apsner (FWG Kenn)

Area
  - Total: 3.91 km^{2} (1.51 sq mi)
- Elevation: 150 m (490 ft)

Population (2025-12-31)
  - Total: 2,924
  - Density: 748/km^{2} (1,940/sq mi)
- Time zone: UTC+01:00 (CET)
  - Summer (DST): UTC+02:00 (CEST)
- Postal codes: 54344
- Dialling codes: 06502
- Vehicle registration: TR, SAB
- Website: kenn.de

Kenn is a municipality situated on the right bank of the Moselle River, immediately adjacent to the city of Trier in the western German state of Rhineland-Palatinate. Located approximately 12.5 kilometers (7.8 miles) east of the Luxembourg border, the village is framed by red sandstone hills and extensive vineyards characteristic of the Middle Moselle segment of the Moselle wine region. Administratively, Kenn is part of the collective municipality of Schweich an der Römischen Weinstraße within the Trier-Saarburg district.

== History ==
Kenn is believed to have been inhabited by the Celts as early as 250 BC. Archaeological discoveries in the vicinity provide evidence of their presence. However, it remains uncertain whether these Celts constituted small transient groups or larger settled tribes. Nevertheless, approximately 2,000 years ago, a Roman settlement emerged on the site that is now Kenn, affirming the existence of a local community with Roman origins.

Findings from both the Iron Age and the Roman Empire era attest to the historical richness of Kenn. One notable artifact is a replica of a statue depicting a Roman Naiad, which can be observed at the Roman Square in Kenn, while the well-preserved original is housed at the Rheinisches Landesmuseum Trier. The town center, which began to flourish in the mid-2nd century, grew around a former Roman manor. During construction work in 1987, three interconnected cellars, occupying an area of approximately 23 m x 4.40 m, were unearthed. Subsequently, the southern room was restored and is now open to visitors. Furthermore, the local museum in Kenn is situated within a farmhouse constructed in 1764, which was built upon the remains of the aforementioned Roman Villa Urbana, the name given to the estate.

Kenn experienced a profound influence during the Maximiner era. While a documented reference from 633 AD was revealed to be a forgery, there is compelling reason to believe that the endowment of extensive territories, including Kenn, to St. Maximin's Abbey can be traced back to the Merovingian king Dagobert I. The first documented mention of Kenn dates back to 893 AD, where the name Cannis is referred to, believed to have derived from Latin and denoting a reed bank. The spelling Kenn has been used since the 18th century onwards.

Eventually, during the War of the First Coalition, the entire left bank of the Rhine, including the local region around Kenn, was conquered and annexed by France under the Treaty of Campo Formio in 1797. As a result of French territorial control, Kenn was placed under the administration of the Mairie of Longuich in the Canton of Schweich in the newly founded Département de la Sarre. The period of secularisation led to the dissolution of the Electorate of Trier and the Benedictine Abbey of St. Maximin in 1803. After Napoleon was defeated in 1815, Kenn was proclaimed part of the Regierungsbezirk Trier in the Kingdom of Prussia.

=== Population development ===
Year	Inhabitants
1815	409
1835	737
1871	808
1905	713
1939	872
1950	960
1961	1,114
1970	1,324
1987	2,276
1990	2,321
2000	2,493
2010	2,561
2020	2,821
2021	2,859
2025	3,046

== Politics ==
=== Municipal council ===
The municipal council of Kenn is composed of 20 councillors, who were elected in the local elections on 9 June 2024 through a system of personalized proportional representation, and the honorary local mayor who serves as the chairperson. The allocation of seats within the municipal council is as follows:

Election	SPD	CDU	FWG	Total
2024	3	5	12	20 seats
2019	4	8	8	20 seats
2014	4	9	7	20 seats
2009	4	9	7	20 seats
2004	5	10	5	20 seats
1999	7	7	6	20 seats

(FWG = Freie Wählergruppe Kenn 1979 e.V., a local political group unaffiliated with any national party)

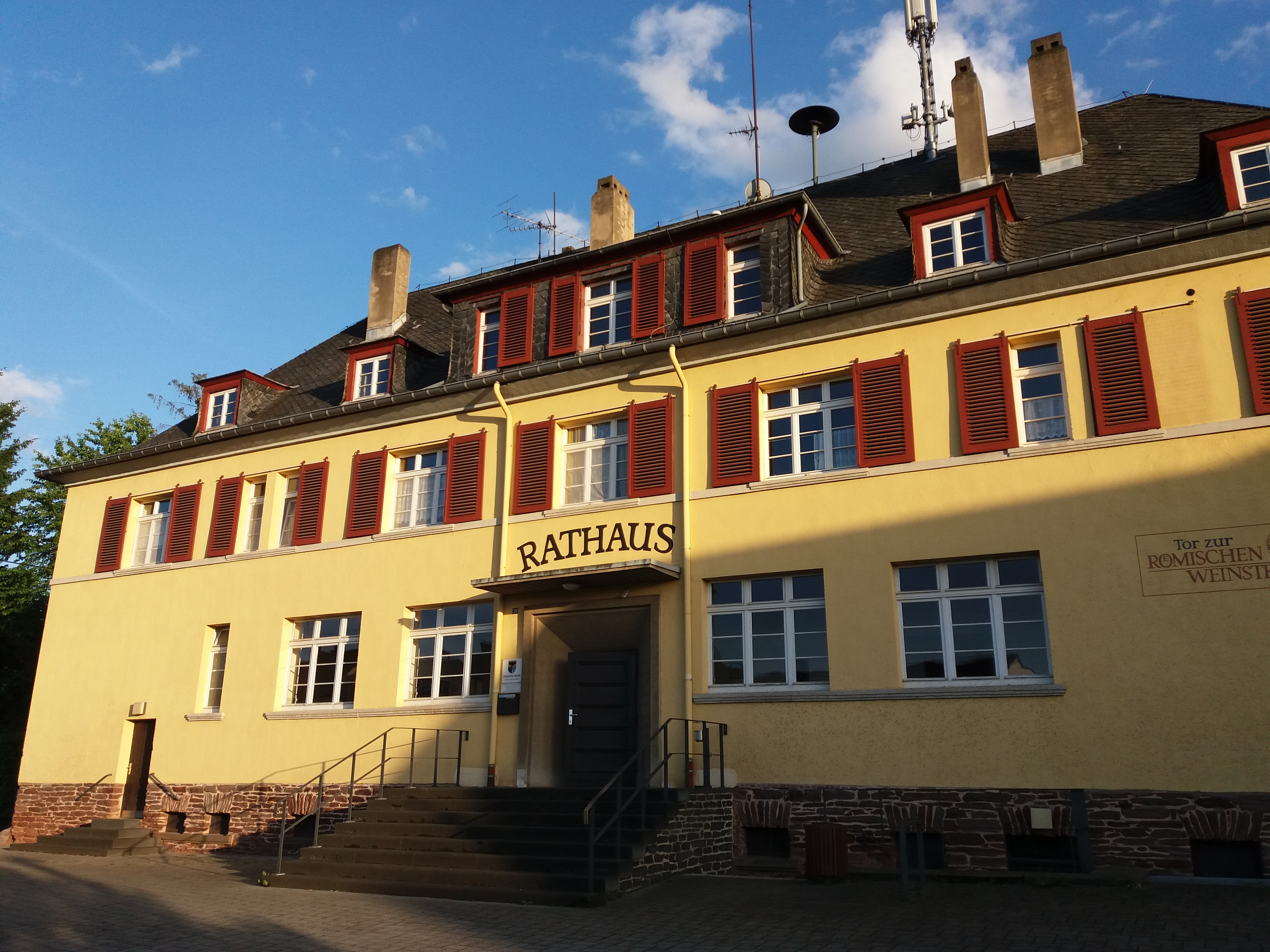
Town hall of Kenn

=== Mayor ===
Burkhard Apsner (FWG) has been the local mayor of Kenn since 2023. His predecessor was Rainer Müller (CDU) who had held the office since 2009. Müller's predecessor Manfred Nink (SPD) held the office from 1996 to 2009. Due to personal reasons, Müller stepped down from politics at the start of 2023, leading to the scheduling of early elections on 25 June 2023. Burkhard Apsner was elected mayor of Kenn with a vote share of 95.5% and reconfirmed in the local elections of 9 June 2024, with a vote share of 88.3%.

== Landmarks ==
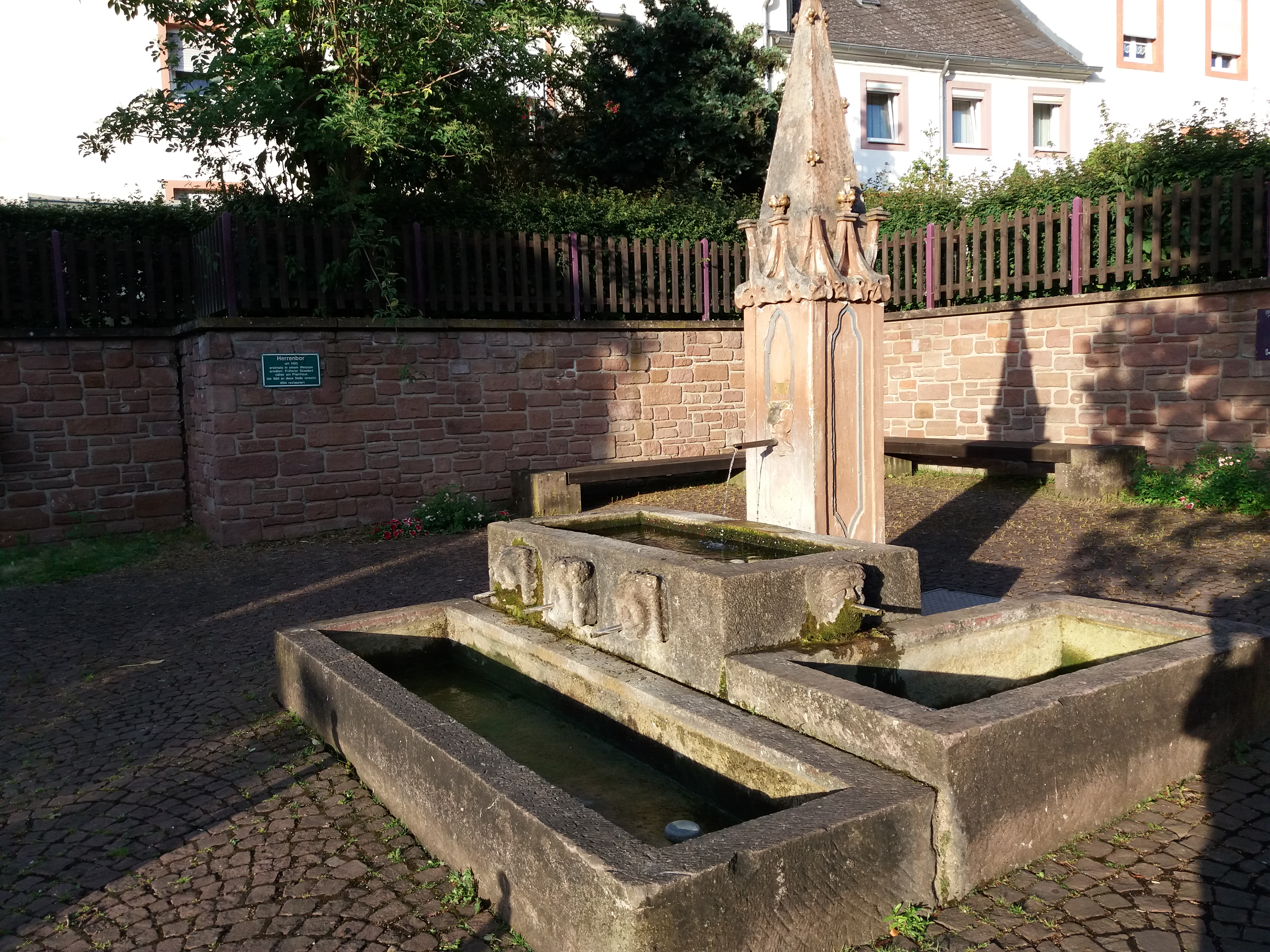
Herrenbor

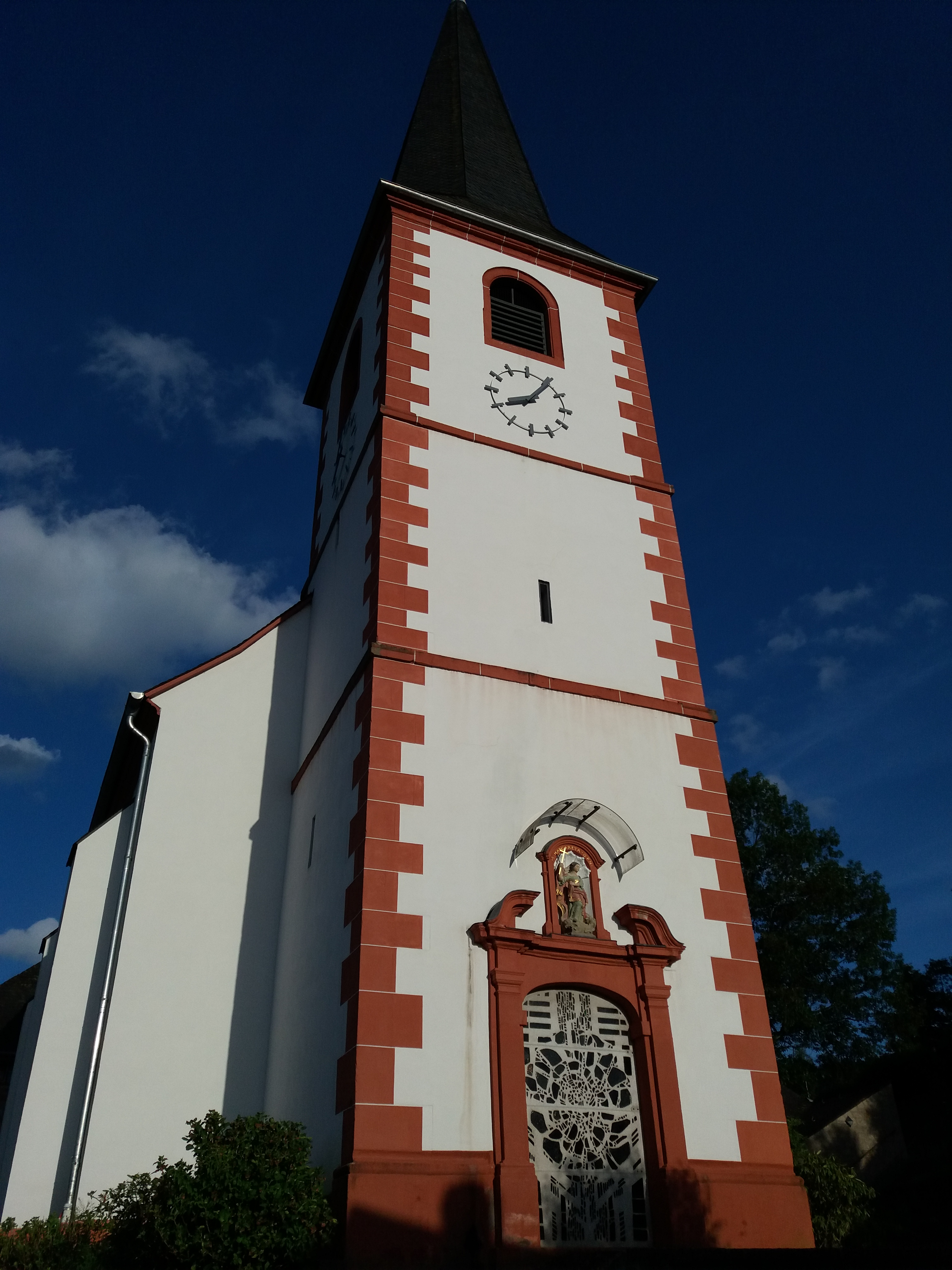
Parish church of Saint Margaret

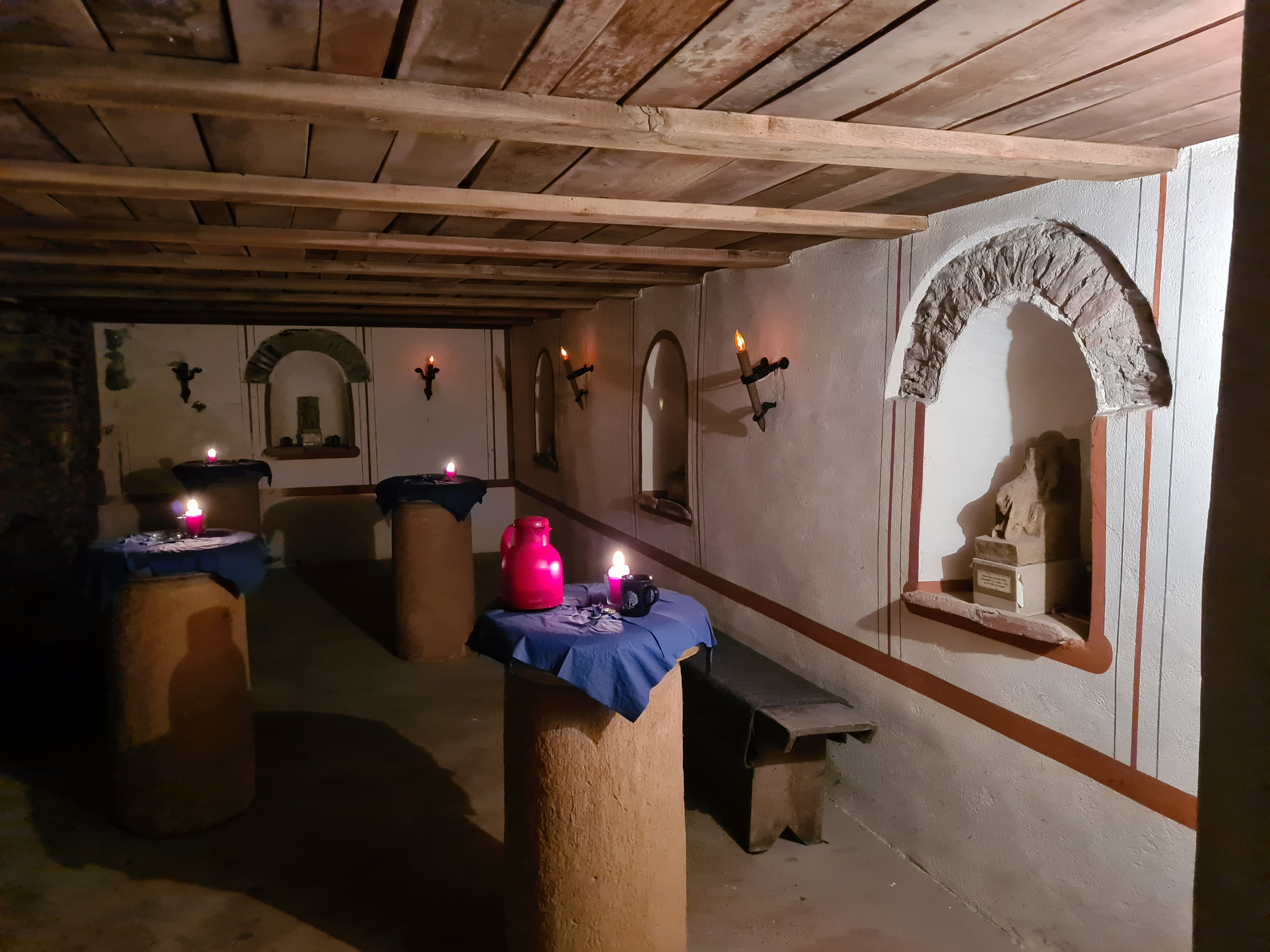
Römerkeller

Due to its location on the banks of the Moselle amidst a landscape of vineyards, Kenn is also known as the Gateway to the Roman Wine Route, a tourist area that follows the ancient Roman supply roads that ran parallel to the river. As a result, Kenn is home to several landmarks, including:

- Römerkeller, the restored wine cellars of an ancient Roman Villa Urbana
- Römerplatz, the ancient Roman town square, housing the replica of a Roman Naiad statue
- Herrenbor, the oldest preserved village well in the district, built around 1500 with Gothic features
- Maximiner Hof, a former estate of St. Maximin's Abbey, dated 1739
- Heimatmuseum, a baroque farmstead from 1746, housing the local history museum with over 800 exhibits about the life of the rural population in the 19th and 20th century
- Pfarrkirche St. Margareta, Parish church on the site of an ancient chapel from 700 AD, remodeled and enlarged in the 17th, 18th and 20th centuries, dedicated to Margaret of Antioch
- Kenner Flur, a designated nature reserve on the banks of the Moselle with an old water works from 1903, serving as a nursery for bird species such as the great crested grebe, sand martin and little ringed plover, and as a rest area during bird migration
- Kenner Ley, a steep bank section in the west of the village with residential buildings around 60 meters above the picturesque Moselle Valley

== Infrastructure ==
=== Leisure ===
In Kenn, there is the Bernhard Becker leisure facility, which features a playground equipped with slides and swings, and a football and basketball court, along with a designated area for skateboarding and roller skating. Additionally, the municipality boasts a multi-purpose hall, used for sports activities and events. Moreover, there is a tennis center that houses an indoor soccer field and an augmented reality go-kart track. On the outskirts of the town, adjacent to the forest, one can find an outdoor soccer field complete with a running track and a beach volleyball field. Furthermore, Kenn offers a water treading facility, a barbecue area, and a boules pitch.

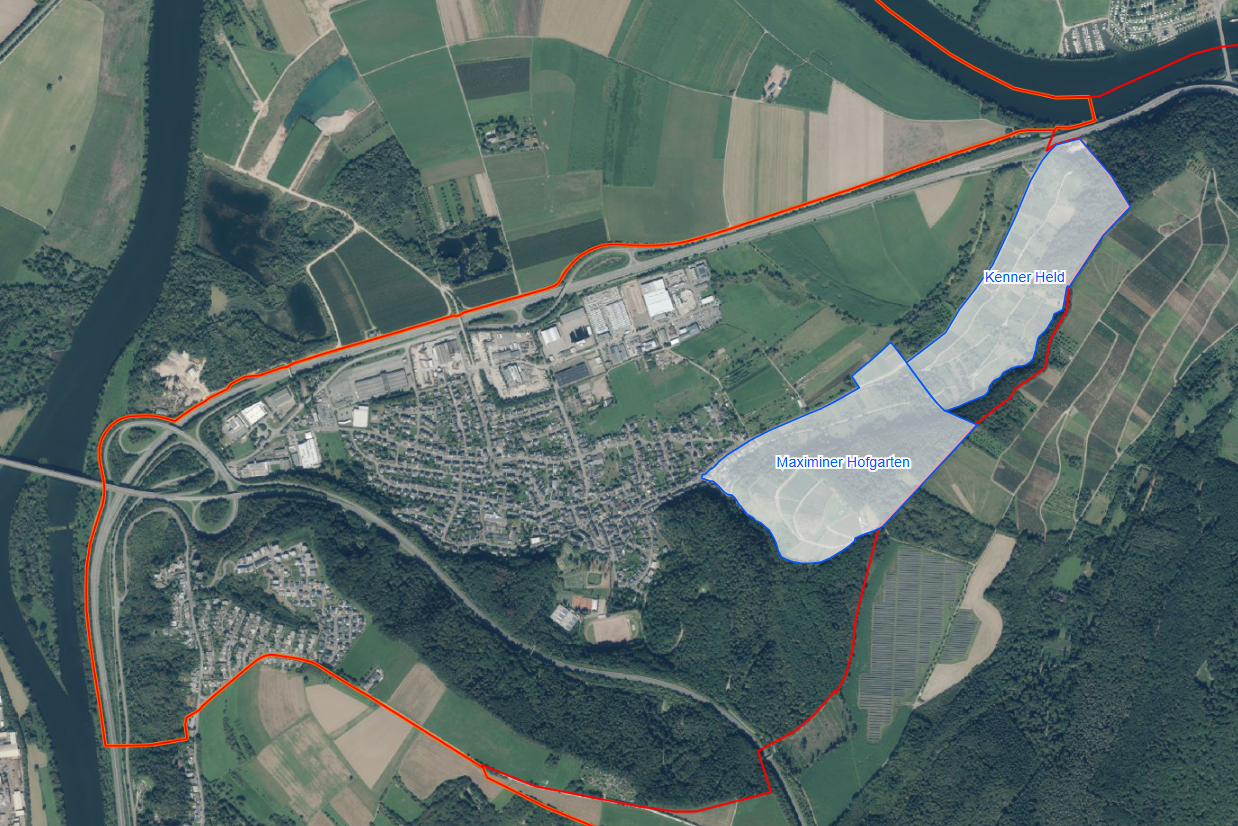
Location of Maximiner Hofgarten and Kenner Held, the two vineyards situated in Kenn.

=== Economy ===
Due to the strategically beneficial location between Trier, Luxembourg, Cologne, Koblenz, Saarbrücken and Metz, numerous companies have settled in the local industrial park. Furthermore, there is a kindergarten, a primary school and a branch office of a savings bank. There is also a pharmacy, an internist, a veterinarian and a dentist. Two vineyards are situated in Kenn, named Maximiner Hofgarten and Kenner Held, respectively.

Kenn is known for the Moselle Shopping Centre, that opened in 1969 and is located near to both the Landesstraße 145 and the Bundesautobahn 602. It was previously operated by Schmidt & Breug (1969-1986), Plaza (1986-1990), Continent (1990-1996), Interspar (1996-1999), Walmart (1999-2007) and Real (2007-2021). The mall was closed until further notice at the end of September 2021. After several years of vacancy, it was publicly announced in 2024 that the Aldi Group had purchased the site and would revitalize it, naming anchor tenants Aldi Süd, REWE, and dm.

=== Transport ===
Kenn is located on the route of the former Moselle Railway. Today, public transport is primarily operated by Moselbahn buses in the fare zone of the Trier Region Transport Association (VRT). Also, the Moselle Cycle Path and several hiking paths run through the village.

Kenn is situated at the intersection of the following motorways:

- A 1 Saarbrücken - Wittlich - Euskirchen - Cologne
- A 64 Luxembourg (there it is called Autoroute 1) - Kenn
- A 602, which connects Kenn to the A 1

The following federal highways are connected to Kenn:

- B 52 near Trier-Ehrang
- B 53 Trier – Schweich – Mehring – Bernkastel-Kues – Zell – Alf via the A 602

In the west of the municipality, there is a bridge crossing the Moselle between Trier-Ehrang and Kenn. It connects the A 64, A 602, B 52 and B 53 with Kenn. The bridge has a footpath and cycle path leading directly to the port of Trier and the centre of Ehrang.

Luxembourg Airport is approximately 20.5 nautical miles (38 km; 23.6 mi) to the southwest of Kenn.
