= Kenner Flur =

Nature reserve in Trier, Germany

Coordinates: 49°48′26″N 6°42′42″E

The Kenner Flur in the northwest of Kenn is a nature reserve in Trier, Rhineland-Palatinate, which was formed on July 7, 1989 by ordinance of the Trier district authority . The size is 31.4 hectares, includes parts of the Ruwer-Paulin district and is located on the Moselle. Protection goals are the preservation of the bank and water structures typical of the Moselle floodplain, including the associated plant communities as a habitat for endangered insects and amphibians. The area also serves as a nursery for bird species such as the great crested grebe, sand martin and little ringed plover and as a resting place during bird migration. The Kennerbach flows into the Moselle at the eastern end of the Kenner Flur.

== Naming ==
The Kenner Flur was formerly part of the municipality of Kenn. In 1969, the Kenner Flur was incorporated into the city of Trier.

== Pictures ==
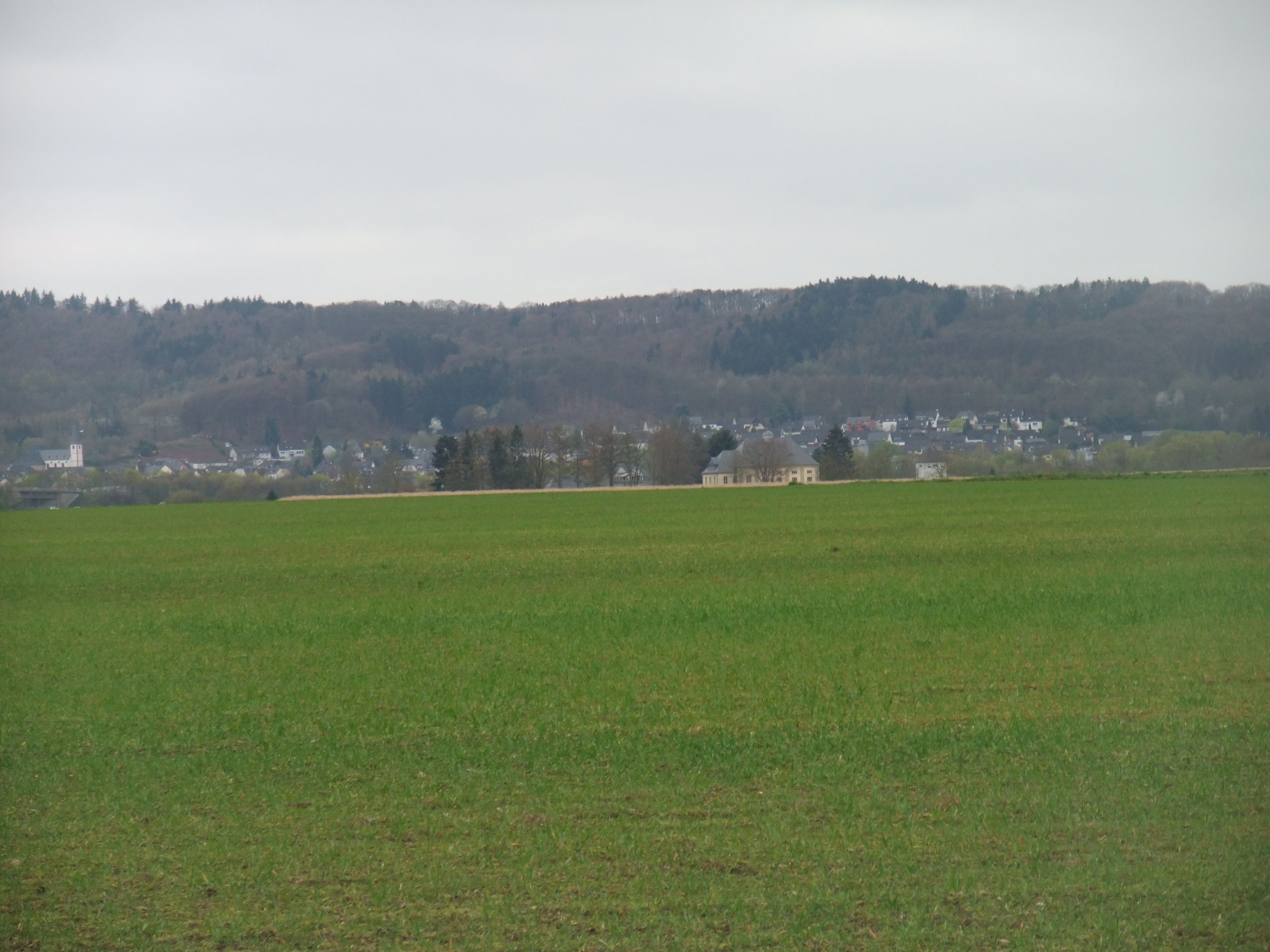
Kenner Flur with the Trier waterworks and Kenn in the background

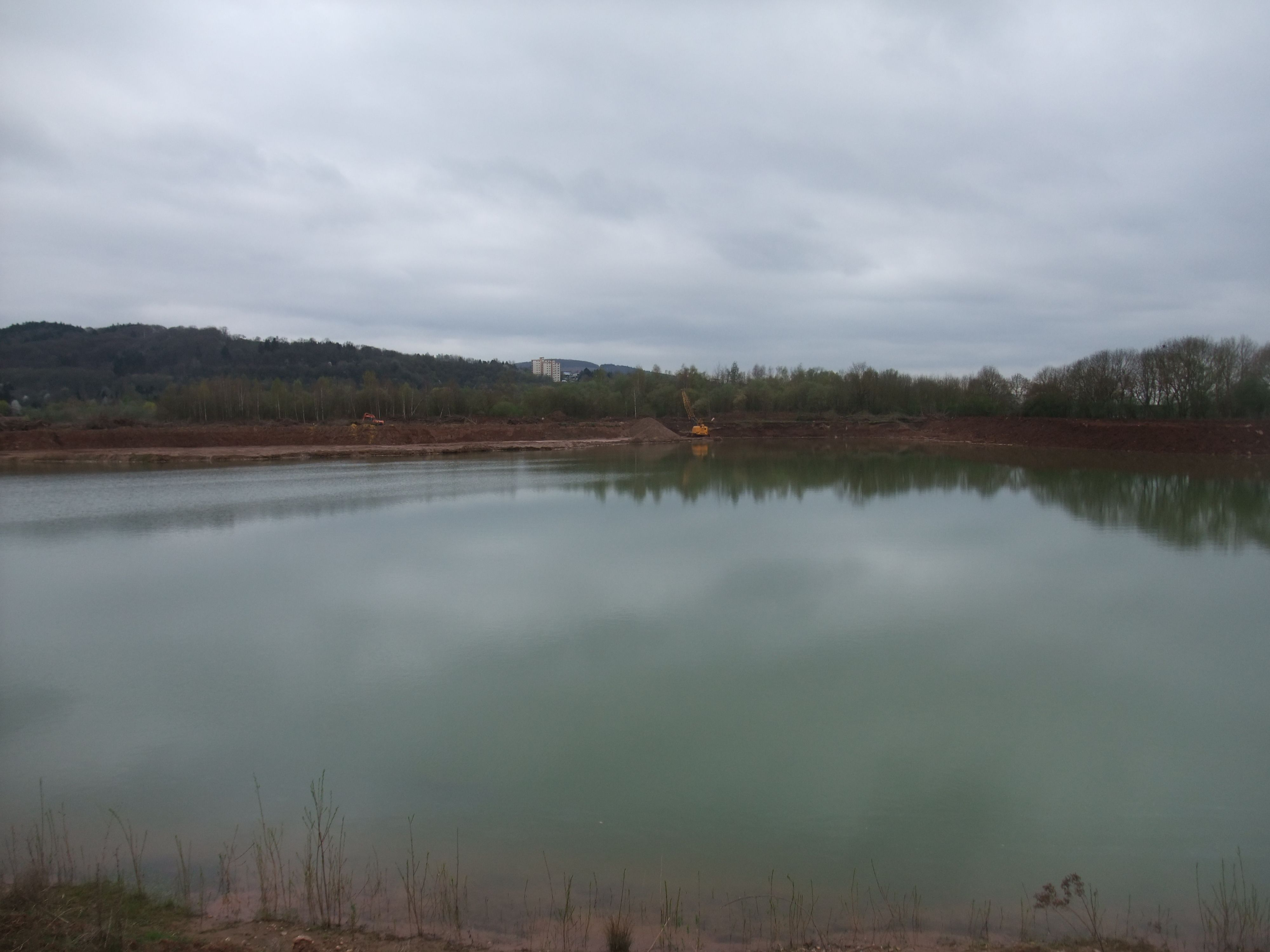
Gravel pit and the Kenner Ley in the background

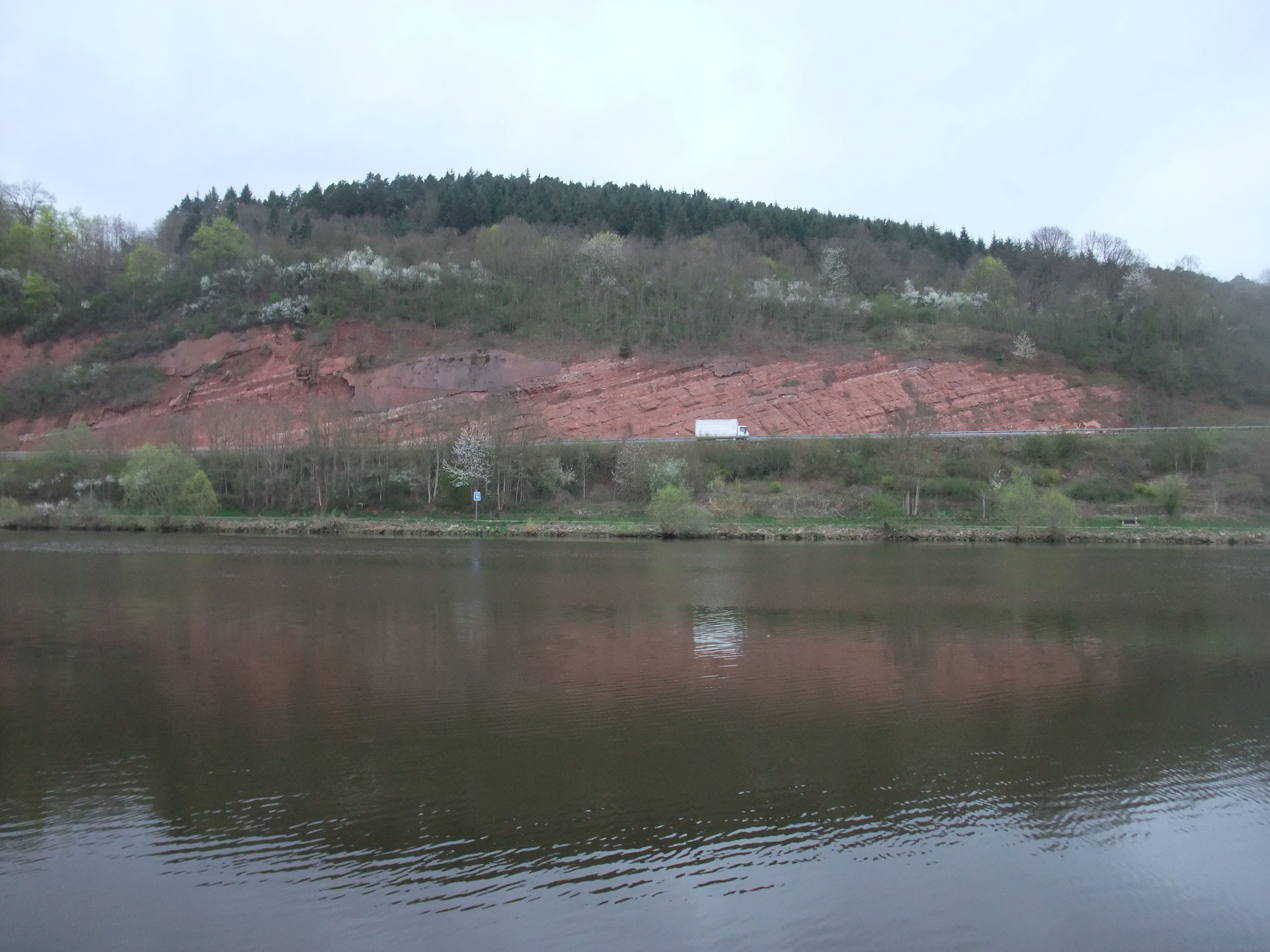
View of the Rothenberg

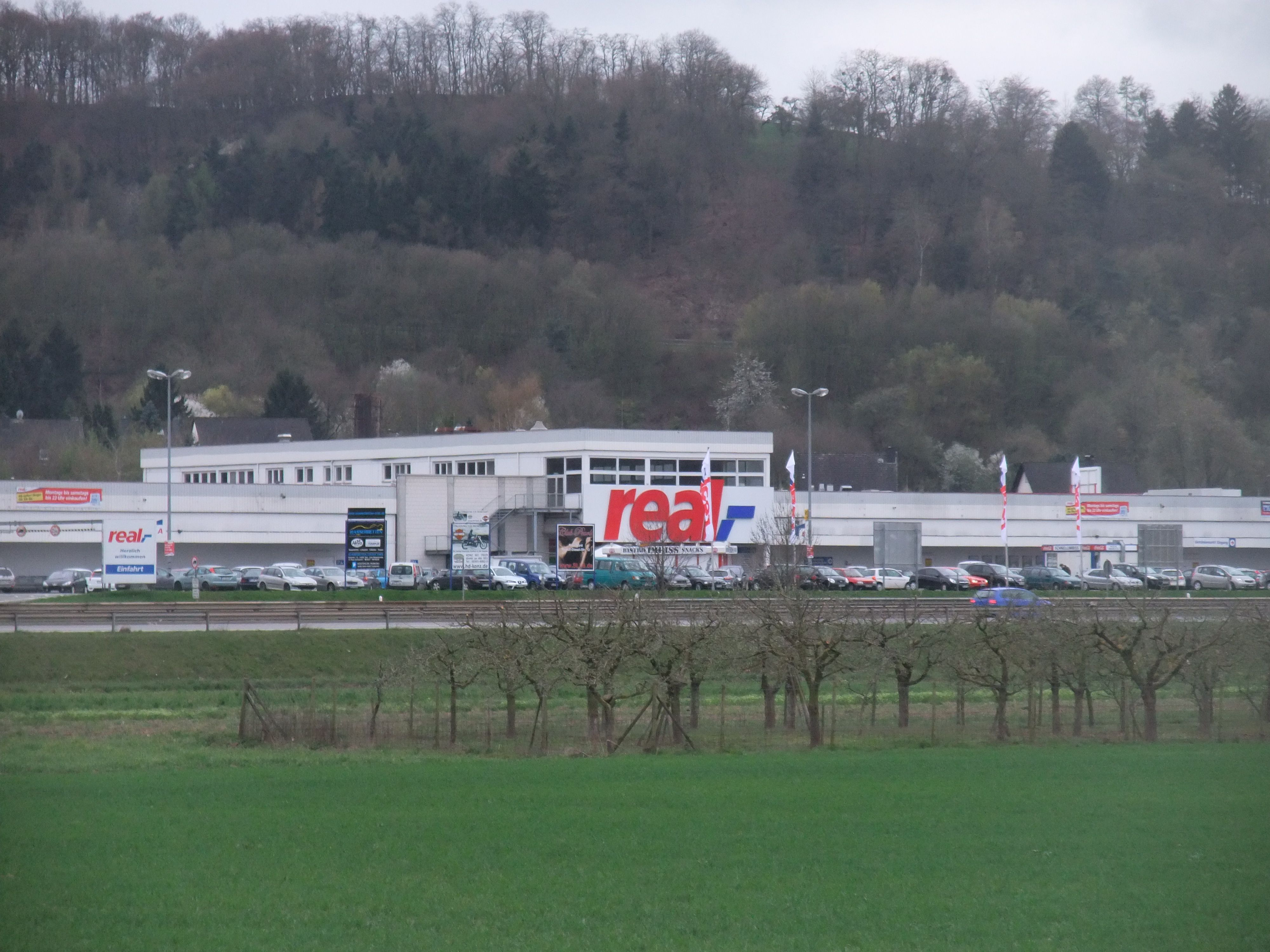
Moseleinkaufszentrum Kenn (2011)
