= BekaertDeslee =

BekaertDeslee is a textile company specialized in the production of knitted and woven mattress fabrics and mattress covers. The headquarters is located in Waregem, Belgium and is the largest mattress fabric company. The company was founded in 1892 as Bekaert Textiles by Ivo Bekaert. In 2015, the company became part of Franz Haniel & Cie., a German family equity company. In 2016, Bekaert Textiles acquired DesleeClama and became BekaertDeslee.

== History ==
Year	Event
1892	Foundation of Bekaert Textiles in Vichte, Belgium, by Ivo Bekaert.
1928	Foundation Deslee Textiles in Vichte, Belgium, by Maurice Deslee.
1955	Bekaert Australia started.
1970	Bekaert Textiles Acquired by W. R. Grace and Company.
1992	Bekaert Textiles becomes part of Gamma Holding.
1998	PT Clama Indonesia is founded; Bekaert Textiles USA founded.
2000	Schoedel acquired by Bekaert.
2002	Deslee USA founded.
2003	Bekaert Textiles starts in Wuxi, China; Bekaert acquires Textiles & Diseños in Argentina.
2004	Deslee acquires Clama and becomes DesleeClama
2005	Bekaert Textiles acquires Telartex in Mexico.
2006	DesleeClama opens factories in Brazil and Romania.
2007	Bekaert Textiles Turkey is opened.
2010	DesleeClama acquires a 40% stake in Mattex South Africa; Gamma Holding deslisted and acquired by private equity partners Gilde & Parcom.
2011	DesleeClama opens DC Solutions (zippered covers) in Romania, a factory in Dongguan China, and a factory in Estonia.
2012	Embasa Laval taken over by Bekaert Textiles and acquisition of PPI (zippered covers)
2015	Bekaert Textiles becomes part of Haniel; DesleeClama Poland is opened
2016	Bekaert Textiles acquires DesleeClama and becomes BekaertDeslee.
