= Haniel family =

German family

Haniel
- Business family
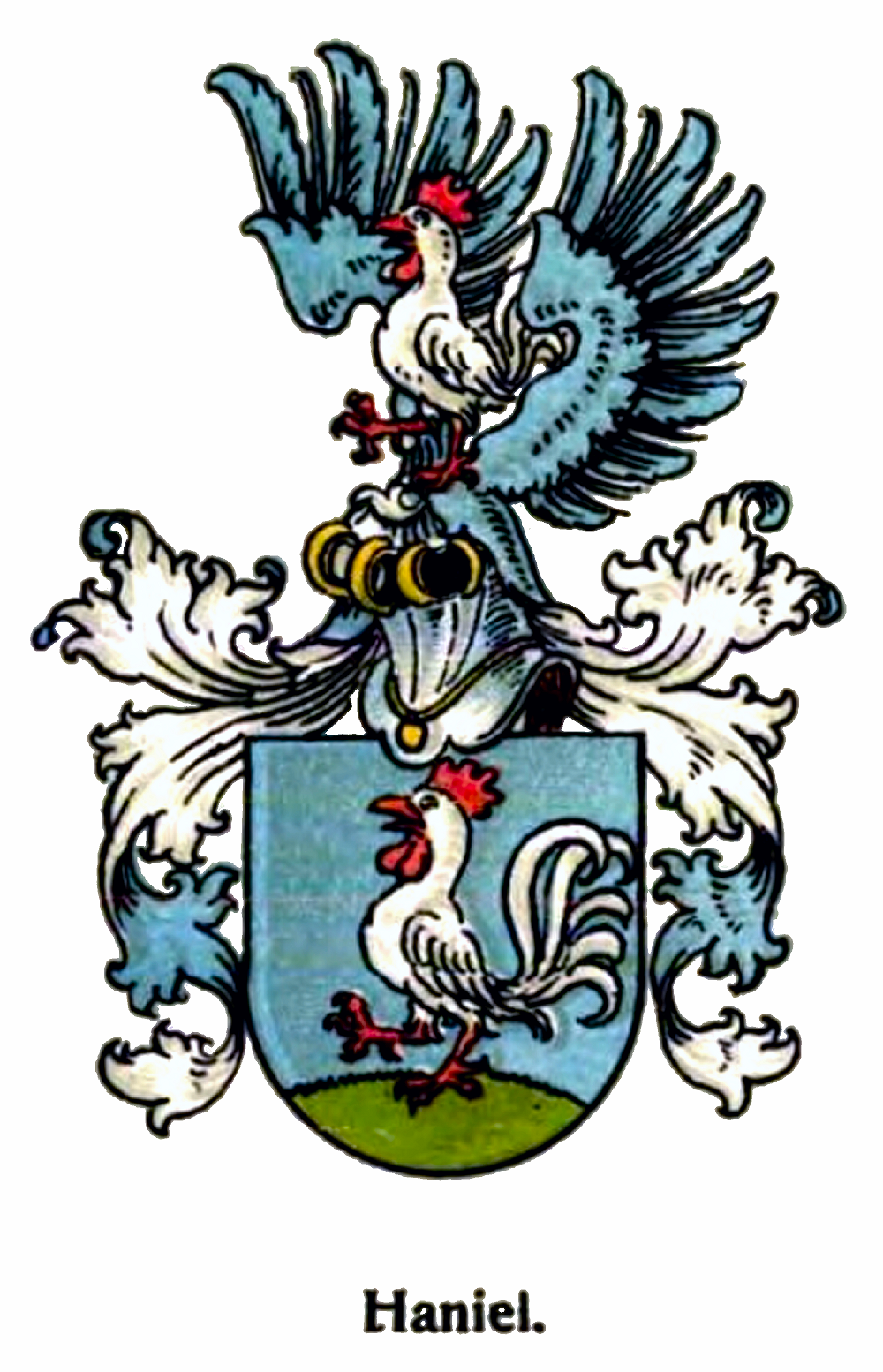
- Place of origin: Duisburg, Palatinate
- Founded: Start of business activities 1756, Duisburg; 269 years ago

The Haniel family (German pronunciation: [ˈhaːniˌɛl]) is a German entrepreneurial dynasty originating in Duisburg, Rhineland who is primarily known for their multigenerational Franz Haniel & Cie. concern which was founded in 1756. They belong among the richest German families.

The family business Franz Haniel & Cie is owned by roughly 680 family shareholders. The concern owns participations of 800-900 companies with an annual turnover of EUR 3,9 billion (2014) and 11,544 employees worldwide (2014). Chairman of the Supervisory board is Franz Markus Haniel. He is also an honorary member of the Haniel foundation (German: Haniel-Stiftung).
