= Karl Haniel =

German entrepreneur

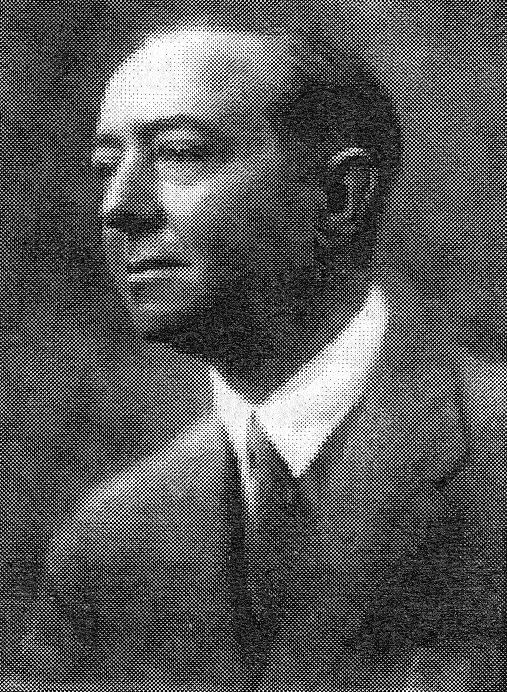
Karl Haniel

Karl Haniel (12 February 1877 in Koblenz – 30 October 1944 in Dabringhausen) was a German civil servant and entrepreneur.

== Early career ==
Karl Haniel was the son of District Administrators Paul Haniel and Ida Nobiling. He studied law in Bonn, where he became a member of the Corps Guestphalia Bonn, and entered the Prussian judicial service in 1901 as a court trainee. A year later he received a doctorate.

From 1903 he worked as a government trainee in Düsseldorf. In 1907 he was appointed government assessor. In 1909 Haniel was employed in the Interior's Reich Office. Between 1912 and 1915, Haniel served as district administrator of the Merzig district in the then Prussian part of what was later to become Saarland.

From 1915 to 1917, Haniel worked in the civil administration of Hainaut (in occupied Belgium). In 1917 he became head of administration for the province of Wallonia.

Since 1920 Haniel became company leader of German company Franz Haniel & Cie.

== Literature ==
- Haniel, Karl. In: Robert Volz: Reich manual of the German society . The handbook of personalities in words and pictures. Volume 1: A-K. Deutscher Wirtschaftsverlag, Berlin 1930, DNB 453960286, p. 652.
