= Takkt =

TAKKT AG
- Type: Public
- ISIN: DE0007446007
- Founded: 1945; 81 years ago in Stuttgart, Germany
- Revenue: €1,337 million (2022)
- Number of employees: 2,437 (2022)
- Website: www.takkt.de

Takkt AG is a listed business-to-business company for business equipment, based in Stuttgart, Germany. The holding Franz Haniel & Cie. is the largest shareholder with a stake of 65.0% (as of December 31, 2022). In 2022, the company generated revenue of 1,337 million euros with 2,437 employees.

The companies and brands of the Takkt Group focus primarily on the sale of durable and price-stable equipment and specialty items for recurring needs of corporate customers in various industries and regions. The product ranges offered largely comprise consumer goods that companies use in the course of their business activities.

== History ==
The company has its roots in Kaiser+Kraft GmbH, which was founded in Stuttgart in 1945 by Helmut Kraft and Walter Kaiser and specialized in the shipping of industrial consumer goods. Following rapid expansion in the 1950s, the company also began to operate in other European countries in the 1960s. In 1985, Kaiser+Kraft was taken over by Gehe AG, also based in Stuttgart, and integrated into the mail order division, which from then on was managed under Kaiser+Kraft. In addition to the further development of the European markets, expansion now also focused on the North American market. Through acquisitions and newly founded companies, the Gehe Group division became the market leader in specialty mail order for office and consumer goods. In 1999, the Kaiser+Kraft division was spun off and renamed Takkt as part of Gehe's reorientation towards pharmaceutical wholesaling. In the spin-off, each holder of a Gehe share received one share in the new company. Takkt has been listed on the Frankfurt Stock Exchange and the Stuttgart Stock Exchange since September 15, 1999.

== Services ==
The Group is represented in more than 25 countries and consists of three divisions: Industrial & Packaging, Office Furniture & Displays and FoodService. The Industrial & Packaging division focuses on Europe, while the other two divisions are based in North America.
