= Bi1 =

Hypermarket chain in Poland and France

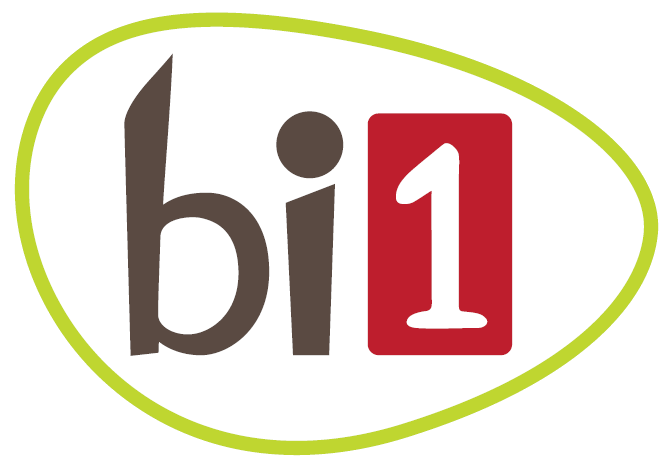
- Logo of Bi1 as of 2021.
- Industry: Hypermarket chain
- Founded: 3 March 2021; 5 years ago
- Number of locations: 8 (2024)
- Area served: France; Poland; Tajikistan; Uzbekistan
- Website: bi1.pl

Bi1 is a hypermarket chain in Poland, Tajikistan and Uzbekistan and supermarket chain in France. In Poland, currently eight large-format stores operate under this banner, including seven locations acquired from Real and a hypermarket in Ełk, established specifically for the chain and opened on 3 March 2021. These stores are managed by Rella Investments.

Additionally, the Schiever Group owns two centers in Poland featuring Auchan hypermarkets (located in Racibórz and Zielona Góra), which are overseen by Schiever Polska.

The Bi1 brand also exists in its native French market, where it encompasses a chain of supermarkets with smaller retail spaces. On 2 May 2018, Schiever Group opened its first Bi1 store in Tajikistan. The brand is also present in Uzbekistan.

== Poland ==
In Poland, Bi1 was created due to the acquisition of Real by Auchan.
