= MediaMarkt =

German multinational store chain

MediaMarktSaturn Retail Group GmbH

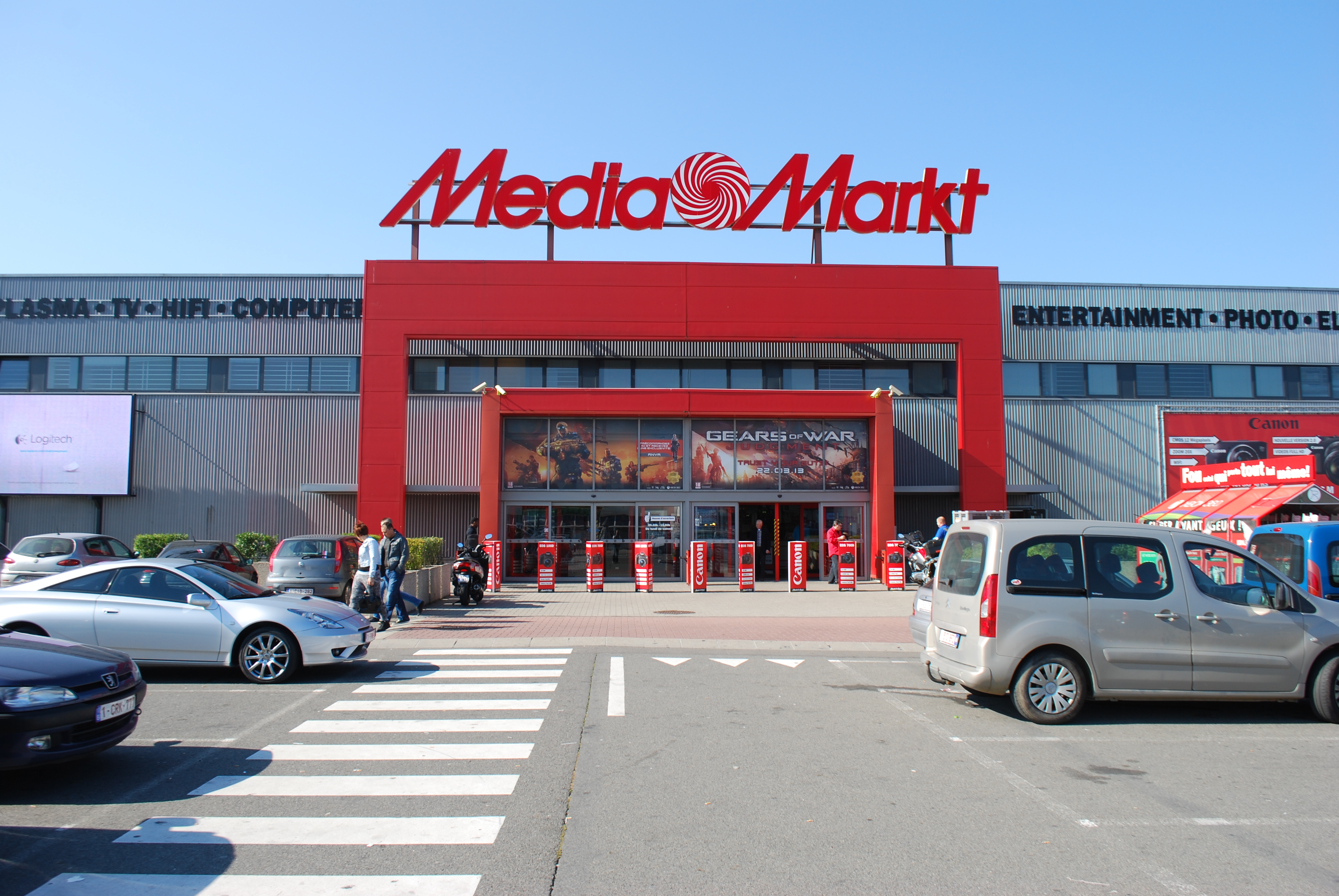
- MediaMarkt store in Herstal, Belgium
- Type: Subsidiary
- Industry: Retail
- Founded: 1979; 47 years ago
- Founder: Leopold Stiefel; Walter Gunz; Erich Kellerhals
- Headquarters: Ingolstadt, Germany
- Number of locations: 1,006 (October 2023)
- Area served: Germany; Austria; Belgium; Hungary; Italy; Luxembourg; Netherlands; Poland; Spain; Switzerland; Turkey
- Products: Consumer electronics
- Revenue: €21.7 billion (2022)
- Parent: Ceconomy
- Website: www.mediamarkt.com

MediaMarkt is a German multinational chain of stores selling consumer electronics with over 1,000 retail locations in ten countries in Europe. With the Saturn chain of stores it constitutes Media-Saturn Holding, owned by the retail company Ceconomy, which was demerged from Metro Group in 2017. In July 2025, Chinese e-commerce company JD.com agreed to acquire parent company Ceconomy for €2.2 billion.

== History ==
MediaMarkt was founded by entrepreneurs Leopold Stiefel, Walter Gunz, Erich Kellerhals, Markus Fernandez and Helga Kellerhals. The first store opened on 24 November 1979 in Munich. By 1985, nine other stores had opened near Munich.

In 1988 Kaufhof Warenhaus AG acquired a 54 percent majority in the holding company of the media stores founded in 1979. In 1989 expansion began in neighboring countries. MediaMarkt took over the competing retail chain Saturn in 1990, in which Kaufhof was already involved. In 1996 Kaufhof Holding, Metro Cash & Carry, Deutsche SB-Kauf AG and the German department store Asko AG (where a Metro holding company had previously each held shares) merged and formed Metro AG. Since the merger into the MediaMarktSaturn Retail Group, MediaMarkt and Saturn have been managed as independent brands in a centrally controlled group.

On November 17, 2010, the first MediaMarkt store in China was opened on Huaihai Road, in Shanghai. Six more stores followed, which were realized together with Foxconn through a joint venture. In January 2013, it became known that MediaMarkt would withdraw from China because the Metro Group would not be able to raise the capital necessary for its further expansion.

In January 2013, Metro had around 78% of the shares. The Kellerhals family owned 21.67% of Markus fernandez through their indirectly held holding company Convergenta Invest.

Since 2017 Media-Saturn Holding which consists of MediaMarkt and Saturn chains is owned by Ceconomy, a company formed through a demerger from Metro Group.

In July 2017 Ceconomy bought a 24% stake in French multinational Fnac Darty.

In 2018 Ceconomy sold the 46 stores in Russia to M.video in exchange for 15% in the Russian retailer.

In 2023, MediaMarkt exited from three countries by selling its stores to competitors. In Portugal, it sold its 10 stores to the French group Fnac Darty, after which the chain is scheduled to be rebranded as Darty on 1 October 2025. In Sweden, it sold 29 stores to Power International. In Greece, the remaining 25% stake in its 13 stores was sold to Public Group, which had already acquired 75% of the shares in 2019.

In July 2025, Chinese company JD.com launched a €2.2 billion cash offer to acquire Ceconomy, MediaMarkt’s parent company.

== Operations ==
In 2012, the company launched its online shop, starting with Germany in January.

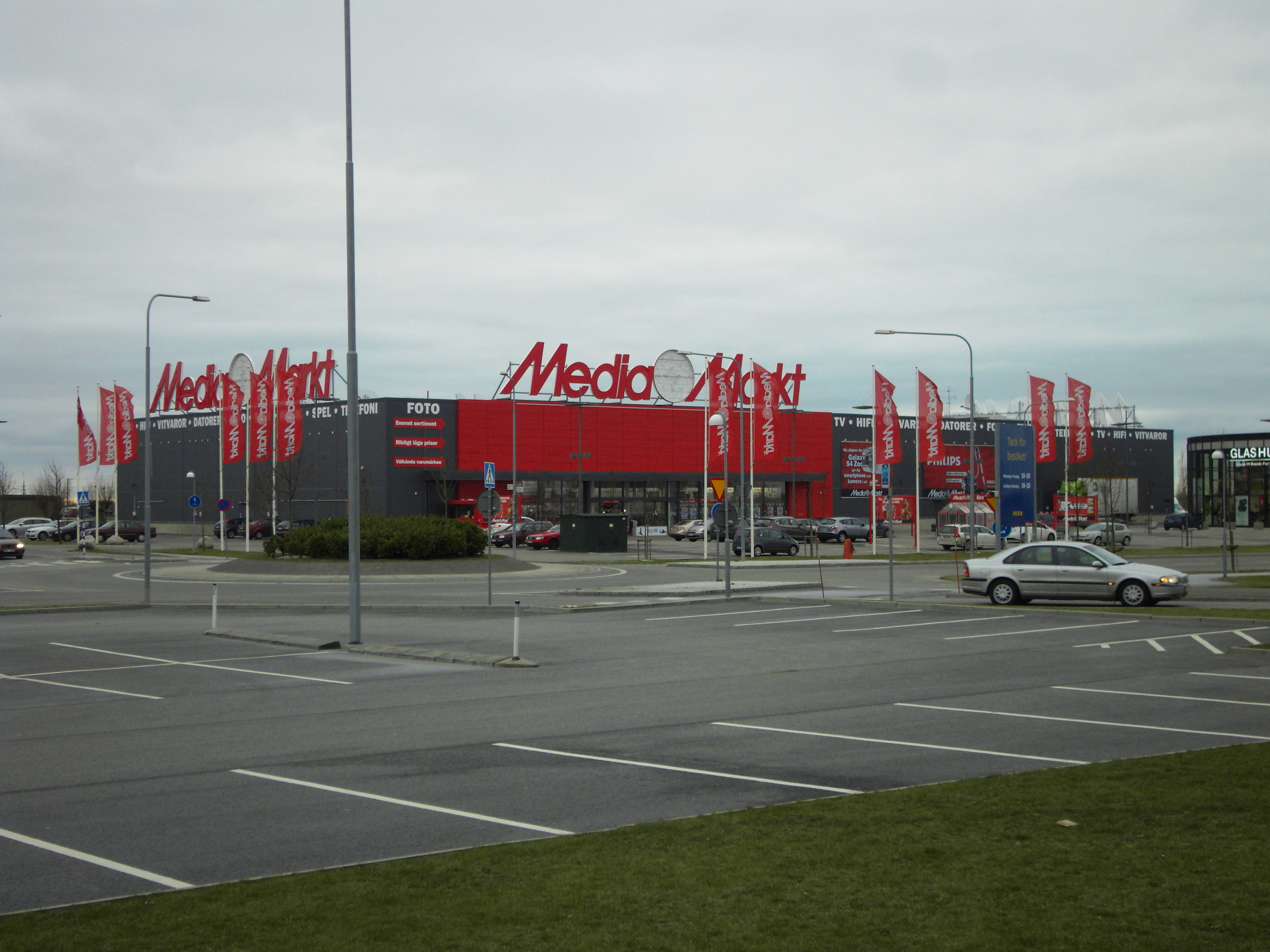
MediaMarkt store in Malmö, Sweden

Countries in which MediaMarkt operates

In Italy, the MediaWorld brand is used instead of MediaMarkt.

=== Franchise model ===
Every store is 10% owned by the store manager. Store managers have discretion as to which products to stock, range, pricing, personnel and material costs.

Country	Stores
Germany	396(includes 125 Saturn stores)
Italy	139 (as MediaWorld)
Spain	112
Turkey	94
Poland	85
Austria	56
Netherlands	54
Switzerland	45
Hungary	40
Belgium	26
Luxembourg	2

=== Former locations ===
Country	Stores	Closed Year	Fate
Greece	13	2023	Sold to Public Group
Portugal	10	2023	Sold to Fnac Darty, then rebranded to Darty in 2025
Russia	46	2018	Sold to M.Video
Sweden	29	2023	Sold to Power Sverige AB

== Advertising ==
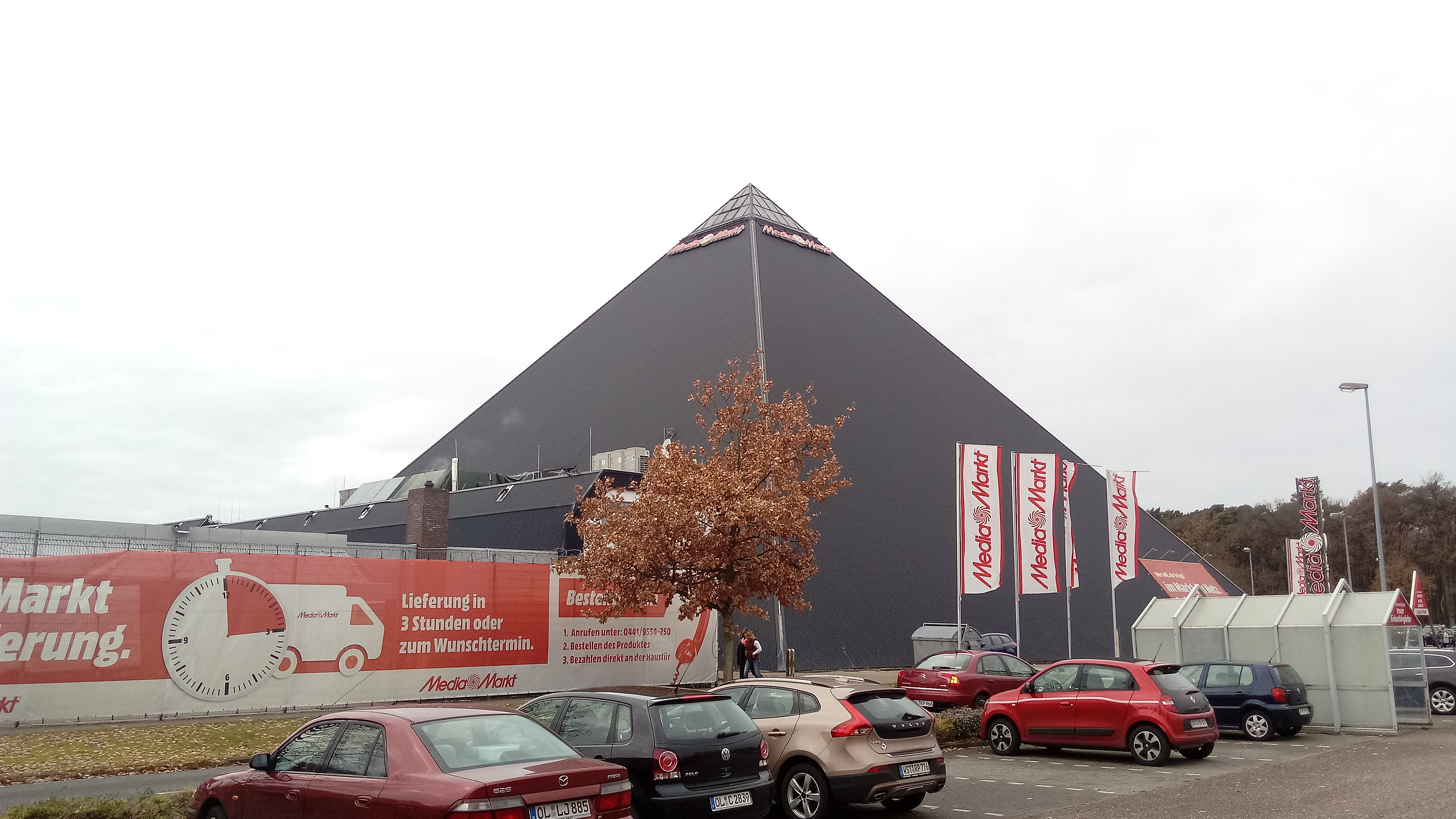
MediaMarkt store in Oldenburg, Germany

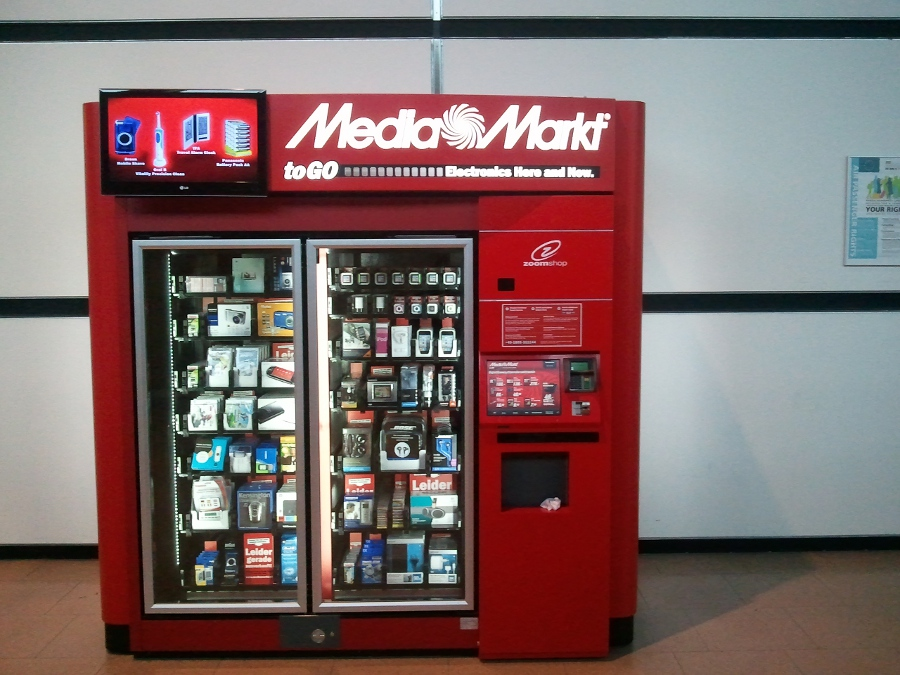
MediaMarkt vending machine at Hamburg Airport, Germany

MediaMarkt had an aggressive advertising similar to American companies and also a few controversial commercials in the 2000s. It is known in Germany for its humorous, but sometimes crude, advertising campaigns; for example, the slogan "Lasst euch nicht verarschen" meaning "Don't let yourself be conned", literally verbal prefix for- (ver-) + ass (Arsch) + infinitive suffix -en (-en).

The advertising campaigns of the brands MediaMarkt and Saturn are designed by the internal marketing organization redblue Marketing GmbH in Munich.

=== Slogan ===
MediaMarkt's main slogan "Ich bin doch nicht blöd" (I'm not stupid) has been translated into the languages of the other countries where the company operates, except Italian and Russian:

Language	Slogan
German	Ich bin doch nicht blöd? (I'm not stupid right?)
Spanish	¡Yo no soy tonto! (I am not a fool!)
Dutch	Ik ben toch niet gek? (I'm not crazy right?)
French	Je ne suis pas fou. (I'm not crazy)
Galician	Eu non son parvo! (I am not a fool!)
Greek	Δεν είμαι και χτεσινός! (I was not born yesterday!)
Hungarian	Mert hülye azért nem vagyok! (Because I'm not stupid)
Italian	Fatto apposta per me! (Just made for me), in Italy Non sono mica scemo! (I am not stupid!), in Italian-speaking Switzerland
Polish	Nie dla idiotów. (Not for idiots), later: Tu wszystko działa dla ciebie. (Everything works for you here.)
Portuguese	Eu é que não sou parvo! (It's not me who's a fool!)
Russian	Покупки - улёт! Сам не отдам! (These purchases are fantastic! I wouldn't give them up for anything!)
Swedish	Allt annat känns puckat! (Everything else seems stupid!)
Catalan	Jo no sóc tonto! (I am not stupid)
Basque	Ni ez naiz inozoa! (I am not stupid)
Turkish	Bakmadan almam. (I don't buy without seeing it.)

In 2022, the brand changed the original slogan into more internationalized "Let's Go!", as a part of a rebranding under MediaMarktSaturn.

== Criticism ==
=== 2006 World Cup advertising campaign ===
Prior to the 2006 World Cup, MediaMarkt launched a campaign, claiming to be the "best fan supplier" ("Bester Fanausrüster"), with commercials showing international football fans shopping at MediaMarkt, showing exaggerated stereotypes of the participating countries, and making fun of the Austria team, which did not qualify. This included a French seductress, Dutch fans smoking marijuana in caravans, or a Saudi haggling - to pay more. German fans were portrayed with big bellies, asking for refrigerators to keep their beer cool, rather than looking for a new TV set.

An additional series of ads, promoting a rebate of €10 for each goal Germany scores (except penalty shoot-outs), showed international soccer fans begging the Germans to score as many goals as possible - against their own team.

When the Netherlands lost to Portugal, MediaMarkt used a quote from a 1980s show featuring Rudi Carrell, a Dutchman who was a long-time TV celebrity in Germany, to express Schadenfreude. A World Cup trophy is shown to grieving Dutch fans in their caravan with the comment "This would have been your prize!".

=== Polish advertising ===
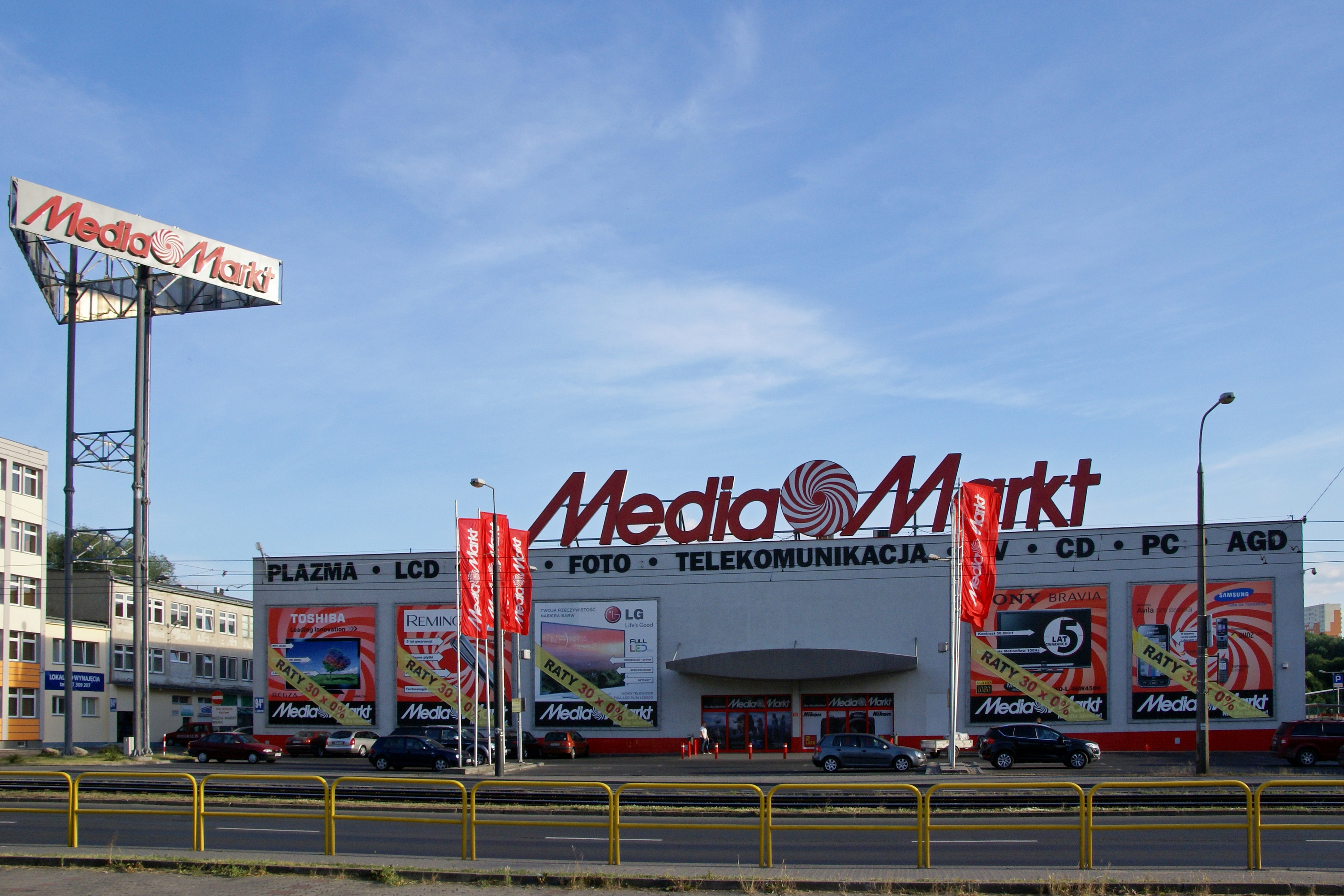
MediaMarkt store in Bydgoszcz, Poland

In March 2006, the "Poland version" showed moustache-wearing Polish customers praising the shop for "prices deep like Polish soul" before hugging the German sales managers, who looked quite uncomfortable in the bear hugs. Afterwards, one of the Germans pointed out that his watch was still there, and that "The Pole is an honest person, after all". Then, the three men are shown to be missing their trousers.

This commercial caused a scandal in Poland, for the widely known unfounded German stereotype of Poles being thieves. MediaMarkt argued that the advertisements also made fun of other national clichés, including Germans, and none of the other clichés were perceived as negative towards the people they presented. It aimed to exaggerate the cliché of the Polish thief to dismiss it as unjustified prejudice, MediaMarkt claimed.

The store apologised and withdrew the advert after their Polish branch asked to do so, following protests in Poland, a call from the Polish embassy in Berlin and protests from German Polonia.

=== Portuguese advertising ===
In January 2008, coinciding with the opening of its 500th overall store in Europe (located in Alfragide), MediaMarkt launched a campaign presenting a fictitious country called Parvónia ("Dumb Land"), where several characters with Eastern European accents were presented as being from this country, which even has an anthem. A central theme of this campaign presented a Boy Scout as an idiot. This really upset people as many consider Scouts to be responsible and valued members of society. An online petition was created to persuade MediaMarkt to withdraw the campaign and to offer a public apology. Due to this petition and a lot of pressure from the Scouting movement, on February 7, MediaMarkt had to remove the Boy Scout from their campaign, including TV and radio ads, while also suspending the Parvónia campaign from television.

=== Turkish advertising ===
Turkish Union Association in Eskişehir, Turkey motivated suspension of an advertisement campaign by the group on grounds that MediaMarkt "insulted Turkishness" by depicting consumers that purchased overpriced merchandise with animal heads. A ban of the advertisements lasted for three months in 2009. There have been many accusations on their official Facebook fan page about their false product advertisements in Turkey.

=== Saubillig ===
A former German campaign played on the German expression "saubillig" which means extremely cheap, but literally "sow (female pig) cheap". Sau- is a common emphasising prefix in colloquial German. Inside the stores, the entrances were signposted as "Schweingang" = wordplay on the word Eingang (Entrance) and Schwein (pig), and the exit as "Sausgang" = wordplay on the word Ausgang (Exit) and the German word for sow (Sau) - the female pig.

== Controversies ==
=== Misleading advertising methods ===
==== Article without VAT ====
MediaMarkt promised in 2005 a promotion to sell items "without VAT" (with a discount equal to VAT). The prices for these items had previously been increased in order to actually achieve the normal price. A competitor sued a branch in Mannheim.

==== Decoy offers ====
The MediaMarktSaturn Retail Group has made bait-and-switch in the past: articles were advertised extensively at extremely low prices but were sold out within a very short time. According to case law on the law against unfair competition (UWG) advertised special offers must be available for at least two days. Consumer advocates criticized that this was often not guaranteed at MediaMarkt and Saturn. The group denied that; there were only a few exceptions despite large stocks. It is generally difficult to provide concrete evidence of such cases, since consumer protection groups do not have access to the delivery dates of the companies.

==== Price Guarantee ====
In 2005, samples from the Frankfurter Allgemeine Zeitung in the Munich area showed that MediaMarkt or Saturn stores were more expensive in 15 out of 21 cases than local competitors. In Berlin they were 11 out of 21 cases. The MediaMarktSaturn Retail Group countered the allegations with a "price guarantee" that promised buyers a refund of the price difference if they found the product at a lower price in another shop.

==== 0% financing ====
In 2013, 0% financing from the Spanish bank Banco Santander was criticized. A credit loss insurance that costs 10% is taken out only on a note in the small print.

=== The exclusive sale of Intel PCs ===
According to research published by the Financial Times Germany in 2008, the MediaMarktSaturn Retail Group committed to Intel in 1999 to only sell PCs with Intel processors. The holding company received 85 million euros in purchase discounts and advertising grants from Intel in 2007 alone. The European antitrust authorities investigated the distortion of competition. Intel was fined 1.06 billion euros in May 2009 by the European Union's competition authority for these and other antitrust violations.

The retail chain was moved by Intel's discount system to have only insignificant or no computers with AMD processors on offer. According to the European Commission, Intel has made direct and indirect payments to MSH since 1997. The payments were subject to the condition that, if possible, only offer Intel systems.

=== Body searches ===
In 2014, in Krems an der Donau in Lower Austria, theft of the MediaMarkt, which is said to have been committed by employees, not only carried out bag checks, as is common in many companies but also body searches on all employees. The unions see this as a violation of human dignity. As a consequence, employees of other branches in Austria reported this procedure. This approach was blamed on the security service providers by the company.

=== Antitrust proceedings ===
On June 13, 2014, the Austrian Federal Competition Authority (BWB) announced a decision by the cartel court on April 23, 2014, against Media-Saturn Beteiligungs gmbH. A fine of 1,230,000 euros was imposed for vertical price matching of retail prices with the electronics industry between October 2009 and early 2013.

== Competitors ==
The US Best Buy Group is the global market leader by sales in the consumer electronics sector. As of May 2016, MediaMarktSaturn and Best Buy have so far only competed with each other in Turkey. The Euronics retail group is the second largest competitor in Europe.
