= Wilhelm Schmidt-Ruthenbeck =

German entrepreneur

Wilhelm Schmidt-Ruthenbeck (1906–1988) was a German entrepreneur, the co-founder of the retail chain Metro AG.

== Biography ==
In 1963, Schmidt-Ruthenbeck founded, together with his brother Ernst Schmidt, the German company Metro AG.

== Family ==
Schmidt-Ruthenbeck was married with Vera Ruthenbeck. His children were Michael Schmidt-Ruthenbeck, Rainer Schmidt-Ruthenbeck, and Viola Schmidt-Ruthenbeck.

His father was Karl Schmidt, who founded in 1923 in Duisburg the company Karl Schmidt OGH. In the 1990s his family founded the Stiftung Mercator, the Mercator Schweiz and the Karl Schmidt Family Foundation.
