= Erich Kellerhals =

German billionaire (1939–2017)

- Born: 8 November 1939; Ingolstadt, Germany
- Died: 25 December 2017 (aged 78); Salzburg, Austria
- Known for: co-founder of Media-Saturn-Holding GmbH, owner of Media Markt
- Spouse: Helga Kellerhals
- Children: 1

Erich Kellerhals (8 November 1939 – 25 December 2017) was a German billionaire, co-founder of Media-Saturn-Holding GmbH, owner of Media Markt. In March 2017, his net worth was estimated at US$1.8 billion.

== Career ==
Erich and Helga Kellerhals, together with Walter Gunz and Leopold Stiefel, co-founded Media-Saturn-Holding GmbH, owner of Media Markt.

== Personal life ==
He was married with one child, and lived in Ingolstadt, Germany.
