= Ceconomy =

German retail company

Ceconomy AG

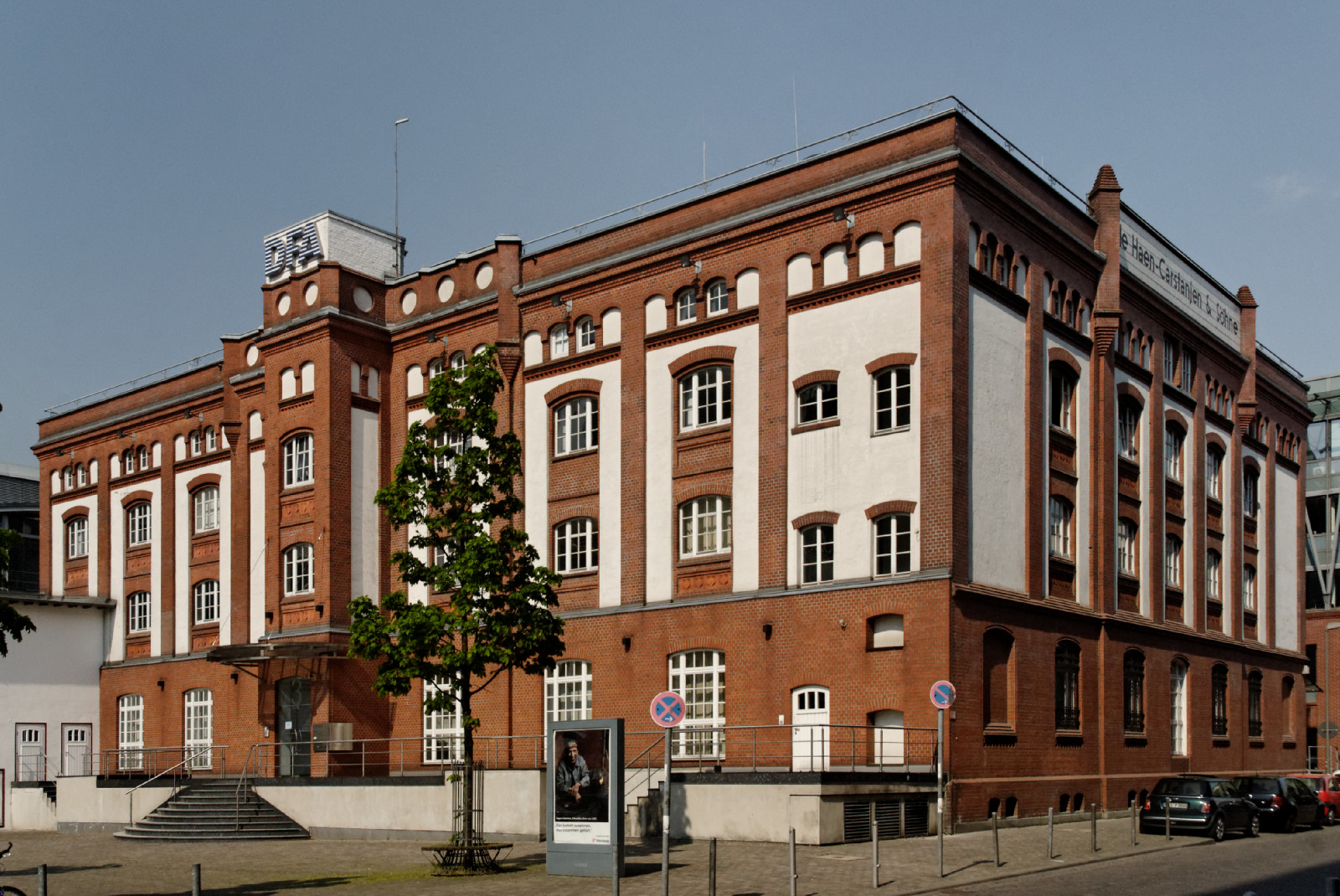
- Headquarters in Düsseldorf-Hafen
- Type: Public
- Traded as: FWB: CEC; FWB: MEOD (ADR); OTCID Basic Current: MTAGF; OTCID Basic Current: MTTRY (ADR); SDAX component (CEC)
- ISIN: DE0007257503; US1500421094
- Industry: Retail
- Predecessor: Metro AG
- Founded: 2017; 9 years ago (original group was founded in 1996)
- Headquarters: Düsseldorf, Germany
- Number of locations: 1,024 (2022)
- Key people: Kai-Ulrich Deissner (CEO); Remko Rijnders (CFO)
- Products: Consumer electronics and related services
- Brands: MediaMarkt and Saturn
- Revenue: €21.8 billion (2022)
- Owner: JD.com (59.8%)
- Number of employees: 50,000 (2022)
- Website: www.ceconomy.de

Ceconomy AG is an international retail company headquartered in Düsseldorf, Germany. Its history goes back to the Metro Group. Ceconomy operates more than 1,000 consumer electronics stores in eleven countries. In addition to MediaMarkt and Saturn, the group owns Deutsche Technikberatung. Approximately 24 % of its sales are generated online.

In July 2025, JD.com agreed to acquire Ceconomy for €2.2 billion.

== History ==
In March 2016, Metro announced a comprehensive reorganization of its business units. Wholesale and food retailing were to be continued separately from the consumer electronics centers. For Cash & Carry and Real, the company wanted to retain the "Metro" name. MediaMarkt and Saturn were henceforth to be managed under the umbrella of "Ceconomy". The reorganization was completed in July 2017. Since then, Ceconomy and Metro have functioned as independent sister companies. Both entities maintained their listing on the stock exchange.

Ceconomy started as a leading European electronics retailer. To build on this position, the company focused on diversifying and internationalizing its activities. Examples include the acquisition of a majority stake in Deutsche Technikberatung and a minority stake in French electronics retailer Fnac Darty.

In response to increased competition in retail, Ceconomy developed closer cooperation with Fnac Darty and M.video, but did not realize those plans. The Fnac Darty affiliation caused conflict with MediaMarkt co-founder Erich Kellerhals. There was a controversy between Ceconomy and Convergenta over the company's strategy and board appointments, which ended in 2020.

The MediaMarkt Tech Villiage Hamburg store is the largest contiguous electronics store in Europe, covering an area of 15,000 square meters over 5 floors.

In July 2025, Chinese e-commerce company JD.com agreed to acquire Ceconomy for €2.2 billion.. The Bundeskartellamt (Federal Cartel Office of Germany) assessed in September 2025 that the competitive effects of a proposed merger were negligible and cleared the acquisition. In May 2026 the Directorate-General for Competition of the European Commission started own proceedings regarding subsidies under the foreign trade law.. Regulatory clearance was given on 3 November 2026, and the acquisition was completed on 12 November 2026, with JD.com owning 85.2% of Ceconomy stock.

== Corporate affairs ==
The key trends of Ceconomy are (as at the financial year ending September 30):

Year	Revenue (€ bn)	Net income (€ m)	Employees
2017	22.1	1,102	68,804
2018	21.4	–212	61,962
2019	21.4	122	59,421
2020	20.8	–232	57,739
2021	21.3	232	54,966
2022	21.7	126	53,889
2023	22.2	–39	52,547
2024	22.4	76	50,918

== Operations ==
The current executive board consists of Karsten Wildberger (CEO) and Kai-Ulrich Deissner (CFO). The supervisory board is headed by Thomas Dannenfeldt.

== Businesses ==
The core of Ceconomy's business activities is the sale of consumer electronics and the installation and repair of related products. The subsidiaries operate largely independently. Ceconomy is increasingly focusing on linking its stores with online retailing. The omnichannel strategy is seen as the most important building block for further development of the Ceconomy group.

Media-Saturn-Holding (or MediaMarktSaturn Retail Group), headquartered in Ingolstadt, bundles business under the MediaMarkt and Saturn brands. The formerly independent retail chains have been affiliated under company law since 1990. The first MediaMarkt store opened in Munich in 1979, the first Saturn store in 1961 on Cologne's Hansaring.

Deutsche Technikberatung (DTB for short), headquartered in Hürth, Germany, is a service company that supports customers with questions about consumer electronics. This includes not only the installation and configuration of devices but also pre-purchase advice. The technicians work either on-site or via remote maintenance.
