= Saturn (store) =

German electronics store chain

Saturn store logo

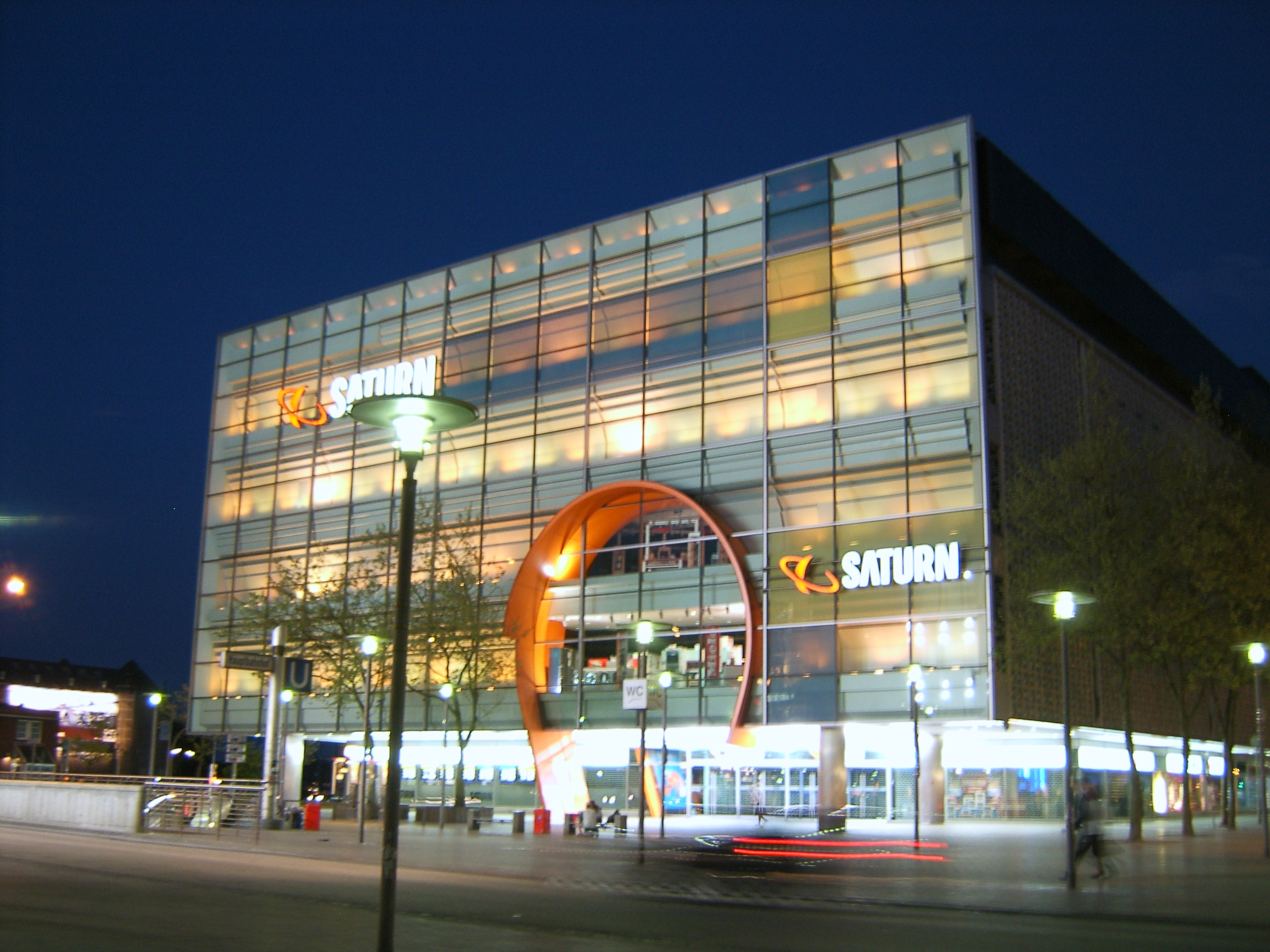
Saturn store in Hamburg at night (rebranded as MediaMarkt in 2024)

Saturn is a German chain of electronics stores in Germany. With MediaMarkt it constitutes MediaMarktSaturn Retail Group, owned by the retail trade company Ceconomy, which was spun-off from Metro Group in 2017.

Saturn is known for its slightly coarse advertising slogan Geiz ist geil! (German for 'Stinginess is cool!') which was used from 2002 to 2011 and sparked a nationwide debate about consumer behavior and the situation of the German economy. The slogan quickly became part of everyday language and became synonymous with the German economic crisis.

The Saturn brand has been largely superseded in Germany and abroad, with most stores rebranding to sister brand MediaMarkt and several others being closed. By November 2026, only six Saturn stores in Germany remained.

== History ==
The first Saturn-Hansa-Markt was opened in July 1961 by Friedrich Wilhelm and Anni Waffenschmidt at Cologne's Hansaring. Consumer electronics items were mainly sold to "diplomats from all over the world" on 120 m². In 1968 the two founded the company Hansa-Foto. Since 1969, private customers have also been able to shop at Saturn and Hansa-Foto. In 1972, the Waffenschmidts opened the first technical department store in Cologne with what they claimed to be the "largest phonograph record in the world". In the early 1980s, a large branch was opened on the Theresienhöhe in Munich, followed in 1985 by a branch in Frankfurt with the participation of Kaufhof. Saturn was acquired by the Media Markt holding company in 1990, both of which were merged into the MediaMarktSaturn Retail Group.

In 1992 there were seven Saturn Hansa stores (Cologne, Frankfurt, Munich, Dortmund, Hanover, Nuremberg, Gelsenkirchen).

Saturn shops are usually between 2,000 m^{2} (22,000 sq ft) and 10,000 m^{2} (110,000 sq ft) in size. An exception can be found in Hamburg with 18,000 m^{2} (190,000 sq ft) and six floors which makes it one of the largest electronics shops in the world. Its origins relate to the merger of the Horten and Kaufhof department stores in 1995. In Hamburg, Kaufhof and Horten had stores side by side in Mönckebergstraße, at the central train station. Both Saturn and Kaufhof were part of Metro Group, so the Horten store was closed and occupied in 1999 with the electronics store.

By 2024, Ceconomy began refurbishing several Saturn stores in Germany and renaming them under the MediaMarkt brand in the process. This included the store in Hamburg at Mönckebergstraße, which reopened as a MediaMarkt flagship store (Tech Village) in September 2024 with a reduced retail space of around 15,000 m^{2} (160,000 sq ft). By November 2026, only six stores in Germany remained open under the Saturn brand, with at least four more to close by early 2027.

== Corporate affairs ==
In December 2021, there are 137 Saturn stores in Germany and two in Luxembourg. By November 2026, only six stores in Germany remained.

On 1 July 2011 the 34 Saturn stores in France were sold to the HTM Group.

Saturn stores in Austria, Belgium, Greece, Hungary, Luxembourg, the Netherlands, Poland, Russia, Spain, Switzerland and Turkey have been rebranded as Media Markt and in Italy as Media World.
