= Mein Real =

German hypermarket chain

Mein real

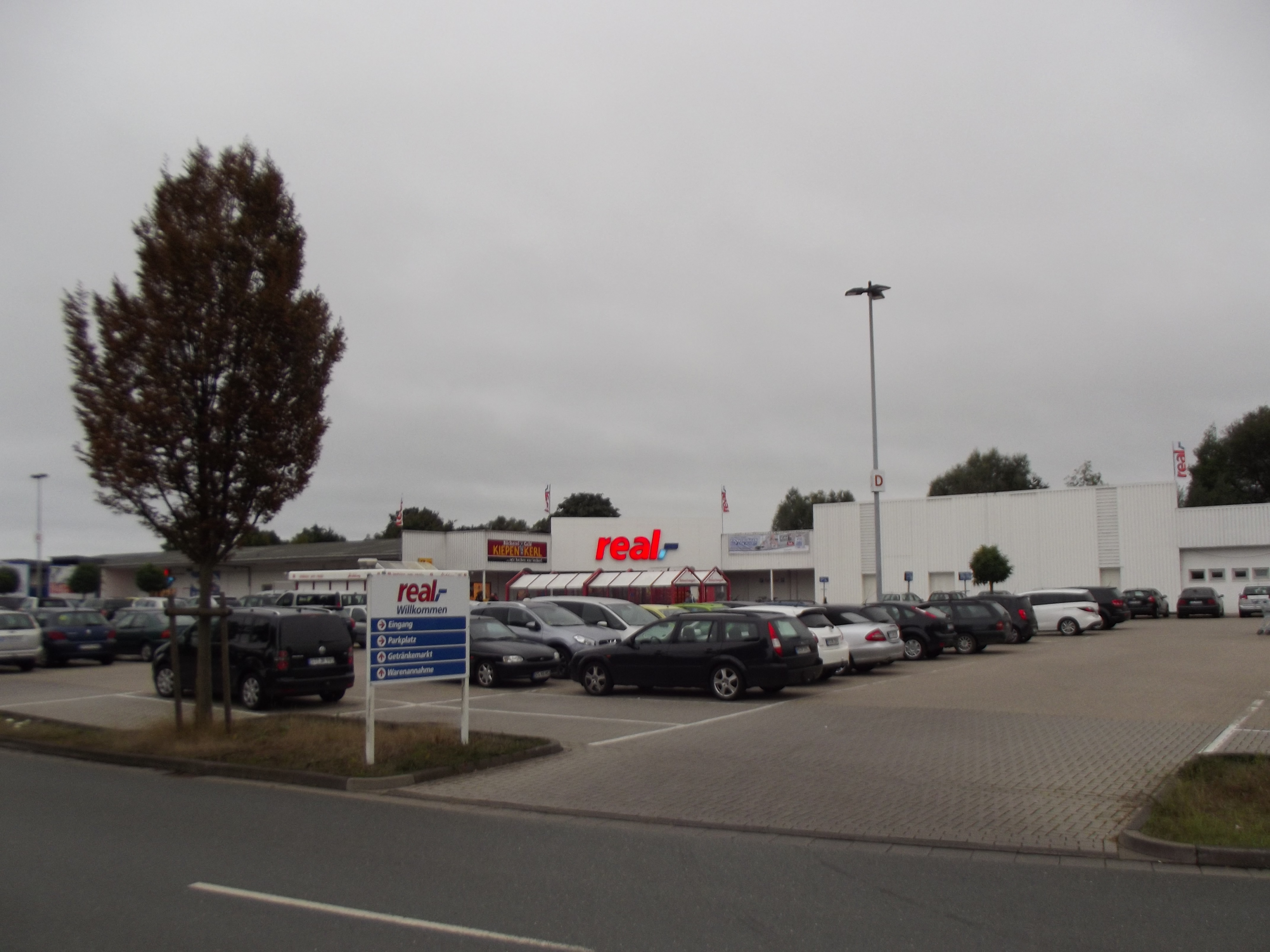
- Former real hypermarket in Nordwalde, Germany
- Type: Private
- Industry: Retail
- Predecessors: allkauf Basar; Continent divi Esbella; Massa real-kauf Walmart (Germany); Géant (Poland)
- Founded: 1992
- Defunct: 2024
- Fate: Bankruptcy And Liquidation
- Successors: Edeka; Globus; Kaufland; Rewe; Auchan (international operations); Remarkt (Romania); Bi1 (Poland)
- Headquarters: Mönchengladbach, Germany
- Area served: Germany
- Number of employees: 5,000 (2023)
- Parent: The SCP Group
- Website: meinreal.de

Mein Real (stylized mein real; real until 2022 and real,- until 2017) was a chain of hypermarkets in Germany owned by Metro AG until 2020 when it was sold to The SCP Group. It was formed in 1992, from the merger of chains divi, Basar, Continent, Esbella and real-kauf. Until 2014 it was also active internationally, in Poland, Romania, Russia, Ukraine and Turkey; most of these operations were bought by French retail company Auchan Group. In 2018, Metro decided to divest the Real chain and in 2021, many markets were taken over by either Edeka, Kaufland, Globus, Rewe or V-Markt and got rebranded with the brand of the respective new owner. The process of selling was finished by mid of 2022. However, the original plans to liquidate real completely were dropped in early 2022 when it was decided that the remaining 60 stores would continue under the real brand name under new ownership. Real's former website (real.de) was replaced by kaufland.de in 2021. In 2022, the remaining stores were rebranded as Mein Real.

In September 2023, the remaining company filed for bankruptcy. After some rescue attempts had failed, the remaining 45 stores that were not taken over by competitors were closed by the end of March 2024 and the company finally ceased trading and was liquidated.

== History ==
The real brand first appeared in 1992 when Asko AG merged the brands of their hypermarkets divi, Basar, Continent, Esbella and real-kauf into real to give them a unified brand name and corporate design. In 1995, Massa AG was taken over by Asko AG, and in 1998 Allkauf, with their hypermarkets being rebranded as real as well.

In 2006, Metro acquired Walmart's 85 stores in Germany and 26 Géant hypermarkets in Poland from the French retail group Groupe Casino.

In November 2012, Metro sold its 91 Real hypermarkets in Poland, Romania, Russia and Ukraine to Auchan for €1.1 billion. In 2014, it sold its 12 Real hypermarkets in Turkey.

In September 2018, Metro AG announced the split from Real and sale of all hypermarkets, and in February 2020, Real was sold to The SCP Group owned by Russian oligarch Vladimir Yevtushenkov.

In April 2021, after the new owner The SCP Group had decided to liquidate Real and sell all outlets, the Real brand began to cease being used as a brand for hypermarkets. 270 outlets were sold to other supermarket chains and got rebranded with the brand of the respective new owner, while more than 40 markets were or will be closed. The previous owner's planned goal was to complete a liquidation of Real by the end of June 2022. Locations without subsequent use should be closed.

In January 2022, however, it was announced that the remaining 60 real stores that are not being sold will not be closed, but will continue to operate as real in the future. As planned, the previous owner is withdrawing from the plan to break up real on 30 June 2022, and is selling the remaining locations to a restructuring company headed by the Frankfurt lawyer Sven Tischendorf. Restructuring is planned to ensure long-term continuation under the real brand. The Real headquarters in Düsseldorf will be dissolved as planned, and a successor company under the name real Service und Verwaltungs GmbH in Frankfurt am Main will take over some of the tasks. Purchasing and logistics are taken over by an external provider. On 13 April 2022, the Federal Cartel Office approved a purchasing cooperation between Rewe and Real.

With the change of ownership of real, the brand identity also changed. The real brand was given up on 1 July 2022, and the locations were rebranded as mein real (my real), and the long-standing claim Einmal hin. Alles drin., which has been part of the company since 2008, was replaced with alles was ich mag!.

On 30 September 2023, Mein Real filed an application to commence insolvency proceedings under self-administration. All 5,000 employees, all 62 stores and the corporate headquarters are to be affected as part of the insolvency. Salaries will continue to be paid for employees working for the company. On November 20, 2023, it was announced that 18 stores would be taken over by competitors (13 stores to Rewe, three to Kaufland and one store to Edeka), while the remaining 45 stores that did not find a new owner would be closed by the end of March 2024. With the closure and sale of the remaining stores, real GmbH ceased business operations.

== Logos ==
Logo of real until 2017

Logo of real until 30 June 2022

Logo of Mein Real since 1 July 2022

== Products ==
As well as food, Real also offers a wide assortment of household goods, electrical appliances, books, media, textiles and footwear (sports and regular footwear were concessions owned by Hamm Market Solutions GmbH & Co KG, based in Osnabruck, Germany), sports goods, and stationery. In addition to branded products, several store brands were offered including discount label TiP (Toll im Preis - Great Price), mid-price real Quality, premium brand realSelection, real Bio organic products and Watson consumer electronics.

== Assets ==
=== Current ===
- real Quality
- realSelection
- real Bio
- Watson
- meinreal.de

=== Former ===
- real.digital - renamed to Kaufland E-Commerce
- real2business - renamed to marketplaceworld
- TiP - replaced by Jeden Tag
- real.de - redirects to kaufland.de
- Payback real club cards
- real Future Store - brand discontinued and then converted to an ordinary real store in 2013
- real Poland - converted to Auchan
- real Russia - converted to Auchan (Ашан)
- real Ukraine
- real Romania - converted to Auchan and then renamed to remarkt
- real Turkey

== See also ==
- Metro AG
