= Metro AG =

German multinational wholesaling company

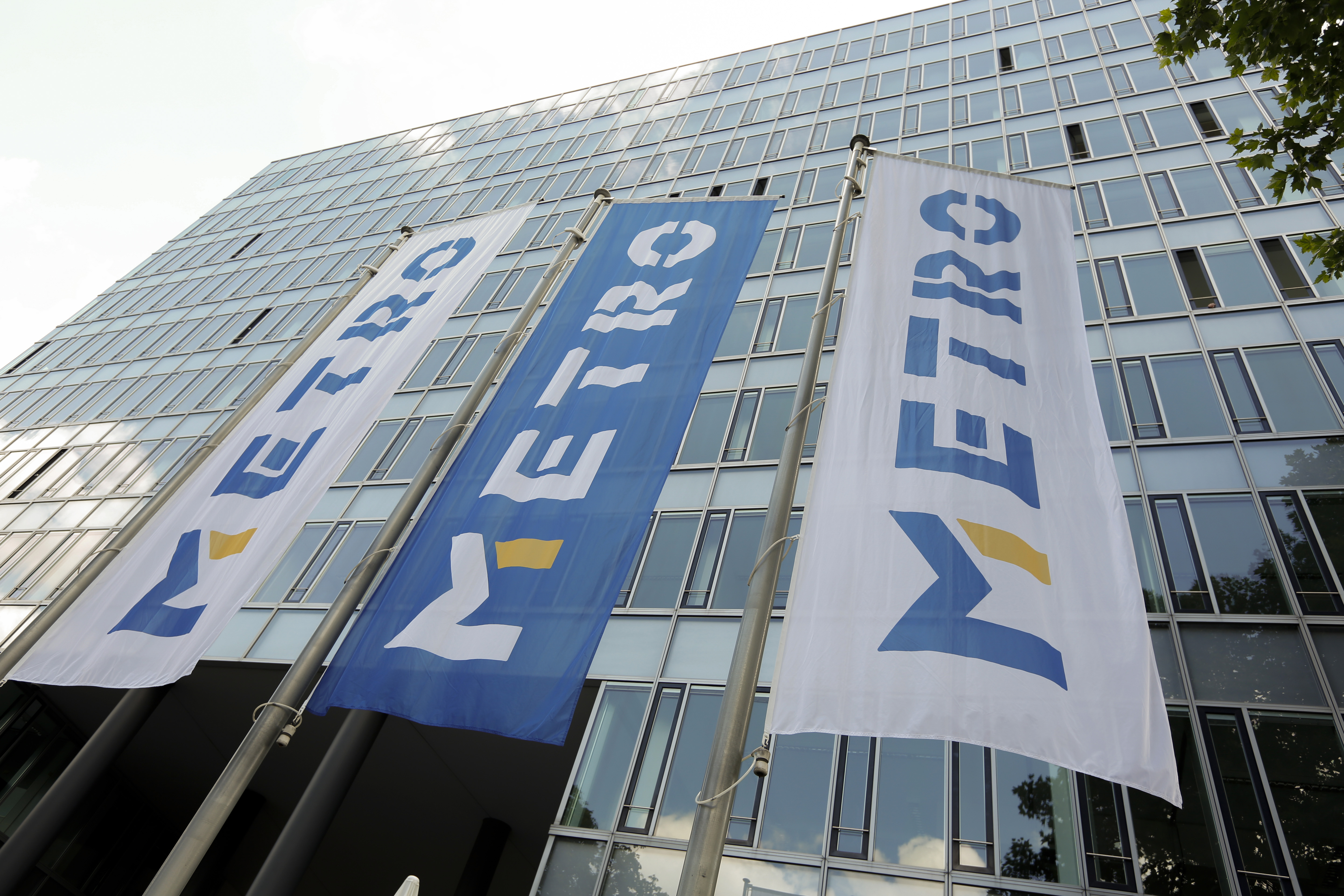
- Metro AG head office in Düsseldorf
- Type: Aktiengesellschaft
- Industry: Wholesaling
- Founded: 1964; 62 years ago as Metro-SB-Großmarkt GmbH & Co. KG; 1996; 30 years ago as Metro AG; 2017; 9 years ago as Metro AG (new company)
- Headquarters: Düsseldorf, Germany
- Number of locations: 622 (2025)
- Area served: Europe and Pakistan
- Key people: Eric Riegger (Chairman); Roman Šilha (Chairman of the supervisory board)
- Products: Food and non-food assortments
- Revenue: ▲€32.447 billion (2024–2025)
- Operating income: ▼€196 million (2024–2025)
- Net income: ▼€-224 million (2024–2025)
- Total assets: ▲€12.0 billion (2024–2025)
- Total equity: ▼€1.504 billion (2024–2025)
- Number of employees: 86,740 (2024–2025)
- Parent: EP Global Commerce
- Website: www.metroag.de

Metro AG logo from 2010 until 2016, branded as "Metro Group"

Metro AG (German pronunciation: [ˈmeːtʁo]) is a German multinational food wholesaler based in Düsseldorf. Metro supplies hotels, restaurants, caterers and independent retailers through its cash-and-carry stores and by delivering directly to customers. Its stores operate mainly under the Metro and Makro brands. At the end of September 2025, it operated 622 wholesale stores in 21 countries. Metro is controlled by EP Group through EP Global Commerce.

Ernst Schmidt and Wilhelm Schmidt-Ruthenbeck opened the first Metro store in Essen in 1963. The company's wholesale business was established the following year in Mülheim an der Ruhr. In 2017, the former Metro AG spun off its wholesale business and the Real hypermarket chain into a separate company. The original company retained its consumer electronics business and became Ceconomy. Metro sold Real in 2020, and its shares were delisted from the Frankfurt Stock Exchange in 2025.

== History ==
=== 1963–1980 ===
Metro began on 8 November 1963 in Essen with the opening of the first wholesale centre under the name Metro by the brothers Ernst Schmidt and Wilhelm Schmidt-Ruthenbeck. Planning and opening of the first hypermarket under the name Metro in Essen was the responsibility of Walter Vieth, who was managing director there from 1963 to 1970.

In 1964, a year after the opening of the first Metro store, the Stöcker & Reinshagen company (the Schell family) planned a cash and carry store in Mülheim an der Ruhr. During construction, the businessmens Schmidt-Ruthenbeck, Schmidt and Schell met and decided to merge their cash and carry activities. So they founded Metro-SB-Großmarkt GmbH & Co. KG with headquarters in Mülheim, later in Düsseldorf. Otto Beisheim, until 1964 authorised signatory of the company Stöcker & Reinshagen, became the sole managing director. In 1966, the third Metro was opened in West Berlin.

In 1966, Otto Beisheim met Friedrich Wilhelm Lenz, chairman of the management board of Franz Haniel & Cie. and convinced him to invest in Metro. In the course of the following reorganization Beisheim became a shareholder himself. From this point on, the founding family Schmidt-Ruthenbeck and the shareholders Beisheim and Haniel each held about one third of the shares.

Under the sole leadership of Otto Beisheim, a rapid expansion of the Metro stores into the greater German and European area began in 1967 with the opening of the Metro stores in Godorf near Cologne, Hamburg, Munich and, after a connection with the Dutch company SHV Holdings, the first C&C wholesale store (brand: Makro) in the Netherlands, and in 1968 in Düsseldorf.

=== 1980–2000 ===
In 1980, Metro took over 24.9 per cent of Kaufhof.

In March 1996, Metro AG was formed by the merger of Metro Cash & Carry with Kaufhof Holding AG, Deutsche SB-Kauf AG (of the insolvent company co op AG), and Asko Deutsche Kaufhaus AG (emerged from Allgemeine Saar Konsum, in which a Metro investment company had previously held shares). The group also included the Huma shopping centres, the sports retail stores Primus Sportwelt, MHB Handel AG and the office supplies and stationery manufacturer Pelikan, as well as Media-Saturn, the consumer electronics business of Media Markt and Saturn. The share of Metro AG was founded retrospectively on 1 January and listed on 22 July 1996 on the Frankfurt Stock Exchange and was part of the DAX until 2012.

In 1998, the computer retailers Vobis and Maxdata, the Adler fashion stores and Reno's shoe retailers, the discounter TiP, Möbel Roller and unprofitable Kaufhof branches were brought into the subsidiary Divaco, which was founded together with Deutsche Bank and the Gerling Group, in order to attract new buyers. In 1998, the 94 Allkauf -S department stores were bought, as was Allkauf Touristik Vertriebs GmbH with 160 travel agencies, which were sold again by Metro.

=== 2000–2020 ===
In December 2003, Metro separated from its stake in Divaco KG and sold its shares to the sole shareholder and CEO, Siegfried Kaske, for 1 euro. In 2004, Metro bought Adler fashion stores back from Divaco. In 2005, Metro split off the Praktiker home improvement division, which went public as an independent company. In July 2006 Metro bought the 85 German stores of Wal-Mart, which gave up its loss-making Germany business. The Wal-Mart stores were largely integrated into the Real sales brand. In July 2008, the Extra supermarket chain with around 250 locations and sales of around 1.6 billion euro, was sold to the Rewe Group. Metro sold the Adler fashion stores to the associated company BluO in February 2009. In October 2012, Makro-Habib in Pakistan became Metro-Habib. In November 2012, Metro sold its 91 Real hypermarkets in Poland, Romania, Russia and Ukraine to Auchan for 1.1 billion euro. In 2014 Metro sold the 12 Real hypermarkets in Turkey. In 2017 Metro sold the last remaining four Real hypermarkets in Romania.

On 15 June 2015, Metro AG agreed to sell Galeria Kaufhof to Canadian retail conglomerate Hudson's Bay Company for $3.2 billion. On 30 March 2016, Metro Group announced that it would be splitting into two independent companies: A spin-off of the wholesale and food sector of Metro AG will be responsible for the group divisions into two independent and publicly listed companies. Both will have their own management, supervisory board and independent company profiles. Metro AG was renamed Ceconomy, comprising Media Markt and Saturn electronics stores, while a new company with the name Metro AG was formed, comprising Metro Cash & Carry and Real.

In September 2018, Metro announced that it wanted to sell the Real hypermarket subsidiary in Germany to focus entirely on wholesale business.

=== 2020–present ===
In February 2020, Real was sold to The SCP Group. The deal was completed in June 2020. With the acquisition of Johbeco AB and its subsidiary Johan i Hallen & Bergfalk, a Swedish specialist supplier of meat, fish and seafood, for around 100 million euros in May 2023, Metro entered the Swedish and Finnish market.

In April 2025, Metro applied for delisting from the Frankfurt Stock Exchange. With the revocation of its listing, its inclusion in the German SDAX was terminated.

== Controversies ==
Following the 2022 Russian invasion of Ukraine which began on 24 February, many international, particularly Western companies pulled out of Russia. Unlike most of its Western competitors, Metro AG announced its intention to keep its business in Russia open, drawing criticism. Ukrainian government officials have called for a global boycott of the company. The Ukrainian office of MetroAG has allegedly been threatened by the company's headquarters in Germany due to the Ukrainian branch openly calling for sanctions on Metro's Russian branch. According to Ukrainian ex-minister Dmytro Dubilet the Ukrainian branch has received warnings to be disconnected from the centralized supply. In February 2023, the National Agency for the Prevention of Corruption of Ukraine included the company in the list of International Sponsors of War.

Metro Cash and Carry logo

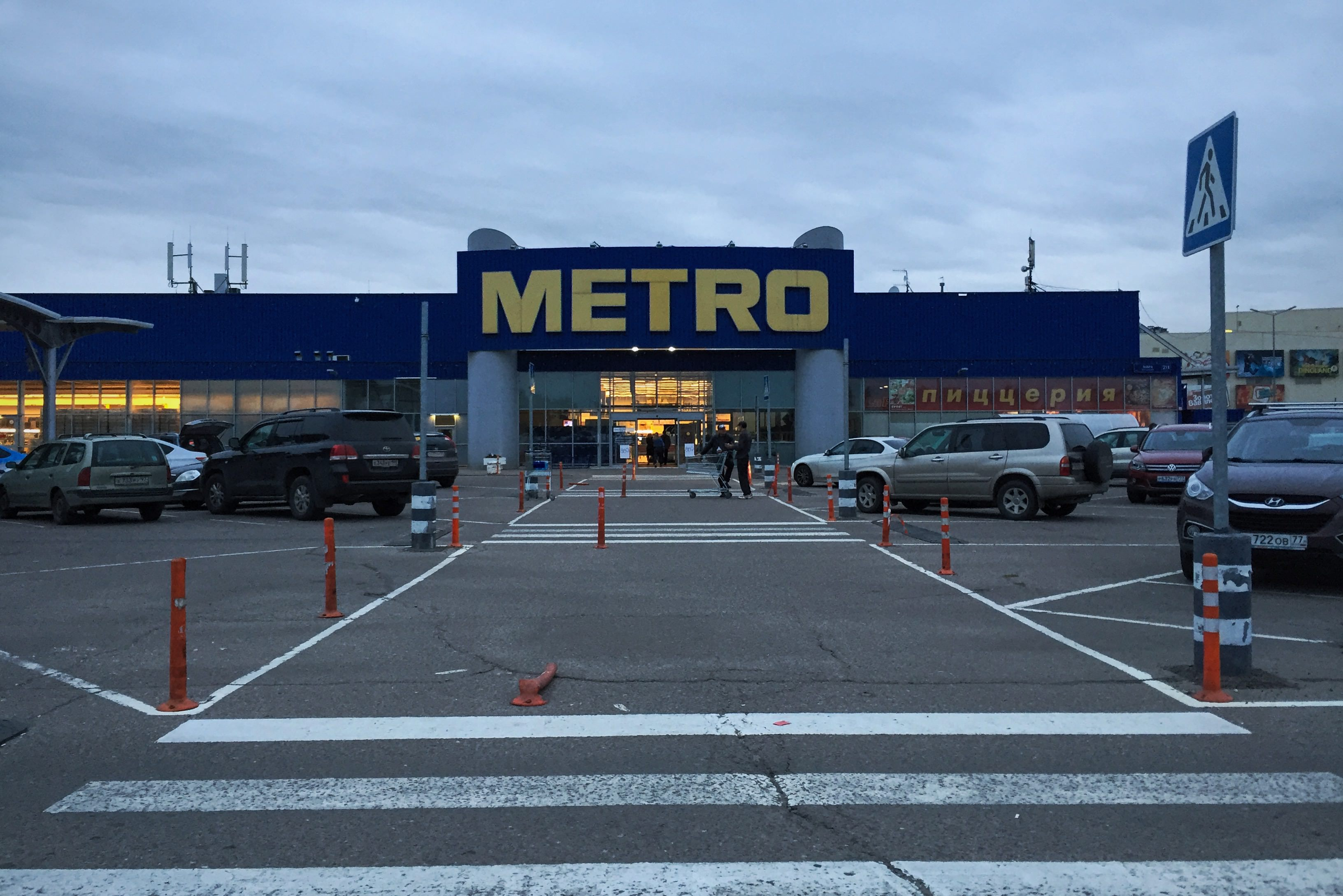
Metro warehouse in Moscow, Russia

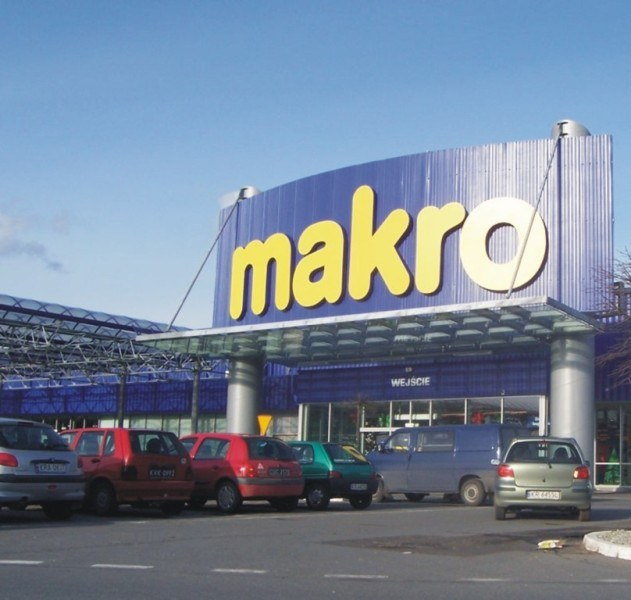
Makro warehouse in Kraków, Poland

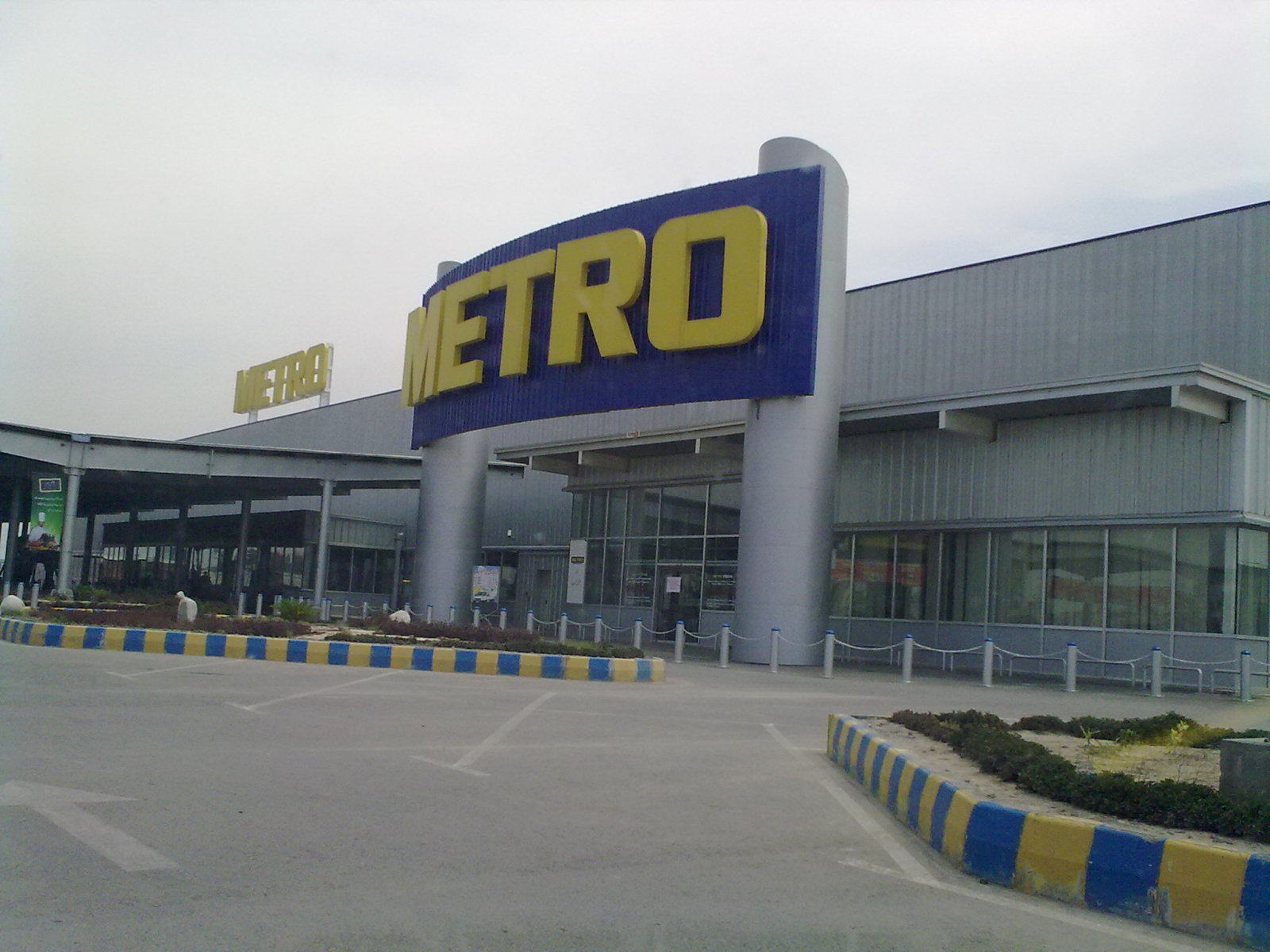
Metro warehouse in Faisalabad, Pakistan

=== Metro in Russia ===
Metro AG is Russia's fourth-biggest retailer behind X5 Group, Magnit and French chain Auchan. The company entered the market in 2001 with the opening of its first wholesale store in Moscow. Over the years, Metro AG has expanded its presence in the country, opening stores in several other cities, including Saint Petersburg, Nizhny Novgorod and Rostov-on-Don. There are 97 stores in 65 cities across the country. In 2022, the company's revenue amounted to 224 billion rubles.

On 22 March 2022, in response to the ongoing war in Ukraine, Metro AG published an official statement expressing solidarity with Ukraine and condemning the war. The company also announced its support for the food and water deliveries of the UN World Food Programme to Ukraine. Despite that, Metro AG made a decision not to leave the Russian market, citing its responsibility to the 10,000 colleagues employed there and the many customers who rely on its stores. The company stated that it is closely monitoring further developments and is committed to supporting "decision-makers in business and politics who are seeking a peaceful solution to the war in Ukraine".

Currently, Metro AG is developing the integration of new projects in Russia, such as the establishment of the grocery store chain Fasol, and the acceptance of payments by Mir cards, a project initiated by Sberbank in response to sanctions. Furthermore, the investigation by the National Agency on Corruption Prevention (NACP) revealed that the key shareholder of Metro Cash & Carry, Daniel Křetínský, controls EP Infrastructure (EPIF), which owns 49% of Eustream, the company that operates a gas transportation system from Russia to Central and Eastern Europe. This fact, combined with the company's actions, led to Metro Cash & Carry being added to the NACP's list of international sponsors of war.

Metro AG's latest quarterly financial results report, which was released on 8 February 2023, indicates a decrease in sales at the chain's stores in Russia. The document states that the sales in local currency decreased by 14.1% in the first quarter of fiscal year 2022–2023; adjusted EBITDA in Russia decreased to €60 million from €81 million in Q1 2021/2022.

On 28 September 2026, Russian President Vladimir Putin placed the assets of Metro AG in Russia under temporary management. Following this takeover, the newly appointed management transferred 1 billion rubles to supply equipment for the Russian military fighting in Ukraine. In response, METRO AG and its Ukrainian branch strongly condemned the donation, clarifying that they have lost all operational control over the Russian subsidiary and strictly oppose financing the war.

=== Former operations ===
Metro sold its Makro subsidiary in Morocco in 2010. In 2012, Metro exited the United Kingdom market through the sale of its 30 Makro stores to Booker Group. In 2014, Metro divested its Greece operations by selling 9 Makro stores to Sklavenitis. In 2014, Metro exited Vietnam by signing an agreement to sell its local subsidiary, consisting of 19 stores, to the Thai group Berli Jucker for €665 million. In December 2014, Metro exited the Denmark market. They had pioneered in-store delivery services nationally since opening their first store in 1971. Egypt had a brief market foray in 2010 with two stores opening, but these were closed between 2013 and 2015.

In April 2020, Metro completed the sale of a majority stake in its Chinese joint venture to Wumei Technology Group for more than €1.5 billion. Metro retained a 20% ownership stake in the venture, which operates 97 wholesale centers across China. In August 2021, Metro ceased operations in Japan, resulting in the closure of all its 10 stores within the country. In September 2021, Metro announced it would end its supply business in Myanmar by the end of October 2021.

In 2022, Metro exited from Belgium through the bankruptcy of its local subsidiary, which operated stores under both the Metro and Makro brands. Notably, Belgium was the only country where Metro had stores under both brands, and it was also unique in allowing general access to its Makro network, typically reserved for business customers. Only Metro wholesale network stores that avoided bankruptcy were subsequently sold and reopened under the Sligro-M brand. In 2023, their operations in India were sold to Reliance Retail.

== Metro name ==
In 2012, in the face of an impending brand conflict, Microsoft renamed its Metro user interface of the Microsoft Windows 8 computer operating system (to Microsoft Design Language, or MDL).

== See also ==
- EuroCommerce
