= Alexandre Soares dos Santos =

Portuguese businessman (1935–2019)

Alexandre Soares dos Santos (23 September 1935 – 16 August 2019) was a Portuguese businessman. He led the Portuguese retailer Jerónimo Martins until November 2013, 45 years after taking over the company from his father.

== Biography ==
After Soares dos Santos graduated from the Colégio Almeida Garrett in his hometown of Porto, he studied law at the University of Lisbon, which he broke off. Soares dos Santos then worked for the Unilever Group where he came to Ireland and Germany. After he became marketing director in Brazil in 1968. In 1969 his father died, founder of the Jerónimo Martins Group. As a member of the Board of Director of his father's company he returned to Portugal. The group came largely intact through the economic turmoil after the Carnation Revolution in 1974. The business operates the Pingo Doce and Recheio chains in Portugal. It traces its roots to 1792, and the dos Santos family has controlled it since 1921.

The late 1980s, he brought the company to the stock exchange, acquired several other companies in the food industry (including Iglo and Feira Nova), and expanded to the UK, the Netherlands and especially to Poland, where Jerónimo Martins created its local brand Biedronka with over 2000 stores, today market leader in the food trade in Poland. After leading the Portuguese food retailer Jeronimo Martins for 45 years he stepped down in November 2013.

In 2009 Soares dos Santos founded the Fundação Francisco Manuel dos Santos, named after his father, which dedicates itself to equal opportunities, democracy and the civil society in Portugal. He was awarded the Order of Infante Dom Henrique in Grand Cross rank, of the Order of Merit in the Grand Cross rank and the Order of Entrepreneurial Merit.

Soares dos Santos was married to Maria Teresa Canas Mendes da Silveira e Castro since 1957. They have seven children, two of whom are already in bodies of corporate management. They also have 18 grandchildren (2012).

Soares dos Santos died on August 16, 2019.
