= Świtalski =

Świtalski (feminine: Świtalska) is a Polish family name. Notable people with the surname include:

- Jon Switalski, American politician
- Karol Świtalski (1902–1993), Polish Lutheran priest
- Kazimierz Świtalski (1886–1962), Polish politician
- Mariusz Świtalski (born 1962), Polish entrepreneur
- Michael Switalski (born 1955), American politician
- Piotr Świtalski (born 1957), Polish diplomat
