= Plus (German supermarket) =

Former German chain of discount supermarkets

Plus Warenhandelsgesellschaft mbH
- Type: GmbH
- Industry: Food retailing
- Founded: 1972
- Defunct: 2010
- Headquarters: Mülheim an der Ruhr, Germany
- Key people: Michael Hürter
- Revenue: € 10 bn (2006)
- Number of employees: 27,700 (2005)
- Website: plus-online.de (Archived, now redirects to netto-online24.de, which redirects to netto-online.de)

Plus (German pronunciation: [plʊs]) was a German multinational discount supermarket chain founded in 1972. It operated 2,840 stores in Germany with an approximate 27,000 employees and about 1,200 stores in several other European countries. The retail model was to sell low-cost groceries with no expense incurred for display or marketing of products. Groceries were stored in the shipping cartons they came in, rather than being stacked on shelves. In German advertising, the name "Plus" was used as a backronym for "Prima leben und sparen" (approximately "top-notch living and saving"), featuring animated "little prices" (also sold as plush puppets) as their mascot.

== Sale ==
The Edeka Group and the Tengelmann Group entered a joint venture to acquire the Plus supermarket chain on 16 November 2007, which resulted in 70% of Plus supermarkets being owned by the Edeka Group and 30% owned by the Tengelmann Group.

As of January 2009, the stores in the Plus supermarket chain owned by the Edeka group were remodelled into Netto Marken-Discount supermarket chain branches, while the Tengelmann Group's supermarkets were bought by others.

In 2008, Plus was recognized by PETA as the most pet-friendly discount store.

Country	First supermarket	Withdrawn	Number of supermarkets	Sold to
Cyprus	1973	2008	44	AlphaMega
Germany	1972	2007	2840	Netto Marken-Discount (Edeka) and 328 Penny Market (REWE)
Austria	2003	2010	355	
Spain	1994	2007	238	Dia
Portugal	2003	2007	75	Pingo Doce (Jerónimo Martins)
Poland	1995	2007	183	Biedronka (Jerónimo Martins)
Czech Republic	1992	2008	134	Penny Market (REWE)
Hungary	1992	2008	174	Spar
Romania	2005	2010	120	Lidl
Bulgaria	2009	2010	25	Lidl
Greece	2006	2008	33	AB Vassilopoulos (Delhaize)
United States	1979	1982	21	A&P
