= Mariusz Świtalski =

Polish entrepreneur (born 1962)

- Born: May 19, 1962 (age 64); Poland
- Occupation: Entrepreneur
- Known for: Founder of Elektromis, Eurocash, Biedronka, Żabka, and Małpka Express and one of the richest people on Poland

Mariusz Świtalski (born 19 May 1962) is a Polish entrepreneur. He is the founder of Elektromis, Eurocash, Biedronka, Żabka, and Małpka Express and has been named one of the richest people in Poland by Wprost weekly.

== Early life ==
He grew up in various orphanages, the longest in a house run by nuns in Szamotuły. He graduated from a 2-year vocational school in plumbing.

== Career ==
In the 80s he traded at the Poznań trade fair, at the end of the 1980s he specialized in coffee making and then in computer hardware distribution.

In 1987, he founded Elektromis, an enterprise importing confectionery, radio and television equipment, beer and spirits. Within 2 years, it transformed into a huge holding. Some of his companies back then were registered and run by his friends from the orphanages. In 1992, Elektromis owned 50 warehouses throughout Poland and PLN 168 million in profit per year. An investigation was launched on a 1992 referral from the Ministry of Finance, which suspected Elektromis of tax fraud, illegal alcohol trade, theft, and fake sales transactions. According to prosecutors, Elektromis’ illegal practices cost the Polish state at least USD 25 million.

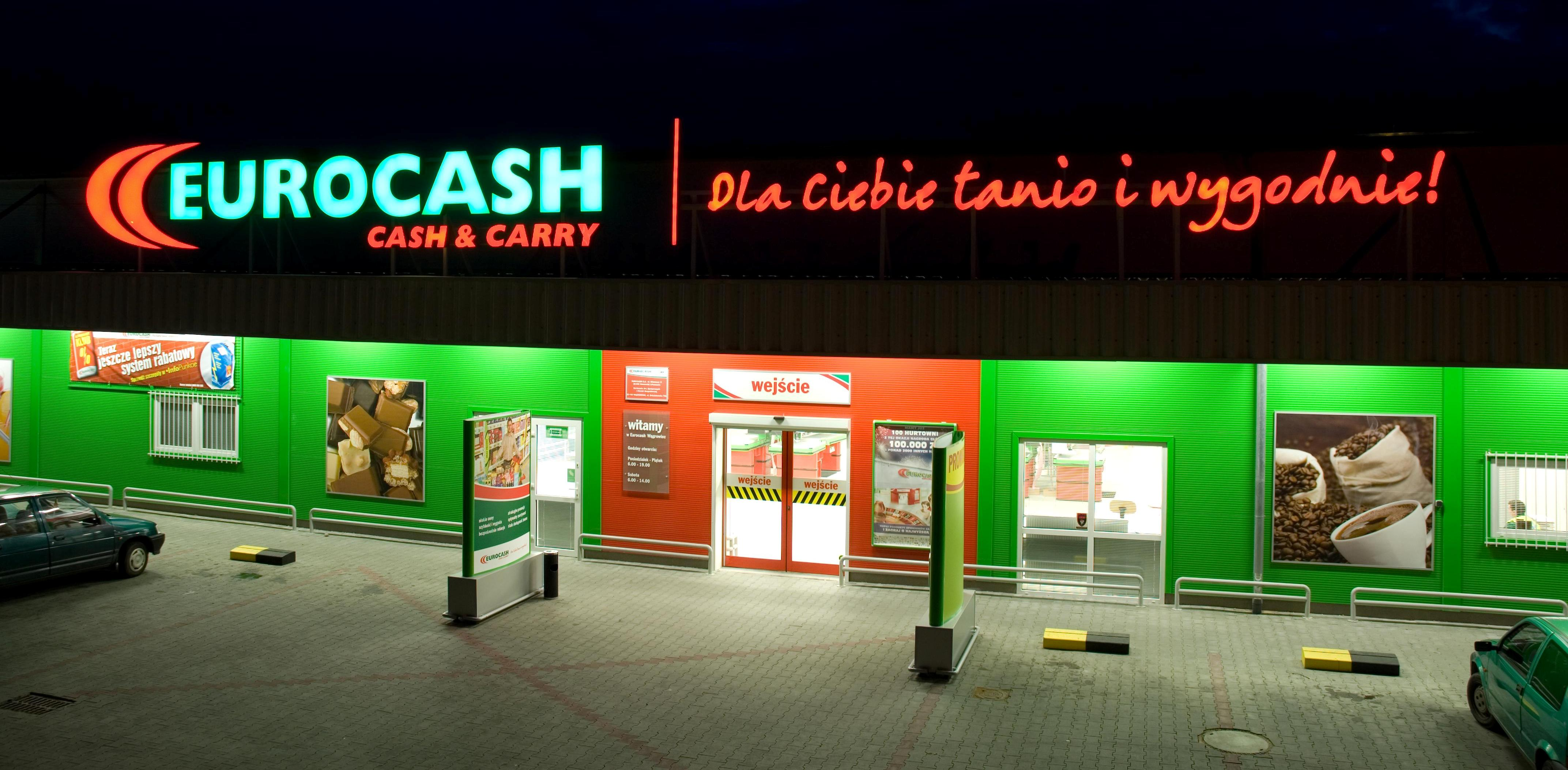
A Eurocash wholesale location

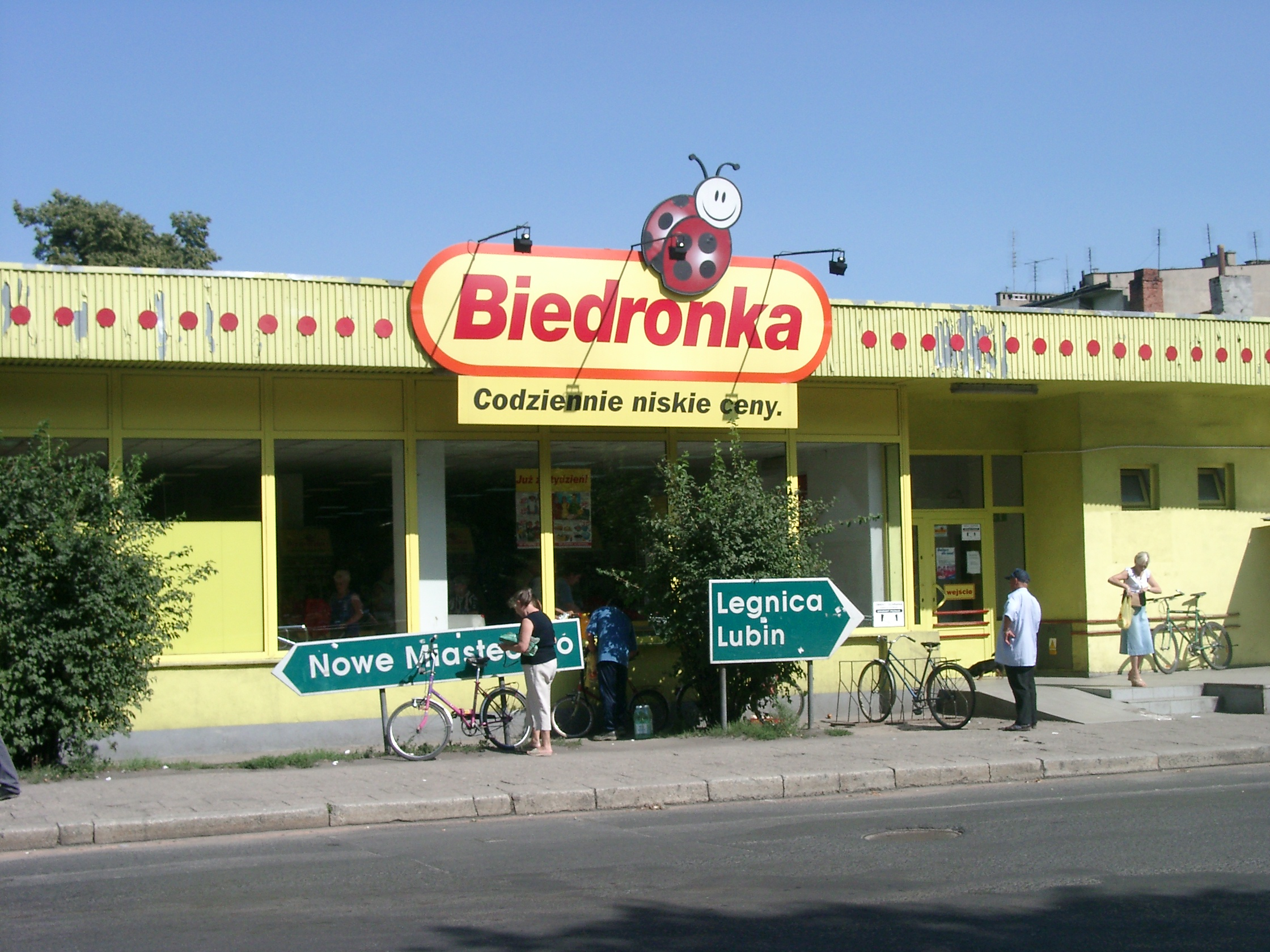
A Biedronka discount supermarket

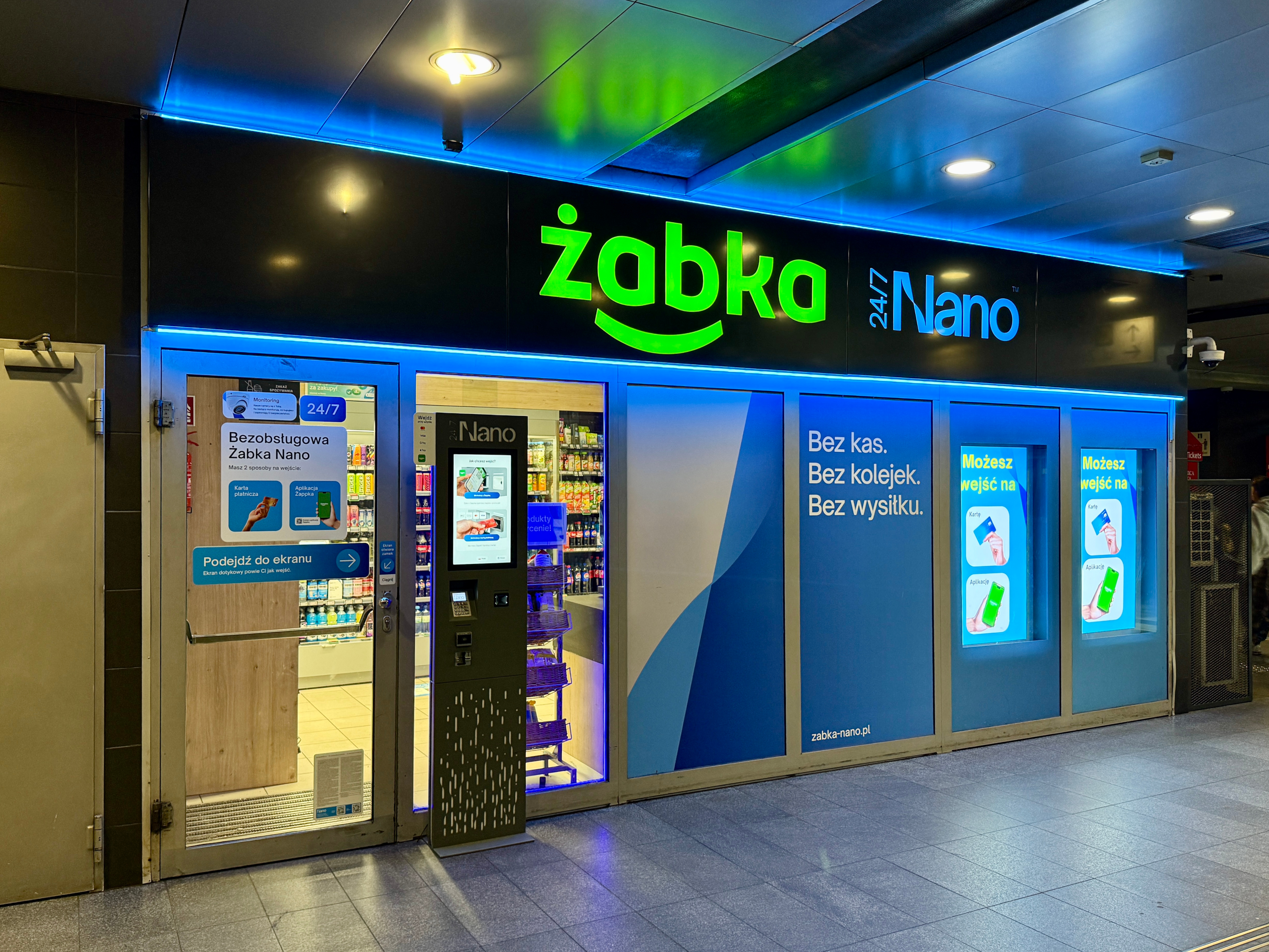
Żabka Nano convenience store in Warsaw

In 1993, he transformed Elektromis into Eurocash, which became the largest grocery wholesale chain in Poland. In 1995 he sold it to Jerónimo Martins. In 1995, he founded the discount chain Biedronka, which he sold (243 branches) in 1998 also to Jerónimo Martins. Another investigation was launched in 1994 and lasted until the early 2000s, resulting in 13 indictments. Świtalski was never a witness in the case as he had not been formally employed as an Elektromis executive.

He was the owner of the weekly Miliarder. He helped Jerzy Urban in setting up the weekly "Nie". He founded the Posnania bank, which, however, in 1995 closed down.

In 1998, he founded Żabka, whose shares in 2000 were bought by the AIG fund.

In 2011, he launched the "Sowiniec FIZ" fund investing in real estate. It owns the land between Puszczykowo near Poznań and Sowiniec. At the end of the 1990s, he also bought plots in Poznań, in the Naramowice housing estate.

In December 2010, the Poznań-based company Świtalski & Synowie changed its name to Czerwona Torebka SA. In 2012 Czerwona Torebka went public on the Warsaw Stock Exchange. In 2019 WSE decided to suspend Czerwona Torebka shares from trading.

In 2013, he created the discount chain store Czerwony Torebka. In April 2015, the management of the company Dyskont Czerwona Torebka SA decided to liquidate the company. In July of the same year, all stores were closed, and the company Czerwona Torebka ceased to exist.

In February 2020, Świtalski's assets were frozen by a court order issued in a legal dispute between Świtalski and Forteam Investments fund. The dispute concerns the sale of the Małpka chain, which Forteam bought from a subsidiary of Świtalski in 2015 An agreement supporting the sale guaranteed the buyer a minimum price in case of subsequent sale of Małpka to a third party. The claims against Świtalski exceed PLN 300 million (EUR 80m). In May 2020 the injunction was extended to Mariusz Switalski's children. In July 2020, Forteam was granted an injunction against Druga-Sowiniec Capital sp. z o.o. S.K.A., a company controlled by Mariusz Świtalski, and Krzysztof Belcarz. As a result, Forteam secured 45.94% of Czerwona Torebka shares. In total, Forteam has secured 48.44% of the Czerwona Torebka shares. In October 2020, the court issued the fourth injunction in favour of Forteam. The court’s decision seized all Świtalski FIZ certificates and shares of the Druga – Sowiniec Capital sp. z o. o. sp. k. company owning, among others, a palace in Sowiniec valued at EUR 50 million in 2015.

== Personal life ==
As of 2015, he was the 40th richest person in Poland as named by Wprost and had an estimated 1.3 billion Polish złoty by 2023.
