= Pordata =

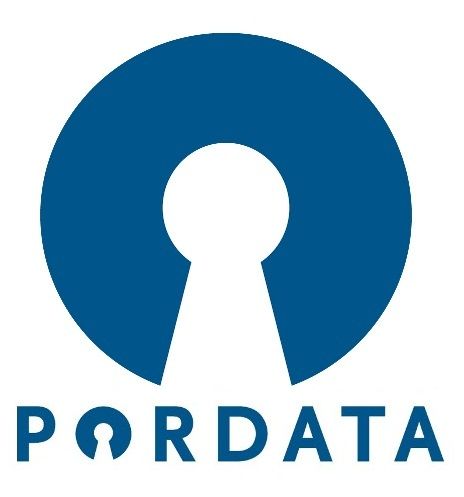
PORDATA is an initiative of the Francisco Manuel dos Santos Foundation - FFMS

Pordata is the Contemporary Portugal Database equipped with official and certified statistics about Portugal and Europe. The information is divided in several themes like population, education, health, among others. This database is available for everybody, free of charge, and complete with exempt and accurate information. All of its information is provided by official entities, such as the Portuguese National Institute of Statistics and Eurostat. The number of sources being used so far goes up to a total of 60. All of the available data is presented in a yearly fashion, and whenever possible dating back to 1960.

Pordata was organized by the Francisco Manuel dos Santos Foundation, created in 2009 by Alexandre Soares dos Santos and his family. FFMS, is presided by Professor António Barreto and set its main objective in promoting study, knowledge, information and public debate.

When released to the public on February 23, 2010 under the direction of Prof. Maria João Valente Rosa, Pordata included only contents about Portugal, nationally. On November 3, the Foundation, launches an extension of its database to the new Pordata Europe. It now includes not only data about Portugal, but also about the European Union, Schengen Area, United States and Japan.

== About Pordata ==
Created by the Francisco Manuel dos Santos Foundation (FFMS) on February 23, 2010, Contemporary Portugal Database Pordata is a public service, free of charge of unlimited use.

Pordata allows the user a fast access to the numbers of the Portuguese reality, spread out across different themes as diverse as population, justice, education, health, environment, among several others. All presented in a chronologic evolution starting, whenever possible in 1960. About 40 official sources in Pordata Portugal, and more than 20 in Pordata Europe are responsible for the rigorous and exempt treatment of the published numbers.

With more than 70.000 series available, Pordata allows the analysis of different themes in the same search enviorement. Here, the user is able to use a vast set of both visualization tools (such as graphs and tables) and editing ones (%, variations, etc.).

Directed by Professor Maria João Valente Rosa, the project Pordata is the result of a sequence of studies coordinated and put to motion by António Barreto in the Social Sciences Institute of Lisbon University dating back to the late 90s. FFMS believes that side by side with the rapid development of information and communication technologies, the general interest in statistics as suffered a significant growth in the last few years, putting it in a vital position inside the process of analyzing and knowing nowadays societies.

According to Maria João Valente Rosa, Pordata “is trying to answer the needs of credible information, so many times disperse and with complex access, to a public as wider as possible”. Furthermore: “This is a project destined to everybody, a real public service, thought out to a vast number of users that share in the interest of a deeper knowledge about Portugal, with trust, rigor and easy access.”.

After its original release Pordata had a second development stage, with the new European database. New themes and different approaches are scheduled to complete the already existing ones, such as the database expansion to the Portuguese regions and municipalities.

== Pordata Europe ==
On November 3, 2010, FFMS released to the general public a new database, with the same characteristics, still inside the Pordata environment. The new database includes not only data about Portugal itself, as it did so far, but also allows access to new data about all the countries in the European Union and the Schengen Area. Also, in several tables, the user can find series about both the United States and Japan.

Now it is possible to compare the evolution of different indicators not only about Portugal but from all around Europe as well. All of the editing and visualization tools are the same as before. This way, the software not only allows the Portuguese users to an easier and faster method of their national data analysis, as long as the information crosscheck with its European framing, but it also enables other users to search for information about their own countries.

== Pordata’s Structure ==
In Pordata Portugal’s database the following themes are available: Population, Health, Education, Social Protection, Employment and Labour Market, Enterprises and Personnel, Family Income and Expenditure, Housing and Comfort, Justice, Culture, National Accounts, Government Accounts, Science and Technology and Environment, Energy and Territory. In Pordata Europe, the available themes are: Population, Health, Education, Social Protection, Employment and Labour Market, National Accounts, Enterprises and Personnel, Environment, Energy and Territory, Science and Technology and Housing, Family Income and Expenditure.

Also available in Pordata’s website are the following contents:

Counters: real-time simulations based on series of official statistics, which are also available in Pordata.

Indicators: highlight of five relevant indicators about Portugal.

Summary Table: table data on the most important development indicators regarding Portuguese society from 1960 to 2001. These are the years that population censuses took place in the country.

Glossary: glossary with the definitions for all the concepts used in Pordata.

Europe’s Map: interactive map where the user can get fast access to some information about the different European countries (such as capitals, Areas, population e GDP). It also allows the identification of the countries that belong to the European Union, Euro Zone or even the Schengen Area, by a simple click on the groups identified on the chart.

== Pordata and FFMS ==
To Alexandre Soares dos Santos, main booster and Chairman of the Foundation’s, Board of Trustees “this project is the single central objective of FFMS, it goes through the promotion of studies, knowledge, information and public debate of the great themes of Portuguese society, seeking to contribute to the development of our country, the improvement of public institutions and the strengthening of the rights of every citizen”.

António Barreto, Chairman of the Foundation’s Board of Directors, also considers that Pordata is the best answer to the priorities set for FFMS “by devoting a substantial part of its resources and its efforts to the collection, compilation and dissemination of information about Portugal and the Portuguese, while respecting the criteria for exemption, independence and rigor”.

== Awards ==
Exame Informática magazine highlighted the project Pordata as the best of 2010 in the Internet category. According to Exame Informática "the project of the Francisco Manuel dos Santos Foundation is imperative to know what it was, what it is, and how it is changing our Portugal. An inspiring project, no doubt."
