= 2012 rush to Pingo Doce =

- Location: Pingo Doce, Portugal
- Date: 1 May 2012
- Injuries: At least 2 injured (hospitalised)
- Motive: Rush to the stores after drastic discount campaign

On 1 May 2012, as a result of a campaign that guaranteed a 50% discount for clients who purchased more than €100 in products, there was a rush to the Pingo Doce chain of hypermarkets, on the 369 stores all over Portugal.

This sale resulted in an abnormal flow of vehicles and shoppers to the stores, and the Polícia de Segurança Pública (Police for Public Security) registered more than fifty incidents, among them civil disorder and assaults, more than half having taken place in the Lisbon region. A row between two shoppers in a store in Senhora da Hora resulted in two people being injured and subsequently hospitalised in Porto. Multiple other assaults between customers in Lisbon, Amadora, Cacem and Loures were reported.

The Jerónimo Martins Group, who owns the Pingo Doce chain of hypermarkets, denied accusations of dumping after the media attention. The Autoridade de Segurança Alimentar e Económica (Authority for Alimentary and Economic Safety) commenced an investigation into alleged infractions that may have taken place during the sale. The matter was also debated in the Portuguese Parliament, where the parliamentary left accused the Jerónimo Martins Group of illegal practices: Catarina Martins, Member of Parliament for the Left Bloc, accused Jerónimo Martins of "crushing" the competition by "taking advantage of the poor economic situation of the Portuguese people". Agostinho Lopes, Member of Parliament for the Portuguese Communist Party, has pointed out that the sale was "yet another act of prepotence by a major sales group", adding that "it's them who run the government now, apparently."

Many people who witnessed the incidents published videos on the internet, via sites like YouTube, that showed huge numbers of people crowding the stores, along with empty shelves.
