= Elektromis =

- Founded: 1987
- Founder: Mariusz Świtalski

Elektromis was a Poznań wholesale-trade holding company, sold in 1995 to Jerónimo Martins.

The company was founded in 1987 by Mariusz Świtalski. In 1990 it opened its first warehouses. Within a couple of years, Elektromis became the largest wholesaler in Poland.

Between 1994-2002, Elektromis faced legal action relating to customs fraud and illegal trading, which ultimately resulted in the conviction of four of the thirteen defendants.
