= Radomsko =

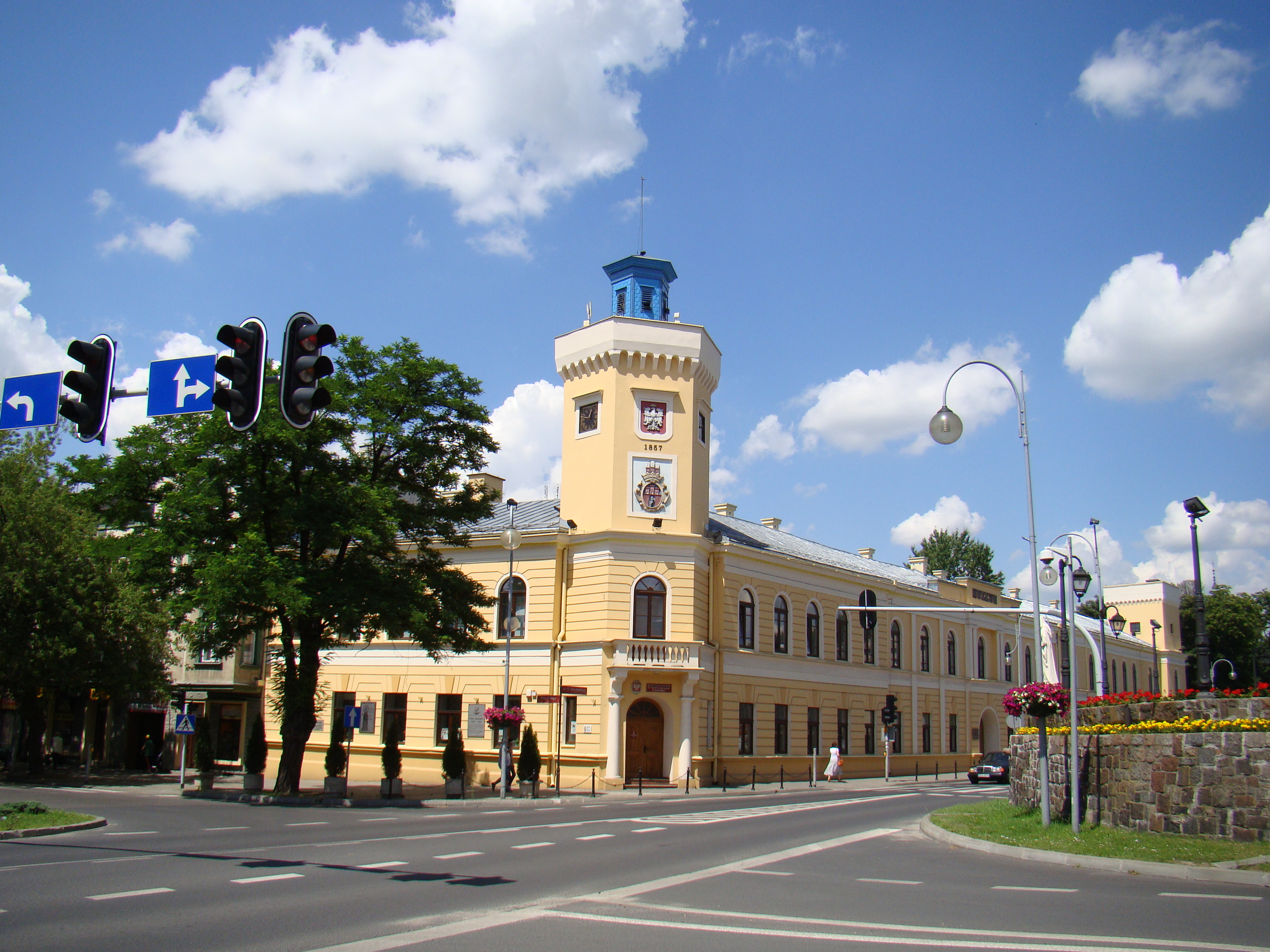
- City Museum in the historic Ratusz

- Flag Coat of arms

- Location within Poland
- Coordinates: 51°4′N 19°27′E
- Country: Poland
- Voivodeship: Łódź
- County: Radomsko
- Gmina: Radomsko (urban gmina)
- Established: 11th century
- First mentioned: 1243
- City rights: 1266

Government
  - City Mayor: Jarosław Ferenc

Area
  - Total: 62.01 km^{2} (23.94 sq mi)
- Highest elevation: 254 m (833 ft)
- Lowest elevation: 220 m (720 ft)

Population (31 December 2021)
  - Total: 44,700 ▼
  - Density: 721/km^{2} (1,870/sq mi)
- Time zone: UTC+1 (CET)
  - Summer (DST): UTC+2 (CEST)
- Postal code: 97-500
- Vehicle registration: ERA
- Website: http://www.radomsko.pl

Radomsko (pronounced [raˈdɔmskɔ]) is a city in south-central Poland with 44,700 inhabitants (2021). It is situated on the Radomka river in the Łódź Voivodeship. It is the county seat of Radomsko County.

Founded in the 11th century, Radomsko is a former royal city located within the Sieradz Land, which prospered as a trade center due to its location at the intersection of important trade routes. In the 14th century, it was the site of congresses at which Princess Jadwiga of Poland was chosen as King of Poland as the country's first female monarch. Due to particularly strong partisan resistance against German occupiers during World War II, it was dubbed Banditenstadt ("City of Bandits") by the Germans.

It is located on the main railway line connecting Warsaw and Katowice, the country's two largest metropolitan areas, and on the main highway connecting Gdańsk and Łódź with Katowice, part of the European route E75.

== History ==
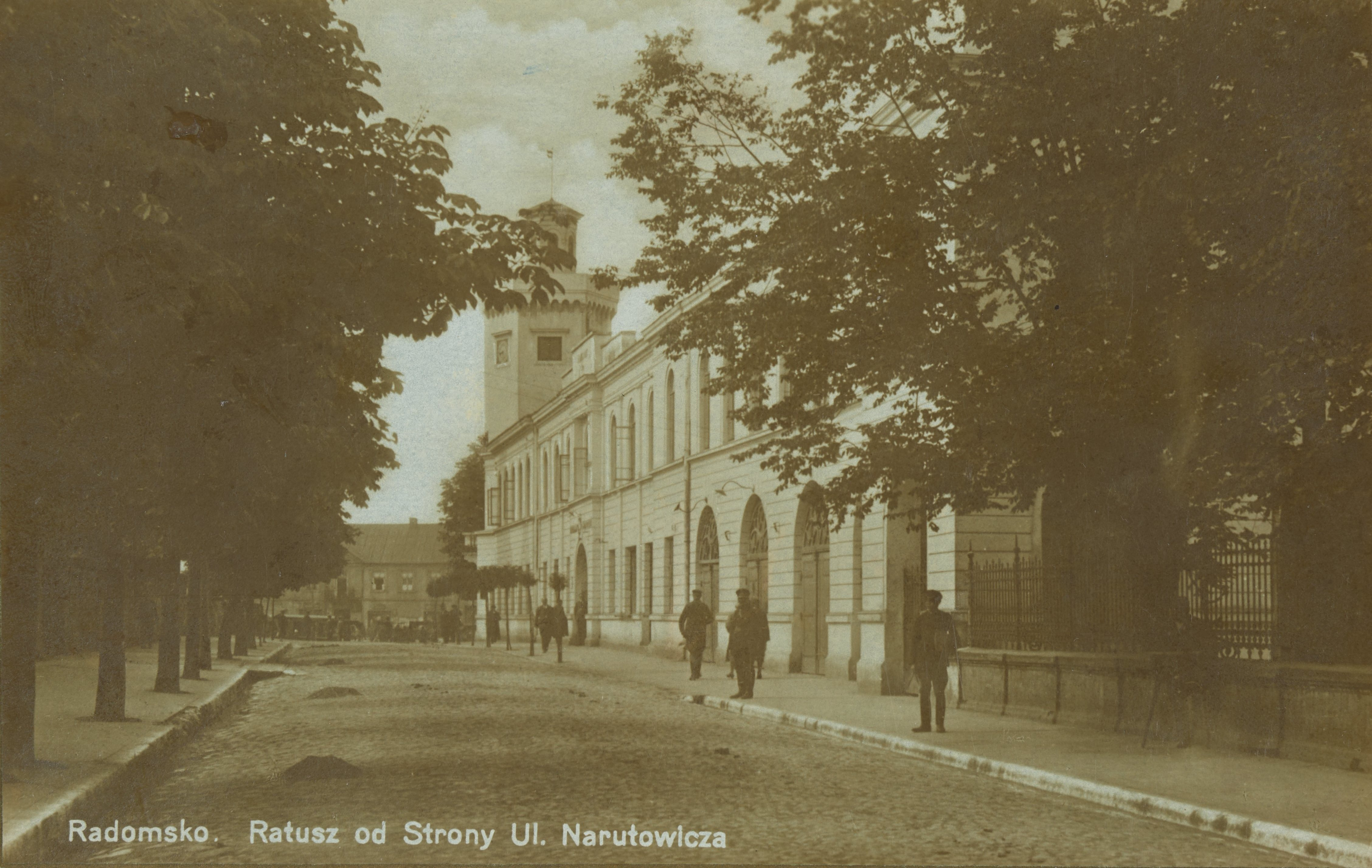
Town Hall in 1931

Radomsko dates back to the 11th century. The oldest known mention of Radomsko comes from a document of Konrad I of Masovia from 1243. It received town privileges from Duke Leszek II the Black of Sieradz in 1266. During the times of fragmentation of Piast-ruled Poland, it was part of the Seniorate Province and Duchy of Sieradz, and afterwards it was a county seat and royal town of the Kingdom of Poland, administratively located in the Sieradz Voivodeship in the Greater Poland Province. In 1288, Duke Leszek II the Black brought Franciscans to the town, and in 1328, King Ladislaus the Short funded the construction of the Gothic Franciscan church.

In 1382 and 1384, congresses of Polish nobility were held in Radomsko, during which Princess Jadwiga of Poland was chosen as Queen of Poland as the country's first female monarch. It was probably Radomsko where an agreement was concluded under which the future king of Poland Władysław II Jagiełło married Jadwiga, hence founding the Jagiellonian dynasty. Nowadays, Queen Jadwiga is considered the patron saint of Radomsko. The town developed under the patronage of the Jagiellonian dynasty, and was granted important trade and tax privileges by Kings Władysław II Jagiełło in 1427 and Sigismund II Augustus in 1549 and 1552.

In 1793 as a consequence of the Second Partition of Poland the town became part of the Kingdom of Prussia. In 1807 it became part of the Polish Duchy of Warsaw, then in 1815 part of Congress Poland within the Russian Empire. In 1846 the section of the Warsaw–Vienna railway that ran through the town opened, providing a railway connection to Warsaw. Inhabitants took part in the November and January uprisings against Russia. One of the first battles of the Polish January Uprising in the region took place in Radomsko on January 24, 1863. Further clashes between Polish insurgents and Russian troops took place in Radomsko on March 14 and June 24, 1863. After the fall of the January Uprising, anti-Polish repressions, including Russification policies, intensified. The Russian administration expelled Franciscan monks from the town.

During World War I, the town was occupied by Austria. On 7 November 1918, local inhabitants and members of the secret Polish Military Organisation disarmed the Austrians and liberated the town, four days before Poland officially regained independence. Polish political prisoners were then released. The Franciscans came back to their monastery in 1918.

=== World War II ===
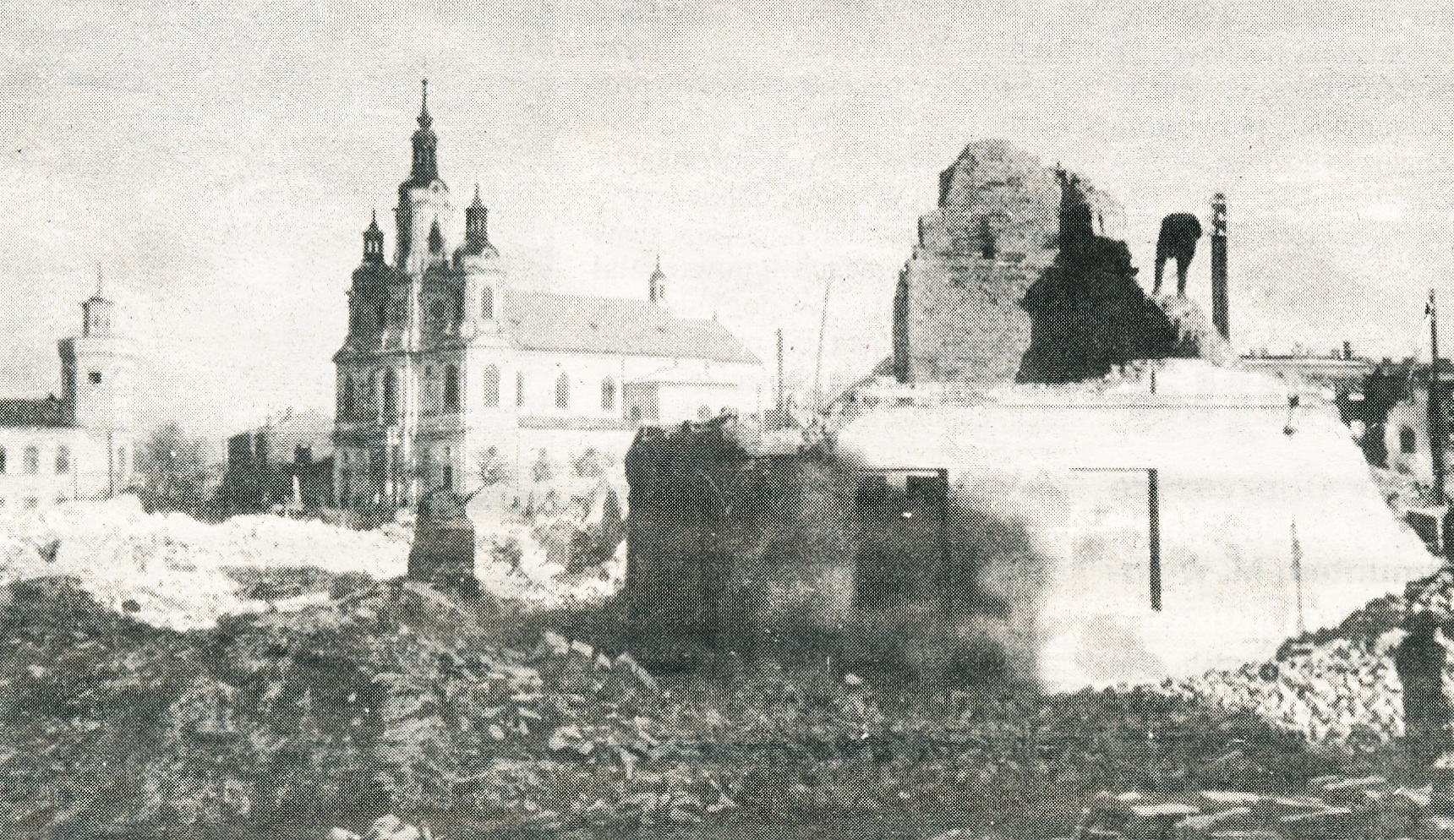
Destruction after the German bombing of the town in 1939

On 1 September 1939, the first day of the German invasion of Poland that started World War II, the Germans air raided the town. Dozens of civilians were killed in the bombings. Radomsko was taken over by the Wehrmacht on 3 September 1939. The next day, the Germans carried out executions of Poles in the present-day districts of Bartodzieje, Folwarki and Stobiecko Miejskie. On 6–8 September 1939, the Einsatzgruppe II entered the town, and then carried out mass arrests of Poles, and searched Polish offices and organizations. Polish underground resistance was organized already in October 1939. There was also secret Polish schooling, and the underground University of the Western Lands gave secret lectures.

In March 1940, the Germans carried out mass arrests of 60 Poles in the town and county. In April 1940 a Nazi ghetto was set up in the Przedborze district for local Polish Jews. Over 120 Poles from Radomsko and the area were murdered by the Russians in the large Katyn massacre in April–May 1940. During the German AB-Aktion, 53 Polish teachers and school principals were arrested on 11 June 1940, and further mass arrests of Poles were carried out in August 1940 and in 1941. The victims were interrogated by the Gestapo, deported to concentration camps or murdered in the forests near Olsztyn during large massacres carried out in June, July and October 1940 or in the Kopiec district and nearby villages. In September 1942, the German Kreishauptmann (district administrator) issued a document stating that Poles in the city and county were hiding Jews who had escaped from the ghetto, and reminded of the death penalty imposed on Poles for giving shelter to Jews or supplying them with food. The ghetto was liquidated in two stages during the Holocaust. The first deportation action took place in early October 1942 with prisoners sent aboard freight trains to the Treblinka extermination camp. On 12 October, approximately 9,000 Jews were deported. A small group of Jewish slave laborers was allowed to stay. They were sent to Treblinka in January 1943. Radomsko was declared Judenfrei. In retaliation, the unit of Armia Krajowa ambushed and shot the Chief of Gestapo Willy Berger and his deputy Johann Wagner on 27 May 1943. The German pacification action took place on 3 August 1943 in Rejowice. The settlement was levelled; some AK soldiers were captured and brought to Radomsko. The Nazi prison in Radomsko, located at the historic Ratusz, was attacked by AK on the night of 7–8 August 1943; and the prisoners were rescued. The attack was led by Porucznik Stanisław "Zbigniew" Sojczyński. There are multiple known cases of local Poles, who were persecuted by the Germans for rescuing Jews.

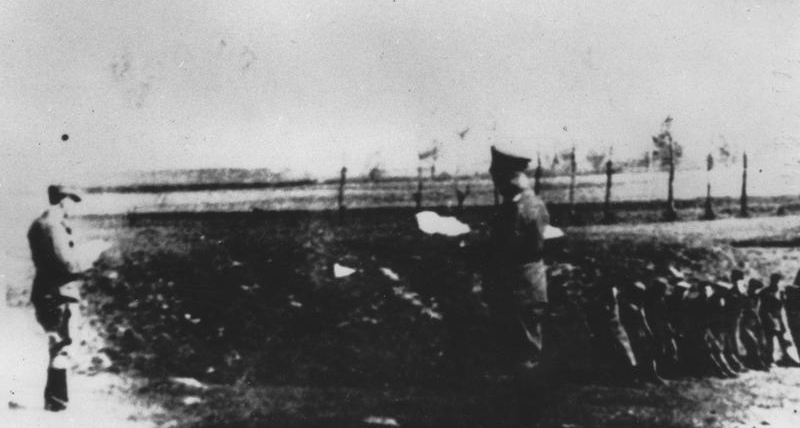
German execution of Poles in Radomsko in 1943

To eliminate the "Polish bandits" in the vicinity of Radomsko, some 1,000 SS and Wehrmacht soldiers were called in by the German administration. The battle was fought on 1 June 1944 near Krzętów, against about 80 AK partisans led by Florian "Andrzej" Budniak. The German army, unfamiliar with the local forest, lost 250 men and retreated. The second battle was launched on 12 September 1944 near Ewina. It was one of the biggest battles of the Polish underground in World War II, fought for several hours. The 3rd Brigade of Armia Ludowa (PAL) with 600 partisans, stood against the German force ten times larger. The losses of the enemy were estimated at 100 killed and 200 wounded. The Polish losses amounted to 12 killed partisans, 11 wounded, and several missing. The battles earned Radomsko the Nazi German nickname of 'Banditenstadt', meaning 'the City of Bandits'.

In 1944, during and following the Warsaw Uprising, the Germans carried out deportations of Varsovians from the Dulag 121 camp in Pruszków, where they were initially imprisoned, to Radomsko. Those Poles were mainly old people, ill people and women with children. In 1945, the German occupation ended and the town was restored to Poland, although with a Soviet-installed communist regime, which then stayed in power until the Fall of Communism in the 1980s.

=== Post-war period ===
In April 1946, 167 partisans of the Underground Polish Army attacked a communist prison and liberated over 50 prisoners. In the following weeks, the communists increased repressions and arrested about 150 people associated with the resistance movement. In May 1946, the communists sentenced 17 participants of the action from April 1946, including 12 to death. Those sentenced to death were brutally murdered, and then their bodies were thrown into a well near the Pilica river.

The Culture Center and the Regional Museum were opened in 1967 and 1969, respectively. From 1975 to 1998, Radomsko was located in the Piotrków Voivodeship. In December 1981, the communists imprisoned eight local Solidarity members. The local people gathered and tried to stop the transport of the arrested activists, however, they were still interned by the communists in Sieradz and then Łowicz.

== Transport ==
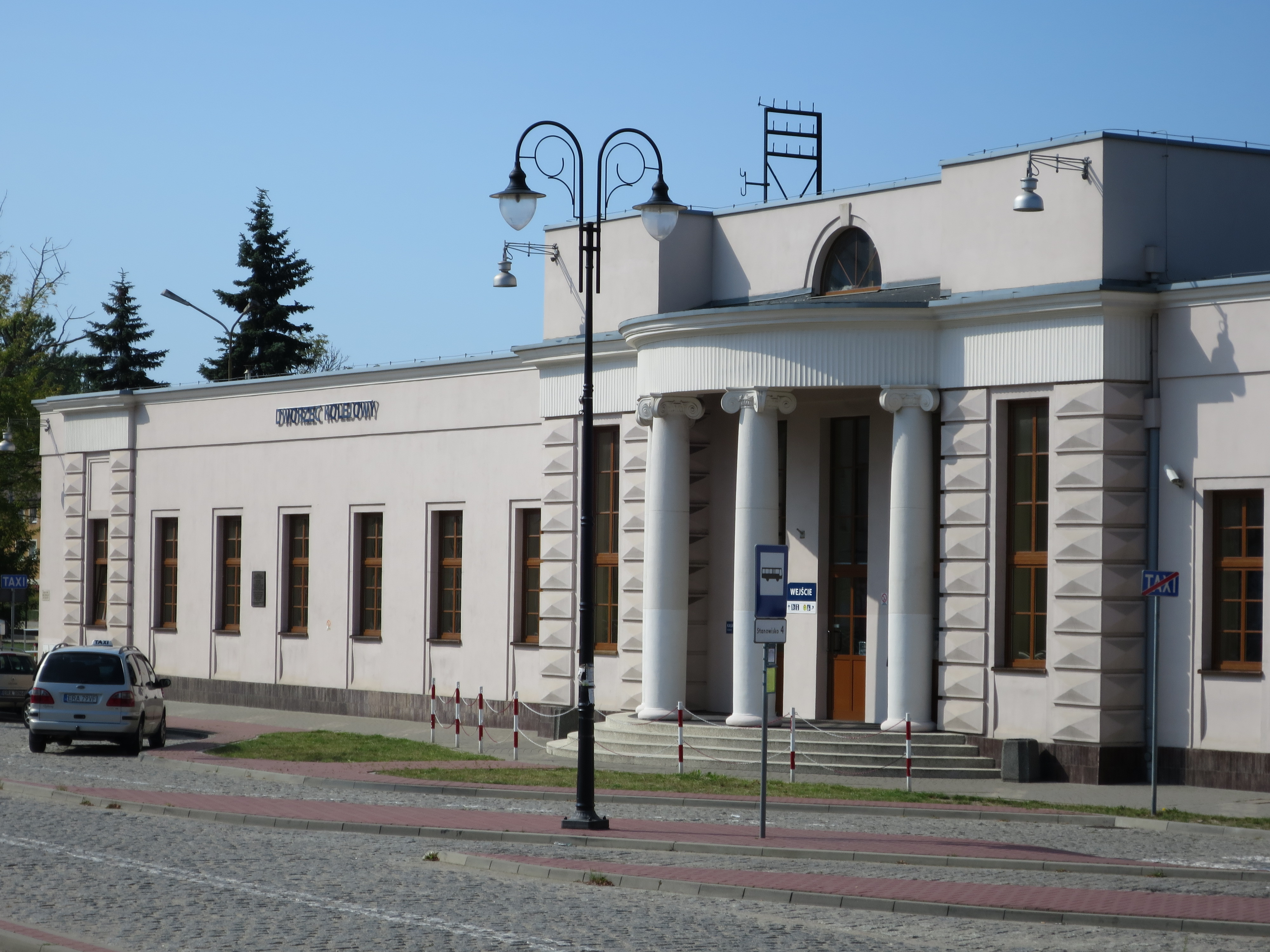
Railway station

The Polish Railway line 1, which connects Warsaw and Katowice, the country's two largest metropolitan areas, runs through the town. Polish State Railways (PKP) provide Radomsko with connections with various cities throughout Poland, including Łódź, Częstochowa, Sosnowiec, Gliwice, Wrocław, Toruń, Bydgoszcz, Gdańsk, Gdynia, Białystok, Olsztyn and Lublin.

The town can also be reached by the Polish National road 1, the A1 autostrada (highway), which connects the largest Polish port city of Gdańsk in the north with the Katowice urban area and the Czech Republic–Poland border at Gorzyczki in the south. The town is also located on the Polish National roads 42 and 91, and the European route E75, which connects northern Norway and Finland with Greece.

== Cuisine ==
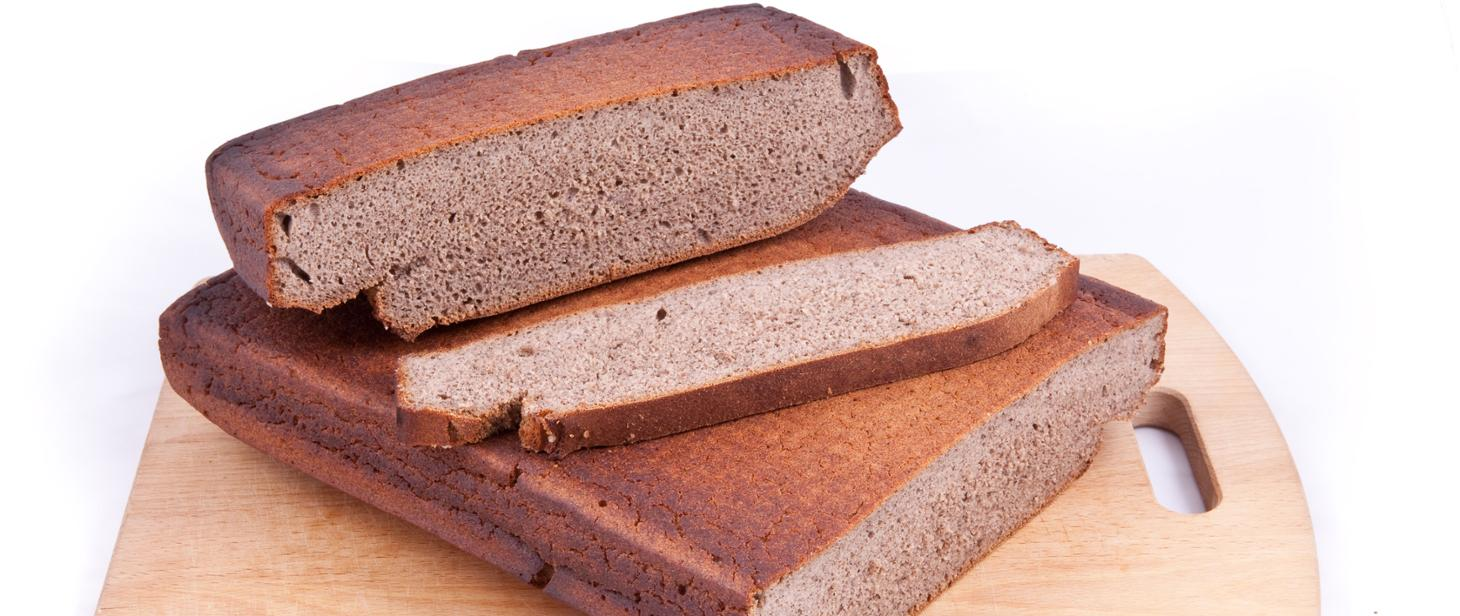
Tatarczuch from Radomsko, a traditional local sweet brown bread

The officially protected traditional foods originating from Radomsko are radomszczańska zalewajka and tatarczuch of Radomsko (as designated by the Ministry of Agriculture and Rural Development of Poland). Radomszczańska zalewajka is a distinct type of zalewajka, a traditional Polish soup made of diced and boiled potatoes, sour rye (żur) made of sourdough bread, and słonina with skwarki. It differs from other types by the use of dried mushrooms and local smetana. Tatarczuch is a sweet, honey-tasting brown bread made of buckwheat flour.

== Sports ==
RKS Radomsko football club was founded in 1979. It competes in the lower leagues, although in the past it played in the Poland's top division.

Heritage architecture (examples):

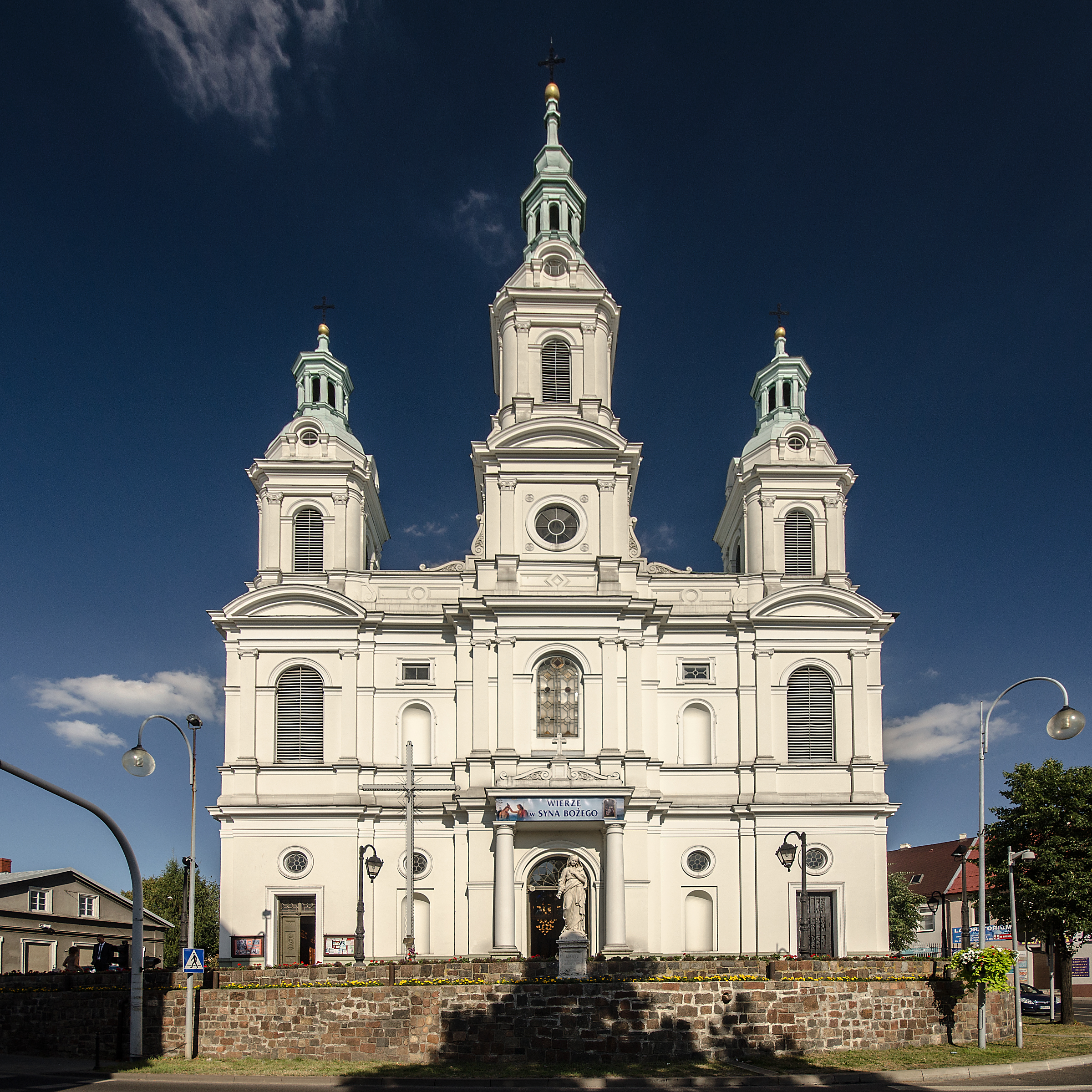
Saint Lambertus church

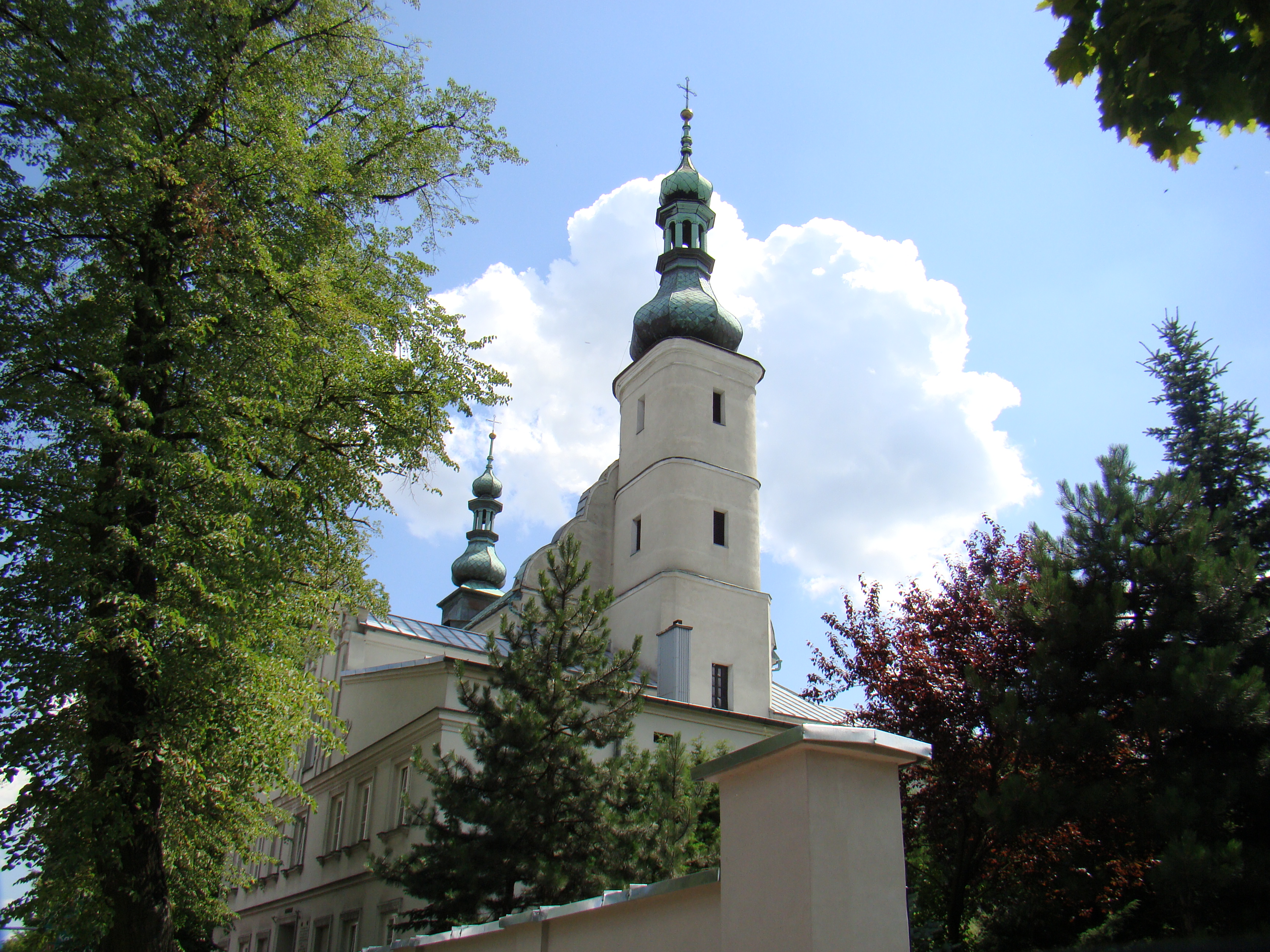
Exaltation of the Holy Cross church and Franciscan monastery

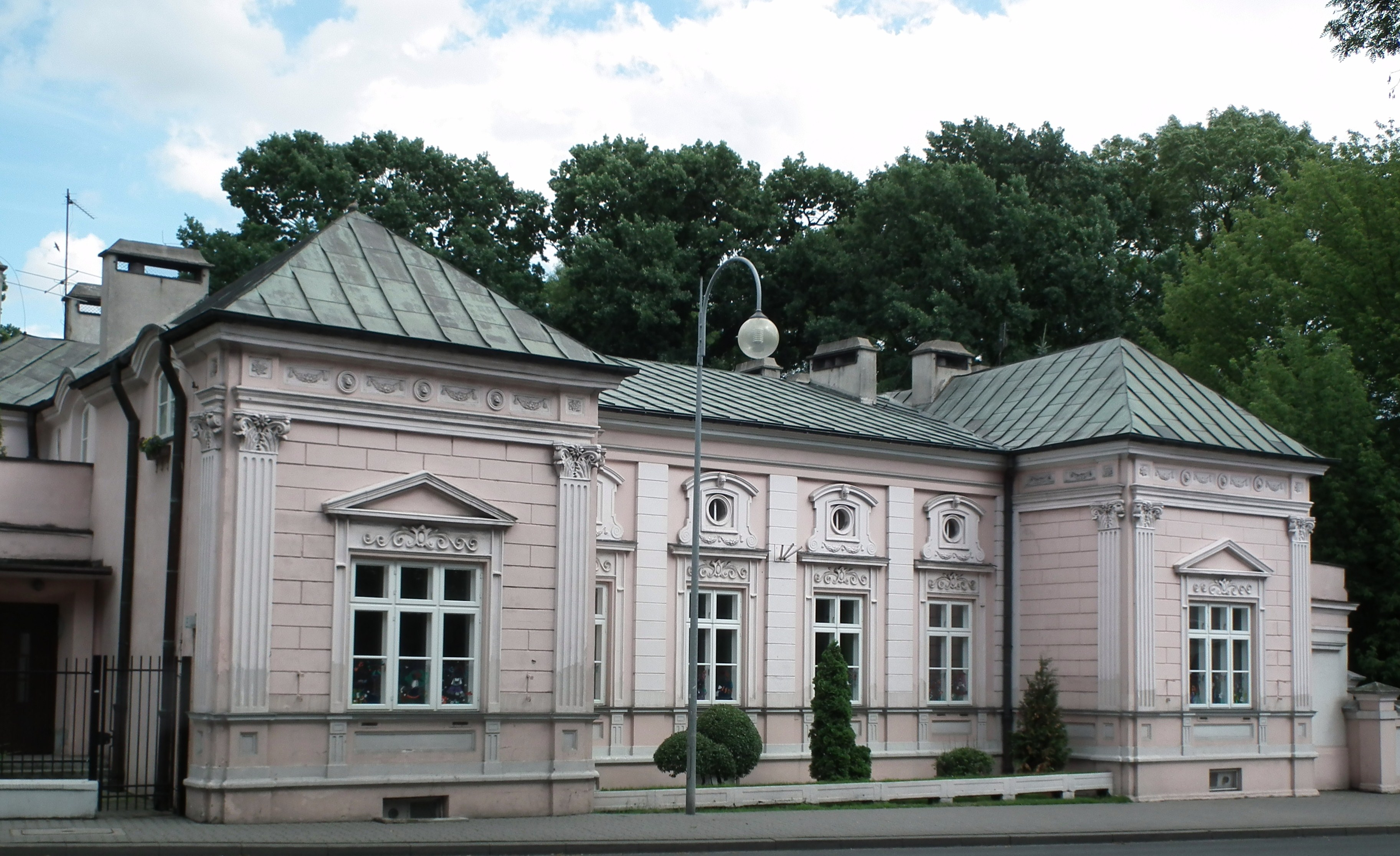
Municipal library

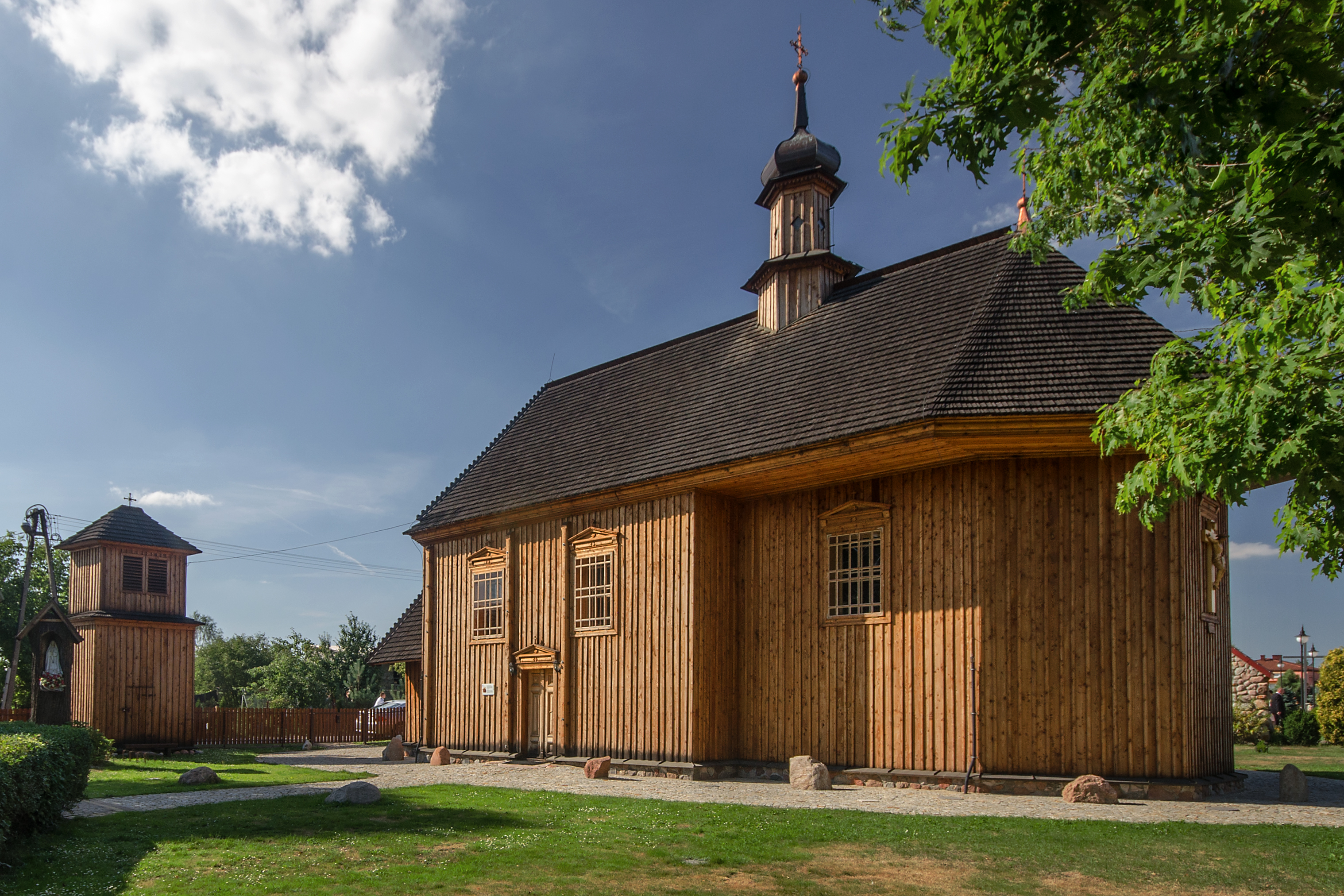
Saint Roch church

== Twin towns – sister cities ==
Radomsko is twinned with:

- Makó, Hungary
- Lincoln, United Kingdom
- Voznesensk, Ukraine
- Kiryat Bialik, Israel

== Notable people ==
- Jan Benigier (born 1950) former footballer, member of the Poland national football team
- Stefan Brzózka (1931–2023) Polish chess player, International Correspondence Chess Grandmaster
- Mariusz Czerkawski (born 1972) ice hockey player
- Zbigniew Dłubak (1921–2005) artist, painter, photographer, art theoretician, prisoner of the Mauthausen-Gusen concentration camp during World War II
- José Ber Gelbard (1917–1977) born in Radomsko; emigrated in 1930 with his family to Argentina; a communist; appointed as an advisor by Juan Perón; served as an Economic Minister in every government until the military coup of 1976
- Zbigniew Gniatkowski (born 1972) diplomat, former ambassador of Poland to New Zealand
- Janusz Łęski (1930–2022) film director, screenwriter
- Sławomir Majak (born 1969) football manager, former footballer, member of the Poland national football team
- Anna Milczanowska (born 1958) Polish politician, parliamentarian, former mayor of Radomsko
- Avraham Yissachar Dov Hakohen Rabinowicz of Radomsk (Chesed LeAvraham) (1843–1892), second Radomsker Rebbe
- Shlomo Chanoch Hakohen Rabinowicz of Radomsk (1882–1942) fourth Radomsker Rebbe
- Shlomo Hakohen Rabinowicz of Radomsk (Tiferes Shlomo) (1801–1866) first Radomsker Rebbe
- Yechezkel Hakohen Rabinowicz of Radomsk (Kenesses Yechezkel) (1862–1910) third Radomsker Rebbe
- Władysław Reymont (1867–1925) novelist, Nobel laureate
- Stanisław Różewicz (1924–2008) Polish film director, screenwriter
- Tadeusz Różewicz (1921–2014) poet, Golden Wreath laureate.
- Jerzy Sadek (1942–2015) footballer, member of the Poland national football team
- Jerzy Semkow (1928–2014) Polish conductor
- Cezary Stefańczyk (born 1984) Polish footballer
- Piotr Stępień (born 1963) Polish former Olympic wrestler, silver medalist of the 1992 Summer Olympics
- Karol Świtalski (1902–1993) Polish Lutheran pastor, military chaplain
