= Zalewajka =

Soup made of potatoes and sour rye

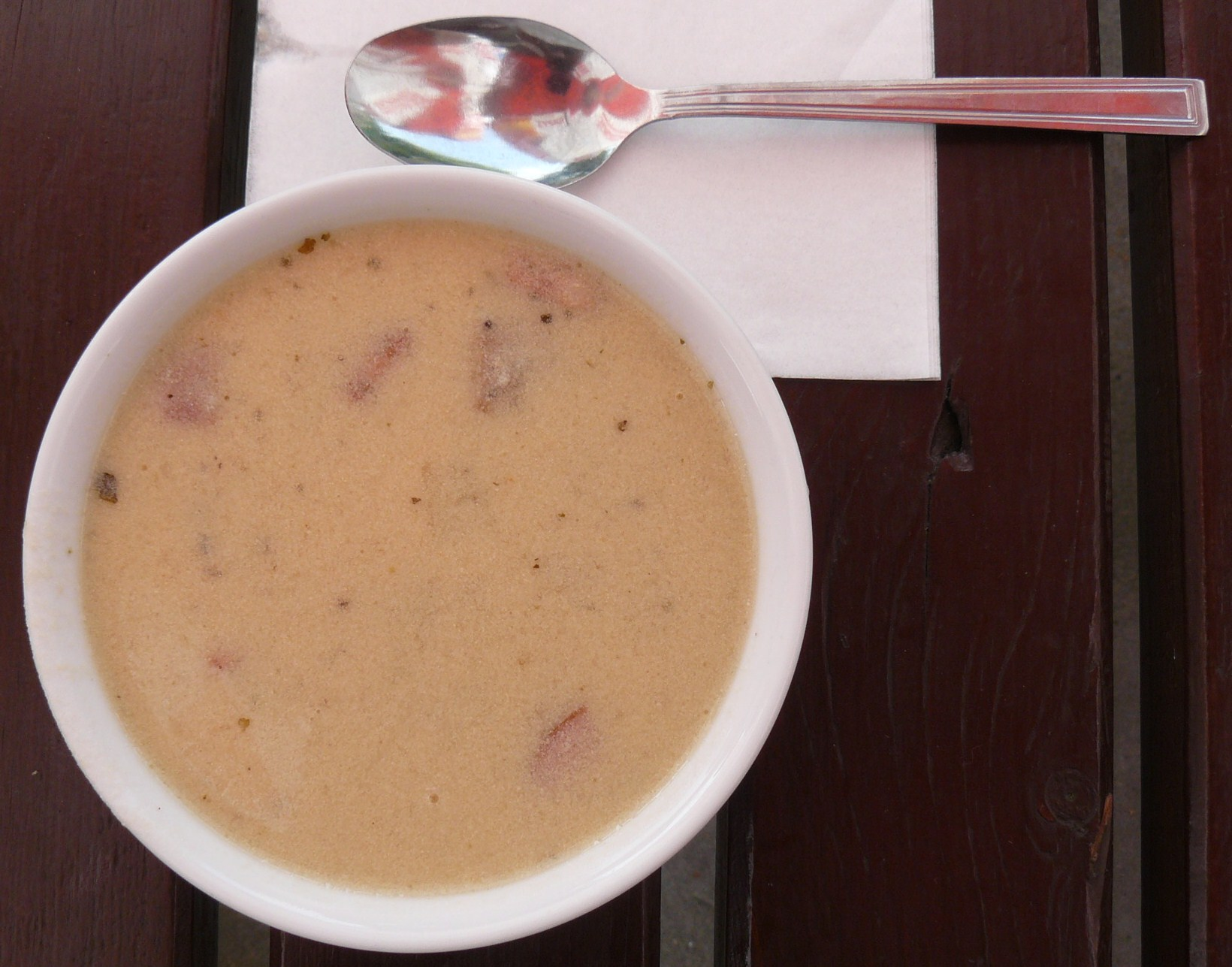
Zalewajka from Piła

Zalewajka is a traditional rustic soup made of diced and boiled potatoes and overflowed with sour rye made from sourdough bread. It also often contains Polish sausage and dried mushrooms.

== Origin ==
The soup comes from central part of Poland. The first mentions of it appeared in 19th century in Łódź and Radomsko. The basic component of diet for people from those areas were potatoes and mushrooms. Potatoes constituted the base of the majority of the dishes people from Łódź and Radomsko prepared. They were served in different ways like boiled, mashed or fried. Thanks to its simplicity in the 19th and 20th century zalewajka became popular around the country to places like Kielce and Zagłębię Dąbrowskie.

== Zalewajka recipes ==
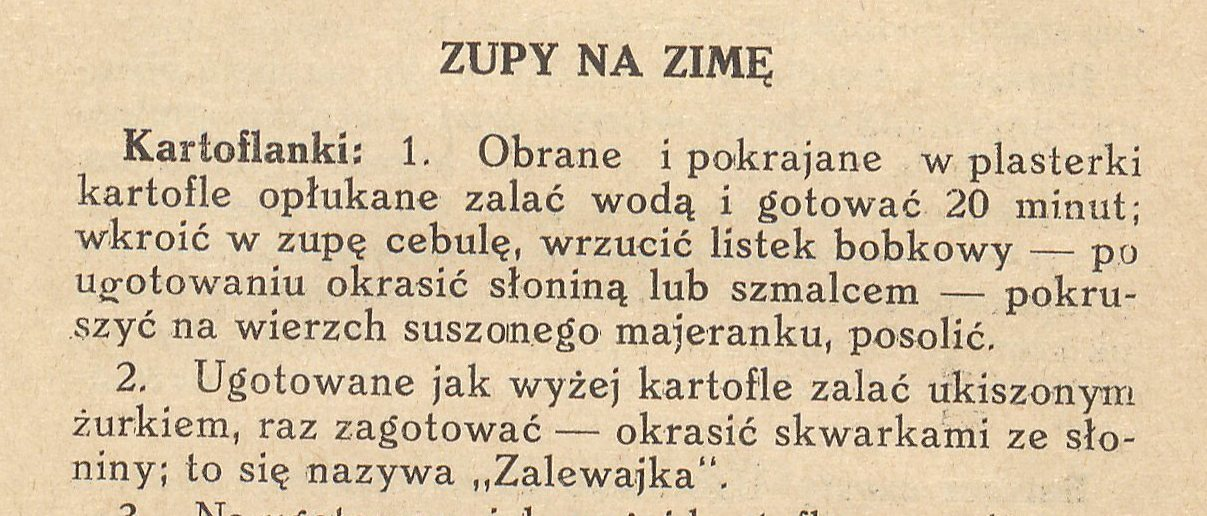
Zalewajka - recipe from a 1933 cookbook

There are a lot of recipes for this kind of soup which are different because of the region of Poland they were prepared.

=== Łódź ===
Main ingredients of the soup are bread sourdough, water, sausages and onion slices. Also added are wheat flour, sour cream and potatoes.

The potatoes are peeled, cut into small cubes, then put into water and boiled. Sliced sausages and chopped onion are fried on the pan. When the potatoes are almost boiled, sausage and bread sourdough are added. After careful mixing, flour with the sour cream and the pinch of salt is added.

=== Świętokrzyska ===
This recipe originated in the Świętokrzyskie region. It's quite similar to Łódź recipe, but garlic and bacon added and less of sour cream used. The cooking process itself is almost the same except putting bacon into the soup.

=== Radomsko ===
Zalewajka from Radomsko is similar, but with more spices like marjoram and dried mushrooms. Cooked the same way as in the recipes from Łódź and Świętokrzyskie but without meat.

== See also ==
- List of soups
