= Netto Marken-Discount =

German chain of discount supermarkets

Netto Marken-Discount Stiftung & Co. KG

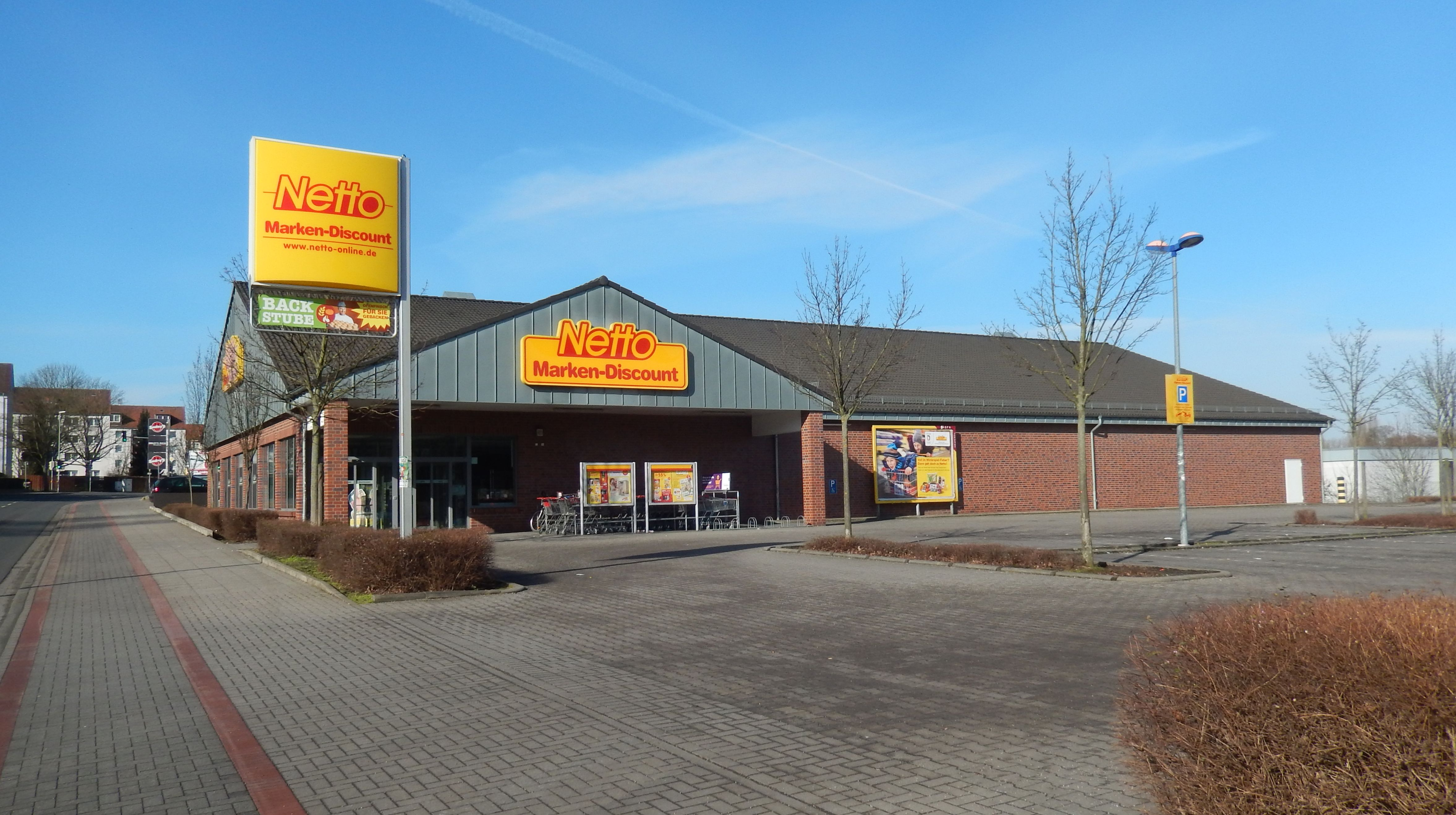
- Netto Marken-Discount store in Hannover.
- Industry: Retail
- Founded: 1928; 98 years ago
- Headquarters: Maxhütte-Haidhof, Bavaria, Germany,
- Number of locations: 4,270 (2022)
- Area served: Germany
- Products: Supermarket
- Revenue: €14.6 billion (2020)
- Number of employees: 84,000 (2020)
- Parent: Edeka
- Website: netto-online.de

Netto Marken-Discount (also known as just Netto [ˈnɛto], formerly Plus) is a German discount supermarket chain owned by the German supermarket cooperative Edeka Group, and operates mostly in the south and west of Germany. The company reached its 1000th store in 2004, then aggressively expanded to the 4000th store in 2009, making it the largest discounter in Germany.

== History ==
The company was founded by Michael Schels in Regensburg in 1928 as a food wholesaler. In 1971, the first own retail branch was opened under the name SuDi (SuperDiscount) in Beilngries, and further branches followed until 1983.

The Netto discount concept was developed in 1983 and implemented in the first supermarket in Regensburg. The 50 SuDi branches that already existed at that time were successively converted to the new concept by 1990.

In 2009, the Edeka Group completed the acquisition of the Plus supermarket chain, converting the Plus supermarket locations into Netto supermarkets.

The Netto Marken-Discount retail concept is to offer well-known brands at low prices, which contrasts with the strategy of competitors Aldi and Lidl who mainly offer products badged under proprietary store brand names.

The chain is unrelated to the Danish Netto chain, which has operations in several German states, or the French-owned Netto discount store that used the same logo. However Edeka owned 25% of a joint venture with the Danish Netto, which was sold in 2012.
