= Cezary Stefańczyk =

Polish footballer

Personal information
- Full name: Cezary Stefańczyk
- Date of birth: 21 February 1984 (age 42)
- Place of birth: Radomsko, Poland
- Height: 1.84 m (6 ft 1/2 in)
- Position: Defender

Team information
- Current team: Warta Działoszyn
- Number: 20

Youth career
- RKS Radomsko

Senior career*
Years	Team	Apps	(Gls)
2000	RKS Radomsko		
2000–2001	Omega Kleszczów		
2001	Warta Działoszyn		
2002–2003	RKS Radomsko	0	(0)
2003–2004	Heko Czermno		
2004	RKS Radomsko	16	(0)
2005–2006	KSZO Ostrowiec	33	(0)
2006	RKS Radomsko		
2007	Concordia Piotrków Trybunalski		
2007–2008	ŁKS Łomża	27	(0)
2008–2009	Pelikan Łowicz	27	(0)
2009–2011	Zawisza Bydgoszcz	60	(5)
2011–2012	ŁKS Łódź	13	(0)
2012–2013	Zawisza Bydgoszcz	24	(0)
2013	Górnik Łęczna	14	(0)
2013–2020	Wisła Płock	204	(5)
2020–2021	RKS Radomsko	15	(0)
2021	KS Niedośpielin	14	(2)
2021–	Warta Działoszyn	107	(108)
- * Club domestic league appearances and goals as of 16:58, 24 June 2025 (UTC)

Cezary Stefańczyk (born 21 February 1984) is a Polish professional footballer who plays as a defender for Warta Działoszyn.

== Career ==
In June 2011, he joined ŁKS Łódź on a one-year contract. After a half-year spell with Łódź, he terminated his contract and returned to his former team Zawisza Bydgoszcz in early February 2012.

On 17 August 2020, he returned to his hometown club RKS Radomsko in the fourth-tier III liga.
