= Karol Świtalski =

The Reverend Karol Świtalski
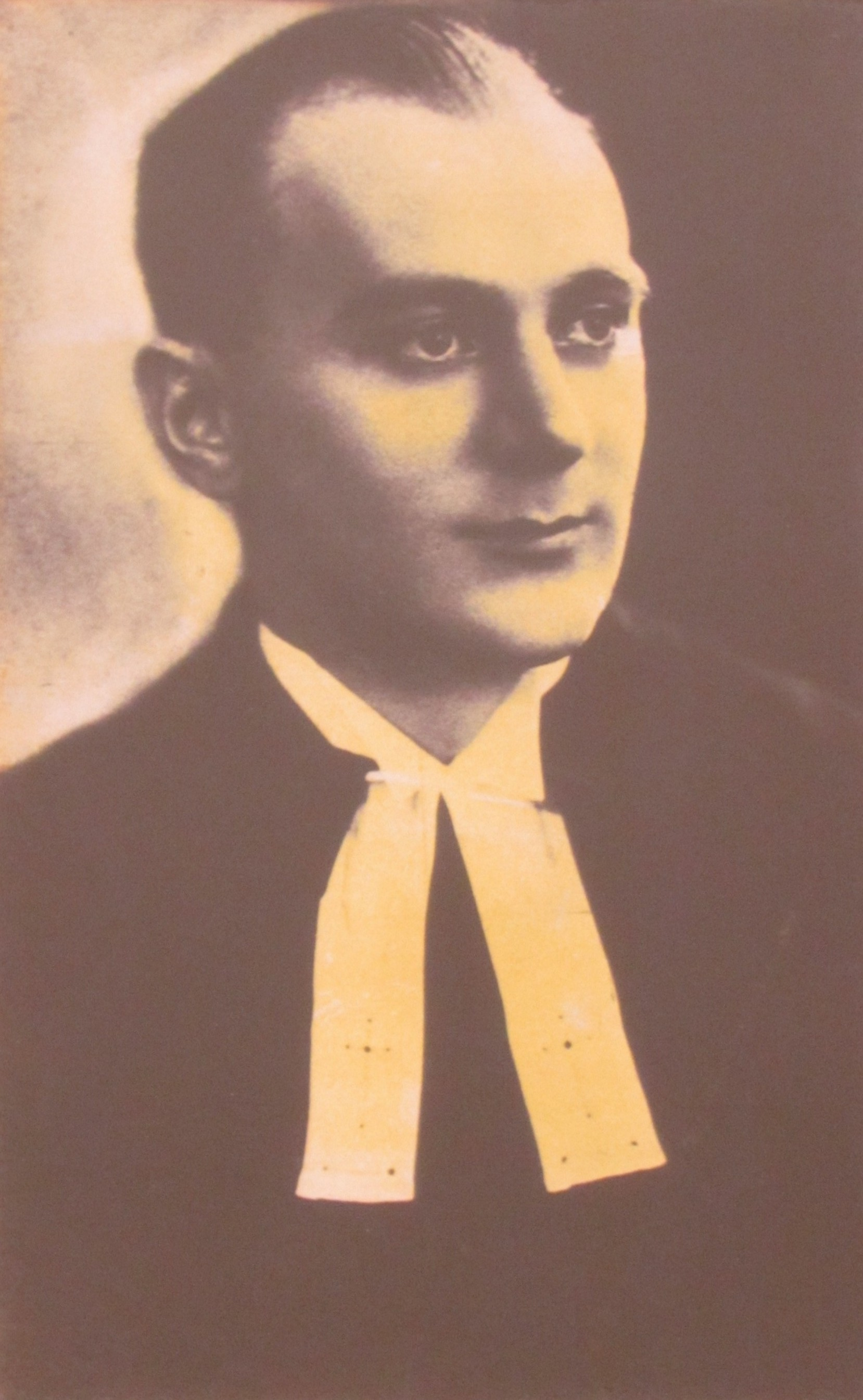
- Church: Evangelical Church of the Augsburg Confession in Poland

Orders
- Ordination: 13 October 1929

Personal details
- Born: 23 October 1902 Radomsko, Vistula Land, Russian Empire (now Poland)
- Died: 2 June 1993 (aged 90) Bensheim, Hesse, Germany
- Parents: Karol Śwital • Amelia Kawecka

Karol Edward Świtalski (23 October 1902 – 2 June 1993) was a Polish Lutheran priest and military chaplain. During the 1930s, he was a senior chaplain for Lutherans in the Polish Armed Forces.

== Early life and formation ==
Świtalski was born in Radomsko, then located with Vistula Land, part of the Russian Empire. He was the son of Karol Śwital and Amelia (née Kawecka). He studied the humanities at a gymnasium, before studying at the Protestant faculty of theology at the University of Warsaw. He was ordained a priest on 13 October 1929 in the Holy Trinity Church in Warsaw.

== Early priesthood ==
From 1929 to 1931, Świtalski taught at the Lutheran seminary in Działdowo, and from 1931 to 1932, he ministered in Łomża. On 26 February 1931, he was admitted to the chaplaincy and was called to active duty as the Lutheran chaplain at the headquarters of the Ninth District of the Polish Armed Forces in Brześć nad Bugiem (at the time a Polish city, today located in Belarus). On 8 December 1935 he was transferred to the Seventh District in Poznań, as the successor to Fr. Józef Mamica (pl). There, he served both as military chaplain and pastor of the local church. On 23 February 1936 he founded a military church in Poznań, which during the interwar period also was open to civilians. Military services were held at the church three times a month, and a civilian service once a month. Later in 1936, he engaged in an evangelization campaign among the Lutheran population of Kępno, and on 6 September, he was involved in the founding of the Polish Lutheran Society. From 1937 to 1939 he was on the editorial committee of Voice of the Evangelical, a publication based in Warsaw.

== World War II and later career ==
At the outbreak of World War II, Świtalski was unable to continue his work as a priest due to Nazi persecution. He went into hiding under an assumed name, working as a farm laborer and later as a clerk. At the end of the war, he came out of hiding. On 30 March 1945, he met with church colleagues at the Polish Lutheran Society building in Poznań, celebrating Mass and discussing how to normalize the Church's activities. Despite their active approach, they were unable to immediately win back the church properties in Poznań. In 1946, they received permission to temporarily make use of a cemetery chapel. Later that year, he commenced activities in nearby cities, assisting at the parish in Leszno, and founding two new parishes in Gorzów Wielkopolski and Szczecin. On 23 September 1948, he resigned from his position in Poznań and began working full-time as the administrator of the two parishes in Gorzów Wielkopolski and Szczecin. On 4 July 1950, he became pastor of the parish in Konin, while still living in Poznań as the Konan parsonage was taken. He also supported congregations in Grodziec, Izbica Kujawska, Koło, Sompolno, and Zagórów. Around 1960 he became a deputy bishop in the Lutheran Diocese of Pomerania-Greater Poland.

== Later life and death ==
In June 1964, Świtalski emigrated to West Germany for personal reasons. There, he remained active in pastoral work with the Polish Lutheran community in the Frankfurt area. He maintained connections with the Polish Lutheran Church Abroad, a now-defunct denomination based in London, United Kingdom. For his efforts back in Poland, he received the Medal of the 15th Anniversary of the Union of Border Soldiers. He died in Bensheim, Germany, on 2 June 1993.

== Bibliography ==
- Domasłowski, Jerzy (2005). Kościół Ewangelicko-Augsburski w Poznaniu i w Zachodniej Wielkopolsce w latach 1919-2005. Poznań. ISBN 8392288904.
- Mendrok, Andrzej (2006). Historia Parafii Ewangelicko-Augsburskiej w Koninie. Konin. ISBN 8391646270.
- Rej, Krzysztof Jan (2000). Ewangelicka służba duszpasterska w Wojsku Polskim 1919-1950. Warsaw.
