= Biedronka =

Polish supermarket chain

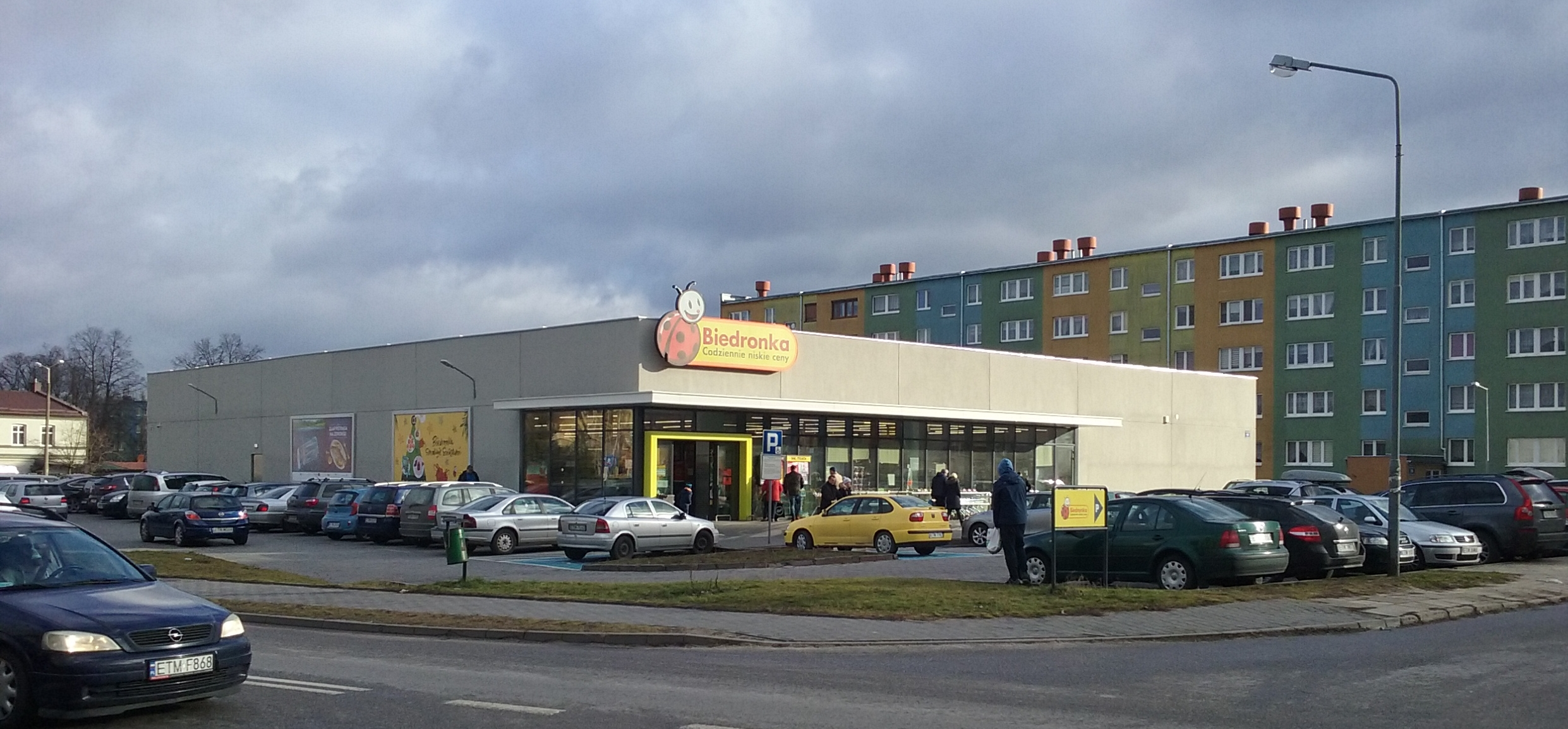
- Biedronka store in Tomaszów Mazowiecki
- Type: Joint-stock company
- Industry: Retail
- Founded: 1995; 31 years ago
- Founder: Mariusz Świtalski
- Headquarters: ul. Żniwna 5, Kostrzyn, Poland
- Number of locations: 3,730 stores (2024)
- Area served: Poland, Slovakia
- Key people: Pedro de Castro Soares
- Products: Discount store, supermarket
- Revenue: ▲102.0 billion PLN (2024)
- Operating income: ▼3.9 billion PLN (2024)
- Net income: ▼3.4 billion PLN (2024)
- Total assets: ▲26.8 billion PLN (2024)
- Total equity: ▼4.6 billion PLN (2024)
- Number of employees: 84,000 (2024)
- Parent: Jerónimo Martins
- Website: biedronka.pl, biedronka.sk

Biedronka is a Polish supermarket chain. It is the largest chain of discount shops in Poland with 3,730 stores and 84,000 employees at the end of 2024. It is owned by the Portuguese group Jerónimo Martins. Its name means "ladybug", and a cartoon ladybug is the company's logo.

Biedronka sells mainly local products, many of which are manufactured under the company's own label. It also sells some Portugal-made products, mostly wine. Initially targeted at lower-income customers, it is now one of the most popular supermarket chains in Poland.

Biedronka has had a dominant position in Poland's grocery retail market for over a decade, and its main competitor in Poland is Lidl, although competition is rising in form of Kaufland and Aldi.

== History ==
The founder of Biedronka was entrepreneur Mariusz Świtalski, owner of Elektromis. The first Biedronka store opened its doors on April 6, 1995, on Newtona Street in Poznań. In 1997, Jerónimo Martins acquired 210 stores from Elektromis, marking the beginning of a significant expansion phase for the chain.

Since then, Biedronka has experienced rapid growth, exemplified by milestones such as the opening of its 1,500th store in March 2010 in Poznań on ul. Bobrzańska, followed by reaching 2,000 stores by 2012. In September 2014, the chain celebrated the launch of its 2,500th store, and in February 2019, it reached the milestone of 3,000 stores.

In 2023, Biedronka announced its intention to enter Slovakia by the end of 2024, making it Biedronka's first expansion abroad. In March 2025, Biedronka opened its first store in Slovakia.

In 2008, Biedronka acquired and transformed over 120 stores previously operated by the German chain Plus into its own network of stores.

Biedronka's success is reflected in its consistent rise in rankings among Poland's largest enterprises. In the Rzeczpospolita list of the 500 largest enterprises in Poland, Biedronka has steadily climbed higher each year.

Similarly, in a ranking compiled by weekly newspaper Polityka, Jerónimo Martins Polska SA, the parent company of Biedronka, achieved 5th place in 2009 and 4th place in 2010.

== Gallery ==
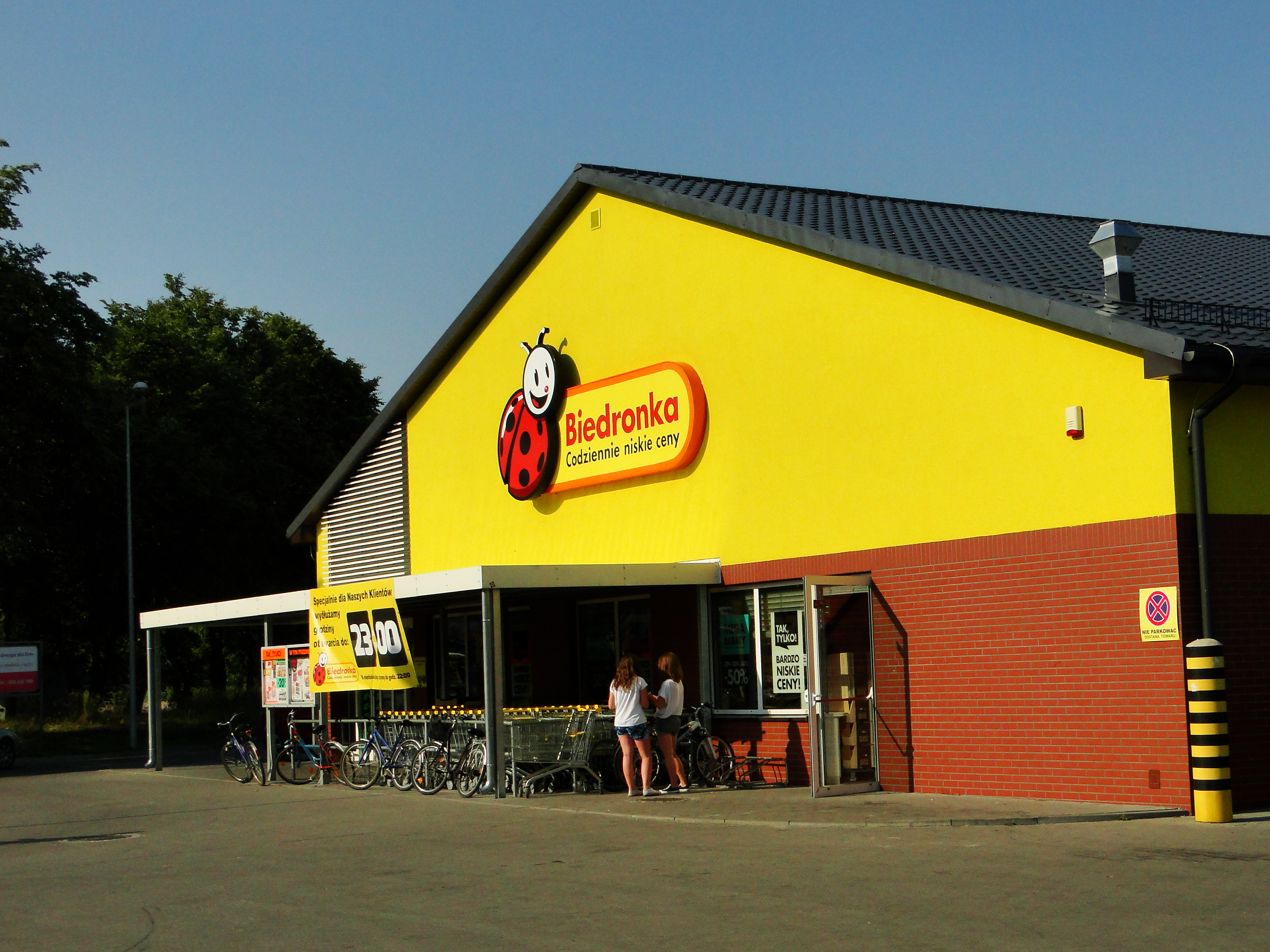
A Biedronka store in Piecki

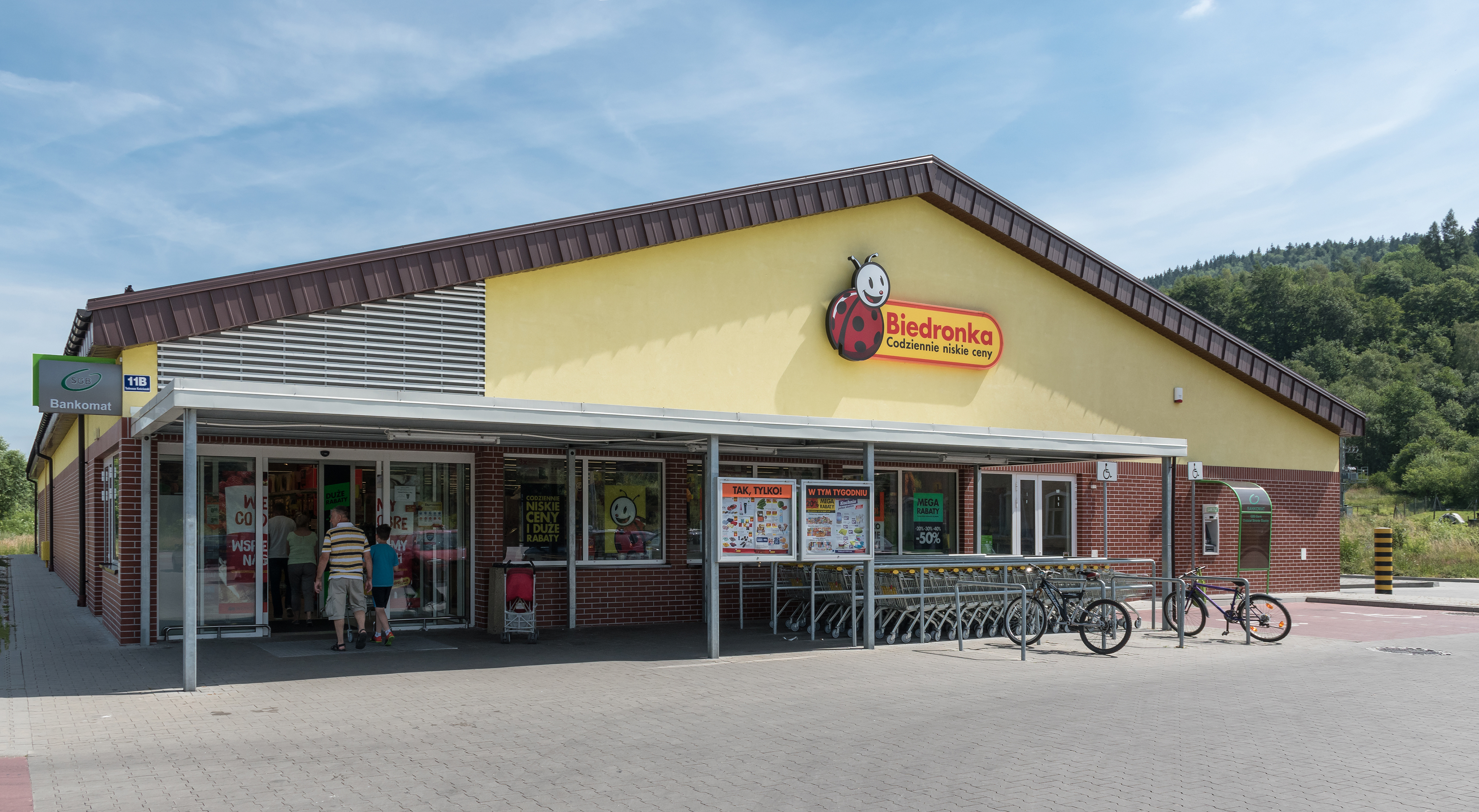
A Biedronka store in Stronie Śląskie

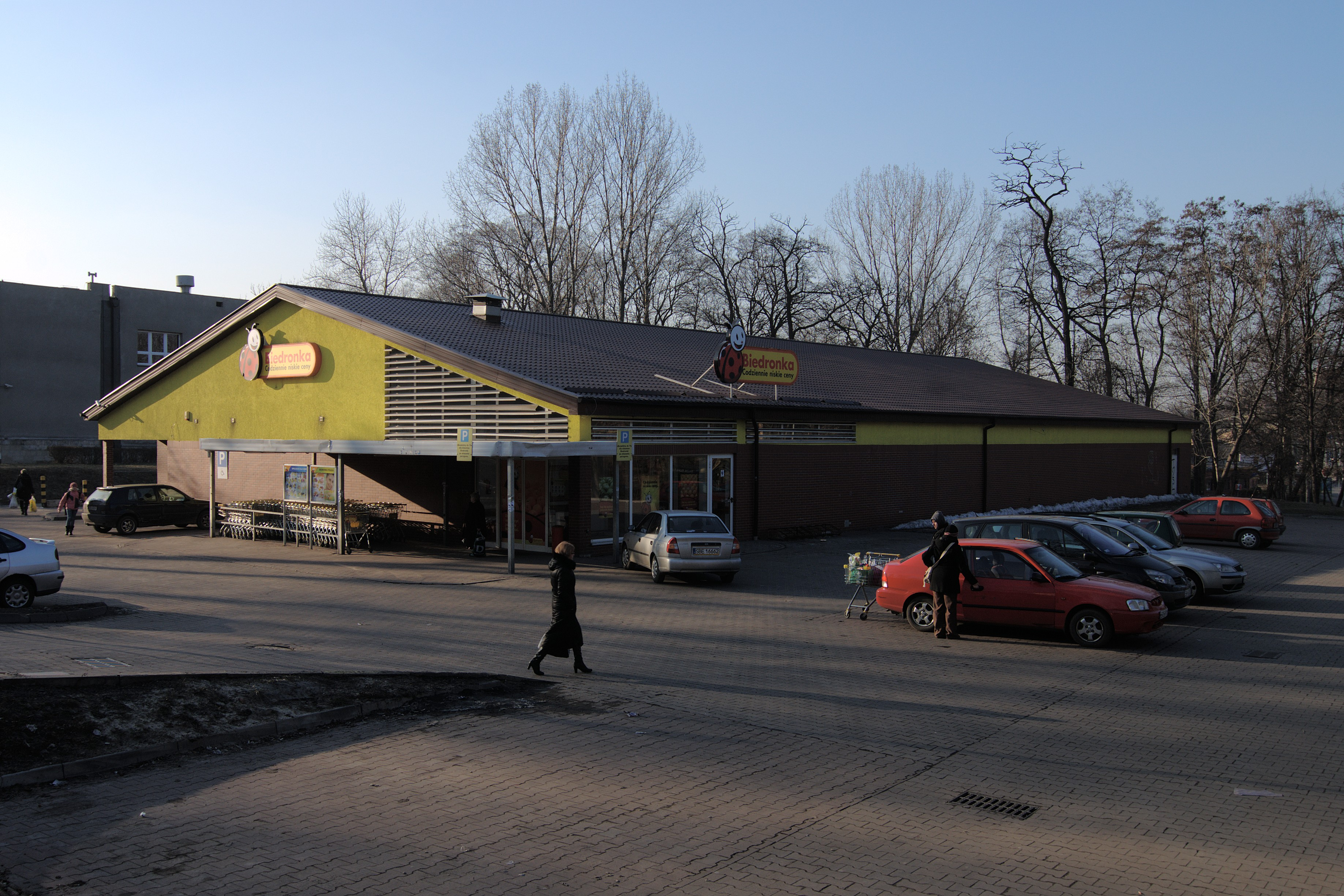
A Biedronka store in Ruda Śląska

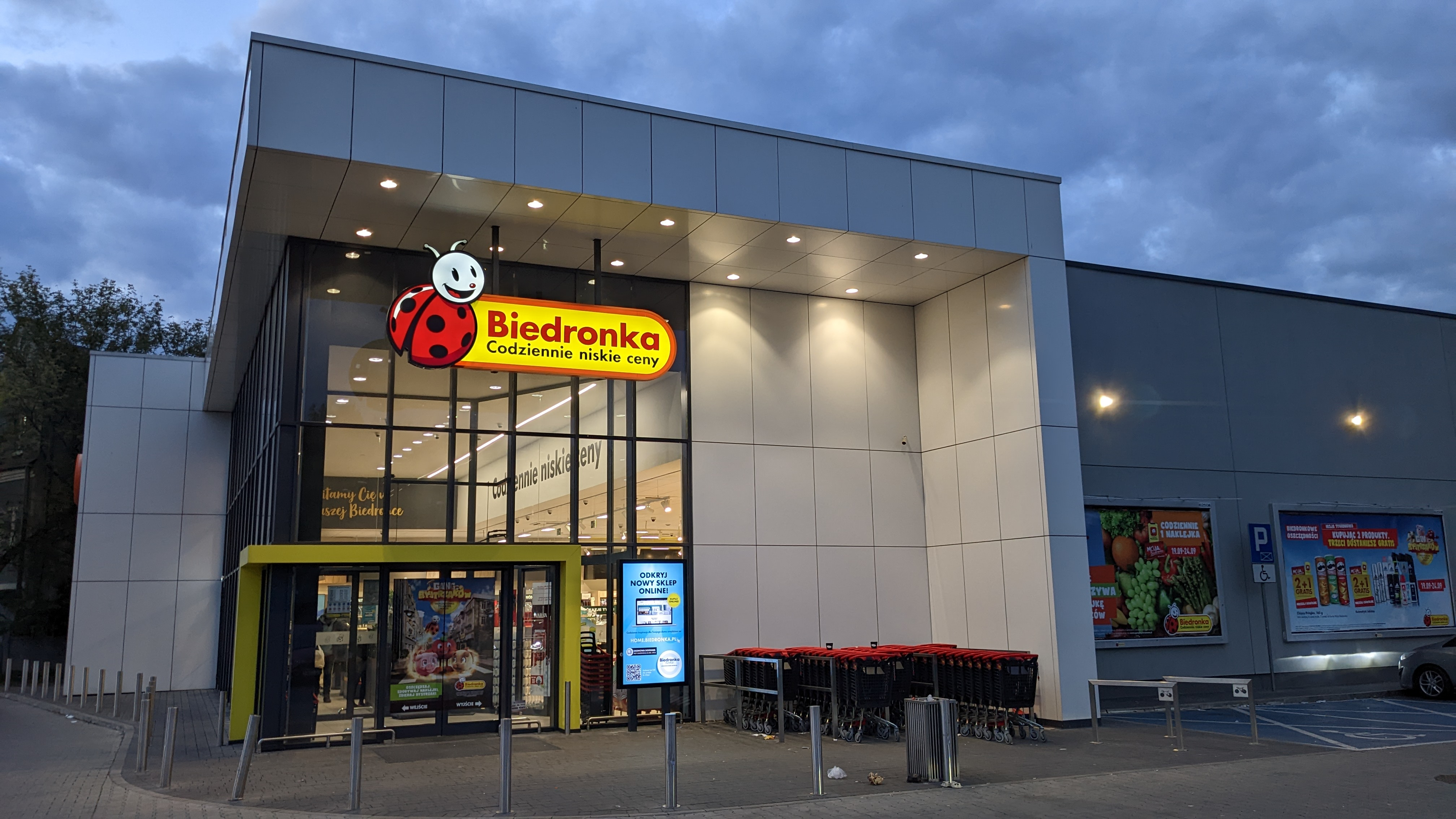
A Biedronka store in Warsaw

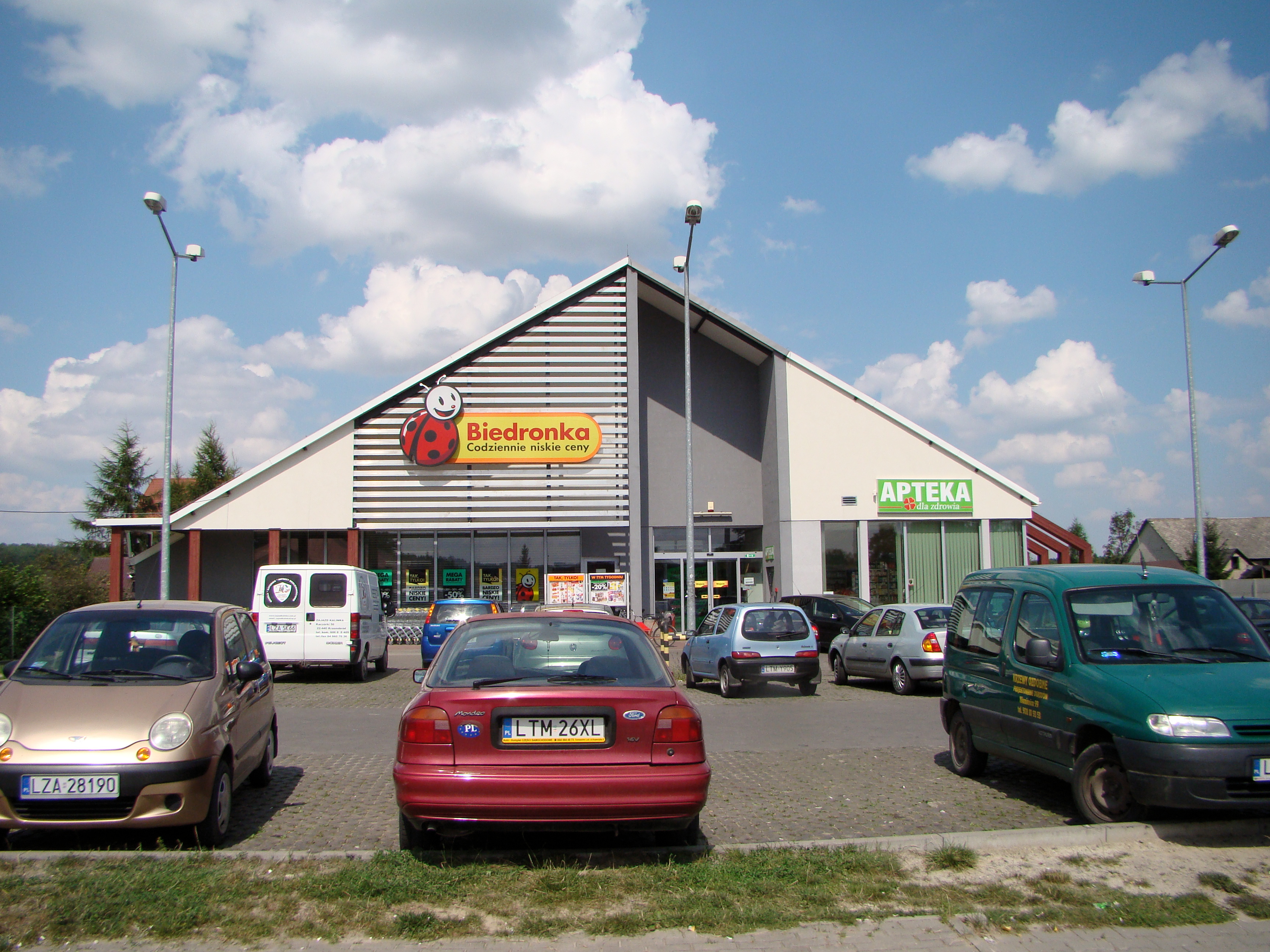
A Biedronka store in Krasnobród

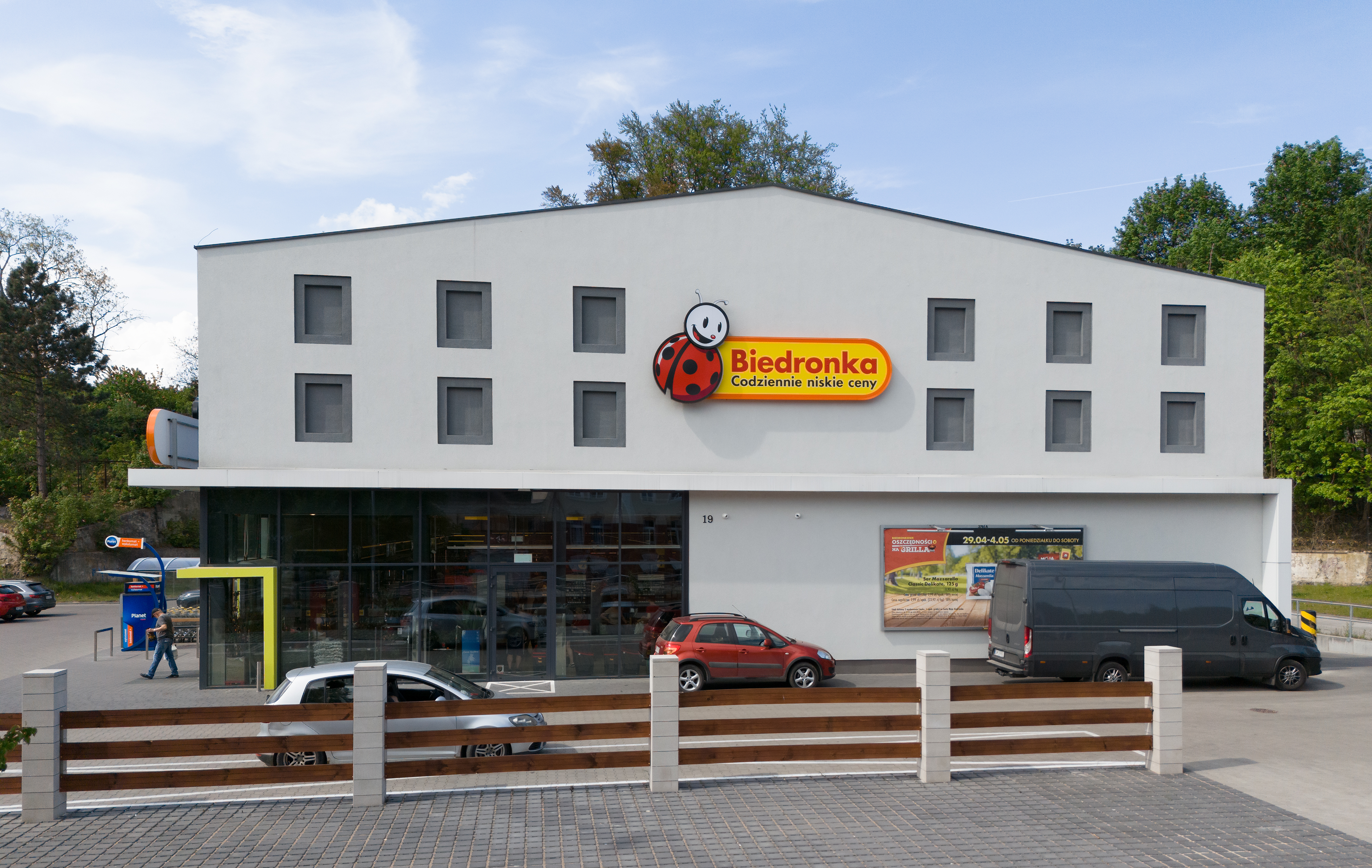
A Biedronka store in Kłodzko

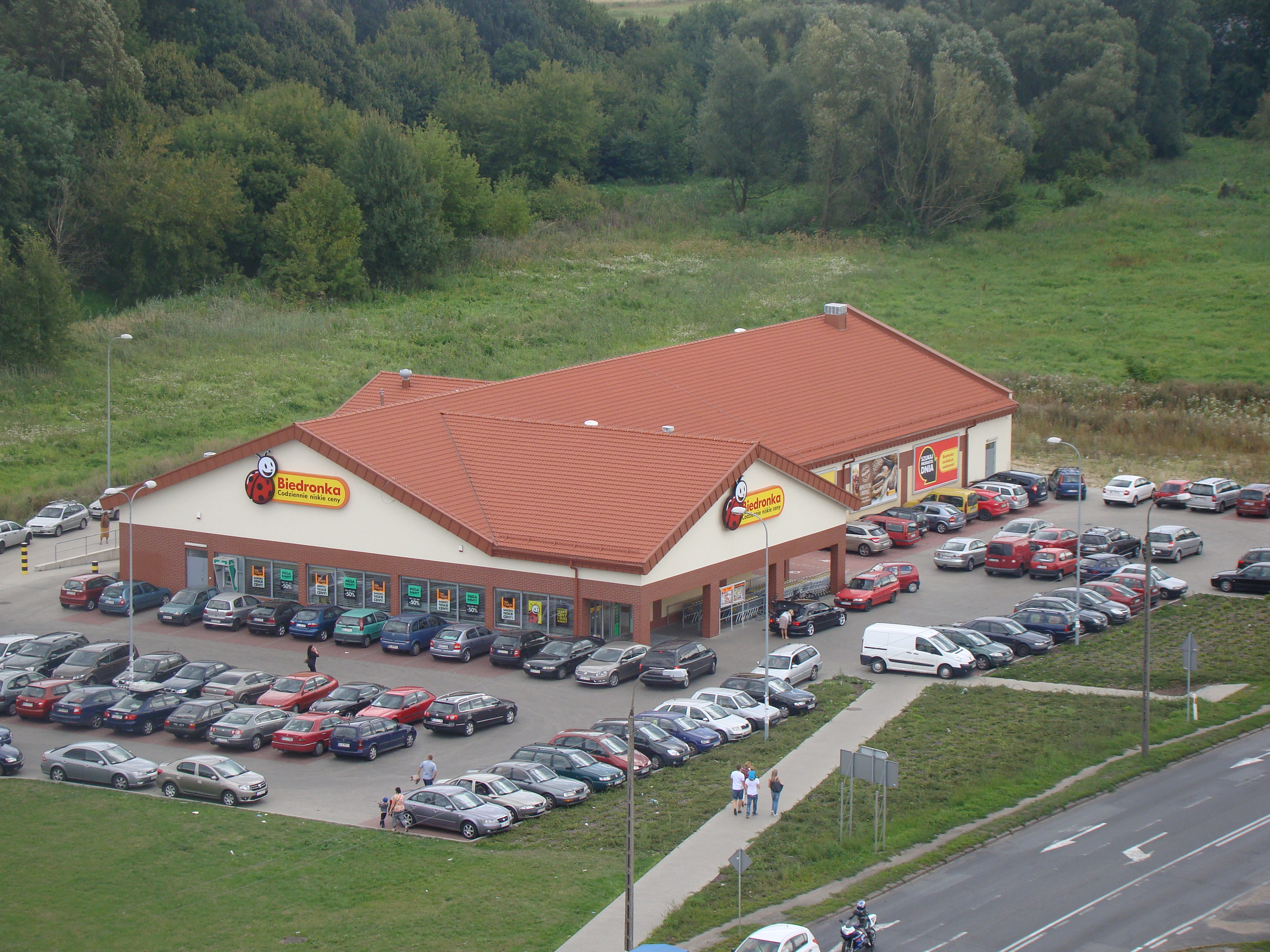
Aerial view of a Biedronka store in Łęczyca

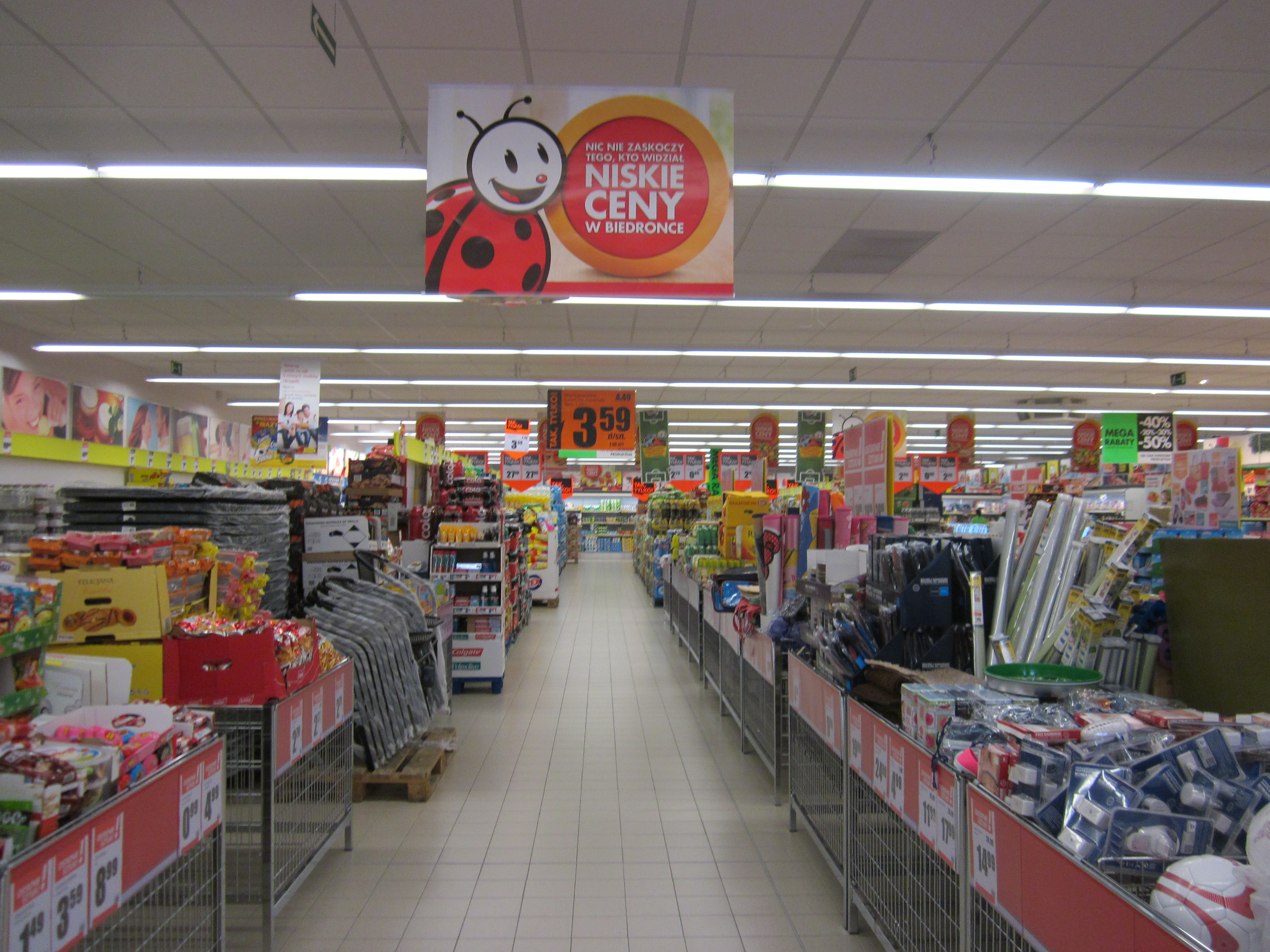
Inside a Biedronka store in Białystok

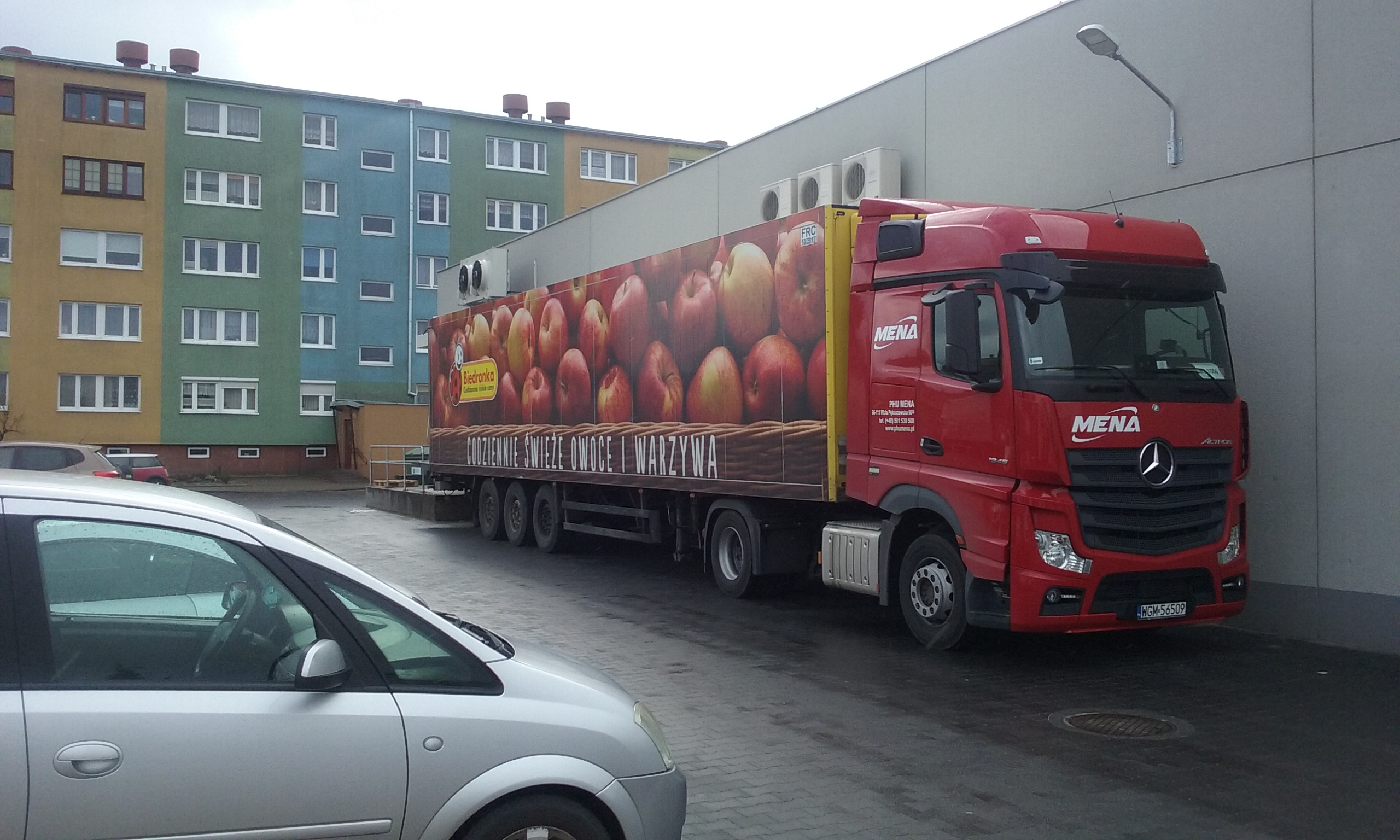
Biedronka's truck during unloading, Tomaszów Mazowiecki
