= Małpka Express =

Polish convenience store chain

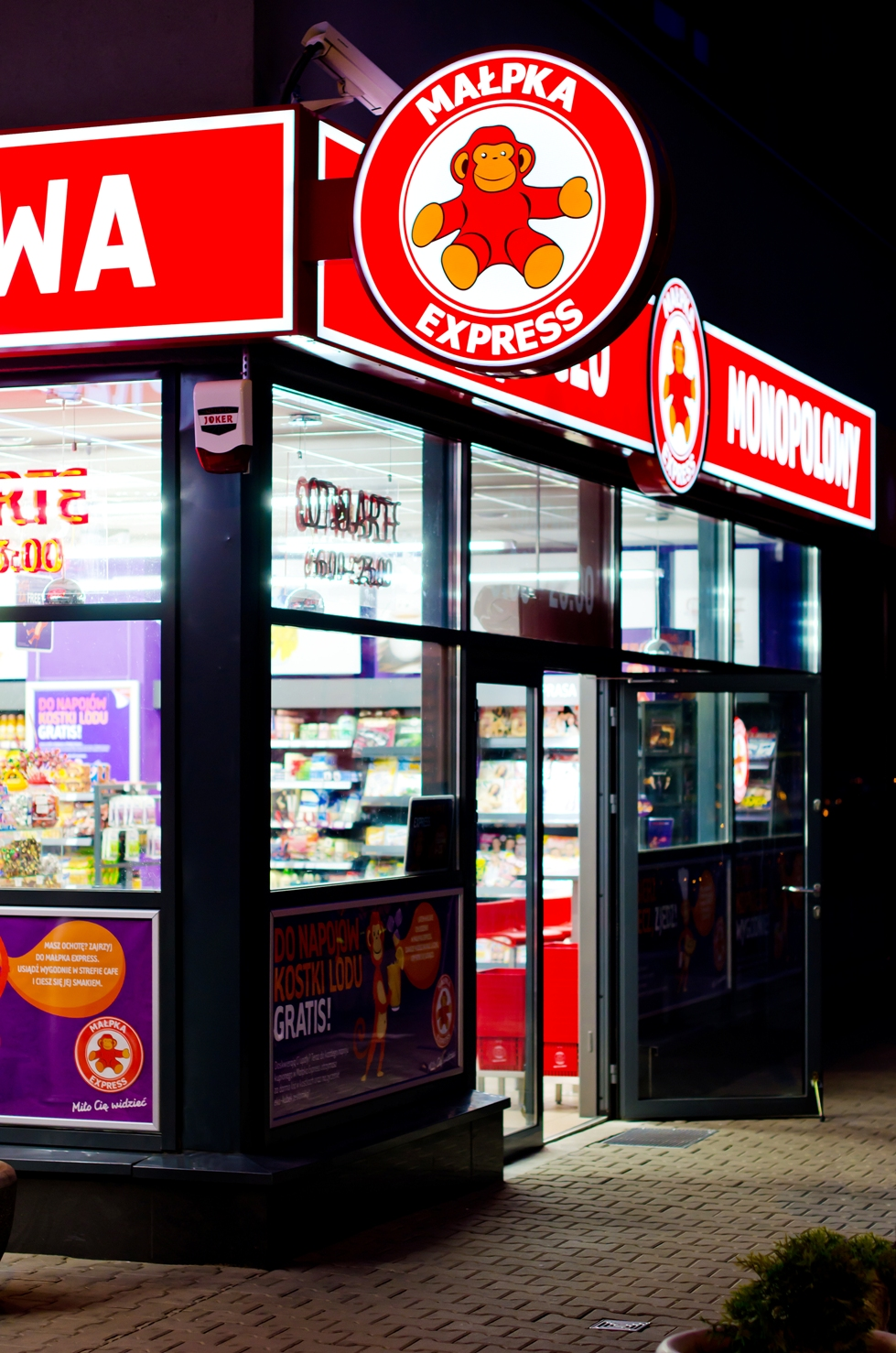
- Małpka Express Shop
- Type: Public
- Industry: Retail
- Founded: 3 January 2012
- Defunct: 1 September 2018
- Fate: Closed
- Headquarters: Poznań, Poland
- Area served: Poland
- Website: malpkaexpress.pl

Małpka Express was a retail chain operated by the firm Małpka S.A. with its headquarters in Poznań; in Poland.

== History ==
The first Małpka Express shop was opened in March 2012 in Warzymice in the West Pomeranian Voivodeship. From that point onward the chain has intensively increased the number of shops, opening about 150-200 new shops each year.

In September 2013, due to the acquisition of Małpka S.A. by the retail chain Czerwona Torebka, the Małpka S.A. joint-stock company joined the company. In 2015 the company was acquired by Forteam Investments. In July 2018 the company announced that they had serious problems and must close their shops. All shops closed on 1 September 2018.

== Format ==
Małpka Express is a chain of local convenience stores, which primarily focus on grocery and liquor assortments. The chain has an index of over 2500 products. These products include: grocery items, sweets, vegetables and fruit, dairy, cakes, alcohol, tobacco products, newspapers and magazines, cleaning agents and cosmetics.

Other than convenience stores the retail chain includes other services like Małpka Café, and milk bars. In November 2013 Małpka Express partnered with the internet shopping brand Merlin.pl as part of the Czerwona Torebka retail chain. Due to the synergy between the two companies, Małpka Express shops have Merlin.pl parcel pick-up points.

== Controversies ==
Its 2015 advertisement caused concern over its message for children telling them to buy sweets in the chain stores rather than more healthy food offered by school cafeterias.
