= Recheio =

Recheio Cash & Carry, S.A.
- Company type: Private, SA
- Industry: Retail
- Founded: Figueira da Foz (1972)
- Headquarters: Lisbon, Portugal
- Area served: Portugal, Madeira. Franchise in Azores
- Products: Cash and carry
- Parent: Jerónimo Martins
- Website: Recheio Website (In Portuguese)

Recheio is the biggest cash-and-carry chain of stores operating in Portugal.

== History ==
The company was born in Figueira da Foz in 1972, with the concept of auto-service for owners of small and medium commercial stores. In 1984, the company opened stores in Viseu and in 1986 in Aveiro and Vila Real.

In 1988, the group Jerónimo Martins acquired 60% of Recheio while buying the remaining 40% in 1989. In 1990, the group purchased a cash-and-carry store called Arminho in Braga and bought a store from Riberalves on Torres Vedras.

In 1993, they opened more stores in Valença and Mirandela and in 1995 they acquired a company called Jasil which added two more stores in Torres Novas and Leiria to their portfolio.

In 1996, they acquired the company Libarme, to add yet another store in Barcelos, while opening in the same year a store in Lisbon near the airport.

In 1997, they introduced a brand, MasterChef and acquired Coimbralimentar, adding another store in Coimbra. In 1985, the brand opened stores in Caldas da Rainha and Ramalde.

At the end of the decade, they opened a new store in Regedor. The chain continued to grow, opening stores in Lagos, Faro, Portimão, Leiria (This store replaced an older one), Intendente, Santa Maria da Feira, Fátima, Évora and Vila Franca de Xira.

In 2009, they created a second brand called Amanhecer and in 2010, they created another brand called Gourmês.

== Recheio's brands ==
As of 2014, the company marketed its products under several brands:

- MasterChef: Its positioning is: "best food at the best price".
- Amanhecer: Targets small business owners all consumers.
- Gourmês: Targets restaurants, coffee parlors and hotels. Its positioning is "high quality".

Although not mentioned, Euroshopper brand products can be acquired on Recheio stores.

== Amanhecer store project ==
Because of the success of the brand, in 2011, the company decided to launch 2 pilot mini-markets called Amanhecer and that only sold Amanhecer brand products in Lisbon and Viana do Castelo.

Currently in 2014, the chain counts with over 100 franchised stores in continental Portugal and on the Archipelagos of Madeira.

== See also ==
- Jerónimo Martins
- Pingo Doce
