= Pingo Doce =

Portuguese supermarket chain

Pingo Doce - Distribuição Alimentar, S.A.
- Type: Private, SA
- Industry: Retail
- Founded: 1980
- Founder: Ana Carriço
- Headquarters: Lisbon, Portugal
- Area served: Portugal
- Products: Supermarkets
- Parent: Jerónimo Martins (51%); Ahold Delhaize (49%)
- Website: pingodoce.pt

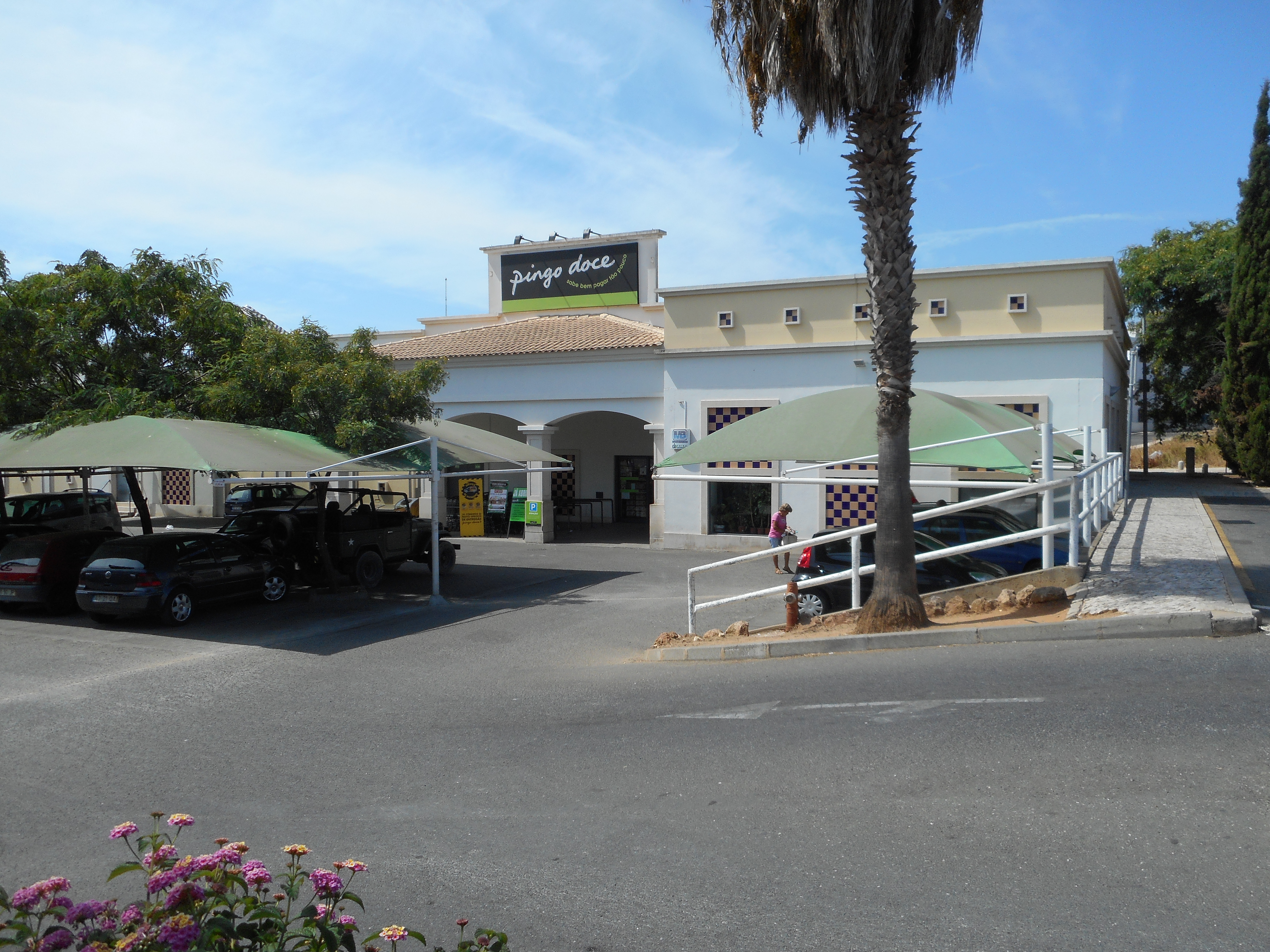
Pingo Doce (Albufeira)

Pingo Doce (Sweet Drop in English) is one of the largest supermarket operators in Portugal, with 482 stores as of 2023, placing it just behind Continente which is the largest food retailer in the country.

It is owned by the Portuguese company Jerónimo Martins and the Dutch-based Ahold Delhaize. Since 1992, Pingo Doce has been operated as a joint venture by Jerónimo Martins, in which it holds 51% and the Dutch retail chain Ahold Delhaize 49%. In the 1990s, Jerónimo Martins acquired Brazilian supermarket chain Sé Supermercados, which became the Brazilian equivalent of Pingo Doce. In Poland, since 1997 the group has operated Biedronka, the country's largest food retail chain. In the early 2000s, Companhia Brasileira de Distribuição / Grupo Pão de Açúcar, bought out Sé, rebranding its stores as Pão de Açúcar and CompreBem.

Pingo Doce's logo from 1998 to 2008

Feira Nova's logo from 1998 to 2010

Since 2008, the chain has used its current logo, repositioned itself in the market, merged the Feira Nova supermarkets and hypermarkets into the Pingo Doce brand and has done aggressive marketing and advertising campaigns in order to maintain its position. The Jerónimo Martins Group began establishing local businesses in Colombia in March 2013 through Ara. From 2008 to 2010, Pingo Doce took over the Feira Nova brand. In 2021, Pingo Doce popularized the slogan "Quem trouxe, quem trouxe? Foi o Pingo Doce!" (Who brought [it]? Who brought [it]? It was Pingo Doce!) with a catchy Christmas jingle.

In April 2025, Pingo Doce launched what it described as the first restaurant in Portugal to implement AI-powered self-checkout terminals. Located in the Comida Fresca unit at Alegro Sintra shopping center, the system recognizes food items directly on customers’ trays using advanced image recognition. The technology was developed by the French startup Retail Robotics Solutions, which specializes in computer vision for foodservice automation. According to Pingo Doce, the AI solution aims to reduce wait times and improve the overall customer experience.

== See also ==
- 2012 rush to Pingo Doce
- Recheio
- Jerónimo Martins
