= Jerónimo Martins =

Portuguese trading company

Jerónimo Martins SGPS, S.A.
- Type: Sociedade Anónima
- Traded as: Euronext Lisbon: JMT; PSI-20 component
- ISIN: PTJMT0AE0001
- Industry: Retail
- Founded: 1792; 234 years ago
- Founder: Jerónimo Martins
- Headquarters: Rua Actor António Silva n.º7 1649-033 Lisbon, Portugal
- Key people: Pedro Soares dos Santos (CEO)
- Services: Food Distribution: Discount and convenience stores; Supermarkets; Cash-and-carries; Specialised Retail: Health and beauty stores; Coffee shops; Agribusiness
- Revenue: €35.991 billion (2025)
- Net income: €646 million (2025)
- Number of employees: 147,709 (2025)
- Website: www.jeronimomartins.com

Jerónimo Martins SGPS, SA (JM) is a Portuguese corporate group that operates in food distribution and specialised retail. It operates more than 6,500 stores in Portugal, Poland, Slovakia and Colombia.

Jerónimo Martins is listed on Euronext Lisbon, under the code JMT, and is part of the PSI-20 index.

== Operations ==
In Portugal, Jerónimo Martins operates the Pingo Doce chain of super- and hypermarkets as well as the Recheio chain of cash-and-carry stores.

The group is the majority owner of Jerónimo Martins Retail (JMR), which operates the Pingo Doce super- and hypermarket chain in Portugal. JMR has been run as a 51%-49% joint venture with the Dutch firm Ahold Delhaize since 1982.

The Group also operates in the specialized retail sector in Portugal, where Jerónimo Martins owns the Jeronymo coffee shops.

Jerónimo Martins owns Biedronka, the largest chain of discount stores in Poland, which generates approximately 70% of the Group’s total sales. Also in Poland, the Group operates the health and beauty and cosmetic chain Hebe.

In 2013, Jerónimo Martins Group started its operations in Colombia with the opening of the first Ara stores as well as its first distribution centre.

Since 2025, Biedronka has been developing a food retail operation in Slovakia and opened the first Biedronka store in March 2025.

Early June 2026, a reconstruction programme funded by the Jerónimo Martins Foundation, with a total value of €20 million, was launched to rebuild homes, nurseries, and buildings after Storm Kristin affected Portugal severely.

== Former operations ==
It once owned Lillywhites, a British company focused on sports goods (sold in 2002 to Sports World International); a stake in Eurocash, a cash-and-carry in Poland; and Supermercados Sé, a supermarket chain in Brazil (sold to Grupo Pão de Açúcar in 2002).

Until 2016, Jerónimo Martins had industrial facilities focused on the production of several Unilever brands. This was carried out through the joint venture company Unilever Jerónimo Martins, which was 45% owned by JM and 55% owned by Unilever.

== Key figures ==
Year	Sales (in million €)	EBITDA (in million €)	Net profit (in million €)
2025	35,991	2,480	646
2024	33,464	2,232	599
2023	30,608	2,168	756
2022	25,385	1,854	590
2021	20,889	1,585	463
2020	19,293	1,423	312
2019	18,638	1,045	433
2018	17,337	960	401
2017	16,276	922	385
2016	14,622	862	593
2015	13,728	800	333
2014	12,680	733	302
2013	11,829	777	382

== See also ==
- Pingo Doce
- Recheio
- Biedronka
