= List of supermarket chains in Italy =

This is a list of supermarket chains in Italy.

== List of current Italian supermarket chains ==
Logo	Name	Stores	Founded/came to Italy	Owned by	Type of store	Notes
	A&O	802	1964	Selex	supermarket and convenience	
	Alì	117	1958	Selex	supermarket, superstore and convenience	
	ALDI	201	2018	Aldi Süd	discount	
	Basko	60	1987	Sogegross (Agorà)	supermarket	
	Bennet	54	1964	Végé	supermarket and hypermarket	
	Carrefour	1,450	1993	NewPrinces Group	supermarket, hypermarket and convenience	
	COAL	320	1960	Végé	supermarket and convenience	
	Conad	3,383	1962	Conad	supermarket, hypermarket and convenience	+ 425 concept stores.
	Coop	1,822	1967	Coop Italia	supermarket, hypermarket and convenience	
	Crai	1,928	1973	Crai	supermarket and convenience	
	Decò	500	2006	Végé	supermarket, hypermarket and convenience	
	Despar	1,519	1959	Spar	supermarket, hypermarket and convenience	
	DiMeglio	560	1999	Végé	supermarket and convenience	
	Doro	56	1991	Sogegross (Agorà)	supermarket	
	DPiù	340	1992	Selex	discount	
	Ekom	125	1993	Sogegross (Agorà)	discount	
	Eataly	13	2004	Oscar Farinetti	supermarket, superstore and hypermarket	
	Esselunga	170	1957	Supermarkets Italiani	supermarket, superstore and convenience	
	EuroSpin	1,200	1993	EuroSpin	discount	
	Famila	300	1984	Selex	supermarket and hypermarket	
	Il Gigante	68	1972	Selex	supermarket and hypermarket	
	iN's Mercato	560	1993	Gruppo PAM	discount	
	Iper	22	1974	Finiper	superstore and hypermarket	
	Iperal	56	1986	Agorà Network	supermarket and hypermarket	
	IperTosano	21	1970	Végé	hypermarket	
	Lidl	785	1992	Lidl Italia	discount	
	Margherita	354	1991	Conad	convenience	Closed in 2021. All stores rebranded as Conad.
	Maxì	140	1967	Végé	supermarket	
	MD	795	1993	MD	discount	
	Mercatò	88	2007	Selex	supermarket, hypermarket and convenience	
	Migross	49	1974	Végé	supermarket, hypermarket and convenience	
	MPreis	19	2001	MPreis	supermarket	Mainly in South Tirol / Alto Adige.
	Nonna ISA	300	1950	Végé	supermarket	Mainly in Sardinia.
	Oasi Tigre	320	1955	Gruppo Gabrielli	superstore, supermarket and convenience	Mainly in Central Italy.
	Pam	386	1958	Gruppo PAM	supermarket and convenience	
	Panorama	25	1984	Gruppo PAM	hypermarket	
	Penny Market	466	1994	REWE Group	discount	
	Poli	68	1938	Agorà Network	supermarket and hypermarket	
	Prix Quality	176	1971	Prix Quality	supermarket	
	Rossetto	149	1958	Agorà Network	supermarket and convenience	
	RossoTono	70	2017	Végé	supermarket and convenience	Mainly in South Italy.
	Sidis	500	1962	Végé	discount, supermarket, hypermarket	
	Sigma	500	1962	D.IT	supermarket	
	Sisa	290	1975	D.IT	supermarket, hypermarket and convenience	
	Sogegross	252	1920	Agorà Network	discount, supermarket and convenience	
	Sole 365	100	2013	Selex	discount	Mainly in Campania.
	Supermercati DOK	200	1985	Selex	supermarket and convenience	Mainly in South Italy.
	Tigros	66	1979	Agorà Network	supermarket and superstore	
	Todis	190	1994	Conad	discount	
	Tuodì	400	1994	Gruppo Tuo	discount	Closed in 2023, sold to iN's, Penny and Conad.
	Unes	222	1967	Finiper	supermarket and convenience	
