= List of supermarket chains in Austria =

This is a list of supermarket chains in Austria. (As of April 2017/2026)

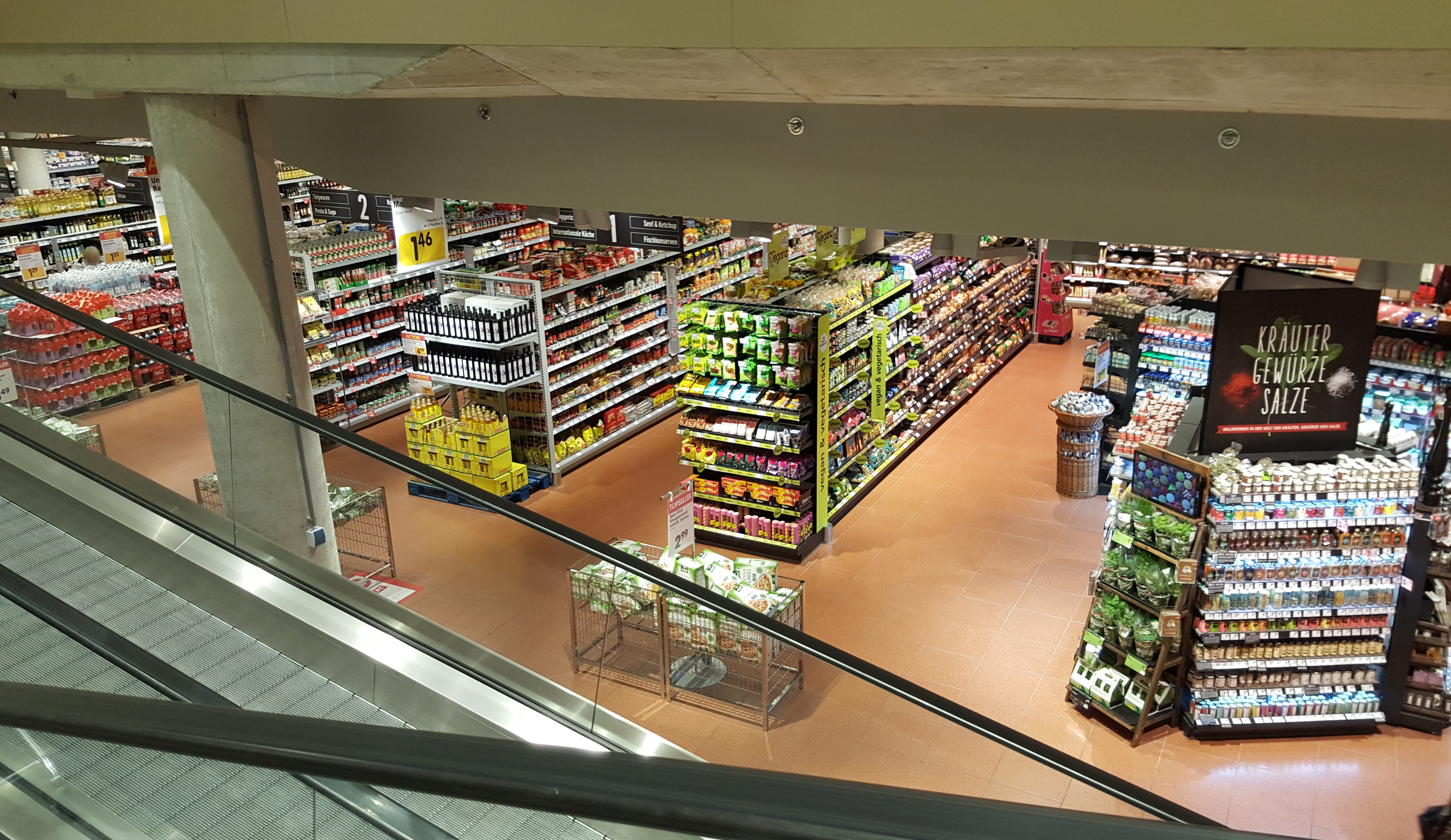
Hypermarket Interspar Austria in Vienna - Floridsdorf

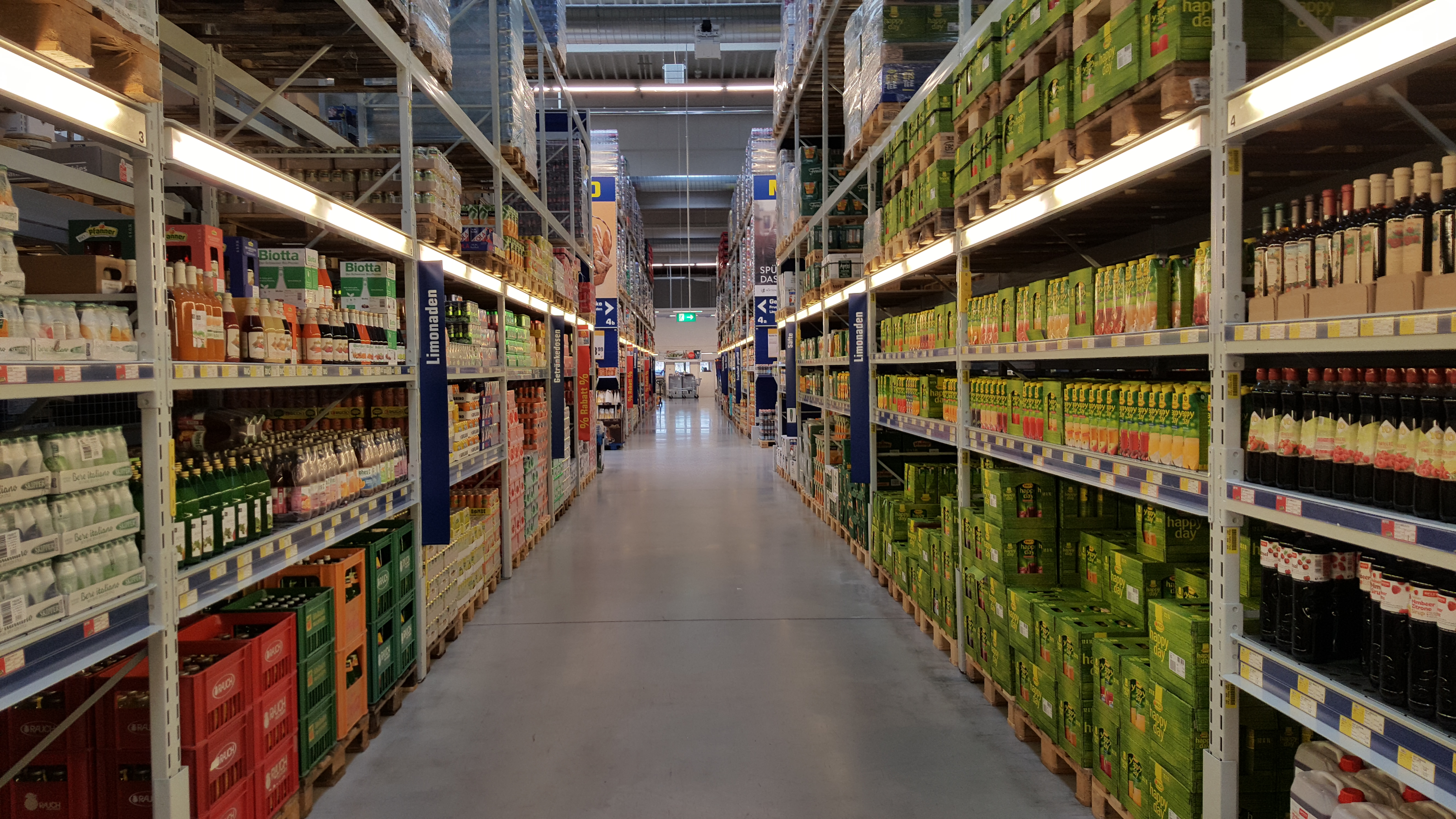
Metro Austria in Vienna - Simmering

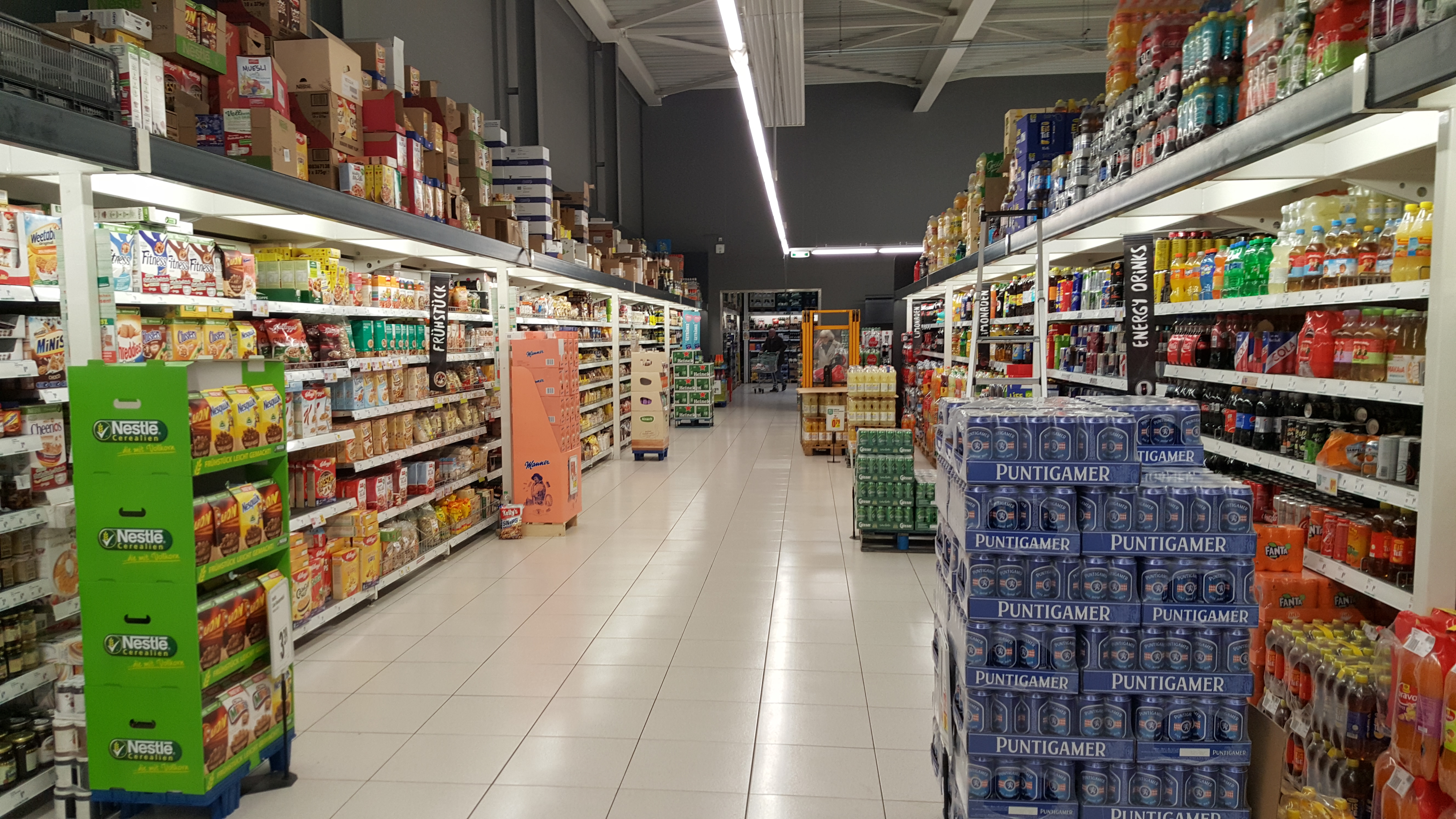
Billa Plus (former Merkur) Austria in Vienna - Floridsdorf

Name	Stores	Type of store	Owner headquarters	Parent
ADEG	~ 400	Regional supermarket	Austria	REWE Group
basic	2	Organic supermarket	Germany	TEGUT
Billa	1000+	Supermarket	Austria	REWE Group
Billa Plus	128	Hypermarket	Austria	REWE Group
Denn’s Biomarkt	27	Organic supermarket	Germany	Dennree Naturkost GmbH
Etsan	30	Supermarket, ethnic food	Austria	Macro Group Handels-GmbH
Hofer	~ 480	Discount	Germany	Aldi Süd
Lidl	200+	Discount	Germany	Lidl
Maximarkt	7	Hypermarket	Austria	Spar Österreich-Gruppe
Metro	12	Cash & carry	Germany	Metro Cash & Carry
MPreis	234	Supermarket	Austria	MPreis
Nah & Frisch	498	Regional supermarket	Switzerland	Markant (Handelsunternehmen)
Norma	21	Discount	Germany	Norma
Penny Markt	~ 300	Discount	Germany	Penny (supermarket); REWE Group
Spar Eurospar Interspar Spar Gourmet	1620	Supermarket, hypermarket	Austria (franchisee) Netherlands (franchisor)	Spar Österreich-Gruppe (franchisee) Spar (franchisor)
Sutterlüty	23	Supermarket	Austria	Sutterlüty Handels GmbH
Unimarkt	~~130~~closed in 2025	Supermarket	Austria	Unimarkt
