= Penny Market XXL =

Romanian supermarket chain

Penny Market XXL logo

XXL Mega Discount old logo

Penny Market XXL and XXL Mega Discount were a discount Romanian supermarket chain owned by Rewe Group, which also operated the Billa, Penny Market and Selgros in Romania. As opposed to Billa, XXL stores were generally larger and geared towards low-income and middle-income consumers. On 10 January 2013, Penny Market XXL was renamed into XXL Mega Discount, containing the slogan Uriașul prețurilor mici! The XXL Mega Discount stores were closed on 31 December 2016, and reopened on the first days of 2017. Not only that, Rewe started modernizing the XXL Mega Discount stores in June of the aforementioned year, converting them into the name Penny Market.

== See also ==
- REWE Group
- Billa
- Penny Market
- Selgros
