= Discount store =

Retail store model for low prices

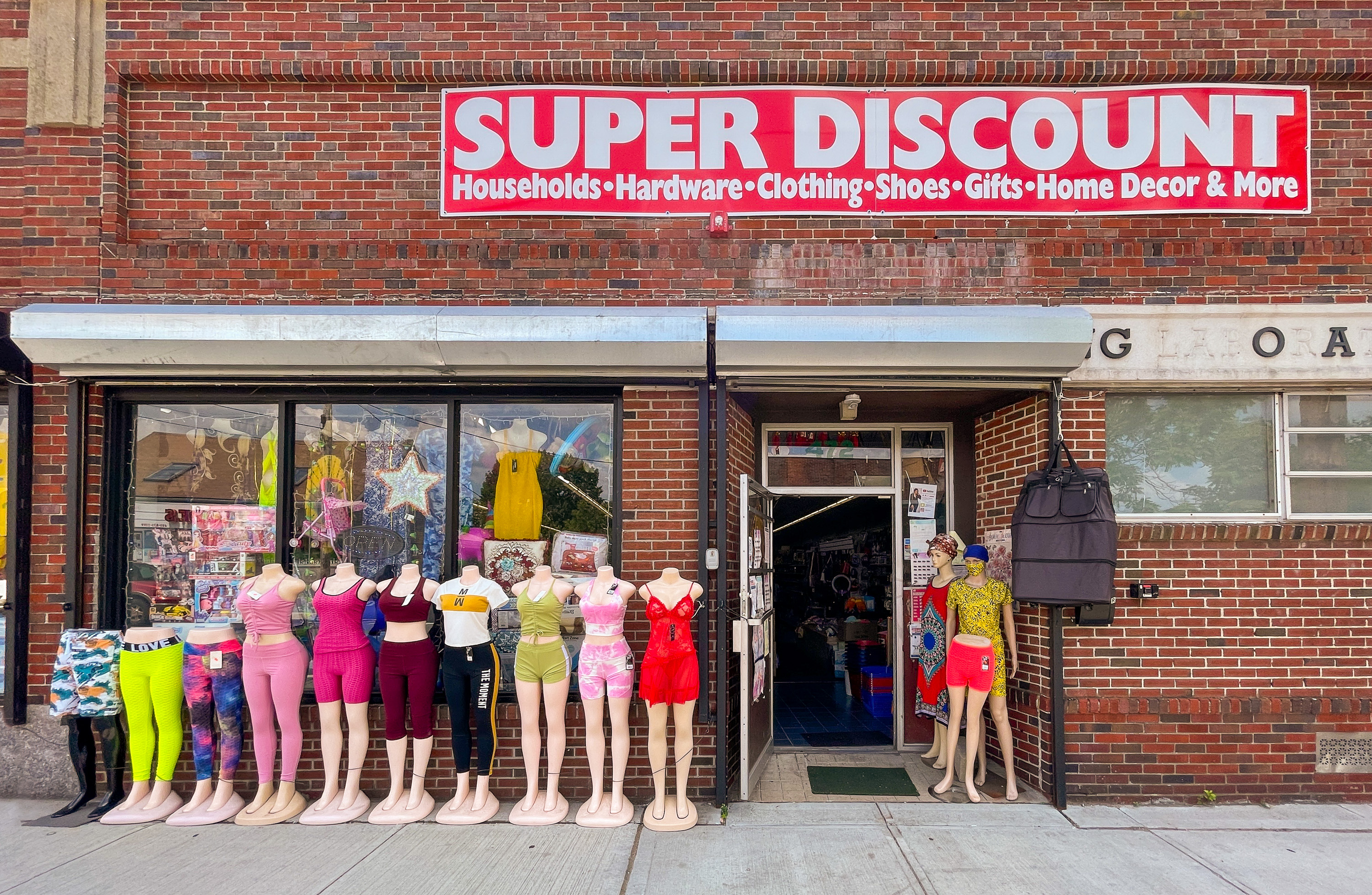
An American discount store uses a colorful display of clothing on mannequins to attract customers.

Discount stores are retail establishments that sell products at prices lower than the standard or recommended retail price. Discounters rely on bulk purchasing and efficient distribution to keep down costs. They include hypermarkets, "category killer" big box stores, warehouse club stores, discount grocery stores, dollar stores and variety stores.

== Business model ==
Some items are offered at a considerable discount over other retailers, whereas others are at the same price point. There are two ways discount stores make a profit:

- Buying and selling vast amounts of goods at heavily discounted prices provides a small profit margin multiplied by the sales volume.
- Pricing many items at prices that are higher than regular retailers. These goods are commonly bought by consumers who perceive them to be bargains based on the heavy discounts on other items in the store. In the case of fixed price-point retailers, this can be achieved by reducing the package size.

Discount stores with single price points buy products to fit those price points (while making a profit) that are:

- generic brands or private labels, often specially manufactured using cheaper materials and processes than usual.
- available through the grey market.
- bought at a closeout sale, such as seasonal or promotional goods or bankruptcy stock.
- sold in smaller unit sizes than elsewhere.

== Types ==
Discount stores can be categorized into several types, which vary by country; the following examples focus on the United States.

=== Hypermarkets (superstores) ===
Discount superstores such as Walmart or Target sell general merchandise in a big-box store; many have a full grocery selection and are thus hypermarkets, though that term is not generally used in North America. In the 1960s and 1970s the term "discount department store" was used, and chains such as Kmart, Zodys and TG&Y billed themselves as such. The term "discount department store" or "off-price department store" is sometimes applied to big-box discount retailers of apparel and home goods, such as Ross Dress for Less, Marshalls, TJ Maxx, and Burlington.

=== Category killers ===
So-called category killer stores, specialize in one type of merchandise and sell it in big-box stores. Examples include:

- Apparel: Ross Dress for Less, Marshalls, Burlington, etc.
- Pet supplies: Petco, PetSmart
- Home furnishings and accessories: Big Lots, HomeGoods
- Office supplies: Staples, Office Depot, OfficeMax

=== Warehouse clubs ===
When membership is required, discount superstores are known as warehouse clubs, and often require purchases of larger sizes or quantities of goods than a regular superstore. The main national chains, both of which have operations outside the U.S., are Costco and Sam's Club.

=== Discount grocery store ===
Major discount grocery store retail chains in the U.S. include Aldi, Lidl, Save-A-Lot and Grocery Outlet. As of 2025, Aldi operates around 6,600 stores and Lidl operates around 12,600 stores worldwide.

=== Variety stores, dollar stores, five and dimes ===
Variety stores are stores which sell goods at a single or low fixed price point. In the United States, they are commonly known as dollar stores. During the early and mid-twentieth century they were commonly known as "five and dimes" or "dime stores". Stores of the main chains, Woolworth's, J. J. Newberry and S. S. Kresge, lined the shopping streets of U.S. downtowns and suburbs, and starting in the 1950s they also opened branches in shopping malls. These chains originally sold items for 5, 10 or 25 cents, but many later moved to a model with flexible price points, with a variety of general merchandise at discounted prices, in formats smaller than today's discount superstores.

== History ==
=== United States ===
During the period from the 1950s to the late 1980s, discount stores were more popular than the average supermarket or department store in the United States. There were hundreds of discount stores in operation, with their most successful period occurring during the mid-1960s in the U.S. with discount store chains such as Kmart, Ames, Two Guys, Gibson's Discount Center, E. J. Korvette, Mammoth Mart, Fisher's Big Wheel, Zayre, Bradlees, Caldor, Jamesway, Howard Brothers Discount Stores, Kuhn's-Big K (sold to Walmart in 1981), TG&Y and Woolco (closed in 1983, part sold to Wal-Mart) among others.

Walmart, Kmart, and Target all opened their first locations in 1962. Kmart was a venture of S. S. Kresge Company that was a major operator of dime stores. Other retail companies branched out into the discount store business around that time as adjuncts to their older store concepts. As examples, Woolworth opened a Woolco chain (also in 1962); Montgomery Ward opened Jefferson Ward; Chicago-based Jewel-Osco launched Turn Style; and Central Indiana-based L. S. Ayres created Ayr-Way. J. C. Penney opened discount stores called Treasure Island or The Treasury; Sheboygan, Wisconsin based H. C. Prange Co. opened a chain of discount stores called Prange Way, and Atlanta-based Rich's owned discount stores called Richway.

During the late 1970s and the 1980s, these chains typically were either shut down or sold to a larger competitor. Kmart and Target themselves are examples of adjuncts, although their growth prompted their respective parent companies to abandon their older concepts (the S. S. Kresge five and dime store disappeared, while the Dayton-Hudson Corporation eventually divested itself of its department store holdings and renamed itself Target Corporation).

In the United States, discount stores had 42% of the overall retail market share in 1987; in 2010, they had 87%.

Many of the major discounters now operate "supercenters", which adds a full-service grocery store to the traditional format. The Meijer chain in the Midwest consists entirely of supercenters, while Wal-Mart and Target have focused on the format as of the 1990s as a key to their continued growth. Although discount stores and department stores have different retailing goals and different markets, a recent development in retailing is the "discount department store", such as Sears Essentials, which is a combination of the Kmart and Sears formats, after the companies' merger as Sears Holdings Corporation.

=== Canada ===
Woolworths entered Canada in the 1920s, the stores were converted to the Foot Locker, Champs Sports and other stores in 1994. Kresge's, a competitor to Woolworth's entered the Canadian market in 1929.

Zellers was founded in 1931, and was acquired by the Hudson's Bay Company in 1978. Giant Tiger opened its first store in Ottawa in 1961, modeled on Woolworths. Winners was founded in 1982 in Toronto, and sells off-price brand clothing. Costco entered Canada in 1986. In 1990, the American chain Walmart purchased the Woolco chain in Canada and converted the stores into Walmarts. Dollarama was founded in Quebec in 1992. In 1998, Zellers bought out Kmart Canada, taking over its stores.

In 2011, Marshalls, owned by the American TJX Companies, entered Canada, and Zellers sold most of its stores to Target. Target Canada filed for bankruptcy in 2015, selling its stores to Walmart, Lowe's and Canadian Tire.

In 2016, the Hudson's Bay Company started opening Saks Off 5th locations to sell off-price brands. American off-price chain Nordstrom Rack opened its first Canadian location in Vaughan Mills in 2018.

- Food Basics discount supermarket.
- No frills discount supermarket.

== Multinationals ==
- Aldi
- BİM
- Costco
- Daiso
- Dia (supermarket chain)
- Lidl
- Netto (store)
- Penny
- TJX Companies
- Usave
- Walmart

== By country ==
Outside the United States and Canada, the main discount store chains listed by country are as follows:

=== Albania ===
- Diambe Market

=== Angola ===
- Usave

=== Argentina ===
- Dia (supermarket chain)

=== Australia ===
- Aldi
- Big W owned by Woolworths Group
- Kmart, Target owned by Wesfarmers
- Harris Scarfe owned by Spotlight Group
- The Reject Shop
- Choice (Formerly Cheap as Chips), Dollars and Sense, Shiploads, Red Dot

=== Austria ===
- Lidl
- Hofer
- Penny

=== Belgium ===
- Aldi
- Lidl

=== Bosnia and Herzegovina ===
- Lidl

=== Botswana ===
- Usave

=== Brazil ===
- Dia (supermarket chain)

=== Bulgaria ===
- Lidl
- Kam Market

=== Chile ===
- Superbodega acuenta

=== China ===
- Aldi

=== Colombia ===
- Tiendas D1
- ARA (Jerónimo Martins)
- Dollarcity
- Ísimo, formerly Justo Y Bueno

=== Costa Rica ===
- Pali
- Pequeno Mundo

=== Croatia ===
- Eurospin
- Lidl

=== Cyprus ===
- Lidl

=== Czechia ===
- Lidl

=== Denmark ===
- Aldi
- Lidl
- REMA 1000

=== Ecuador ===
- Tiendas Tuti

=== Egypt ===
- BIM

=== El Salvador ===
- Despensa Familiar
- Dollar City

=== Estonia ===
- Lidl

=== Eswatini ===
- Usave
- Boxer superstores

=== Finland ===
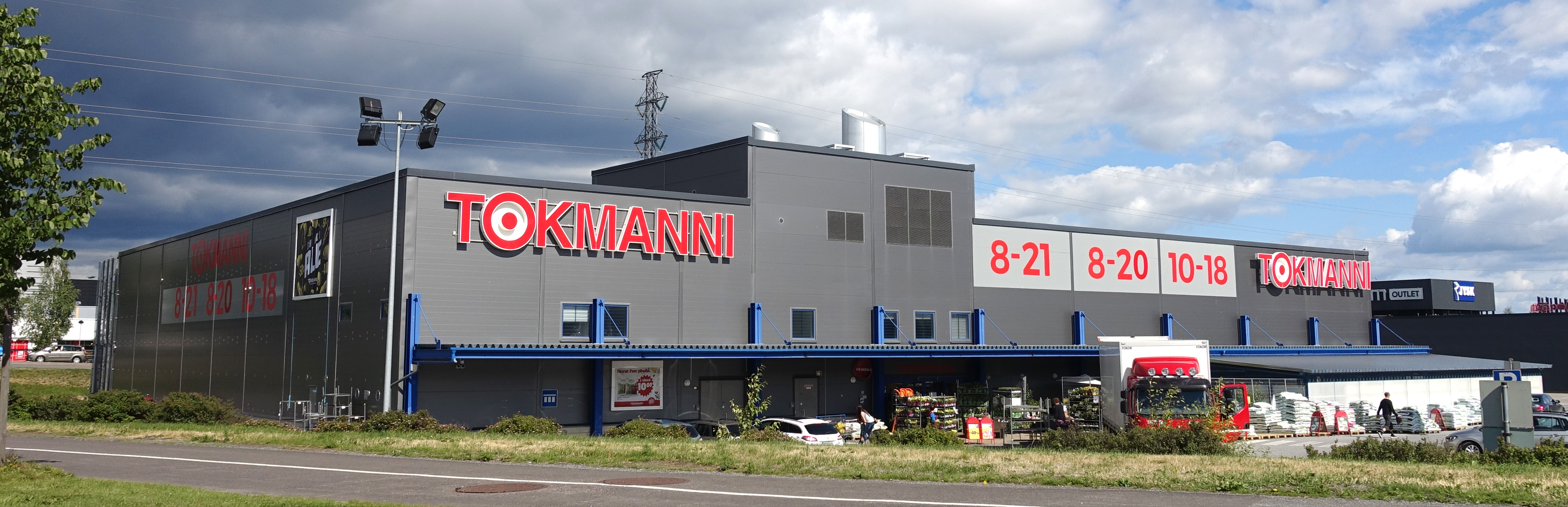
Tokmanni in Tampere, Finland

- Lidl
- Halpa Halli
- Kärkkäinen
- Puuilo
- Tokmanni

=== Germany ===
- Aldi
- Lidl
- Netto Marken-Discount
- Netto (store)
- Norma
- Penny

=== Greece ===
- Lidl
- Discount Markt

=== Guatemala ===
- Super del Barrio
- Despensa Familiar
- Dollar City
- Econo Super

=== Honduras ===
- Despensa Familiar

=== Hungary ===
- Aldi
- Lidl

=== Ireland ===
- Aldi
- Lidl

=== Italy ===
Italy has numerous discount supermarkets, including Lidl and EuroSpin, the chains with the largest number of stores, and Aldi, Discount Dial, Dpiù, MD Discount, Penny, Todis and Tuodì.

=== Japan ===
Japan has numerous discount stores, including Costco, Daiso, Don Quijote (store) and The Price (owned by Ito Yokado).

=== Kenya ===
- Jaza Discount

=== Latvia ===
- Lidl

=== Lesotho ===
- Usave

=== Lithuania ===
- Lidl

=== Luxembourg ===
- Aldi
- Lidl

=== Malaysia ===
- Eco-shop
- Mr Dollar

=== Malta ===
- Eurospin
- Lidl

=== Malawi ===
- Usave

=== Mexico ===
- Tiendas Neto
- Tiendas 3B
- Superissste
- Waldo's
- Bodega Aurrera
- PesoRama (JOi Dollar Plus stores)

=== Morocco ===
- BIM

=== Mozambique ===
- Usave

=== Namibia ===
- Usave

=== Netherlands ===
Action, Euroland, Solow, Big Bazar and Zeeman. In addition, the German discount supermarkets Lidl and Aldi both operate in the country.

=== New Zealand ===
- PAKnSAVE

=== Nicaragua ===
- Despensa Familiar

=== North Macedonia ===
- KAM Market
- Market Kipper
- Stokomak
- Lidi

=== Norway ===
- REMA 1000

=== Peru ===
- Tiendas Mass
- Hiperbodegas Precio Uno
- DollarCity

=== Philippines ===
- Dali Everyday Grocery
- O!Save

=== Poland ===
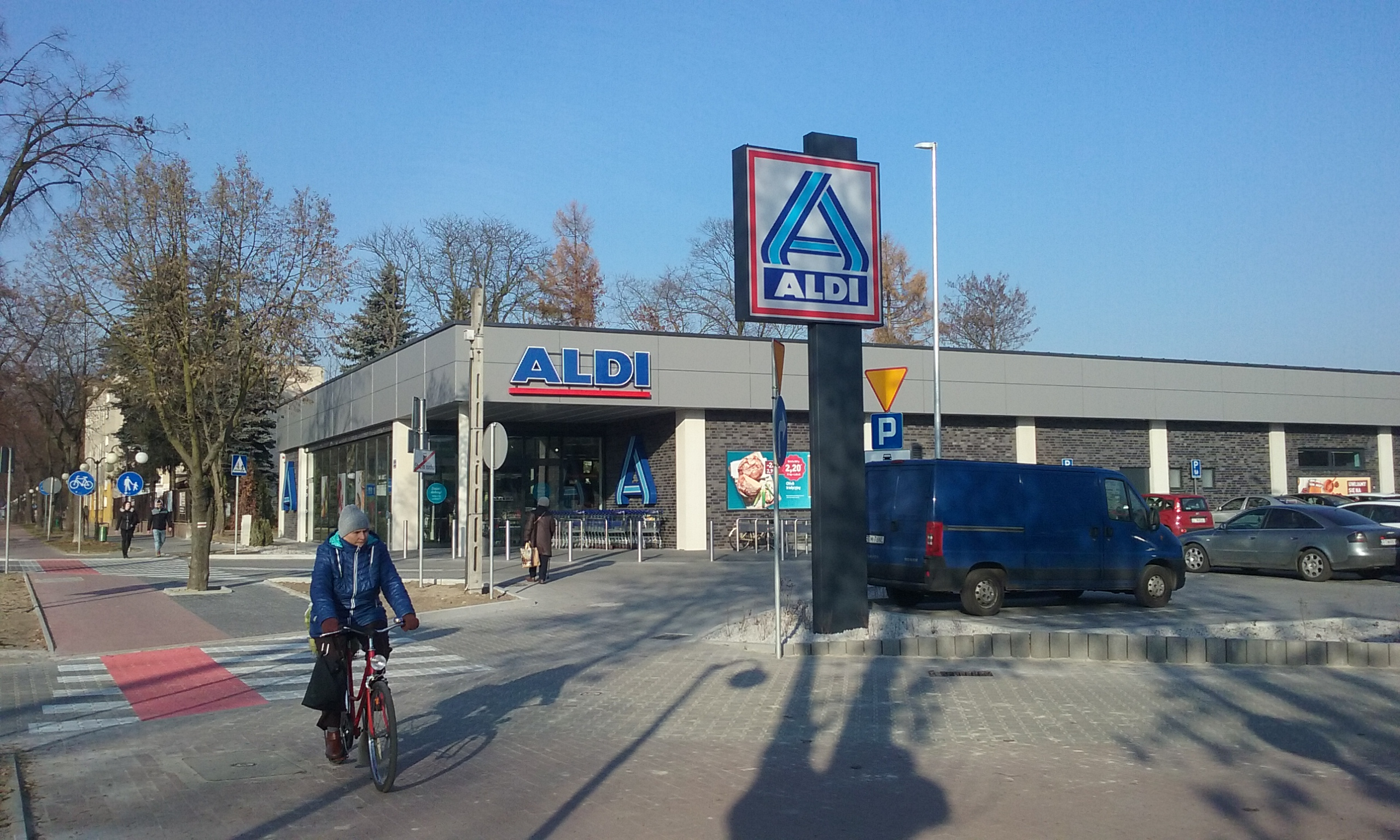
ALDI in Tomaszów Mazowiecki, Poland

Discount supermarkets cover about 30% of food sales in Poland. Main chains include Biedronka, Lidl, Netto, and Aldi.

=== Portugal ===
- Aldi
- Lidl
- Minipreço / Dia (supermarket chain)
- Plus sold to Jerónimo Martins

=== Panama ===
- El Machetazo

=== Romania ===
- Lidl
- Penny

=== Russia ===
- 365+
- Chizhik
- Dobrocen
- Dixy
- Fix Price
- Moya Tsena
- Nizkotsen
- Pervy Vybor
- Pobeda
- Svetofor
  - Mayak (larger stores)

==== Former ====
- Atac
- Holdi
- Kopeyka

=== Serbia ===
- Lidl
- Svetofor
- Super Discount
- Leon Discount

=== Slovakia ===
- Lidl

=== Slovenia ===
- Aldi
- Eurospin
- Lidl

=== South Africa ===
- Wellsave
- Devland Hyper
- Foodeez
- Looters Slashed price warehouse
- Usave
- Boxer Superstores
- Deals Superstores

=== Spain ===
- Dia (supermarket chain)
- Aldi
- Lidl
- Mere

=== Sweden ===
- Biltema
- DollarStore owned by Tokmanni
- Lidl
- Rusta
- ÖoB

=== Switzerland ===
- Aldi
- Lidl
- Denner

=== Turkey ===
- A101
- BİM
- File owned by BİM
- Hakmar Express owned by Hakmar
- Şok owned by Yıldız Holding

=== Ukraine ===
- ATB
- Aurora (Аврора)

=== United Kingdom ===
- Aldi
- B & M
- Farmfoods
- Home Bargains
- Lidl
- Poundland
- Poundstretcher

=== Venezuela ===
- Tiendas Ovejita
- Tiendas Daka

== See also ==
- Charity shop
- Dollar store (five and dime, variety store)
- Everyday low price
- Flea market
- Garage sale
- Hypermarket
- Jumble sale
- No frills
- Types of retail outlets
- Warehouse club
