= Karl Wlaschek =

Austrian businessman (1917–2015)

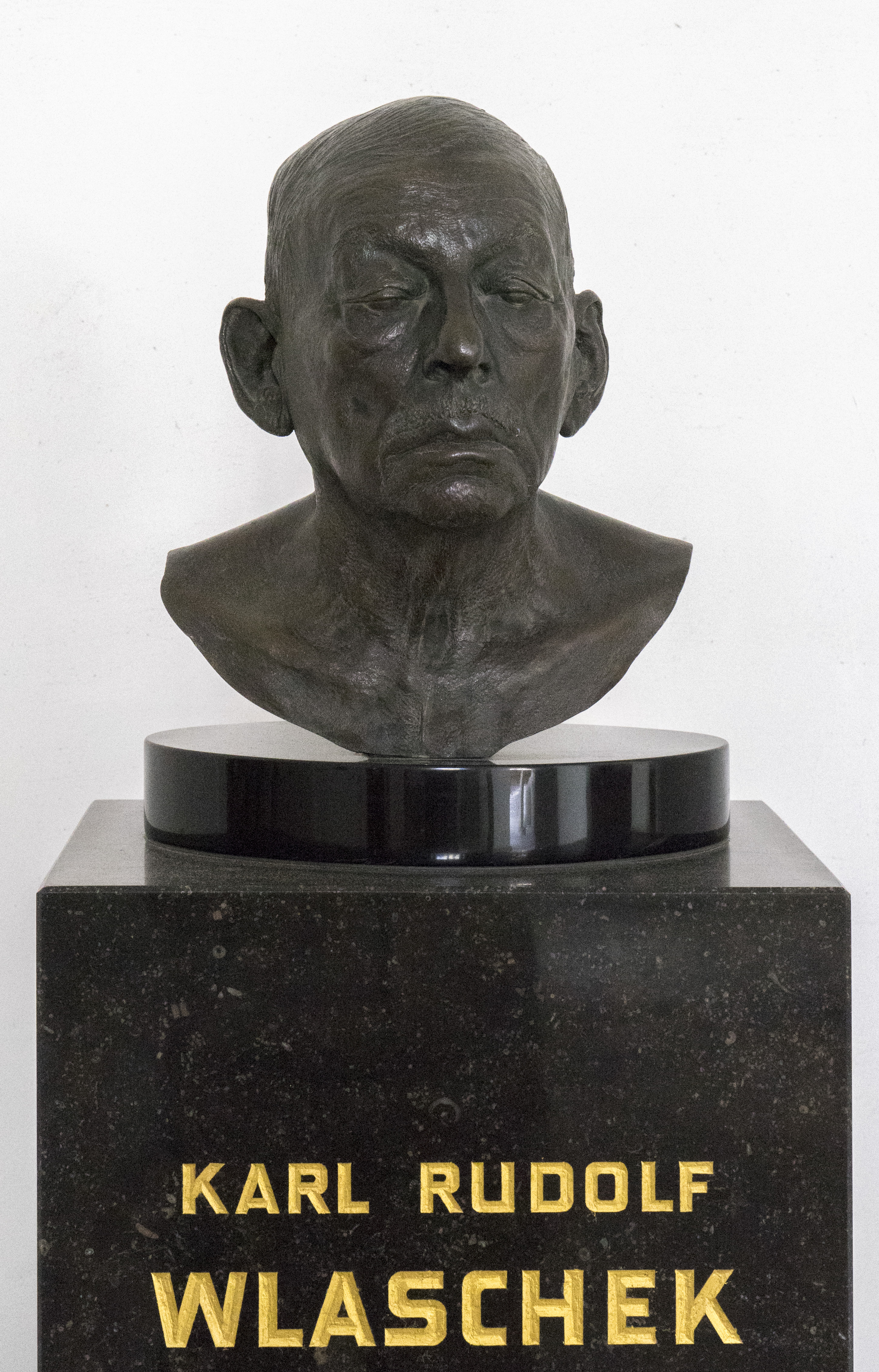
- Bust in the entrance of Palais Kinsky
- Born: 4 August 1917; Vienna, Austria
- Died: 31 May 2015 (aged 97); Graz, Austria
- Occupation(s): Founder, Billa
- Children: 2

Karl Wlaschek (4 August 1917 – 31 May 2015) was the founder of the Austrian supermarket chain Billa. According to the magazine Trend, Wlaschek was one of the five richest Austrians. In 1996 he sold Billa for Euro 1.1 billion.

== Early life ==
Wlaschek studied chemistry at TU Wien until he was he was conscripted in 1938, serving in France and the Soviet Union. After World War II, he worked as a bar pianist and bandleader under the pseudonym "Charly Walker". He wanted to open his own dance cafe, but at the time did not have the financial means to do so.

== Career ==
In 1953, Karl Wlaschek opened a perfumery in the Margareten district of Vienna and offered brand-name products at discount prices. Warenhandel Karl Wlaschek (WKW) grew steadily and by 1960 already comprised 45 branches in Austria. Wlaschek transferred the concept to the grocery business, introduced the self-service system and named his stores BILLA (for "Billiger Laden" – "Cheap Shop") in 1961.

In the 1990s, the company expanded abroad as Eurobilla. In 1996, Wlaschek sold the group to the German REWE Group for EUR 1.1 billion. The merger was notified to the European Commission in July 1996 and approved in August.

After failing to get in on the privatization of Creditanstalt (then the second largest bank in Austria), Wlaschek began investing his wealth in real estate. He owned eight palaces in the center of Vienna (including Kinsky, Ferstel, and Harrach), but also the Andromeda Tower and the Ares Tower (both part of Donau City), the former building of the Vienna Stock Exchange, and numerous other buildings in the city center.

In 2015, Forbes estimated his fortune at USD 4.2 billion.

== Personal life ==
He lived in Vienna with his fifth wife, whom he had married in 2012. He had two children.

In November 2005, Adolf Haslinger, former rector of the University of Salzburg and a long-standing friend of Wlaschek, published an authorized biography.

== Awards and honors ==
- 1989: Golden Decoration of Honor for Services to the State of Vienna
- 1993: Grand Decoration of Honor in Gold for Services to the Republic of Austria
- 1997: trend magazine’s "Man of the Year" Award
- 2004: Gold Medal of Honor of the City of Vienna
- 2008: Grand Decoration of Honor in Silver with Star for Services to the Republic of Austria

== See also ==
- The World's Billionaires
- Liste der reichsten Österreicher
