= OOB =

OOB may refer to:

== Technology ==
- Out-of-bag error, a method of measuring prediction error
- Out-of-band data, data transferred through a network that is independent from the main data stream
- Out-of-band management, using a dedicated management channel in computer networking
- Out of the box (feature), a product that is usable immediately

== Other uses ==
- Out of bounds, a state of violating boundary rules in sports
- ÖoB, a Swedish discount chain
- Old Orchard Beach, Maine, a US seaside resort town
- Oob (Dragon Ball), a fictional character in Dragon Ball
- Off Our Backs, a former US feminist periodical
- Order of battle, a listing of military units

== See also ==
- OOBE (disambiguation)
- Out of bounds (disambiguation)
