= Der Penny-Markt auf der Reeperbahn =

2007 TV documentary

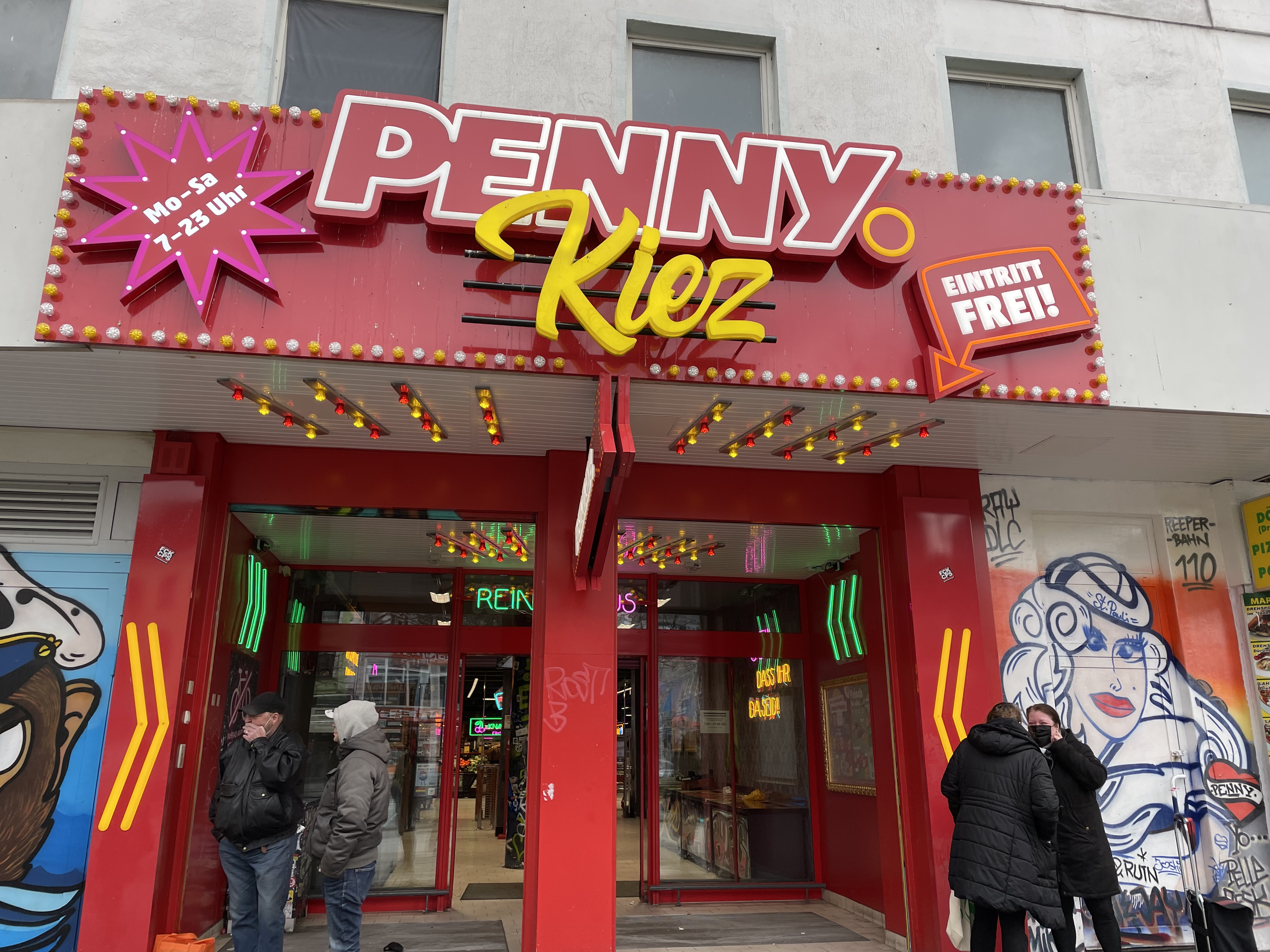
- Genre: Documentary series
- Directed by: Markus Grün
- Country of origin: Germany
- Original language: German
- No. of episodes: 5

Production
- Production company: Spiegel TV

Original release
- Network: Sat.1
- Release: January 2007

Der Penny-Markt auf der Reeperbahn (English: The Penny Market on the Reeperbahn) is a German documentary series by Markus Grün for Spiegel TV on the Penny Market on the Reeperbahn in Hamburg.

== Plot ==
The documentary is about the Penny market in St. Pauli, which was open daily until 11 p.m. Spiegel TV author Markus Grün documents the daily routine there, which was characterized by theft, drunkards, poverty and a lot of chaos.

== Production ==
The four-part documentary was shot in 2006 and first broadcast in January 2007 as part of the Spiegel TV on Sat.1. SpiegelTV published this again in 2020 on the web video portal YouTube under the format Spiegel-TV-Classics. There, the documentary became very popular, with some parts of the video even being shared as memes, and it was decided that the series should be continued. On the night of November 23 to 24, 2021, the sequel was broadcast on Sat. 1.

== Criticism ==
The portrayals of intoxicated alcoholics and homeless people with the narrator's ironic comments have been criticized. Matthias Dell from Deutschlandfunk compared the documentary series with a "90-minute meme".
