= Billa (supermarket) =

Austrian multinational supermarket chain in Central, Eastern and Southeastern Europe

Billa AG
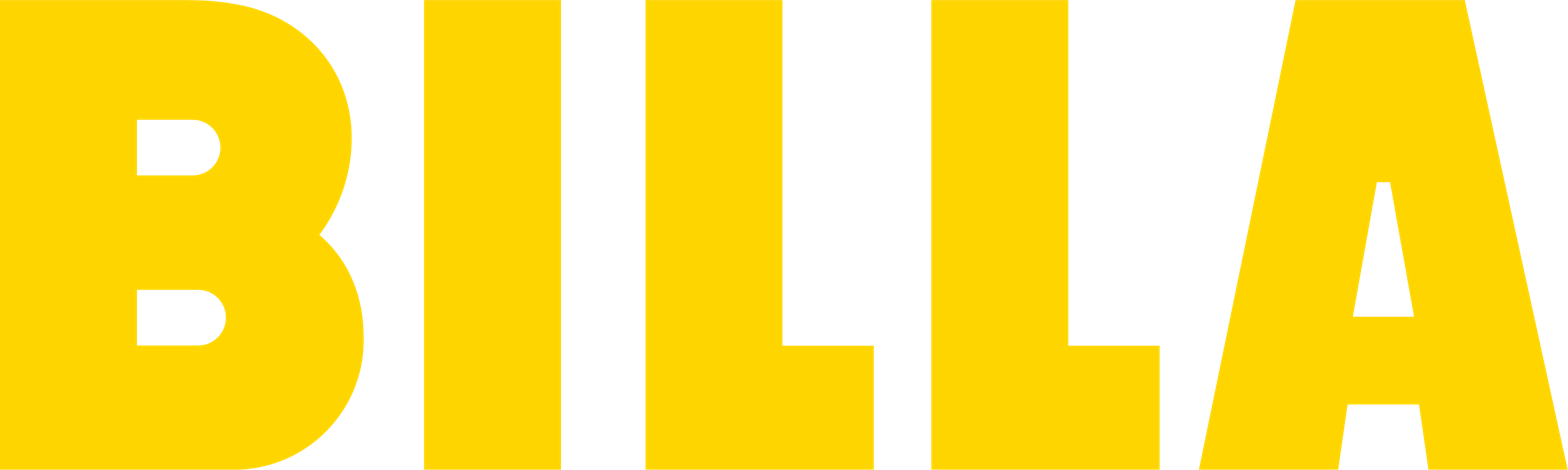
- Type: Private
- Industry: Retail
- Founded: 1953; 73 years ago
- Headquarters: Wiener Neudorf, Lower Austria, Austria
- Number of locations: 3,645 stores (2014)
- Key people: Robert Nagele, Elke Wilgmann
- Products: Supermarkets
- Revenue: ▲€ 13.02 billion (2014)
- Owner: REWE International AG
- Number of employees: 76,174 (2014)
- Website: www.billa.at

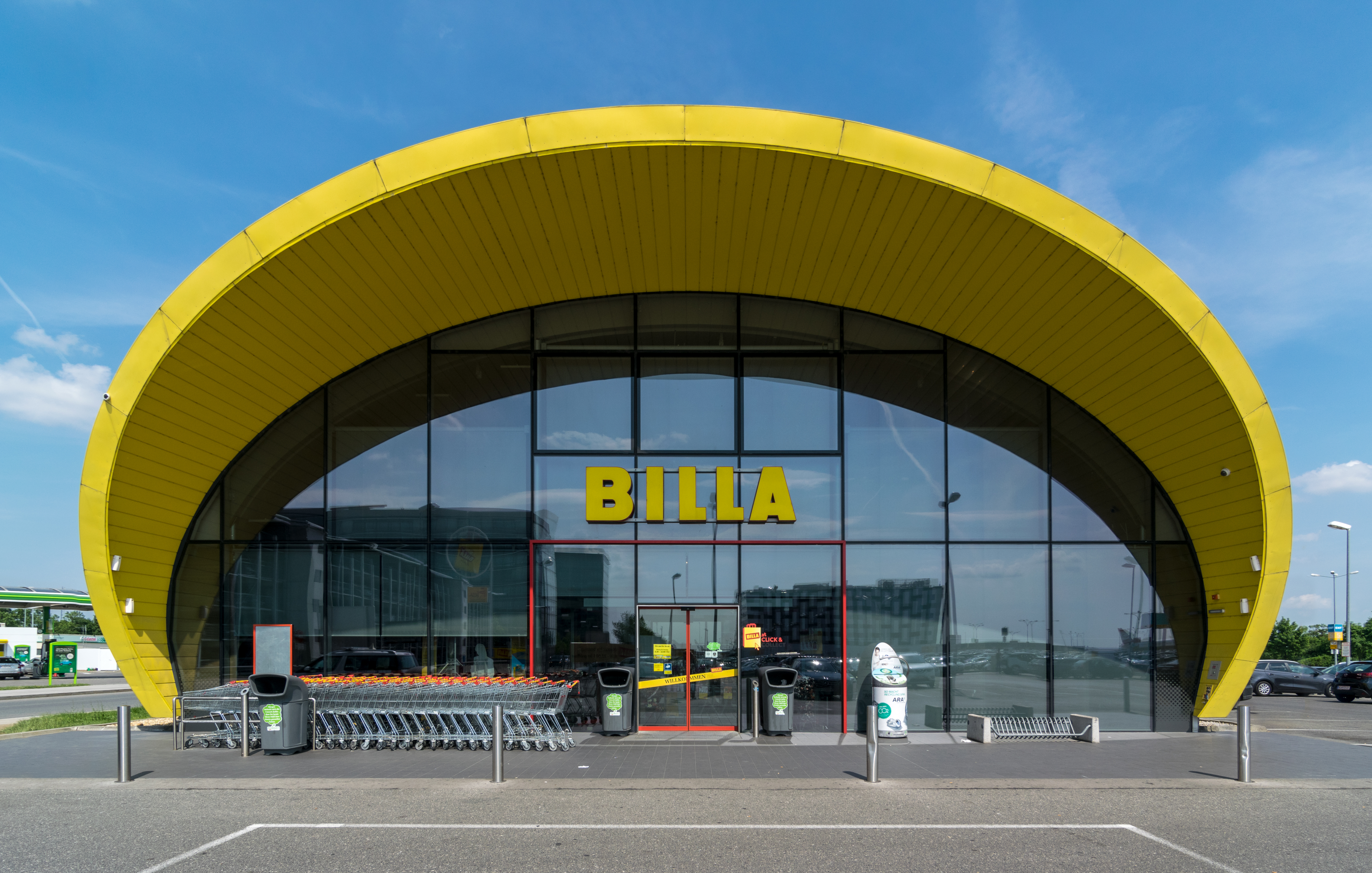
Billa at Vienna airport

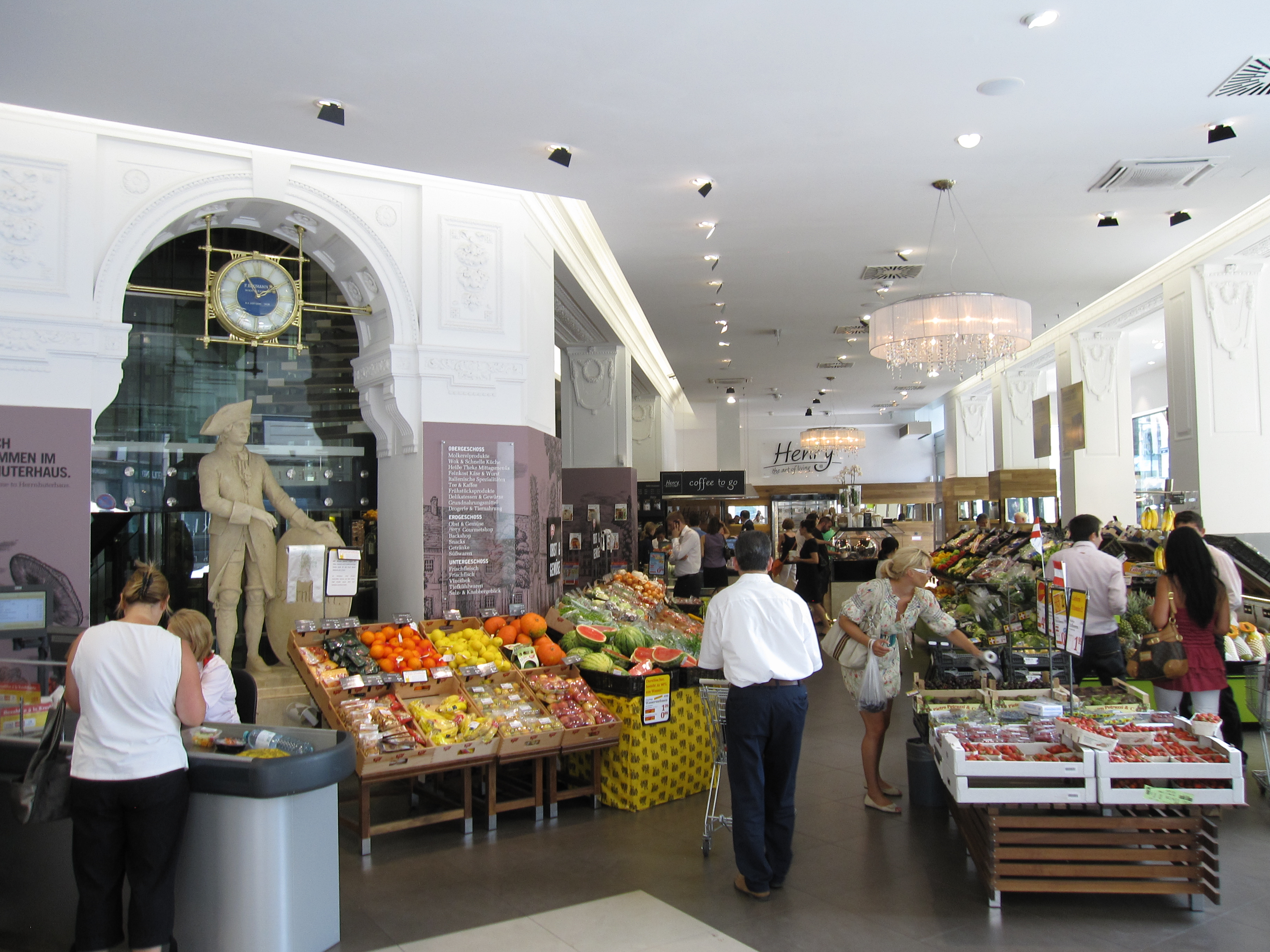
Billa flagship store in Vienna

BILLA (German pronunciation: [ˈbɪla]) is an Austrian supermarket chain that operates in Central, Eastern and Southeast Europe. The company was founded by Karl Wlaschek in 1953. He sold his controlling interest to Germany's REWE Group in 1996.

== History ==
In 1953, Karl Wlaschek opened a discount perfume shop in the Vienna district of Margareten called WKW (Warenhandel Karl Wlaschek, translatable as Karl Wlaschek Trading). By 1960 WKW had 45 stores in Austria. In 1961 the chain was renamed Billa, a portmanteau of "billiger Laden", German for 'cheap shop', and it started selling food and then went over to self-service. In 1965 the company had grown to 109 stores. REWE Group acquired Billa in 1996.

== Present locations ==
Billa operates stores in four European countries:

Country	No. of stores
Austria	1,102
Czech Republic	271
Bulgaria	173
Slovakia	145

=== Austria ===
Austria is the chain's home market. As of March 2019, Billa had 1,069 stores in the country, second only to SPAR's 1,538.

=== Czech Republic ===
The first Billa supermarket in the Czech Republic was opened on Stránského Street, Brno, on 26 October 1991. The company has 271 stores in the country and employs over 6,000 staff. Billa stores have an average sales area of 900 m^{2}.

=== Slovakia ===
Billa opened its first store in Slovakia in 1993.

=== Bulgaria ===
The company opened its first supermarket in Bulgaria in 2000, and has since then expanded to cover 54 Bulgarian cities, operating a total of 173 supermarkets as of April 2026.

== Former locations ==
Billa operated in other countries in the past.

Country	No. of stores	Sold to	Year sold
Hungary	21	Spar	2002
Poland	14	E.Leclerc	2009
Italy	136	Carrefour (53); Conad (50) others (33)	2014
Romania	86	Carrefour	2015
Croatia	62	Spar	2016
Ukraine	35	Novus	2020
Russia	161	Lenta	2021

=== Russia ===
The first Billa supermarket in Russia opened in 2004. In 2008, the network for the first time went outside of Moscow. In the same year, thirteen Yum-Yum supermarkets in Moscow were purchased.

In 2012, Billa bought the Russian supermarket chain Citistor (part of the former Ramstor chain).

Since 2008, all new Rewe Group stores in Russia in the "supermarket" format have been opened not under the Billa brand, but under the Biop (Billa Operations) brand. The reason is that only Billa Russia LLC had the right to develop the Billa brand in Russia, but one of the partners (22.5%)—the Russian holding "Marta"—since the end of 2008 stopped investing in the development of the company due to the beginning of the bankruptcy procedure. In June 2010, this package was purchased from "Marta".

On January 27, 2011, the official renaming of all the stores of the Biop chain to the Bill stores took place. In 2018, 151 Billa stores were opened in Russia. In 2021, before the deal with Lenta, there were 161 stores operating across Russia mostly in Moscow and surrounding cities. The holding company Lenta LLC announced on May 18 that it had struck a deal to acquire the supermarkets business of Billa Russia GmbH for 215 millions € in cash.

=== Ukraine ===
The first BILLA supermarket in Ukraine was opened on February 3, 2000, in Kyiv. Over the next 14 years, the company developed actively — in 2014, the number of its stores reached 39. BILLA supermarkets were represented in 16 cities in 9 regions of the country.

Since 2015, the number of supermarkets has started to decrease. In June 2017, the company announced the sale of 9 of its stores in the regions at once. As of September 2017, the chain of supermarkets of the Austrian concern had decreased to 17 supermarkets, of which 12 were in Kyiv and the Kyiv region, two each in Dnipro and Odesa, and 1 in Zhytomyr.

In March 2019, there were 30 BILLA supermarkets in Ukraine.

On September 16, 2020, it became known that the Austrian company "Rewe International AG" sold the Ukrainian chain of supermarkets to the Lithuanian company Consul Trade House UAB, the founder of Novus Ukraine LLC.

== See also ==
- List of supermarkets
- Selgros
- XXL
