= Tokmanni =

Finnish retail chain

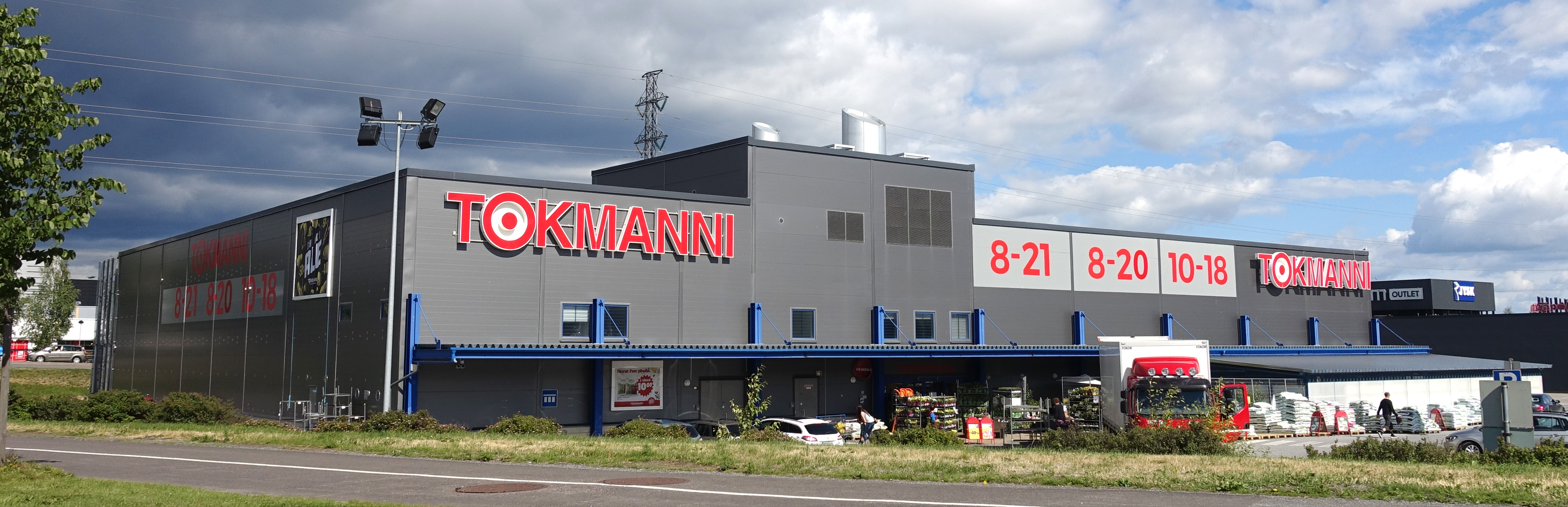
- Tokmanni in Tampere
- Type: Retail company
- Founded: 1989; 37 years ago
- Headquarters: Mäntsälä, Finland
- Key people: Sampo Päällysaho (CEO)
- Number of employees: 3,415 (2018)
- Website: https://www.tokmanni.fi/

Tokmanni Group Oyj is a Finnish retail chain, which is also the largest discount store chain in Finland in terms of net sales in 2019. Tokmanni is Finland's only nationwide discount store chain, and at the end of 2019 it had almost 200 stores around the country.

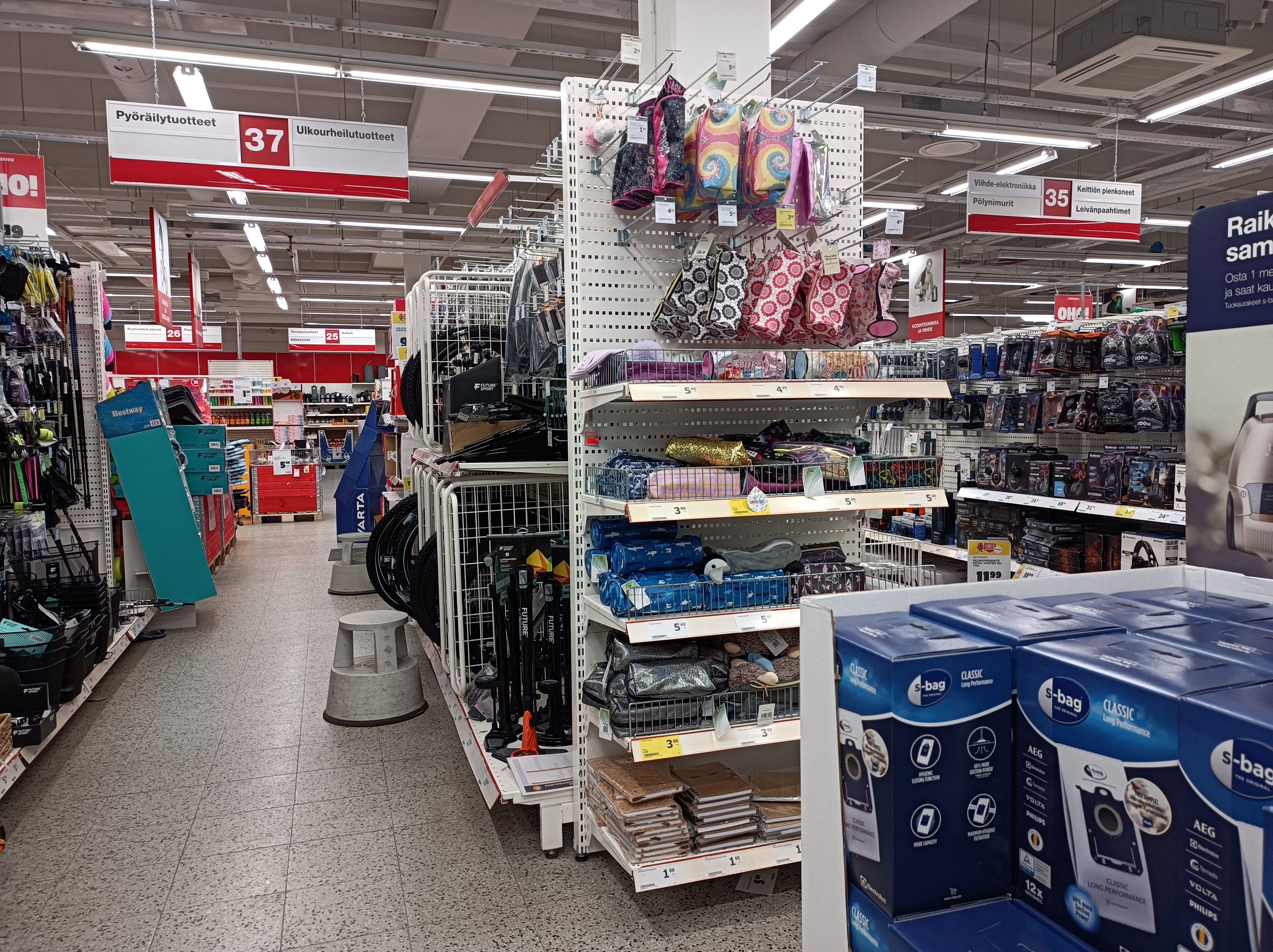
Tokmanni store in Siilinjärvi, Finland

== History ==
The oldest Finnish low price chain of those who later went into the ownership of Tokmanni, was Vapaa Valinta, founded in 1974 in Pirkkala of Juha and Paula Manninen.

The brothers Kyösti and Kari Kokkonen founded in 1989 a discount store in Joensuu under the name Okman, which was renamed to Tokmanni in 1991. Later, other low-price chains were founded in the 1970s, for example, Pirkko and Hannu Vuokila in 1978 founded Säästökuoppa in Oulu and Seppo and Paavo Saastamoinen in 1979 founded Maxi-Makasiini in Kajaani.

During the 1980s, low-cost companies were founded throughout Finland, such as Tarjoustalo in Hyvinkää in 1980 by Arja and Kari Hautanen, Säästöpörssi in Karis in 1985 by Timo and Tapio Halme and Robinhood in 1988 by Seppo and Jukka Saastamoinen in Kouvola.

In 1995, after a newspaper article about the Tokmanni retail chain, the Stockmann corporation contacted the Tokmanni chain by a letter asking them to renounce their name. The matter was resumed in November 1997, when the law firm representing Stockmann sent the Kakkonen brothes a new letter accusing the chain of mocking the brand name of Stockmann and demanding the chain remove the auxiliary brand name Kauppahuone Tokmanni from the company register and to stop using the brand name Tokmanni - Stockmann had also noticed that the chain had used the title "$tokmanni" in local advertising.

In their reply, the Tokmanni chain promised to stop using the term $tokmanni in their advertising but refused to renounce the Tokmanni brand name. According to Kakkonen, the name Tokmanni is clearly distinguished from Stockmann because of its meaning in Swedish: tok (meaning "crazy") and man (meaning "man"), which Kakkonen claimed referred to the chain's crazy low prices. In the end both the common court and the district court demanded the chain give up the $tokmanni term, but the remaining claims Stockmann had made were dismissed. In their judgement, the district court noted that Stockmann had inexplicably wasted time in pressing the charges after their first letter had been sent.

The economic crisis in Finland in the early 1990s then led to many bankruptcies in the retail industry. In 2004, the Finnish private equity fund CapMan entered as the principal owner of Tokmanni. Thereafter, a process started with many acquisitions and mergers of companies began to a nationally active retail chain, with the beginning of the acquisition of 35 stores in Vapaa Valinta chain.

During 2013 – 2015, Tokmanni implemented the brand harmonization, in which all the Group's stores were grouped under the Tokmanni brand.

According to the 2018 annual report, Tokmanni is still striving to expand its store network. Tokmanni has divided its product group into six different divisions, which are food, home cleaning and personal hygiene, clothing, tools and electronics, home interior and garden, and leisure and home technology. In addition to consumer goods, Tokmanni stores usually also sell dry food, but the 15 stores also include fresh food. The chain's own brands include Iisi groceries and Priima foods. The company's product range consists of international and domestic brands, its own so-called private label brands (Iisi and Priima) and non-branded products. Tokmanni has a joint sourcing company in Shanghai with the Norwegian discount store Europris.

Tokmanni's five largest shareholders on 30 September 2019 were Takoa Invest, Elo, Varma, Ilmarinen and OP Financial Group. About 30 percent of the shares are nominee-registered.

=== Cooperation with Spar ===
In January 2025, Tokmanni Oy entered into an agreement with Spar International. The license to operate the SPAR brand exclusively in Finland was granted to Tokmanni, an established variety discount retailer which will benefit from the scale and know-how of SPAR International, particularly in the area of grocery retailing. Tokmanni will focus on refining the SPAR concept to fit the Finnish market and offering customers a wide assortment of SPAR products.

In June 2025, the first Spar-branded food department was opened in the Tokmanni store of Ylöjärvi.

== See also ==
- Puuilo
