= Bon appétit Group =

Former Swiss food retail and wholesale group

- Formerly: Prodega AG; Bon Appetit Holding AG
- Company type: Joint-stock company
- Industry: Food wholesale and retail
- Founded: 1999 (merger of Bon Appetit Holding and Usego Hofer Curti)
- Fate: Acquired by Rewe (2003), renamed Rewe Schweiz and broken up
- Headquarters: Moosseedorf, Switzerland
- Key people: Beat Curti
- Products: Wholesale and retail groceries, cash-and-carry, catering supply
- Number of employees: ~5,000 (2002)

Bon appétit Group was a Swiss food wholesale and retail company that, with around 5,000 employees and consolidated sales of 3.17 billion francs in 2002, was the third-largest food trader in Switzerland after Migros and Coop. It was formed in 1999 through the merger of Bon Appetit Holding AG and Usego Hofer Curti AG, and owned brands including Pick Pay, Prodega, Howeg, Usego, Magro, Primo, and Visavis.

== Predecessors ==
=== Prodega and Bon Appetit Holding ===
The origins of the Bon Appetit holding lay in the mid-1960s, when the wholesale food operators Hans-Edi Curti and Pierre Grandjean joined with the wine and spirits wholesaler Heinz Wehrli to found Prodega AG (Pro Detailhandel und Gastgewerbe) as a cash-and-carry business. Prodega went public and expanded through acquisitions, and in 1998 it renamed itself Bon Appetit Holding AG.

=== Hofer & Curti ===
Hofer & Curti was a Swiss food wholesale company formed in 1977 through the merger of Hofer & Co. and Curti & Co. Hofer & Co. of Ebikon developed out of Baumann & Co., founded in 1883. Curti & Co. was based in the railway station district of Lucerne from 1902; its origins went back to the Martin Brunner colonial-goods business, owned by the Curti family from 1869. Curti & Co. expanded its activities through various retail acquisitions, including the wine-importing firm Bataillard & Cie and, in the 1970s, cash-and-carry outlets. From 1975 Beat Curti was the owner of the business. The interlocking Hofer & Curti group included several retail companies, and from 1996 it was called Usego Hofer Curti AG.

== Creation of the Bon appétit Group ==
In 1999 Usego Hofer Curti AG merged with Bon Appetit Holding to form the Bon appétit Group, led by Beat Curti. The group operated across retail, logistics, and catering, with the discount chain Pick Pay, the supermarket group Magro, the franchised Primo and Visavis corner stores, the Usego wholesale and logistics business, and the cash-and-carry and catering wholesalers Prodega, Growa, and Howeg. In 2004 some 4,000 employees in Switzerland generated a turnover of 2.9 billion francs.

In June 2003 the German Rewe retail group took over a majority of the Bon appétit Group from Beat Curti, and later renamed the Swiss group Rewe Schweiz.

=== Breakup ===
Under Rewe ownership the group was progressively dismantled. The Usego wholesale business and the Primo/Visavis village-shop chains were sold off, while the catering wholesalers Prodega and Howeg were brought into Transgourmet, a joint venture with Coop. In 2005 Rewe sold the Pick Pay discount chain to Denner and withdrew from the Swiss retail market, two years after entering it.

== Bibliography ==
- O. Kopp, 75 Jahre Hofer & Co., 1958

=== Archives ===
- Schweizerisches Wirtschaftsarchiv (SWA)
