= Puuilo =

Finnish retail chain

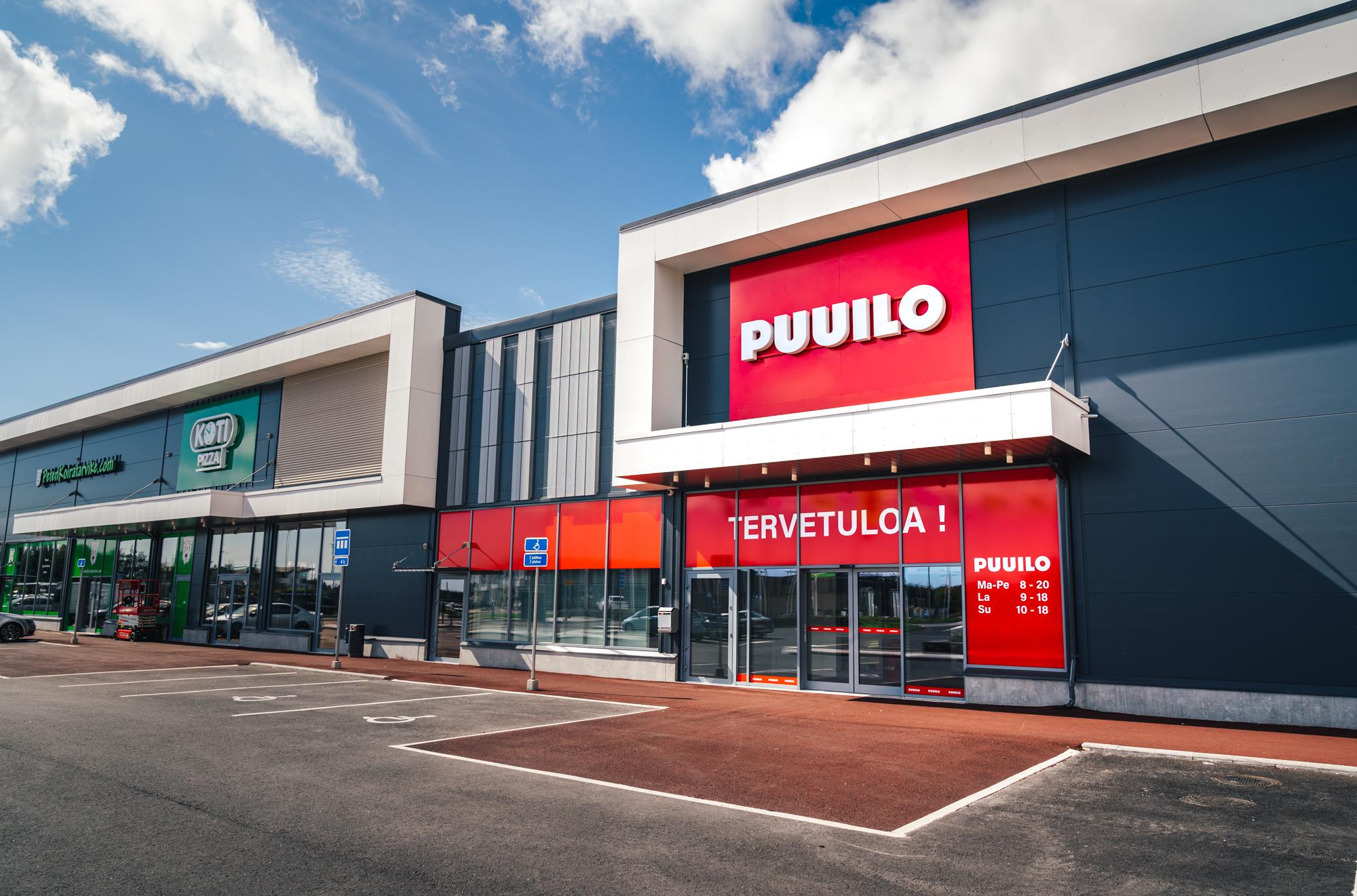
- Puuilo in Laajalahti, Espoo
- Type: Retail company
- ISIN: FI4000507124
- Founded: 1982; 44 years ago
- Headquarters: Vantaa, Finland
- Key people: Juha Saarela (CEO)
- Revenue: 270,100,000 (2021)
- Operating income: 44,500,000 (2021)
- Net income: 31,900,000 (2021)
- Website: puuilo.fi

Puuilo is a Finnish retail chain founded in 1982. The chain specializes in selling DIY products, such as tools, products for construction, and electrical and plumbing supplies. In addition, Puuilo also sells garden accessories, car accessories, household items, pet products and leisure products. Puuilo has about 60 stores in different parts of Finland. The company has announced plans to expand into Sweden by opening its first store in Örebro by the end of 2026 and the next store in Sundsvall the following year.

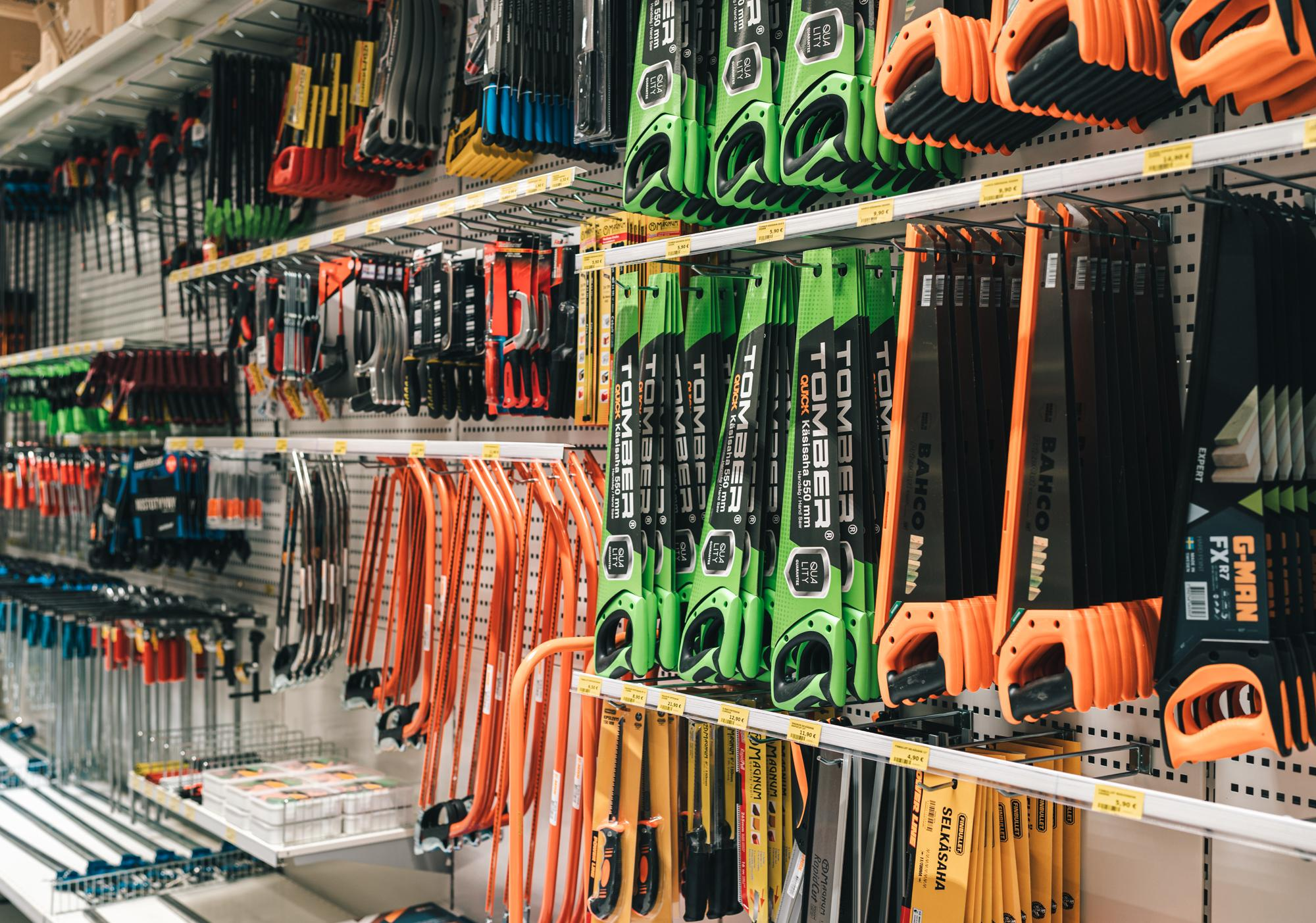
Tool selection in Puuilo

Puuilo has emerged as one of the leading players in the Finnish discount store market, and the company is one of Finland's largest store chains focused on consumer goods in terms of turnover. In the fiscal year ending in January 2023, Puuilo's turnover was €296.4 million, while a year earlier the turnover was €270.1 million.

Puuilo was listed on the main list of the Nasdaq Helsinki in June 2021. The share issue was oversubscribed many times over. In the listing, Puuilo gained more than 33,000 new owners. The value of the listing was approximately €274 million, which included a share issue of approximately €30 million. At the beginning of 2023, there were about 37,000 owners and about 30% of the shares were held by households and private individuals.

== History ==
Puuilo was founded in 1982, starting as a small carpentry workshop in Puolanka, Kainuu. The business was initially based on crafting and selling wooden toys and souvenirs. The company later transitioned to a mobile retail model, selling hardware and other goods from six converted buses that toured villages and town markets across Finland. This "shop-on-wheels" approach continued until the late 1990s, when the company shifted its strategy towards permanent retail locations. The first physical Puuilo store was opened in Kajaani in 1998.

The company's expansion into a national chain was significantly accelerated by the involvement of private equity firms. In October 2011, Sentica Partners acquired a 55% majority stake in the company, with the goal of providing resources to expand the store network into new cities. The founding family remained as significant minority shareholders following the acquisition.

In November 2015, Sentica sold its holdings to another private equity firm, Adelis Equity Partners.

Puuilo was listed on the main list of Nasdaq Helsinki in June 2021. The initial public offering (IPO) was multiple times oversubscribed and attracted over 33,000 new shareholders. The final subscription price was set at €6.60 per share, resulting in a market capitalization of approximately €560 million immediately following the offering. The total value of the offering was approximately €274 million, which consisted of a share issue that raised around €30 million in gross proceeds for the company, and a share sale where existing owners received approximately €242.6 million in proceeds.

Since becoming a public company, Puuilo has continued to report strong financial performance. For the fiscal year ending in January 2021, the company's net sales were €239 million. This grew to €383.4 million for the fiscal year ending January 2025, in which the company's adjusted EBITA was €67.0 million.

== Stores and Expansion ==
Puuilo's business concept is to offer a wide range of products at low prices, providing customers with an easy and convenient shopping experience. The company operates a network of 54 stores across Finland, complemented by an online store that is a key part of its multichannel business model.

The stores are typically located outside of city centers in retail parks and other commercial areas with good traffic connections and ample parking space, catering to customers who often arrive by car. The store layout is standardized across all locations to ensure a consistent and efficient shopping experience, allowing customers to easily find products.

The company pursues a strategy of rapid expansion, with the goal of opening approximately 7-10 new stores annually. Puuilo's long-term strategy, updated in September 2025, aims to expand its network to over 100 stores by the end of the 2030 fiscal year, which includes a planned organic expansion into the Swedish market with pilot stores.

== See also ==
- Tokmanni
