= Sogegross =

Italian retail company

Sogegross Group
- Industry: Retail
- Founded: 1920 in Genoa, Italy
- Founder: Ercole Gattiglia
- Headquarters: Genoa, Italy
- Area served: Italy
- Key people: Vittorio Gattiglia (president); Maurizio Gattiglia (CEO)
- Products: Food and consumer goods
- Brands: Sogegross; Basko; Doro Supermercati; Ekom
- Number of employees: 2,600 (2017)
- Website: sogegross.it

Sogegross Group is an Italian supermarket company operating in wholesale trade under the cash and carry formula as Sogegross and in retail under the brands Basko, Doro Supermercati, and Ekom.

The company is based in Genoa, with stores in Liguria, Tuscany, Piedmont, Aosta Valley, Lombardy, and Piacenza.

== History ==
Sogegross began in the San Martino district of Genoa as a grocery store in 1920 when it was purchased by Ercole Gattiglia and his wife. The turning point happened in 1945 when Augusto Gattiglia, Ercole's son, together with two of his brothers, began on the one hand to produce sweets and on the other to operate as wholesale traders.

In 1970, the first Cash & Carry was born, and in 1987, the company launched their first retail location, creating the Basko brand. The Doro supermarket chain was launched in 1991, and 1993 saw the creation of the Ekom discount store chain. In 2004 the group, led by Vittorio Gattiglia, consolidated thanks to the acquisition of a dozen Conad stores. They also expanded into neighbouring regions, including to Lombardy in 2016, becoming one of the top ten Italian private large-scale distribution companies, with a turnover reaching €872 million in 2017 and with about 230 stores in total. Also in 2017, the company decided to build a new logistics centre on the outskirts of Genoa, in Val Polcevera, investing €30 million into the project.

== Brands ==
The following brands fall under the Sogegross Group:

Sogegross Cash & Carry and GrosMarket The group's historical distribution format is Cash & Carry, with 17 locations distributed throughout Liguria, Piedmont, Emilia-Romagna, and Tuscany.

Basko The Basko brand is represented by local supermarkets and small superstores (Iperfresco Basko), both directly owned by the group.

Doro Supermarkets Convenience stores and small franchised supermarkets present in Liguria, Tuscany, Piedmont, and Aosta Valley.

Ekom Discount grocery stores operating in Liguria, Tuscany, Piedmont, Aosta Valley, and Lombardy.

== Stores ==
Current stores operated by Sogegross Group:

Region	Sogegross	Basko	Doro	Ekom
Emilia-Romagna	3	3	0	1
Liguria	7	43	34	57
Lombardy	0	1	0	2
Piedmont	4	9	10	27
Tuscany	3	0	2	13
Aosta Valley	0	0	1	1

== Affiliations ==
Sogegross Group is part of the Agorà Network, an organization which since 2000 also groups three other large-scale retail chains operating in northern Italy: Tigros, Poli Group, and Iperal Group (Iperal, Sermark, GranDì). This synergy has allowed these small groups to create their own product line, Primia, present in all the network's stores.
