= OOBE =

OOBE may refer to:

- Out-of-box experience, the experience a user has with a new product
- Out-of-body experience, a phenomenon in which a person perceives the world from a location outside their physical body
- "Oobe", a track on the albums U.F.Orb and Live 93 by The Orb

== See also ==
- OOB (disambiguation)
