= MD Discount =

Italian global discount supermarket

MD (company)
- Trade name: MD
- Company type: Società per azioni
- Industry: Retailing
- Founded: 1994; 32 years ago
- Founder: Patrizio Podini
- Headquarters: Gricignano di Aversa, Italy
- Number of locations: 782
- Area served: Italy
- Key people: Patrizio Podini, Chairman
- Products: Discount store (supermarkets)
- Revenue: ▲€3.7 billion (2024)
- Number of employees: 9,000+
- Website: www.mdspa.it

MD S.p.A. is an Italian global discount supermarket chain, based in Gricignano di Aversa, Italy.

== History ==
The company was founded in the 1994 by Patrizio Podini. The first store in MD brand was opened in September 1994 in Mugnano di Napoli. Initially, the company, then named Lillo S.p.A., focused on expanding in Southern Italy. In little more than a year have been opened more than fifty stores in the Centre-South, some of whom detecting signs premises.

In 2015 MD distributes its products through a network of more than 800 outlets and direct affiliates.

Recently MD bought LD Market for the price of 170 million, making it the third largest sector discount in Italy, after EuroSpin and Lidl.

== See also ==
- List of companies of Italy
