= Svetofor =

Russian supermarket chain

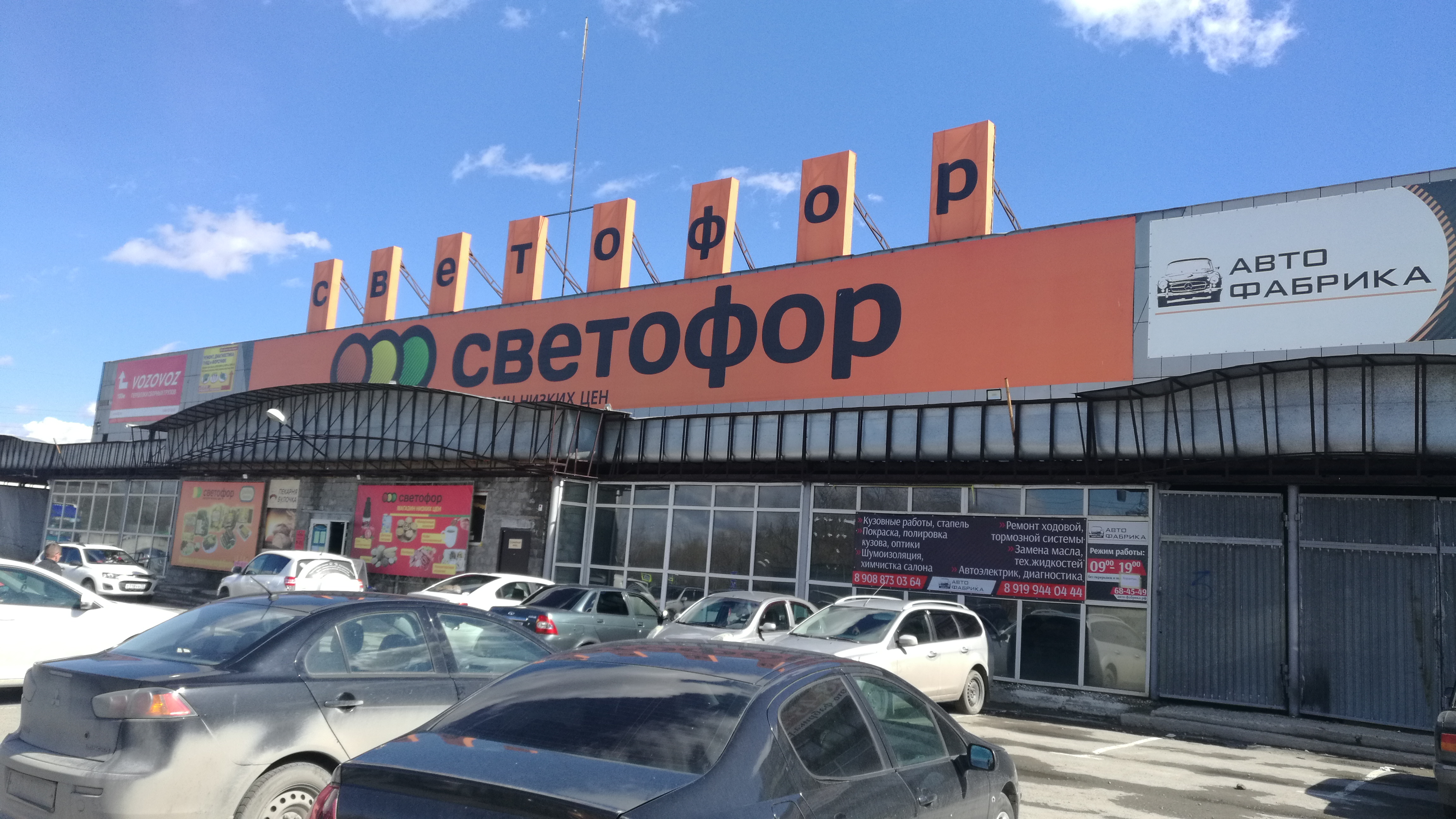
- Industry: Retail
- Founded: 2009
- Founder: Valentina Shnayder
- Headquarters: Krasnoyarsk, Russia
- Parent: Torgservis
- Website: https://svetoforonline.ru

Svetofor ('traffic light' in Russian) is a chain of discount supermarkets headquartered in Krasnoyarsk, Russia. The chain, owned by Torgservis, operates stores in Russia, Kazakhstan, Serbia, Belarus and China. As of December 2019 its network comprised approximately 1,400 locations.

== History ==
=== Expansion in the European Union ===
In November 2017, the chain registered the MERE brand trademark with the European Union Intellectual Property Office, and the first store under this branding opened the following year in Snagov, Romania. MERE has since expanded into other European markets including Germany, Belarus, Lithuania and Poland, where it opened its first outlet in Częstochowa in July 2020. In 2021 it planned to open its first stores in the United Kingdom, Bulgaria, Latvia, Austria, Spain and Italy. Launch in Slovakia was planned for 2022. In Greece, they started operating in May 2021, after a one-year delay due to the COVID-19 pandemic and the measures taken by the Greek Government to limit the spread of the disease. Today, 4 large supermarkets operate in the cities of Tripoli, Larissa, Corinth and Agrinio. The managing company of the Greek department is called TORG HELLAS IKE and is based in Athens. In 2023, the Russian owners declared their willingness to remain in the Greek market at all costs and proceeded with a large capital increase of their company. The company's goal is 80 stores in Greece with the primary goal of development mainly in Athens and Thessaloniki. In December 2025, the company opened its first store in Budapest, Hungary, under the name of Basket Plus.

The company's operating model aims to undercut local supermarket prices by around 20-30% by having suppliers deliver directly to stores, keeping staffing levels low and displaying goods directly on the pallets on which they arrive.

== Trade organization ==
The chain's stores are usually located in places that are unattractive to competitors, far from residential areas, although by 2020 stores began to appear in more familiar places.

The chain's stores are located at a considerable distance from each other (at least 3 kilometers). A typical store from the inside is a concrete box without decoration like in a traditional store. It looks like a warehouse with goods on pallets and cash registers. This approach allows you to achieve rental rates several times lower than those of competitors.

Svetofor also pursues a strict policy towards suppliers, either using little-known trademarks or receiving significant discounts from large suppliers. For the latter, the network is attractive because, due to the narrow assortment, sales of the goods selected by the network will be disproportionately high compared to networks that provide the buyer with more choice. Svetofor uses another approach that is traditional for such networks (but unique in Russia) — the widespread use of goods that manufacturers are ready to "merge" at a reduced price (for example, due to the expiration date of storage soon).

The terms of cooperation with MERE are even tougher. The price of the product, together with delivery to the store, should be 20-30% lower than that of competitors (compared to well-known brands with a reputation, the difference should be 50%). The supplier must deliver the goods to each store on his own and at his own expense, ensure that 100% of unsold goods can be returned and be responsible for the clearance of imported products through customs.

== Controversies ==
In 2021, MERE was banned from operating in Ukraine due to its connections with Russian secret services.

In March 2022, MERE closed its only UK store, in Preston, due to supplier issues due to the way the company pays for goods and also the political pressure caused by the war in Ukraine.

In early April 2022, activists in Poland organized a protest related to the criticism of MERE as a Russian network, in connection with Russia's invasion of Ukraine.
