= Överskottsbolaget =

Swedish discount store chain

ÖoB AB
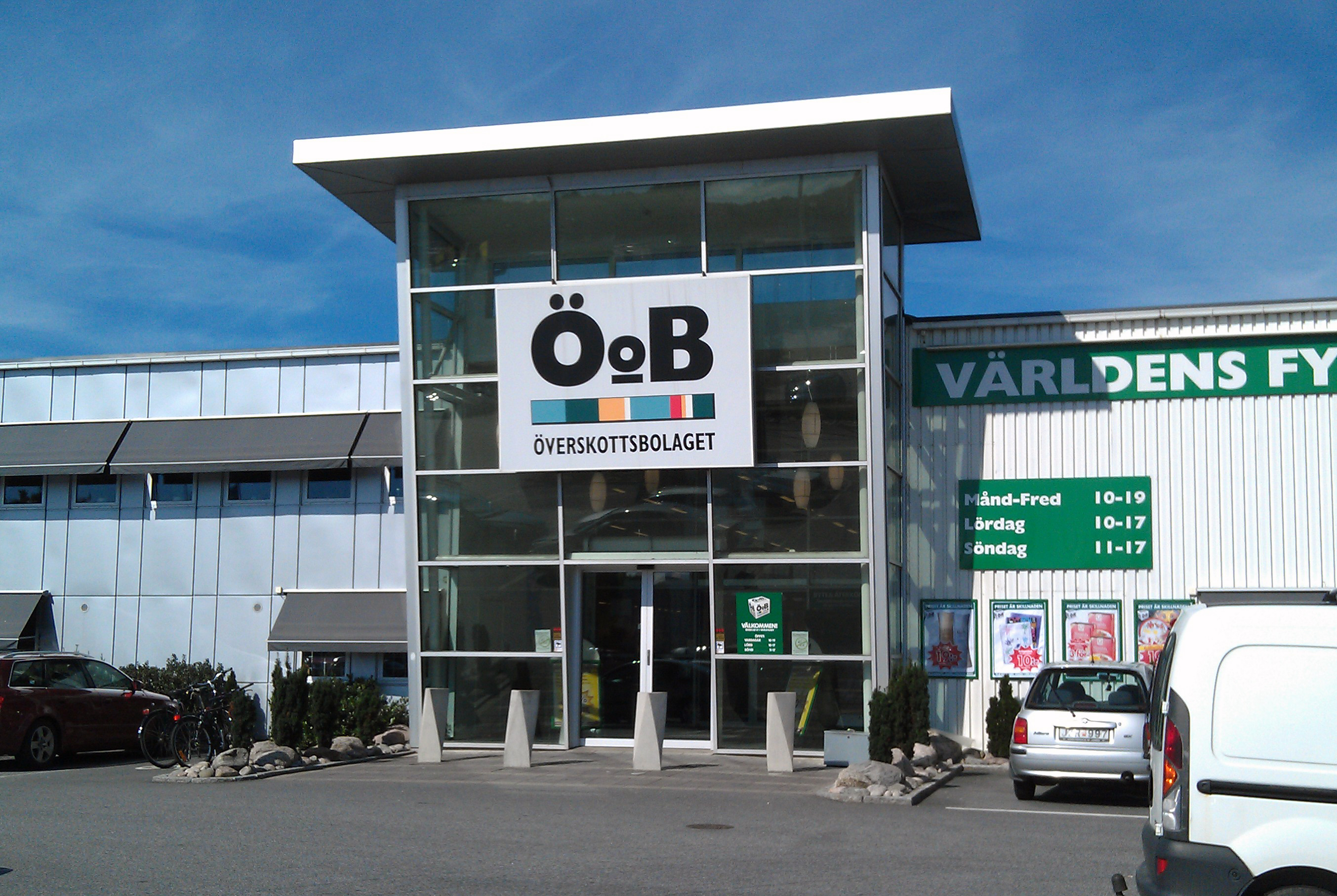
- The entrance to a branch in Varberg, Halland
- Company type: Aktiebolag
- Genre: Retailing
- Founded: 1948
- Headquarters: Mjölby, Sweden
- Revenue: 4.13 billion SEK (2014)
- Number of employees: 1174 (2014)
- Website: www.öob.se

ÖoB (former Överskottsbolaget) is a Swedish discount store, owned by the Runsvengruppen. It sells non-perishable food and drink, health & beauty products, homewares, DIY products and garden equipment. It has over 100 stores nationwide.

== History ==
=== Runsvengruppen ===
The company was founded in 1948 by Rune Svensson when he opened a village shop in Mariedamm (Askersund Municipality) which he created a direct sales channel and later expanded to a store in the nearby town of Skänninge in 1957. Due to difficulties with suppliers at home in Sweden, he started sourcing goods from China and Eastern Europe for his stores. This created his chain of Bonusvaruhusen. He later passed on his chain to his son Oskar in 1977.

In 1992, Runsvengruppen bought Överskottsbolaget with its nine stores, and later changed the retail name for all stores of the group to Överskottsbolaget (English translation: The surplus company) or ÖoB for short. The seemingly superfluous o between Ö and B was added as ÖB is short for Överbefälhavare, or Commander-in-chief, and is thus prohibited for use as a company name.

=== Överskottsbolaget ===
Överskottsbolaget first came about in 1960, when the Swedish army quartermasters (Försvarets Fabriksverk, FFV) started selling surplus items, hence the name (överskott means surplus) from the Swedish army directly to the public. FFV was privatised in 1991. In 2018, Norwegian Europris took a 20% stake in the company's share capital.
