= Conad =

Italian supermarket chain

- Native name: Consorzio Nazionale Dettaglianti
- Type: Supermarket chain
- Industry: Department store
- Founded: Bologna, Italy (May 13, 1962; 64 years ago)
- Headquarters: Bologna, Italy
- Number of locations: 4,500+
- Area served: Italy, Albania, Kosovo, San Marino
- Key people: Mauro Lusetti, President; Francesco Avanzini, Director General
- Revenue: €21.7 billion (2025)
- Number of employees: 75,665 (2025)
- Website: www.conad.it

Conad (Consorzio Nazionale Dettaglianti, English: National Retailers Consortium), stylized CONAD, is an Italian retail store brand, which operates as the largest supermarket chain in Italy, with more than 4,500 stores across the country under the names CONAD, Margherita, Spazio Conad, Tuday Conad and Todis.

== History ==
Created in 1962, Conad is a cooperative system of entrepreneurs, dealing in large-scale distribution. It is structured on three levels: entrepreneur members (owners of retail outlets), cooperatives (large shopping and distribution centres), and the national consortium (a service and market-oriented body for member companies).

Since 9 May 2023, Mauro Lusetti has been the President of Conad. The Director General is Francesco Avanzini.

== Stores ==
Conad is represented in all 20 regions of Italy with over 3300 retail stores in total, across all their brands. They hold a market share of over 15%. In addition to the grocery stores, there are also the distribution lines "Parafarmacia Conad" (pharmacies) with 185 locations, "PetStore Conad" (pet shops) with 140 locations, "Conad Self 24h" (petrol station stores) with 47 offices and "Ottico Conad" (opticians) with 22 offices, as of 2023. In 2023, their net profit was over 159 million euros. The chain employs over 77,800 people across its entire Italian network.

Conad launched their first hypermarket in Italy in 1990, under the name Pianeta Conad in Modena.

In 2019, Conad bought the 33 stores operated in Sicily by the brand Auchan, along with 50 pharmacies operated by Lillapois. Since 2019, Conad has stopped the sale of eggs from caged hens. This action is a continuation of an initiative started in 2018 "to remove eggs from caged hens from Conad branded products".

Conad also operates internationally, with stores in Albania, Kosovo, and San Marino. It formerly operated in China and Hong Kong.

Format	Stores	Assortment (items)	Average store size	Description
Spazio Conad	80	From 16.000 to 19.000	4.954 m²	Hypermarkets
Conad Superstore	250	From 10.500 to 12.000	2.971 m²	Large supermarkets
Conad	1,193	From 7.000 to 8.500	1.801 m²	Medium supermarkets
Conad City	1,002	From 4.500 to 5.500	400 m²	Markets
Sapori&Dintorni Conad	17	From 3.000 to 4.000	464 m²	Typical food specialties shops
Margherita Conad	334	About 1500	344 m²	Small markets
Tuday Conad	32	From 5.000 to 6.000	430 m²	Cashierless supermarkets
Todis	252	From 5.000 to 7.000	622 m²	Discount shops
Others	112			
