= Penny (supermarket) =

German discount supermarket chain

- Type: Subsidiary
- Industry: Retail
- Founded: 1973; 53 years ago
- Headquarters: Cologne, Germany
- Key people: Alain Caparros, managing director
- Products: Discount stores
- Revenue: ▲€ 10.3 billion (2010)
- Number of employees: 43,773 (2010)
- Parent: Rewe Group
- Website: www.penny.de

Penny (German pronunciation: [ˈpɛni]) or internationally Penny Market (in Bavaria and Austria Penny Markt) is a German discount supermarket business based in Germany, which operates 3,550 stores. The market was founded by Leibbrand Gruppe in 1973; since 1989, it has been fully owned by the Rewe Group.

In France, the chain was bought in 2005 by the Ed brand of the Carrefour group. In 2010, it operated approximately 3,000 stores across 6 countries in Europe. As of May 2014, Penny was present in Germany, Austria, Bulgaria, Hungary, Italy, Czech Republic and Romania, with Turkey soon to come. After taking over 7 stores in Liguria from Tuodì in October 2017 for €9.2 million, it is present in Italy with 357 points of sale distributed in 17 regions, served by 7 distribution centers.

These are the capital cities where Penny operates and has stores:

1. Berlin (Germany)
2. Bucharest (Romania)
3. Rome (Italy)
4. Prague (Czech Republic)
5. Vienna (Austria)
6. Budapest (Hungary)

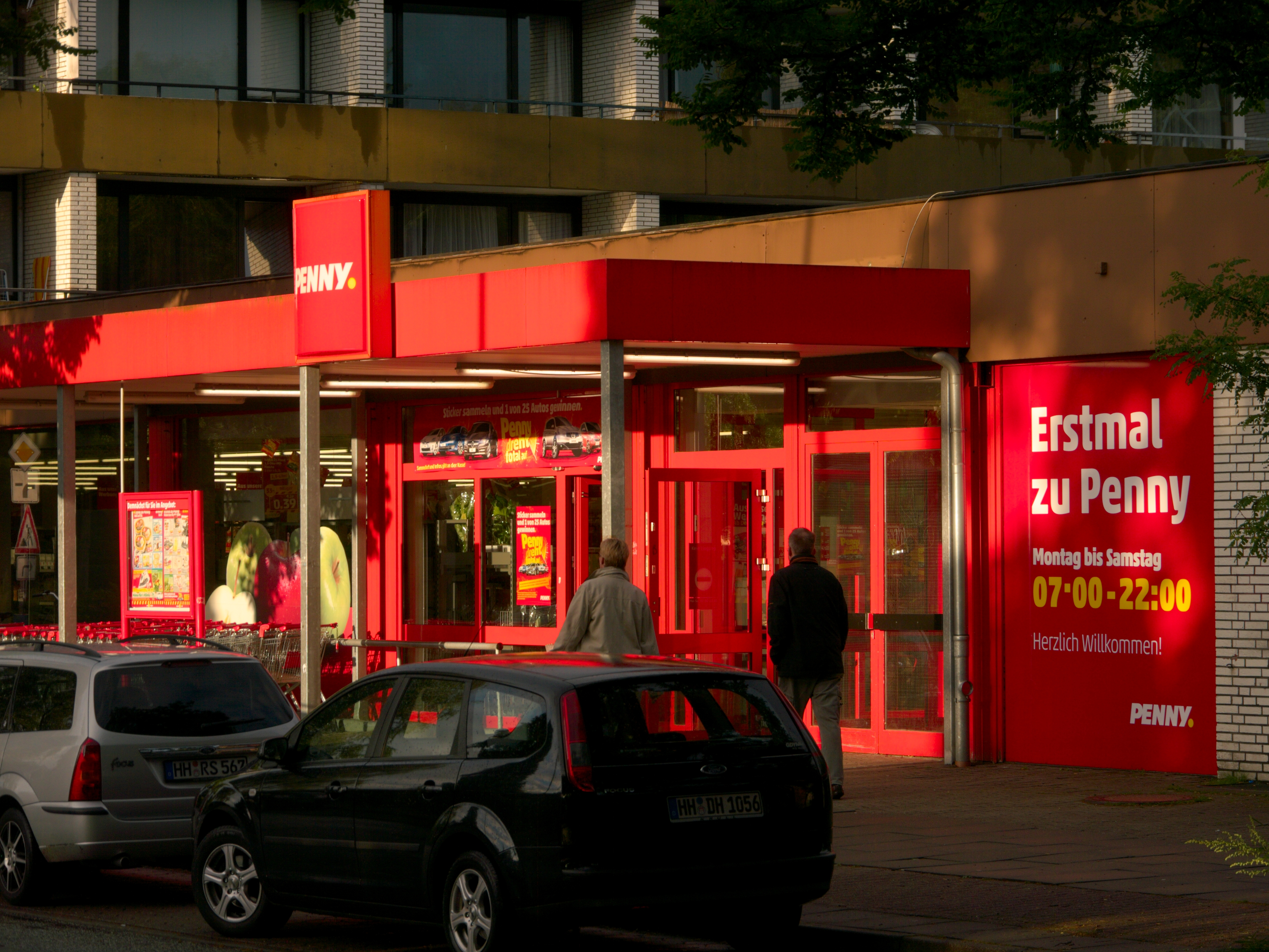
Penny store with new corporate branding in Hamburg, Germany

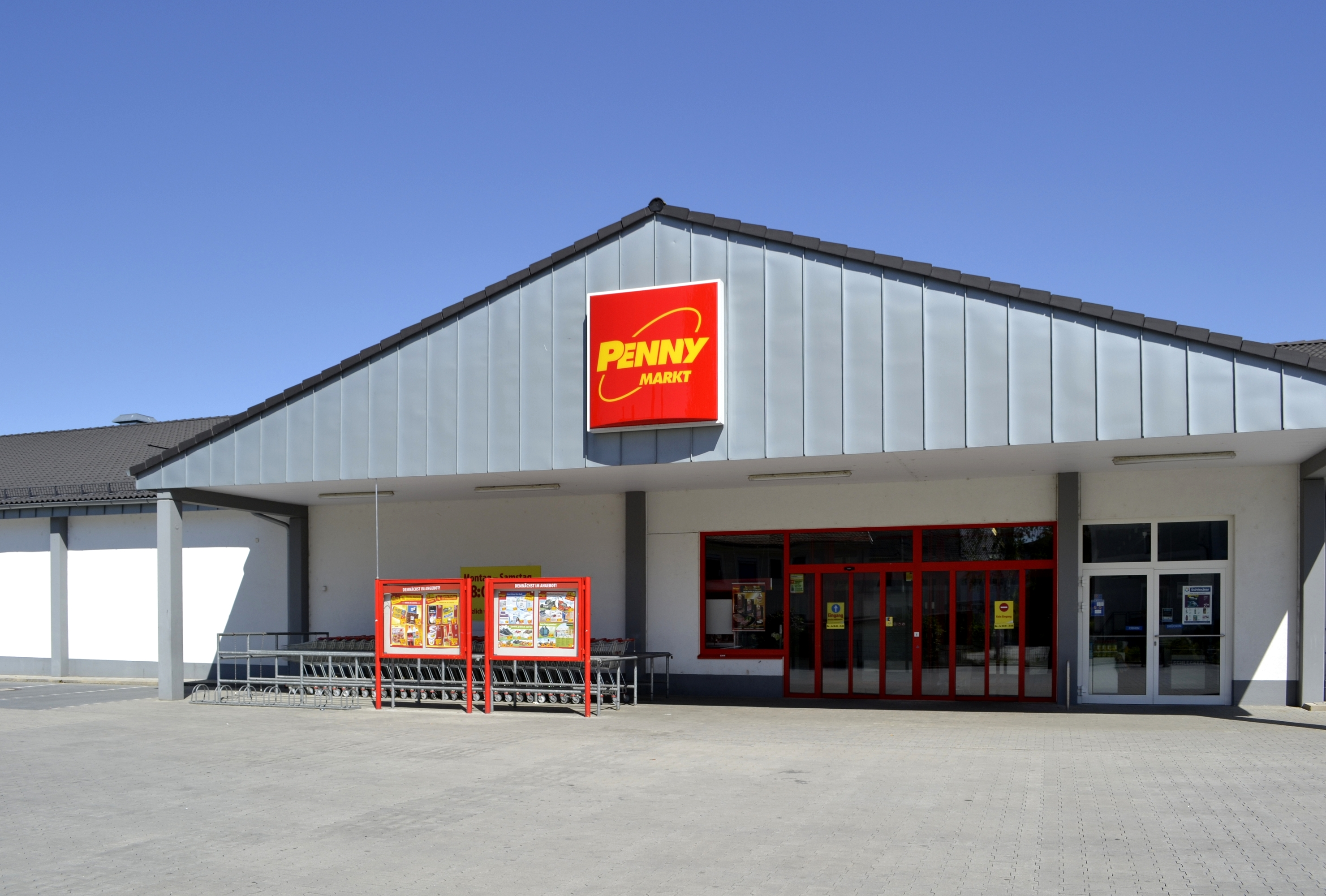
Penny Markt

== Operations ==
Country	Number of stores
Austria	290
Czech Republic	441
Germany	2,250
Hungary	233
Italy	365
Romania	462 with 7,500 employees

- Penny Market exited the Bulgarian market on October 31, 2015.

== See also ==
- REWE Group
- Billa
- Selgros
- Aldi
- Lidl

Old logo between 2002 and 2014
