= Eurospin =

Italian supermarket chain

Eurospin Italia S.p.A.

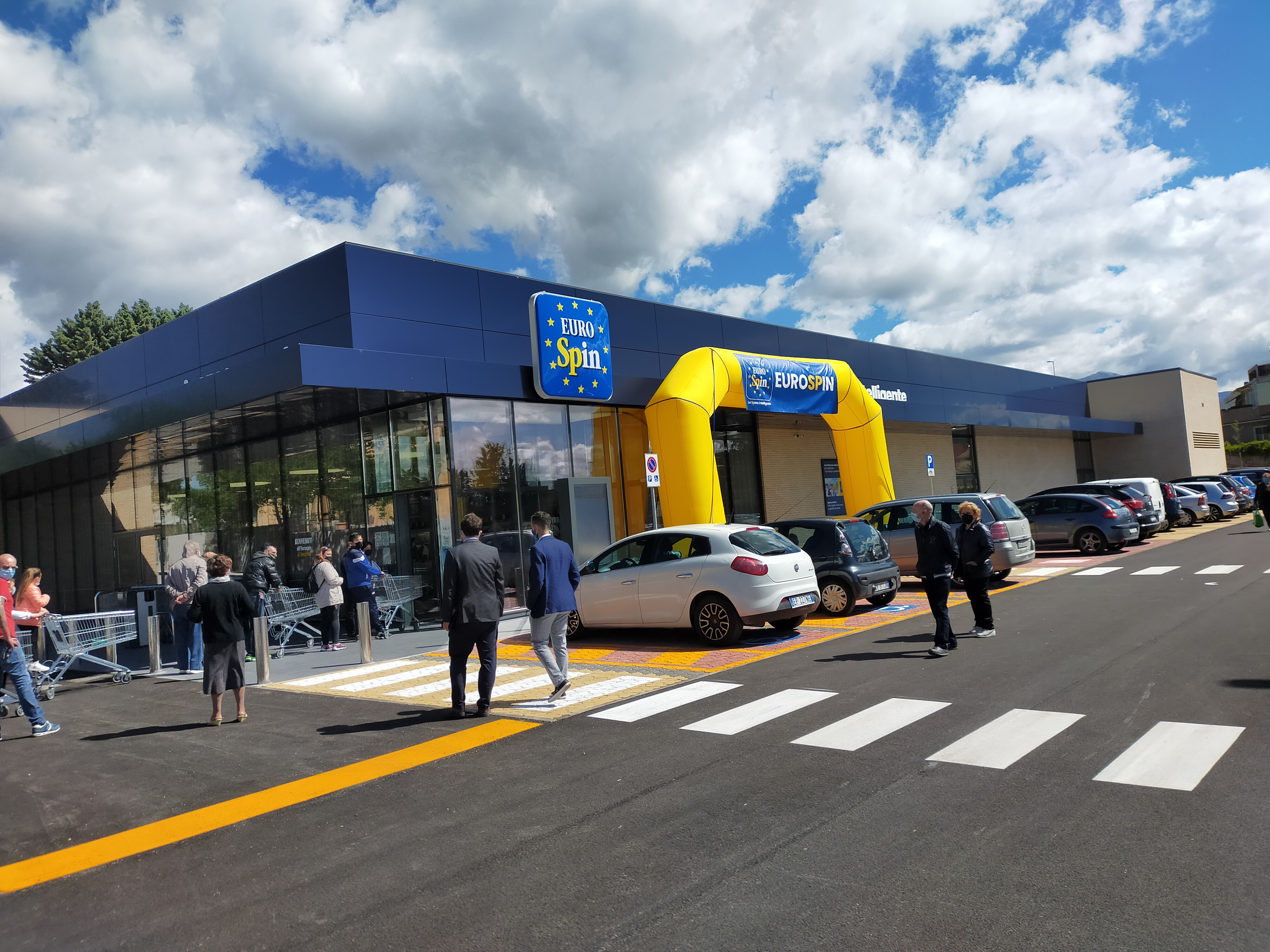
- Eurospin supermarket in Avezzano, Italy.
- Type: Private S.p.A.
- Industry: Mass-market retailing
- Founded: 1993; 33 years ago
- Headquarters: San Martino Buon Albergo, Italy
- Number of locations: Italy: 1200 (2024); Slovenia: 60 (2026); Croatia: 42 (2026); Malta: 2 (2026)
- Area served: Italy; Slovenia; Croatia; Malta
- Products: Foodstuffs; Consumer goods
- Website: www.eurospin.com

Eurospin (Italian: Spesa intelligente, lit. 'Smart shopping') is an Italian company in the large-scale retail trade of food and consumer goods in the discount chain present in Italy, Slovenia, Croatia and Malta. In 2025, Eurospin will open its first market in Serbia.

== History ==
Eurospin was founded in 1993 on the initiative of four families of entrepreneurs already active in the large-scale retail trade: the Pozzis of the Lombard Dugan, the Mions of the Veronese Migross, the Odorizzis of the Trentino cooperative Dao, and the Barbons of the Treviso-based Vega. The group, the first Italian-owned discount chain, initially used the franchising formula and then began to open its own stores.

In 2004 the brand landed in Slovenia, in 2020 in Croatia and in 2024 in Malta.

Since 2009 it has also been involved in the sale of travel with the EuroSpin Viaggi brand.

== Group structure ==
The Eurospin group is structured as follows:

				EuroSpin Italia S.p.A. holding
Spesa Intelligente S.p.A. Italy	EuroSpin Tirrenica S.p.A. Italy	EuroSpin Lazio S.p.A. Italy	EuroSpin Puglia S.p.A. Italy	EuroSpin Sicilia S.p.A. Italy	Spinservice S.r.l. Italy	New Business S.r.l. Italy	EuroSpin Eko d.o.o. Slovenia	EuroSpin Hrvatska d.o.o. Croatia

== Number of locations ==
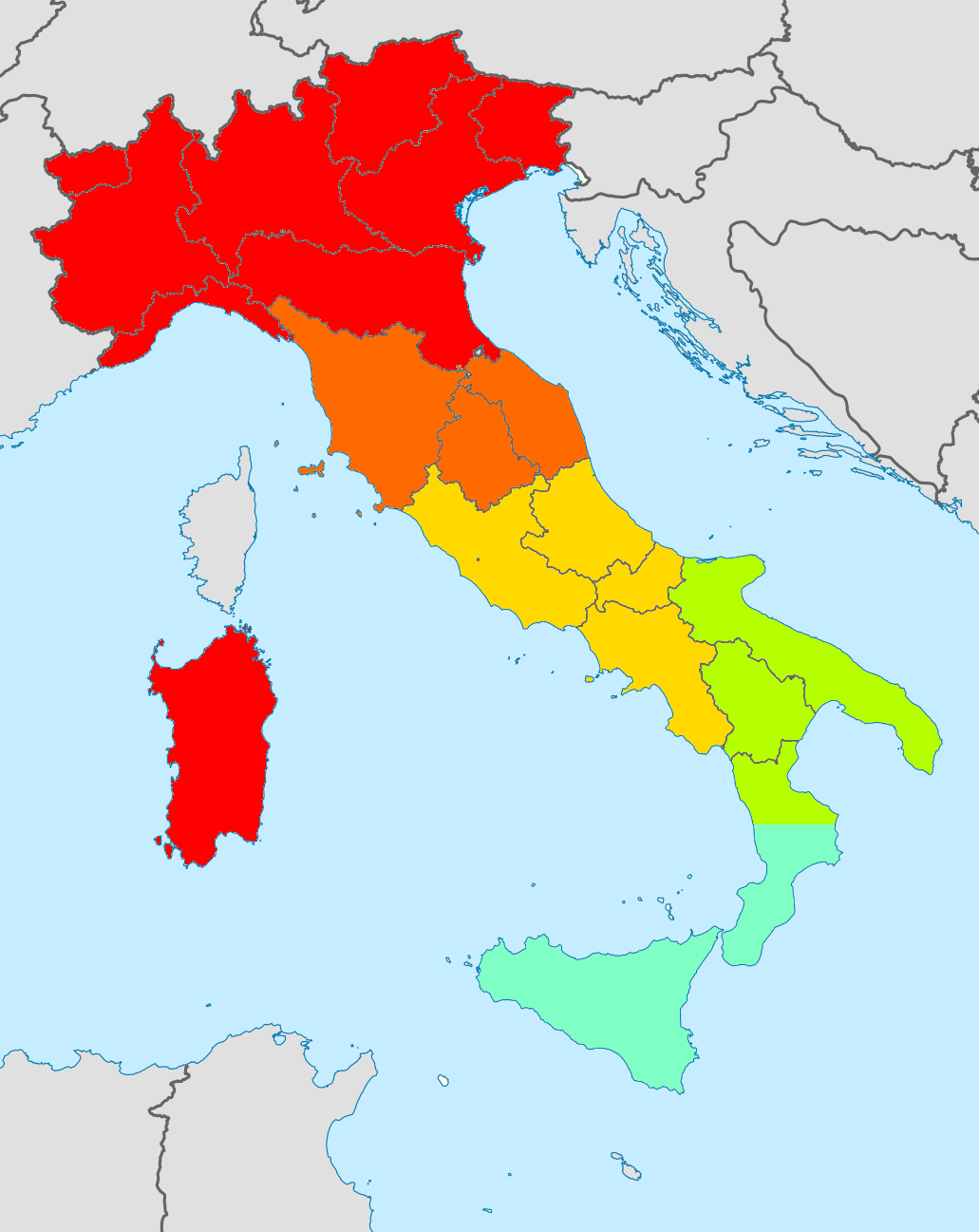
EuroSpin Italia regions: with Spesa Intelligente in red, EuroSpin Tirrenica in orange, EuroSpin Lazio in yellow, EuroSpin Puglia in green, and EuroSpin Sicilia in mint

EuroSpin's sales network in 2024:

Country	Start time	Stores number
Italy	1993	1200
Slovenia	2004	60
Croatia	2020	42
Malta	2024	2
Serbia	2026	TBD

== See also ==
- Discount store#Italy
