= Selgros =

German cash and carry store chain owned by Coop (Switzerland)

- Type: Private
- Industry: Retail
- Founded: 1959; 67 years ago (Selgros); 1966; 60 years ago (Fegro); 1989; 37 years ago (Fegro/Selgros)
- Headquarters: Neu Isenburg, Germany
- Area served: Germany, Romania, Poland
- Products: Cash & Carry Stores
- Revenue: ▲€2,997 million (2007)
- Number of employees: ~14.400 (2007)
- Parent: Coop (Switzerland)

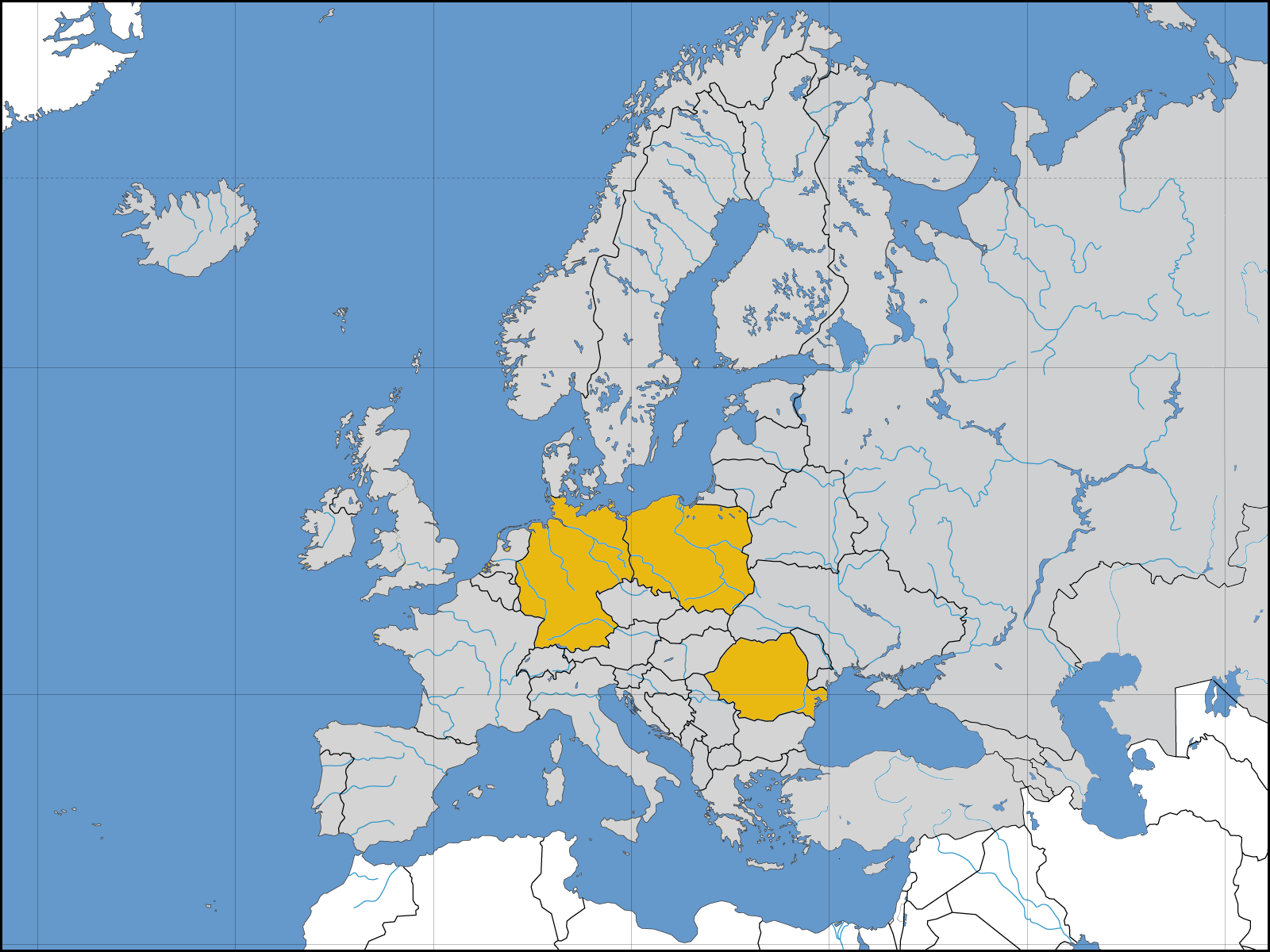
Selgros activities in Europe

Selgros is a cash and carry chain in Europe, owned by Transgourmet Holding, a wholly owned subsidiary of Coop (Switzerland). It started in 1989 as a joint venture between Rewe Group (50%) and Otto Group (50%). In March 2008, Rewe took over 100% of the company, and in October 2008 formed the Transgourmet Holding company with Coop. In 2011, Coop purchased the remaining interests of Transgourmet, which included Selgros.

== Operations in Europe ==
=== Romania ===
In Romania, Selgros owns a total of 24 hypermarkets throughout the country, with four stores in Bucharest, two stores in Constanţa, two stores in Târgu Mureş and with one store each in Timișoara, Cluj-Napoca, Iaşi, Craiova, Arad, Oradea, Braşov, Ploieşti, Bacău, Suceava, Galaţi, Brăila, Bistrița, Baia Mare, Sibiu and Alba Iulia.

=== Poland ===
In Poland, Selgros has opened 20 hypermarkets, with four stores in Warsaw, Wrocław and Łódź and with one store each in Szczecin, Gdańsk, Białystok, Bytom, Radom, Kraków, Poznań, Katowice, Lublin, Siedlce, Gliwice and Lubin.

=== Germany ===
In Germany, Selgros operates 38 hypermarkets throughout the country, with its corporate headquarters located in Riedstadt, Hesse.

=== Russia ===
Selgros operated cash & carry stores in Russia from 2006 until the mid-2020s. Following the Russian invasion of Ukraine, parent company Transgourmet withdrew from its Russian food-service operations in March 2022 via a management buyout, while the Selgros retail chain continued trading. In November 2024, Selgros agreed to sell 100% of its Russian assets, including the distributor Global Foods, to the Arosa Group; the transaction completed in December 2024. Following the acquisition, the retail network faced severe financial difficulties, mounting lawsuits, and insolvency proceedings. As a result, all Selgros retail stores in Russia were closed by 2026, marking the brand's complete exit from the Russian retail market, though the associated distributor Global Foods continued operations.
