= REWE Group =

German supermarket corporation

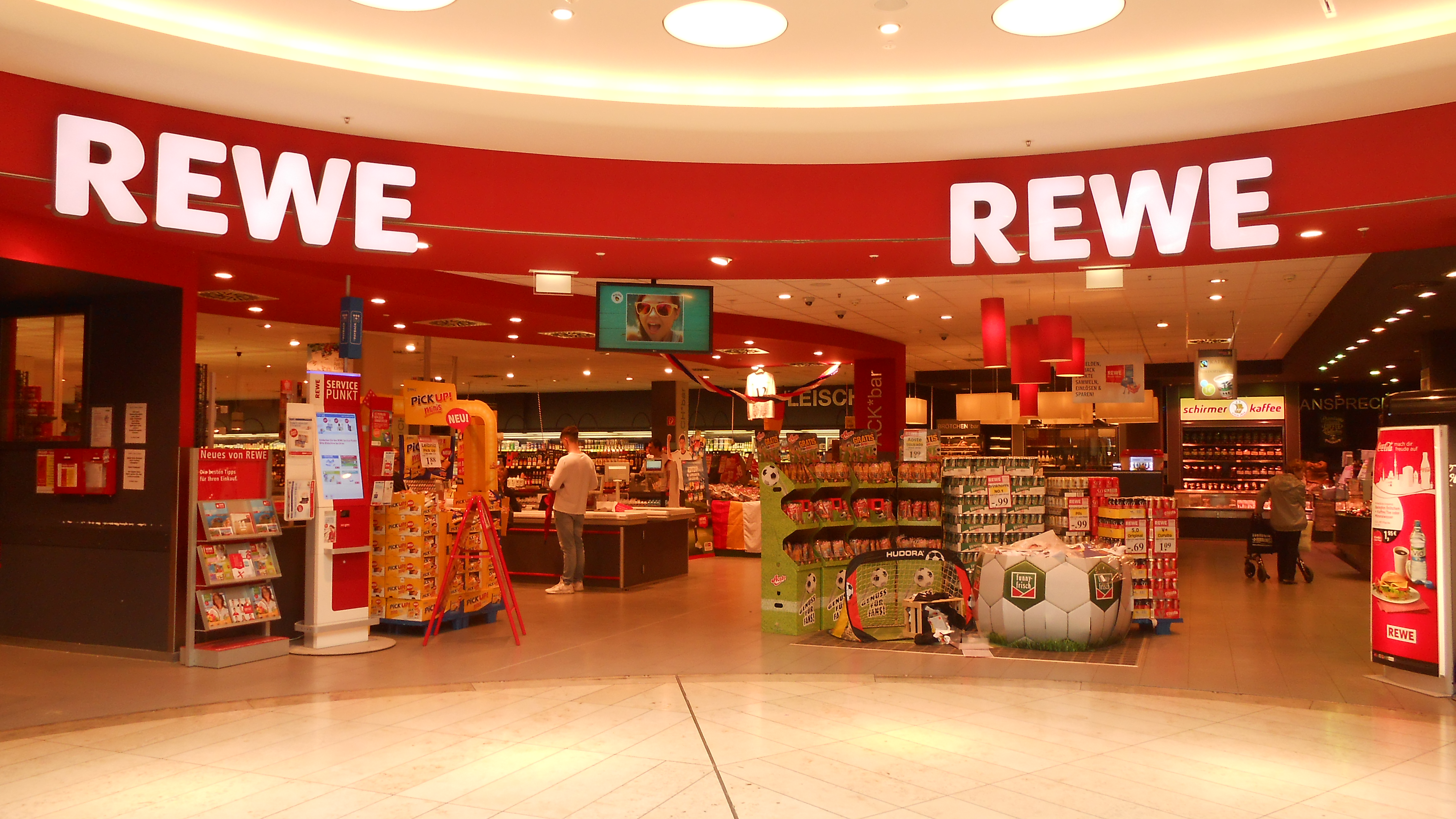
- A REWE grocery store in Dortmund, Germany
- Type: Private, cooperative joint-stock company
- Industry: Retailing
- Predecessor: Stüssgen
- Founded: 1927 (current form 1972)
- Headquarters: Cologne, Germany
- Key people: Lionel Souque (CEO); Heinz-Bert Zander (Chairman)
- Products: Department stores; Supermarkets; Convenience stores; Cash & carry; Hypermarkets; Home improvement
- Revenue: €84.4 billion (2022)
- Operating income: 491,400,000 (2017)
- Net income: 337,800,000 (2017)
- Total assets: 19,506,400,000 (2017)
- Number of employees: 363,633 (2019)
- Website: rewe-group.com

The REWE Group is a German diversified retail and tourism co-operative group based in Cologne. The name REWE comes from "Revisionsverband der Westkauf-Genossenschaften", meaning "western buying co-operatives auditing association".

== History ==
REWE-Zentralfinanz eG forms the parent company of the co-operative, whilst the operational business is controlled by the subsidiary entitled REWE-Zentral AG. The international business is bundled under the umbrella of Rewe International.

The basis of the co-operative trade group consists of a network of independent retailers. Sales lines include Billa, Penny, Rewe, Toom, DER Touristik Germany, as well as ITS Reisen and Lekkerland.

In the 2022 financial year, the REWE Group had total external sales of €84.4 billion. The REWE Group is the second largest supermarket chain in Germany behind EDEKA.

=== 1927–1945 ===
In 1927, the Auditing Association of Westkauf Cooperatives, also known as Rewe, began offering purchasing services in Cologne. Their aim was to promote independent retailers by facilitating group purchasing at competitive rates. Early product offerings most frequently traded included hazelnuts, dried apricots and raisins. In order to gain further advantages, in the 1930s cooperatives began to influence the shop fittings and advertising of affiliated outlets, this was accompanied by the introduction of uniform lettering to the affiliated outlets in 1932.

In 1935, several purchasing cooperatives from Central Germany merged with Rewe. To enable further growth, district centers were developed each of which, to this day, form the foundation of Rewe's business structure. Alongside this, during the 1930s, Rewe gradually began to expand outside the traditional Rhenish-Westphalian area. In 1940, Rewe had a membership of 8,000 people with 106 cooperatives registered. The Second World War had a disruptive effect on the trading group as essential goods had become scarce and many shop-owners had to go to the front for military service. To counter this, Rewe diversified into production. Subsequently, a significant part of their administration was destroyed by bombing resulting in the company being almost unable to function at the close of war.

=== 1946–1972 ===
Following the end of the war, Rewe resumed activities in August 1945. After the wartime headquarters had been relocated to Fredeburg and Bödefeld due to the approaching front, Rewe returned to Cologne. The division of Germany into sectors resulted in restricted work and the gradual emergence of branches in West Germany and West Berlin. Shortage of basic supplies such as sugar, prompted the introduction of the first trademarks in 1949, with Rewe Dreistern covering flour, salt and table oil, margarine being supplied under the Replica Kronjuwel brand. As reconstruction took place, Rewe became increasingly decentralised, and by 1960 their member companies had returned to over 100.

Several takeovers of supermarkets and chains in the 1960s and 1970s led to a broad range of brands and formats. In 1971, there were talks between Rewe and Edeka about a potential merger, which could have accounted for approximately 25% of the market. Ultimately, due to antitrust concerns, the project was not implemented. In 1972, the partnership model still used today was introduced, following the previously independent regional cooperatives ceding management functions to Rewe headquarters in 1968. The head office was converted into a joint-stock company whose wholesaler shareholders went on to manage all central services and sales promotion.

== Divisions ==
=== Trading ===
- REWE – Supermarket chain in Germany with 3,300 stores
- BILLA – Supermarket chain with over 1,000 stores in Austria and 400 stores in other European countries
- Penny – Discount supermarket chain with 3,000 stores in Germany, Austria, Italy, Romania, Hungary, and Czech Republic
- nahkauf – Convenience store operator in Germany
- toom BauMarkt – A home improvement chain with 250 stores in Germany
- Billa Plus – Supermarket chain with 100 stores in Austria (formerly known as Merkur)
- BIPA – Health and beauty retail chain with 560 stores in Austria and 58 stores in Croatia
- REWE Ihr Kaufpark – Supermarket chain with 120 stores in North Rhine-Westphalia, Germany (formerly known as Kaufpark)
- IKI Lietuva – Supermarket chain in Lithuania

=== Tourism ===
DER Touristik is the tourism division of Rewe Group:

- Tour operator brands: ITS, Jahn Reisen, Dertour, Meier’s Weltreisen and ADAC Reisen and clevertours.com
- Hotel brands: lti Hotels, Club Calimera and PrimaSol Hotels

In June 2015 DER acquired Kuoni Travel's European tour operations.

=== Switzerland (2003–2005) ===
Rewe briefly entered the Swiss market in the mid-2000s. In June 2003 it acquired a majority of the Bern-based Bon appétit Group—then Switzerland's third-largest food trader after Migros and Coop—reportedly for about 265 million francs, taking control of brands including the discounter Pick Pay, the Primo and Visavis shop chains, the Usego wholesale business, and the catering wholesalers Prodega and Howeg. On 1 July 2005 the retail companies of the Bon appétit Group were merged and renamed Rewe Schweiz AG, retiring the Bon appétit and Usego names.

The venture was short-lived. Rewe progressively divested the group's operations: the Primo and Visavis village shops were handed to other distributors, while the catering wholesalers Prodega and Howeg were placed in Transgourmet, a joint venture with Coop. In September 2005 Rewe agreed to sell its 146 Pick Pay outlets and the Egerkingen distribution center to the discounter Denner, which integrated them into its own network and retired the Pick Pay name. With the sale Rewe withdrew from the Swiss retail market, two years after entering it, though it remained present through the Transgourmet joint venture with Coop.

== Country ranking in 2006 ==
Country	No. of stores	Sales (million euros)
Germany	8939	31220 M€
Austria	1901	4618 M€
Italy	337	1736 M€
France*	–	1140 M€
Romania	65	1050 M€
Switzerland*	22	904 M€
Czech Republic	245	844 M€
Poland	33	679 M€
Hungary	200	667 M€
Slovakia	117	274 M€
Croatia	50	215 M€
Bulgaria	110	– M€
Russia	69	– M€
Ukraine	21	68 M€

- *Sales of retail activities

== Digital business ==
In 2013, the REWE Group founded a subsidiary named REWE Digital, which is responsible for all strategic online activities. The group also acquired the e-commerce platform vendor commercetools and ZooRoyal, an e-commerce website for animal food and pet supplies. In 2017 REWE Group announced to make additional investments in the billions in order to further digitalize their business. In 2020 REWE digital, for the first time, spun-off one of its business units and founded the independent company OC Fulfillment GmbH, vendor of the omnichannel fulfillment software-as-a-service platform fulfillmenttools. In 2021 REWE Group announced the inception of Paymenttools, provider of on- and offline payment solutions for retailers.

== Cassis de Dijon ==
In 1979, Rewe won a significant case in the European Court of Justice, the Cassis de Dijon case.
