= List of supermarket chains =

As of 2023, this is a list of supermarket chains, past and present, which operate or have branches in more than one country, whether under the parent corporation's name or another name. For supermarkets that are only in one country, see the breakdown by continent at the bottom of this page. Numbers are provided as the largest reported, and are largely inaccurate.

== International ==
Company	Headquarters	Served countries (besides the headquarters)	Map	Number of locations	Number of employees
7-Eleven	Japan; United States	Australia, Canada, China, Cambodia, Denmark, Hong Kong, Israel, Macau, Malaysia, Mexico, Norway, Philippines, Singapore, South Korea, Sweden, Taiwan, Thailand		85,000	170,000
Aeon	Japan	Australia, Cambodia, China, Hong Kong, India, Indonesia, Laos, Malaysia, Mongolia, Philippines, South Korea, Taiwan, Thailand, Vietnam		20,008	560,000+
Ahold Delhaize	Netherlands	Belgium (as Albert Heijn and Delhaize), Czech Republic (as Albert), Greece (as Alfa-Beta Vassilopoulos), Indonesia (as Super Indo), Netherlands (as Albert Heijn, Gall&Gall and Etos), Luxembourg (as Delhaize), Portugal (as Pingo Doce), Romania (as Mega Image), Serbia (as Maxi), United States (as Food Lion, Giant, Hannaford, Stop & Shop)		7,659	375,000
Aldi	Germany (Süd and Nord)	Australia (Süd), Austria (Süd as Hofer), China (Süd), Hungary (Süd), Ireland (Süd), Italy (Süd), Slovenia (Süd as Hofer), Switzerland (Süd), United Kingdom (Süd), United States (Süd), Belgium (Nord), France (Nord), Luxembourg (Nord), Netherlands (Nord), Poland (Nord), Portugal (Nord), Spain (Nord), United States (Nord branded as Trader Joe's)		13,485 (14,068 if including Trader Joe's or 14,293 if including Aldi, Trader Joe's, Winn-Dixie and Harveys)	291,038
Edeka	Germany	Denmark		13,646	381,000
Extra	Germany				9,700
Minimal	Germany	Poland		1,500	
Auchan	France	Spain, Luxembourg, Italy, Portugal, Poland, Romania, Hungary, Russia, Ukraine, Taiwan, Senegal, Ivory Coast, Mauritania, Tadjikistan, Tunisia		2,896	160,407
Biedronka	Poland	Poland, Slovakia		3,900	85,000
Big C	Thailand	Laos, Cambodia, Vietnam, Hong Kong		1,234	27,000
Billa	Austria	Bulgaria, Czech Republic, Slovakia		3,645	76,174
BİM	Turkey	Morocco, Egypt		10,330 or 13,525	37,439
Carrefour	France	Algeria, Argentina, Armenia, Bahrain, Belgium, Brazil, Cameroon, China, Cyprus, Dominican Republic, Egypt, Georgia, Indonesia, Irak, Israel, Italy, Ivory Coast, Jordan, Kenya, Kuwait, Lebanon, Madagascar, Mauritius, Morocco, Oman, Pakistan ("Hyper Star"), Poland, Qatar, Romania, Saudi Arabia, Senegal, Spain, Taiwan, The Bahamas, Tunisia, Turkey, Uganda, United Arab Emirates		14,000	319,565
Champion	France	Belgium, Spain, Poland, Greece, Turkey, Argentina, Brazil		1,000	45,000
Casino	France	Argentina (Grupo Éxito), Brazil (GPA), Cameroon (Bao), Colombia (Grupo Éxito), Uruguay (Grupo Éxito)		10,800	196,307
Central Group	Thailand	Indonesia, Japan, Malaysia, Maldives, Sri Lanka, Vietnam, Denmark (under Illum), Germany (under KaDeWe, Oberpollinger and Alsterhaus), Ireland (under Brown Thomas), Italy (under La Rinascente), Netherlands (under De Bijenkorf), Switzerland (under Globus), United Kingdom (under Selfridges)			80,000
CBA	Hungary	Bulgaria, Croatia, Czech Republic, Lithuania, Poland, Romania, Serbia, Slovakia		5,203	30,000
Cencosud	Chile	Argentina, Brazil, Colombia, Peru		1,471	126,530
Chedraui	Mexico	United States		262	38,000
Conad	Italy	Albania, China, Kosovo, Malta, San Marino		3,410	32,000
Co-op Atlantic	Atlantic Canada				
Coop amba	Denmark			1,200	36,000+
Coop Hungary	Hungary			5,000	32,000
Coop Italia	Italy	San Marino		1,444	56,682
Coop Nederlands	Netherlands			242	
Coop Norge	Norway				2,564
Coop (Puerto Rico)	Puerto Rico				
Coop (Sweden)	Sweden			800 or 850	
Co-op	United Kingdom			2,564	
Coop	Switzerland	Liechtenstein		2,478	90,307
Costco	United States	Australia, Canada, Japan, Mexico, South Korea, Spain, Sweden, Taiwan, United Kingdom, France, China, Puerto Rico, New Zealand, Iceland		861	316,000
Crai	Italy	Albania, Malta, San Marino		3,444	18,000
Denner	Switzerland	Liechtenstein		860	
Dunnes	Ireland	Spain, United Kingdom, Portugal		138	15,000
Leclerc	France	Andorra, Poland, Portugal, Réunion, Slovenia, Spain		1,494	133,000
Géant Casino	France	Martinique, Djibouti, Uruguay, Qatar, Tunisia, Guadeloupe, Guyane, Wallis-et-Futuna, Libya		281	133,000
Dominick's	United States			116	18,000
e-mart	South Korea	Mongolia, Vietnam		183	
Eataly	Italy	Brazil, Canada, France, Germany, Japan, Kuwait, Qatar, Russia, Saudi Arabia, South Korea, Sweden, Turkey, United Arab Emirates, United Kingdom, United States		45	
EuroSpin	Italy	Slovenia, Croatia, Malta		1,143	7,000
Famila	Germany	Italy (franchisee of Selex)		235	6,600
FamilyMart	Japan	China, Indonesia, Malaysia, Philippines, Taiwan, Thailand, Vietnam		24,941	16,601
Fresh Mart	Thailand			600	
Freshmart	Canada				
Four Square supermarkets	New Zealand	Australia		224	
H-E-B	United States	Mexico		420+	100,000
Intermarché	France	Belgium, Portugal, Poland, Monaco		2,496	140,000
Isetan	Japan	China, Malaysia, Singapore, Taiwan, Thailand		28	
Ito-Yokado	Japan	China		178	
Jeronimo Martins	Portugal	Colombia branded as ARA, Poland branded as Biedronka		4,900+	123,458
Kaufland	Germany	Bulgaria, Croatia, Czech Republic, Montenegro, Moldova, Poland, Romania, Slovakia		1,500+	73,000
Kesko	Finland	Belarus, Estonia, Latvia, Lithuania, Norway, Russia, Sweden		2,000	22,476
Konzum	Croatia	Bosnia and Herzegovina, Serbia (branded as Idea)		700+	10,000+
Landmark Group	United Arab Emirates			2,400	55,000+
Lidl	Germany	Austria, Belgium, Bulgaria, Croatia, Cyprus, Czech Republic, Denmark, Estonia, Finland, France, Greece, Hungary, Ireland, Italy, Latvia, Lithuania, Luxembourg, Malta, Netherlands, Poland, Portugal, Romania, Serbia, Slovakia, Slovenia, Spain, Sweden, Switzerland, United Kingdom, United States		12,200	360,000
Lotte Mart	South Korea	China, Indonesia, Vietnam		175 or 199	
Lulu Hypermarket	United Arab Emirates	Bahrain, Saudi Arabia, Kuwait, Oman, Qatar, Egypt, India, Yemen, Indonesia		238	57,000
Makro (SHV Holdings)		Argentina, Brazil, Colombia, Venezuela		107	6,655
Makro (CP All)	Thailand	Cambodia, China, India, Myanmar		145	14,500
Maxima Group	Lithuania	Latvia, Estonia, Bulgaria (branded as T-Market), Poland (branded as Stokrotka)		1,326	31,569
Maxvalu Tokai	Japan	Thailand (branded as MaxValu and MaxValu Tanjai)			
Meny	Norway	Denmark		300	15,000
Mercator	Slovenia	Bosnia and Herzegovina, Croatia, Montenegro, Serbia		1,428	20,300
Mercator-S	Serbia			321	8,124
Metro	Germany	Argentina, Austria, Belgium, Brazil, Bulgaria, Cambodia, China, Colombia, Croatia, Czech Republic (as Makro), France, Greece, Hungary, India, Indonesia, Italy, Japan, Malaysia, Moldova, Morocco, Myanmar, Netherlands (as Makro), Pakistan, Peru, Philippines, Poland (as Makro), Portugal (as Makro), Romania, Russia, Serbia, Slovakia, South Africa, South Korea, Spain (as Makro), Taiwan, Thailand, Turkey, Ukraine, United Kingdom, United States, Venezuela		773	118,000
Migros	Switzerland	Liechtenstein, France, Germany (as tegut…)		1,066	97,541
Migros Türk	Turkey	Kyrgyzstan		1,156	26,779
MPreis	Austria	Italy		257	6,100
Netto Marken-Discount	Denmark	Germany, Poland, United Kingdom, Sweden, Lithuania, Latvia, Estonia, Norway, Sweden, Iceland, Faroe Islands, Greenland		4,270	84,000
Netto (Denmark)	Denmark	Germany, Poland, Sweden, United Kingdom		1,730	7,000
Netto (France)	France	Portugal		1,730	7,000
Netto UK	United Kingdom			193 (original) and 16 (revival)	7,000
Netto (Les Mousquetaires)	France	Poland, Portugal		360+	
Northern	Canada	USA (Alaska)		213	6,805
PARKnSHOP	Hong Kong	China, Macau		250+	9,000
Parkson	Malaysia	China, Vietnam, Laos, Indonesia and Myanmar		131	
Penny	Germany	Austria, Bulgaria, Hungary, Italy, Czech Republic, Romania		3,844	43,773
Prisma	Finland	Estonia, Russia		90	37,283
REMA 1000	Norway	Denmark		980	20,252
Rimi Baltic	Latvia	Estonia, Lithuania		291	
Selex	Italy	San Marino		2,595	33,000
Selgros	Germany	Poland, Romania, Russia		98	14,400+
SISA	Italy	Greece			3,000
SPAR	Netherlands	Albania, Australia, Austria, Belgium, Botswana, China, Croatia, Czech Republic, Denmark, France, Germany, Greece, Hungary, India, Ireland, Italy, Japan, Mauritius, Montenegro, Namibia, Norway, Pakistan, Poland, Romania, Russia, Slovenia, South Africa, Spain, Sri Lanka, Portugal, Switzerland, United Kingdom, Ukraine, Zambia, Zimbabwe		13,623	410,000
Stockmann	Finland	Estonia, Latvia, Russia		483	9,734
SuperValu	Canada				
SuperValu	Ireland	Spain, United Kingdom (Northern Ireland)		223	14,500
SuperValu	United States			2,150	
SuperValue	New Zealand			44	
Tesco	United Kingdom	Czech Republic, Hungary, Ireland, Slovakia, United Kingdom		4,572	340,000
Tía SA	Ecuador	Colombia, Uruguay		450	
TF Value Mart	Malaysia	Malaysia			
Veropoulos	Greece	North Macedonia, Serbia		201	6,000
Walmart	United States	Argentina, Brazil, Canada, Chile (as Lider), China, Costa Rica, El Salvador, Guatemala, Honduras, Mexico, Nicaragua, United Kingdom (as ASDA)		10,771	2,100,000
Wellcome	Hong Kong	Philippines, Taiwan		280	
Whole Foods Market	United States	Canada, United Kingdom		500+	91,000
Woolworths	Australia	New Zealand		1,111	225,000
A&P	United States			16,000	28,500
Albertsons	United States			2,253	325,000
Barber's Super Market	United States				
BI-LO	United States				13,000
BI-LO	Australia			180	13,600
Byerly's	United States			28	3,900
Cub	United States			106	1,000
Remke Markets	United States			5	100+
Giant Food Stores	United States			193	35,000+
Grand Union	United States			11	
Food City	United States			153	16,000
Food Lion	United States			1,055	82,000+
FOODWAY Discount Foods	United States			1,103	88,000+
Ingles	United States			198	26,000
Jewel	United States			189	
Jewel Food Stores	Australia			130	
Kohl's	United States			1,165	99,000
Kowalski's	United States			11	
Kroger	United States			2,719	465,000
Piggly Wiggly	United States			499	
Safeway	United States	Canada, United Kingdom, Australia (rebranded as Woolworths in 2008), West Germany, Mexico, Saudi Arabia, Jordan		912	250,000+ (including Albertsons)
Winn-Dixie	United States			546	41,000
Dominion	Canada				
Dominion Stores (Newfoundland)	Canada			11	
Sobey's	Canada			1,500	123,000
Provigo	Canada				5,700
Real Canadian Superstore	Canada			120	
Valu-mart	Canada			27	
IGA	United States	Canada, Australia, Philippines, Dominica		nearly 5,000	
IGA (Australia)	Australia			1,400	
IGA (Canada)	Australia				
Metro	Canada			953 grocery stores and 648 drugstores (1,601 altogether)	90,000
Maxi (Canada)	Canada			153	10,000
Delhaize Serbia	Serbia			482	12,399
ICA Gruppen	Sweden	Latvia, Norway, Lithuania, Estonia			24,000
Norma	Germany	France, Czech Republic, Austria		1,300+	14,679
PLUS	Netherlands			270	
Ahold	Netherlands	Poland, Belgium, Germany		3,206	236,000
Coopérative U	France	Andorra, Burkina Faso, Benin, Cameroon, Ivory Coast, Guinea, Mauritius, Madagascar, Morocco, Senegal		1,726	
Konsum	Germany				
Kooperativa Förbundet	Sweden				
ASDA	United Kingdom			829	145,000
Budgens	United Kingdom				
Happy Shopper	United Kingdom				
Marks & Spencer	United Kingdom	Serbia, Singapore, Malaysia		1,463	72,316
Victor Value	United Kingdom			217	
Sainsbury's	United Kingdom			1,442	171,000
Waitrose	United Kingdom	Great Britain and the Channel Islands		329	52,590
Ralphs	United States				
Smith's Food and Drug	United States			164	22,000
Vons	United States			193	44,000
Morrisons	United Kingdom			497	110,000
Colruyt	Belgium				24,287
GB	Belgium			58	
Ed	France			916	10,000+
Leader Price	France	Djibouti, Cameroon, Vanuatu, Guinea, Togo, Cape Verde, Mauritania, Serbia, Morocco, Saint Martin, Lebanon, French Guiana, Belgium, Egypt, Martinique, United Arab Emirates, Madagascar, Saudi Arabia, Jordan, Kuwait, Italy, Guadeloupe, Réunion		215 or 545	
Franprix	France			641	
Inno	Belgium			16	
Monoprix	France	Belgium, Luxembourg, Qatar, Tunisia, United Arab Emirates, Morocco, Mauritius, Lebanon, Andorra, Libya, Germany, Netherlands, Portugal, Sweden, Norway, Denmark, Spain		736	21,000+
Système U	France				
Uniprix	Canada				
Rainbow Foods	United States			40	
Fry's Food and Drug	United States			123	22,000
Amigo	Puerto Rico				
Econo	Puerto Rico			64	
Obs	Norway			31	
Bilka	Denmark				
Pueblo	Uruguay				
Safeway UK	United Kingdom				
Lucky Stores	United States			70	
Kwik Save	United Kingdom				
Somerfield	United Kingdom				50,000
Woolworths Group	Australia	New Zealand		1,824	201,000
Woolworths	New Zealand			245	18,000
Save-Mart	United States			293	23,000
Super de Boer	Netherlands			0	
Kmart	United States			8	
Carrs-Safeway	United States			24	
Genuardi's	United States			39	7,000+
Pavilions	United States			26	
Randalls	United States			32	16,000
Tom Thumb	United States			64	2,000+
Farmer Jack	United States			100	7,200
Meijer	United States			467	70,000
Spartan Stores	United States				17,500
Iceland	United Kingdom	Ireland, Czech Republic, Spain, Portugal, Malta, Norway		1,000+	28,853 and 18,315 (FTE)
FoodLand	United States			3,938	
Sobeys#Foodland	Canada				
Foodland	Australia			90 or 96	7,000+
Romeo's Retail Group	Australia			39	
Foodland Hawaii	United States			29 or 32	
Foodland Ontario	Canada				
Foodland (Thailand)	Thailand			22	
Loblaws	Canada				
Loeb	Canada				
Stater Bros.	United States			171	18,000
Bashas'	United States			118	9,085
QFC	United States			62	5,900
Raley's Supermarkets	United States			129	23,000
Wild Oats Markets	United States				
Coles	Australia			861	120,000+
Kmart Australia	Australia			325	40,000
Big W	Australia			177	18,000+
Myer	Australia			57	14,000+
Big Fresh	New Zealand			11	
Franklins	Australia			287	
Countdown	New Zealand			180	18,000+
Foodtown	New Zealand			0	
New World	New Zealand			140	
Pak'nSave	New Zealand			57	
Woolworths (New Zealand)	New Zealand			187	
C1000	Netherlands			500	
Jumbo	Netherlands	Belgium		705 or 740	
Jumbo Chile	Chile	Argentina, Colombia			25,769
Weingarten's	United States			70	
Gima	Romania				
Mega Image	Romania			806	9,741
Amigo Supermarkets	Puerto Rico				
Zellers	Canada			350 (86 within Hudson's Bay (2023))	
Zehrs	Canada			42	
XXL	Romania				
Profi	Romania			1,600	
Wegmans	United States			109	52,335
Esselunga	Italy			160	23,094
Standa	Italy			126	
Supermercado La Franco Italiana	Venezuela				
Happy Harry's	United States			76	
Great Food Hall	Hong Kong				
Taste	Hong Kong				
Gourmet	Hong Kong				
Real Atlantic Superstore	Canada			52	
Hannaford	United States			183	
Price Chopper	United States			128	24,000
Price Chopper	United States			55	10,000
Price Chopper (New Zealand)	New Zealand			17	
FreshCo	Canada			100	
Market of Choice	United States			12	1,000
Shaw's and Star Market	United States			145	
Star Market	United States			406	82,000+
Alfa-Beta Vassilopoulos	Greece			500	14,586
Supermercados Gigante	Mexico			199	
CTown Supermarkets	United States			200	
The Food Emporium	United States			13	
Key Food	United States			324	
Shop-Rite (Canada)	Canada			65	
Shop-Rite (Isle of Man)	Isle of Man			9	600+
Shoprite Holdings Ltd	South Africa	Namibia, Zambia, Zimbabwe, Uganda		3,326	153,000+
ShopRite (United States)	United States			321	
Waldbaum's	United States			140	
Fairway Market	United States			4	
Fairway Markets	Canada				700+
Fareway	United States			131	12,000+
Trader Joe's	United States			569	50,000+
Kooperativa Förbundet	Sweden				
RIMI	Norway			279	
REWE	Germany			3,300	170,000
REWE Group	Germany	France, Ukraine, Switzerland, Poland, Croatia, Romania, Russia, Bulgaria, Slovakia, Hungary, Czech Republic, Italy, Austria		12,109	363,633
Metro AG	Germany	Moldova, Slovakia, Kazakhstan, Serbia, Pakistan, Portugal, Croatia, Bulgaria, Austria, Czech Republic, Hungary, Netherlands, Argentina, Ukraine, Poland, Romania, Turkey, Spain, Italy, Russia, France		674	91,201
PrisXtra	Sweden			5	
Your Independent Grocer	Canada			100+	
Lojas Americanas	Brazil			1,945	18,775
Bompreço	Brazil			90	
Cold Storage	Singapore	Malaysia		50	15,000+
NTUC FairPrice	Singapore			260	
Giant	Malaysia	Singapore, Brunei, Cambodia, Indonesia, Vietnam		80 (40 store outlets and 40 Giant Mini stores)	
Giant Markets	United States			12	1,000+
Giant Open Air	United States			26 full-line grocery stores and 43 "Tinee Giant" convenience stores (69 altogether)	
Save-A-Lot	United States			900	
Bruno's	United States			300	
Giant Food (Landover)	United States			165 stores and 153 pharmacies (318 altogether)	22,000
Tops Friendly Markets	United States			154 (149 supermarkets, 5 Tops Xpress stores)	14,000
Tops Supermarket	Thailand			235	
99 Ranch Market	United States			52	
Quinnsworth	Ireland				
Pingo Doce	Portugal			470	
Booths	United Kingdom			27	2,870
Hong Kong Supermarket	United States			6	
Food Basics	Canada			142	
A&P Canada	Canada			135	34,000+
No Frills	Canada			271	
Giant Eagle	United States			496	37,000
Seafood City	United States	Canada		36	
Shun Fat Supermarket	United States			36	
Publix	United States			1,361	240,000
EG Group	United Kingdom	Germany, France, Belgium, Netherlands, Luxembourg, Italy, United States, Australia, Ireland			50,000+
Shoppers Food & Pharmacy	United States			25	300
Farm Fresh Food & Pharmacy	United States			4	
Acme Markets	United States			162	
Super Saver Foods	United States				
Hy-Vee	United States			285	93,000
City Market	United States				
City Market (Mexico)	Mexico				
Dillons	United States			94	11,500
Hilander Foods	United States			7	
JayC Food Stores	United States			64	300
City Market (US grocery store chain)	United States			38	
Owen's Market	United States				
Carr's	United Kingdom				
Delhaize Group	Belgium	Czech Republic, Luxembourg, Greece, Romania, Serbia, United States, Indonesia		3,534	
Real	Germany	Poland		3,534	
Castorama	France	Poland		191	
Nomi	Poland			20	1,800
MediaMarkt	Germany	Austria, Belgium, Hungary, Italy, Luxembourg, Netherlands, Poland, Spain, Switzerland, Turkey		1,006	
IKEA	Sweden	Norway, Denmark, Switzerland, Germany, Japan, Australia, Hong Kong, Canada, Austria, Netherlands, Singapore, Spain, France, Iceland, Saudi Arabia, Belgium, Kuwait, United States, United Kingdom, Italy, Hungary, Poland, Czech Republic, Serbia, United Arab Emirates, Slovakia, Taiwan, Finland, Malaysia, China, Russia, Greece, Israel, Portugal, Turkey, Cyprus, Romania, Ireland, Dominican Republic, Bulgaria, Thailand, Macau, Lithuania, Puerto Rico, Egypt, Qatar, Croatia, Indonesia, Jordan, South Korea, Morocco, Bahrain, India, Latvia, Estonia, Ukraine, Mexico, Philippines, Slovenia, Chile, Oman, Colombia		445 or 479	219,000
Office Depot	United States			960	20,000+
Albert Czech Republic	Czech Republic			335	10,605
Biedronka	Poland			3,283	70,000
Scott's Food & Pharmacy	United States			18	
Mega Maxi	Serbia				
Pekabeta	Serbia				
C-market	Serbia	Yugoslavia, Serbia and Montenegro			
Extra	Norway			535	
Coop Forum	Sweden			3	
Pressbyrån	Sweden			300	
Continente	Portugal			519 or 582	28,150
Sonae	Portugal				53,794
Ultra Food & Drug	Canada				
Tesco Ireland	Ireland			164	14,500
Caprabo	Spain	Andorra			
Julius Meinl	Austria				845
Centra	Ireland			560	11,000+
The Cope	Ireland				110
Fortinos	Canada			23	
Mousquetaires Group	France	Belgium, Portugal, Poland, Réunion, Martinique, French Guiana, Guadeloupe, Mayotte, Cameroon, Republic of the Congo, Gabon, Mauritius, Madagascar, Lebanon, Georgia		5,074+	112,000
Alcampo	Spain				
Daiei	Japan			3,000	6,979
Aurrerá	Mexico				
Soriana	Mexico			606	93,700
Comercial Mexicana	Mexico				38,930
Kingfisher plc	United Kingdom			1,300	80,000
S Group	Finland				37,283
Overwaitea Foods	Canada			15	
Kopeyka	Russia			624 or 660	
Perekrestok	Russia			980-990	30,400
Pyaterochka	Russia			19,164	141,200
Seiyu Group	Japan			328 or 329	34,600
Albert Heijn	Netherlands	Belgium		1,056	100,000
Save-On-Foods	Canada			177	21,842
Nakumatt	Kenya			65	5,500+
Uchumi	Kenya			6	50
Coin	Italy				
UPIM	Italy			150	
Watsons	Hong Kong	Mainland China, Indonesia, Macau, Malaysia, Philippines, Singapore, Taiwan, Thailand, Turkey, Ukraine, United Arab Emirates, Vietnam, Saudi Arabia, Qatar		9,500	
Circle K	United States	Cambodia, Canada, China, Costa Rica, Denmark, Egypt, Estonia, Guam, Honduras, Hong Kong, Indonesia, Ireland, Latvia, Lithuania, Macau, Malaysia, Mexico, Morocco, Netherlands, New Zealand, Norway, Philippines, Poland, South Africa, Sweden, United Arab Emirates, Vietnam		15,000+	40,000+
Hero	Indonesia			4,481	
Sogo	Japan	China, Hong Kong, Taiwan, Indonesia, Malaysia, Singapore, Thailand, United Kingdom			2,845
Yaohan	Japan	Hong Kong, Macau, Malaysia, Singapore, Thailand, Indonesia			
Meidi-Ya	Japan	Singapore		23	
UNY	Japan	China, Hong Kong			
Flemings	Australia			100	
Food For Less	Australia				
Lotus's	Thailand	Malaysia		1,967	
Krónan	Iceland			26	
Action Supermarkets	Australia			80	
Compre Bem	Brazil				
Extra Hipermercados	Brazil			76	
GPA	Brazil			1,429	84,464
Sendas	Brazil				
Hagkaup	Iceland				700
Irma	Denmark				65
Fantastico	Bulgaria			48	3,100+
Casa Ley	Mexico			300	22,000
Calimax	Mexico			117	6,000
Carulla	Colombia			156	
Salling Group	Denmark	Germany, Poland		1,700+	60,000
føtex	Denmark			76	
Thrifty Foods	Canada			27	5,000
Minipreço	Portugal			443	
Piccadilly	Bulgaria			13	
Miracle Mart	Canada			31	
Masoutis	Greece			388	
Farm Boy	Canada			50 or 51	
Steinberg's	Canada			31	
Supermercados Peruanos	Peru			103	6,000
Wong	Peru			18	
China Resources	Mainland China	Hong Kong			
Safeway (Australia)	Australia			187	
Roelf Vos Supermarkets	Australia			13	500
Robinsons Supermarket	Philippines			274	
SM Retail	Philippines				
citysuper	Hong Kong	Taiwan, Mainland China		41	
Kansai Super	Japan			60	
Extra Foods	Canada			4	
Globus Department Store	Switzerland				3,400
Globus Holding	Germany	Czech Republic, Russia, Luxembourg			3,400
Globus	Germany	Czech Republic, Russia, Luxembourg		165	44,900
Allied Stores	United States			226	
T&T Supermarket	Canada	United States		38	
Match	Belgium	Luxembourg, France		217	
Tegut	Germany			300+	7,700
Comet	United Kingdom				
The Mall Group	Thailand				13,000
Tengelmann Group	Germany				65,050
Coto Supermarkets	Argentina				14,000
Houchens Industries	United States				15,000+
Warmans	Australia			42	
c!ty'super	Hong Kong	Taiwan, China		41	
Azbuka Vkusa	Russia			90	
Dixy	Russia			2,650	26,000+
Lenta	Russia			2,800+	35,100
Praktiker	Germany	Luxembourg, Albania, Bulgaria, Greece, Hungary, Poland, Romania, Turkey, Ukraine		400+	19,523
Tinex	Macedonia			34	1,000
The Warehouse Group	New Zealand	Australia		249	12,000
Coles Group	Australia			1,858	115,000
Metcash	Australia			6,531	
FoodWorks	Australia			332	
Pick-N-Pay Supermarkets	United States			10	
Pick n Pay	South Africa	Lesotho, Eswatini, Nigeria, Botswana, Zambia and Zimbabwe		2,279 (957 company-owned and 747 franchised)	90,000 (61,000 at Pick n Pay and 29,000 at Boxer)
Woolworths Metro	Australia	New Zealand		101	
Newmart	Australia			18	
Shoeys	Australia			34	

== See also ==
- List of convenience stores
- List of hypermarkets
- List of department stores by country
- List of superstores
