= List of supermarket chains in Germany =

This is a list of current German supermarket chains.

== German supermarket chains ==
Name	Stores in Germany	Type of store	Parent/operator
Aldi Süd	c. 2,000	Discounter	Siepmann Stiftung
Aldi Nord	c. 2,200	Discounter	Jakobus-, Markus- und Lukas-Stiftung
Alnatura	155	Organic supermarket	Alnatura
Bio Company	58	Organic supermarket	Bio Company SE
CAP Markets	100+	Supermarket	GDW Süd eG
Combi	c. 190	Supermarket	Bünting
Denns BioMarkt	378	Organic supermarket	dennree GmbH
diska	100+	Supermarket	Edeka
Edeka	6,438	Supermarket/Hypermarket	Edeka
Feneberg	72	Supermarket	Feneberg Lebensmittel GmbH
famila	112	Hypermarket	Bartels-Langness / Bünting
Globus	65	Hypermarket	Globus
HIT	100+	Supermarket	Dohle Handelsgruppe
K+K Klaas & Kock	210+	Supermarket	K+K Klaas & Kock B.V. & Co. KG
Kaufland	790+	Hypermarket	Schwarz Gruppe
Lidl	3,250+	Discounter	Schwarz Gruppe
Marktkauf	112	Hypermarket	Edeka
Mix Markt	198	Supermarket	Mix GmbH Lebensmittelhandel
Netto Marken-Discount	4,444	Discounter	Edeka
Norma	1,330+	Discounter	NORMA Lebensmittelfilialbetrieb Stiftung & Co. KG
Penny	c. 2,123	Discounter	REWE Group
REWE	c. 3,800	Supermarket/Hypermarket	REWE Group
Netto	340	Discounter	Salling Group
tegut...	c. 300	Supermarket	Migros
V-Markt	40	Hypermarket	Georg Jos. Kaes GmbH
WASGAU	70+	Supermarket	WASGAU Produktions & Handels AG

== See also ==
- List of supermarket chains
- List of supermarket chains in Europe
