= Standa =

Italian department store chain

- Company type: Privately held company
- Founded: May 9, 1931
- Defunct: 2010
- Fate: Defunct
- Headquarters: Milan, Italy

Standa was an Italian chain of department stores.

== History ==
It was founded in 1931 as Magazzini Standard (Società Anonima Magazzini Standard) by a former executive of UPIM and subsequently renamed as Standa (acronym for Società Tutti Articoli Nazionali Dell'Abbigliamento). When it was bought by Montedison in 1966 it had 126 branches all over Italy. It was bought by Silvio Berlusconi in July 1988, through Fininvest, which in 1998 sold the "non-food" stores to the Coin due to a financial crisis. In 1999, the grocery store chain was disbanded and the stores sold by geographical location: the stores based in northern Italy were sold to REWE Group and those based in southern Italy were sold to Conad. The Standa trademark is now officially owned by REWE, which in 2009 rebranded its supermarkets as Billa.

In 2014 REWE sold its Standa/Billa supermarkets chain to the French retailer Carrefour.

A Standa store was opened by REWE in Cologne but closed in 2017.
