= Cheese and pickle sandwich =

British sandwich

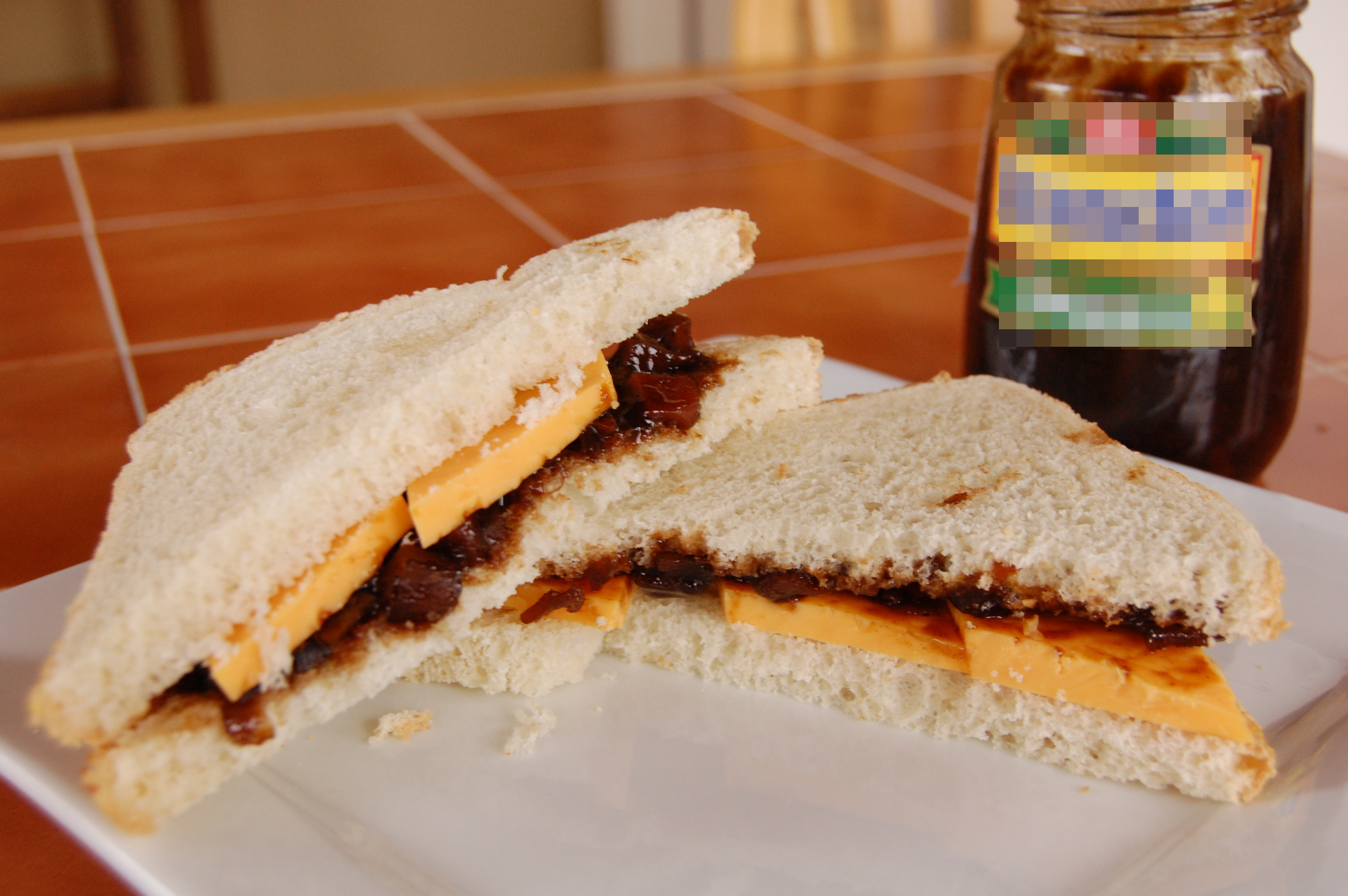
- A cheese and pickle sandwich, sliced in half
- Alternative names: Cheese and chutney sandwich, ploughman's sandwich
- Place of origin: United Kingdom
- Main ingredients: Bread, cheese (typically cheddar), Branston Pickle

A cheese and pickle sandwich (sometimes known as a cheese and chutney sandwich or a ploughman's sandwich from its resemblance to a ploughman's lunch) is a British sandwich. As its name suggests, it consists of sliced or grated cheese (typically cheddar) and pickled chutney (a sweet, vinegary chutney, the most popular brand being Branston), sandwiched between two slices of bread. The bread may be spread with butter or margarine, and the sandwich may include salad items like lettuce and rocket.

In an informal poll by the German supermarket chain Aldi the cheese and pickle sandwich was voted as Britain's favourite sandwich. Celebrity chefs including Jamie Oliver, Antony Worrall Thompson, and the Hairy Bikers have produced their own recipes for the sandwich. Oliver attributes the sandwich's popularity to the way in which "the crunch of the pickle perfectly complements the smooth softness of the cheese, and the vinegariness of the pickle balances the richness of the cheese."

== See also ==
- List of sandwiches
