= Easy-Way Store =

Grocery retailer in Tennessee, US

- Company type: Private
- Industry: Retail
- Founded: 1932; 94 years ago in Memphis, Tennessee, United States
- Founder: Pate Carter
- Defunct: April 27, 2018
- Fate: Bankrupted
- Website: www.easywayproduce.com

Easy-Way Store was a family-owned grocery chain in the Memphis area of Tennessee, United States.

Easy-Way specialized in produce. As of 2009, it operated one full-service grocery store in Memphis and seven produce-only locations in Memphis and its suburbs. It was known locally for having orange storefronts.

== History ==
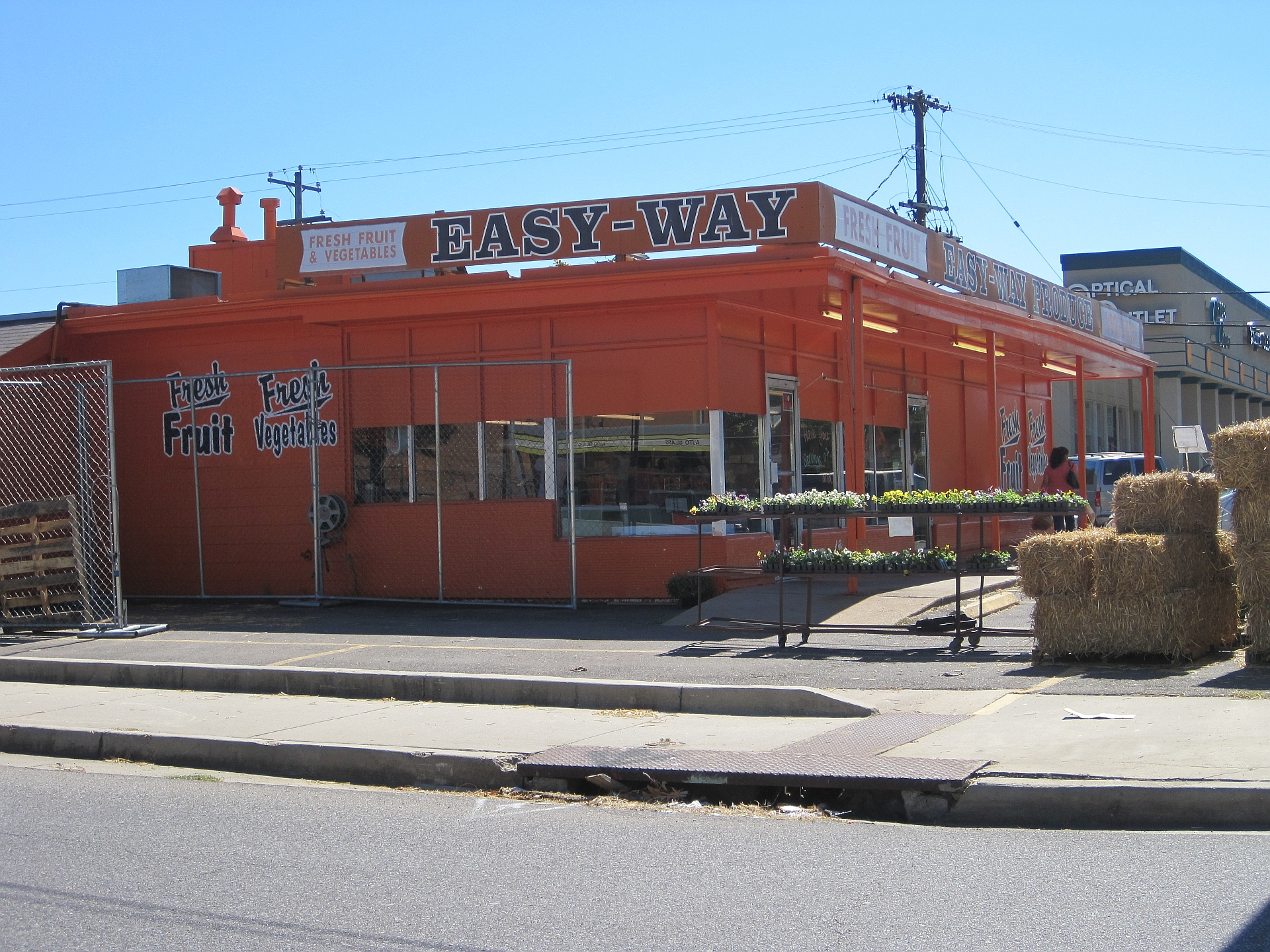
Easy-Way Store at Mendenhall Road

The first Easy-Way store was opened in downtown Memphis in 1932 by Pate Carter. In December 2003, the downtown store was damaged in a fire that destroyed an adjacent grocery store, but it had no structural damage, and reopened less than one month after the fire.

Produce-only stores were first added in the early 1970s. In 2001 the company built a 54,000-square-foot (5,000 m^{2}) warehouse and distribution center, which is the company headquarters and the base of a wholesale operation that supplies fruits and vegetables to many local restaurants, as well as to competing grocers when their inventories run low. The retail stores did not add Sunday operating hours until 2008.

Ownership and management of the business have remained in the Carter family. Its current owners, brothers Barry Carter Jr. and David Carter, are grandsons of the founder. In 2005, David Carter attributed the company's long survival in the face of competition from larger stores to the convenience of its neighborhood store locations, its ability to deliver fresher produce than larger stores, its responsiveness to customer suggestions, and the absence of a corporate bureaucracy. The chain has been a winner in the "Most Appealing Produce" category in Memphis Commercial Appeal reader polls.

David Carter died on January 20, 2014, in the Easy Way Warehouse in Memphis, Tennessee due to a self-inflicted gunshot wound.

The last store closed on April 27, 2018.
