= Minimal (supermarket) =

German and Polish supermarket chain

miniMAL

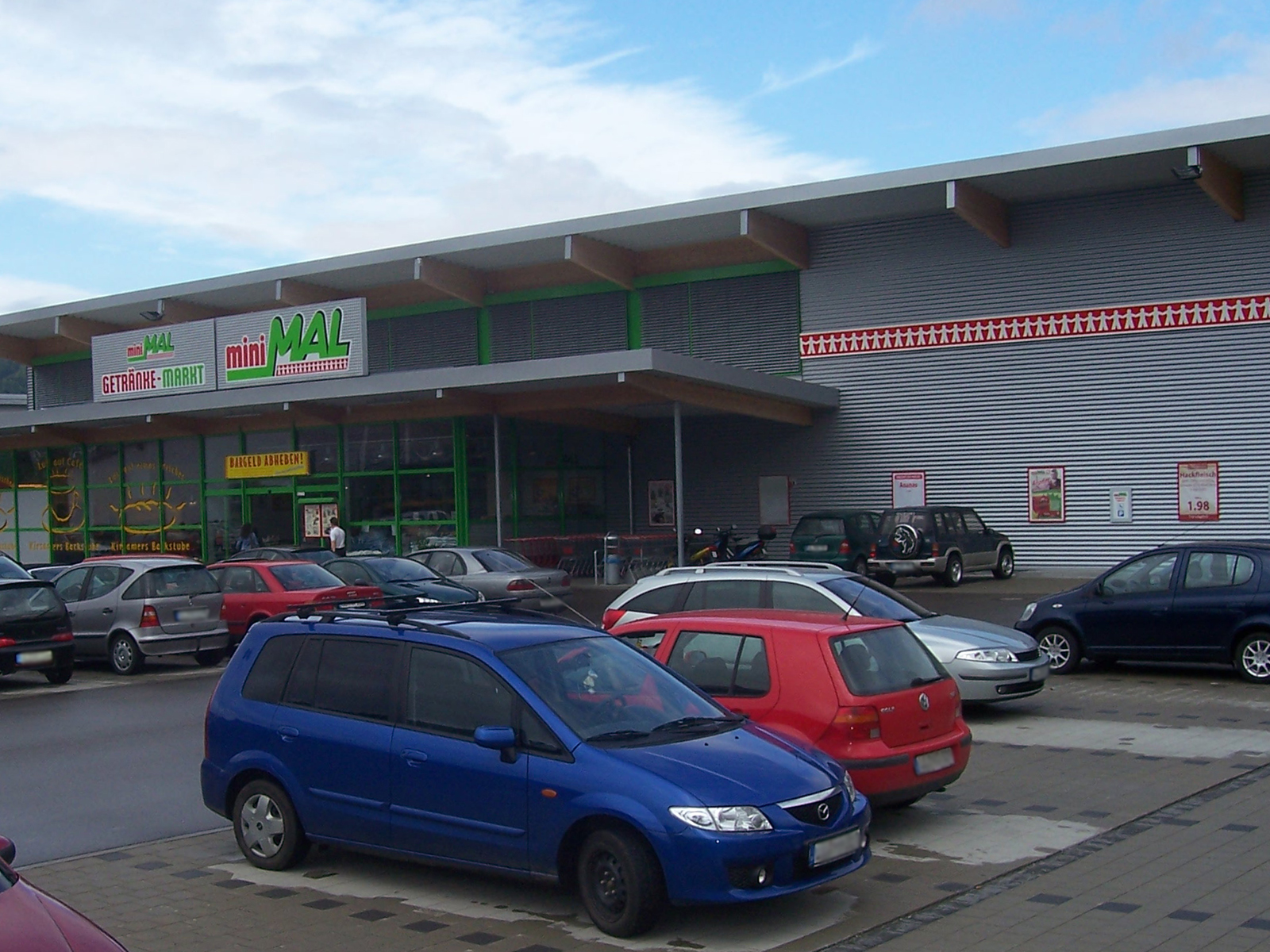
- miniMAL branch in Blaubeuren, Germany
- Type: Subsidiary
- Industry: Supermarkets
- Founded: 1973; 53 years ago in West Germany
- Founder: Leibbrand Group
- Defunct: 2006
- Successors: REWE (German stores); Billa (Polish stores)
- Number of locations: 1,500 (2004-05)
- Area served: Poland; Germany
- Parent: REWE Group

Minimal was a German multinational supermarkets that was operated in Germany and Poland by Rewe Group until 2006.

== History ==
The first Minimal store was opened in 1973 by the Bad Homburg-based Leibbrand Group. The group, which also owned other retail chains such as HL-Markt, Penny Markt or toom, initially sold 50% of its assets to Rewe in 1974 and was bought out completely in 1989. The Minimal stores at first had a floor size of 800 to 1000 square metres, which was a considerable size at the time. Later stores had sales floors between 1200 and 1500 square metres. In 1990, the until-then West German chain expanded into the former GDR states; the first Minimal store in the East was opened in 1990 in Wanzleben in Saxony-Anhalt.

During the years 2004 and 2005, Rewe converted most of its small-footprint chains (such as HL Deutscher Supermarkt, Stüssgen, Kafu and Otto Mess) into Minimal stores. Since them, the name Minimal did not only encompass the larger branches, but also small stores with a floor size from 400 square metres. This resulted in about 1,500 supermarkets carrying the miniMAL branding.

In January 2006, Rewe Group decided to merge all its German full-service supermarket operations under a common brand name, independent of whether they had been chain stores or individually operated by co-operative members, of whom the latter already had been using the "Rewe" brand. The new branding strategy came into effect on the weekend of 25 September 2006, when 3,000 stores were switched over simultaneously, including all (German) Minimal stores as well as the few remaining branches of HL, Stüssgen and Otto Mess.

== Minimal in Poland ==
The first Polish branch of Minimal was opened in 1996. In late 2006, Rewe Group switched over the branding of the stores to their Billa brand, common in Austria.
