= Supermercado De Candido =

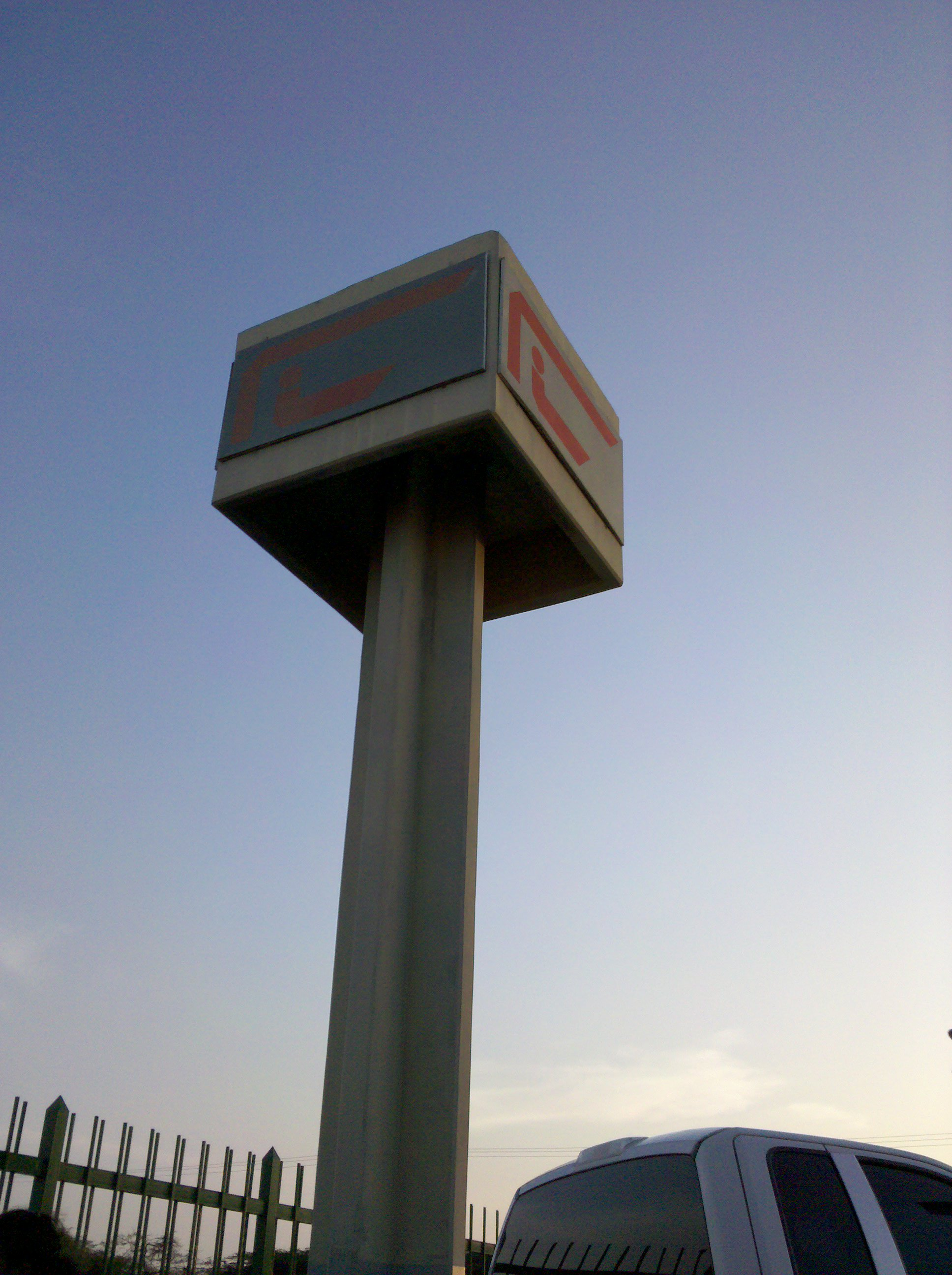
- Company type: Public
- Industry: Commerce
- Founded: 1950
- Headquarters: Paraguaná's Tax Free Zone, Falcón State, Venezuela
- Products: Commerce
- Revenue: ▲ Bs. ? billion (2006)
- Operating income: ▲ Bs. ? billion (2006)
- Net income: ▼ Bs. ? billion (2006)
- Number of employees: ??? (2006)
- Website: www.decandido.com

Supermercado De Candido is a chain of supermarkets, located in the Paraguaná Peninsula of Venezuela.

The supermarket company was established in 1950, when the Italian Prati Caruso brothers established it as Supermercado La Franco Italiana.

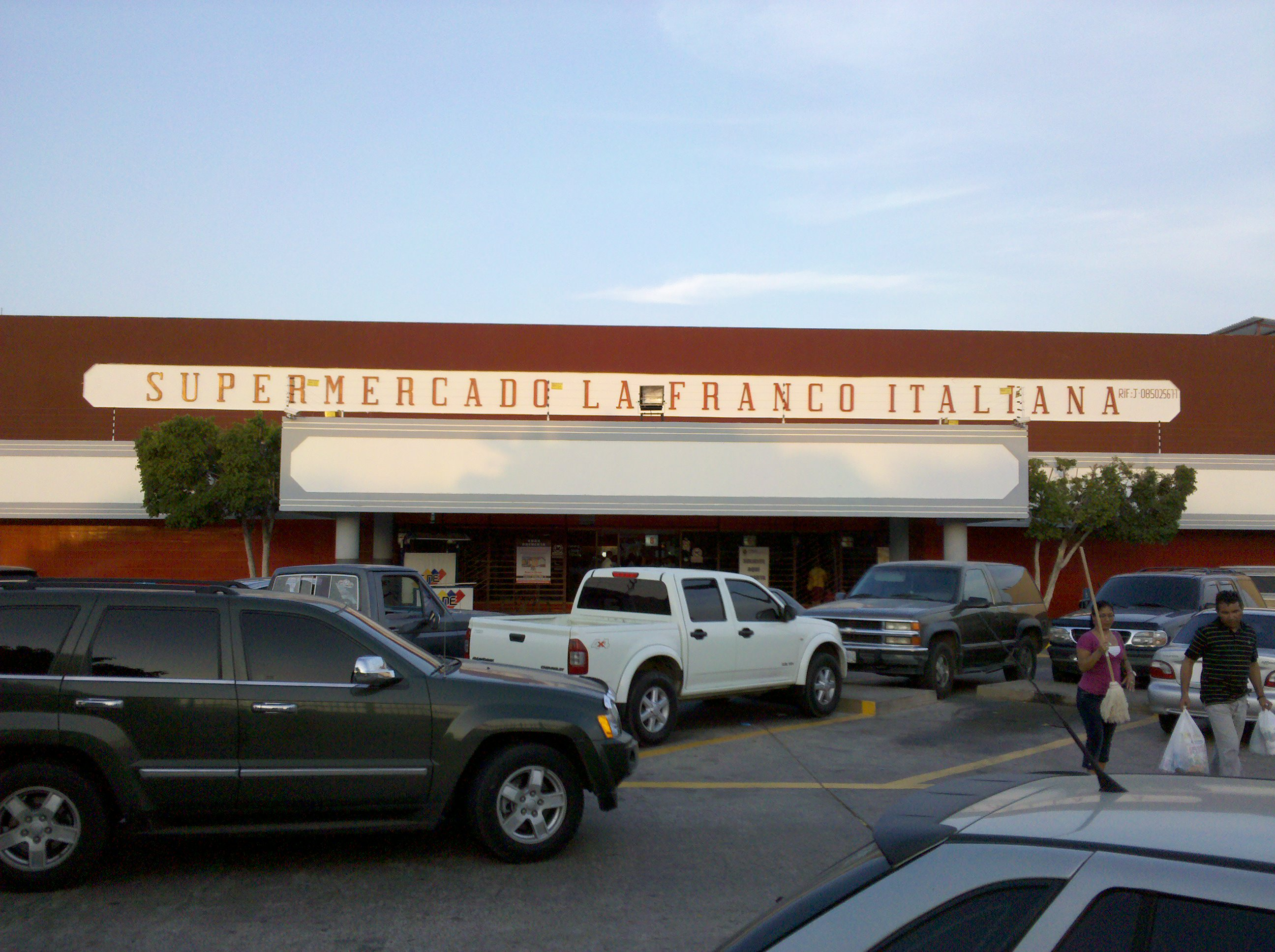
De Candido Supermarket (still named La Franco Italiana when this photo was taken), located in Punto Fijo.

During the company's first few years, growth was slow, but when petroleum companies Royal Dutch/Shell and Creole Petroleum Corporation merged the Paraguaná Peninsula experienced significant economic and population growth, inspiring La Franco Italiana to expand. In 1974 the company's name changed officially from La Franco Italiana to Supermercado La Franco Italiana S.A..

In 1989 the company inaugurated what was, as of 2003, the largest supermarket store in Venezuela.

Many people in the Paraguaná Peninsula still refer to the company as La Franco.

The supermarket got sold due to economic and security problems. It got sold to the company "De Candido" which has several supermarkets in the country. It is now called "De Candido".
