= Ploughman's lunch =

British lunch meal

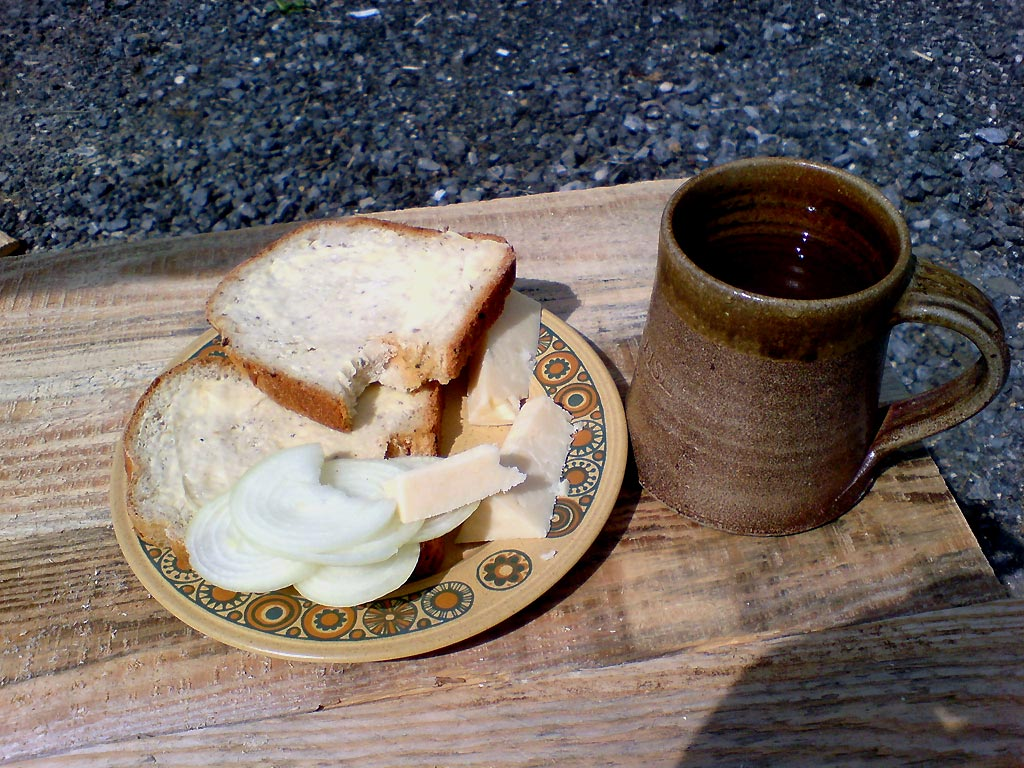
- A traditional, rustic ploughman's lunch consisting of buttered bread, cheese, a mug of ale, and raw onions
- Place of origin: United Kingdom
- Serving temperature: Cold
- Main ingredients: Bread, cheese, onion, pickle

A ploughman's lunch is an originally English cold meal based around bread, cheese, and fresh or pickled onions. Additional items can be added, such as ham, green salad, hard boiled eggs, and apple, and usual accompaniments are butter and a sweet pickle such as Branston. As its name suggests, it is most commonly eaten at lunchtime. It is particularly associated with pubs, and often served with beer; the saltiness of the cheese was noted to enhance the "relish of the beer".

Beer, bread, and cheese have been staples of the British diet since antiquity, and have been served together in inns for centuries. However, the specific term "ploughman's lunch" is believed to date from the 1950s, when the Cheese Bureau, a marketing body, began promoting it in pubs as a way to increase the sales of cheese, which had ceased to be rationed following the end of World War II. Its popularity increased as the Milk Marketing Board promoted the meal nationally throughout the 1960s. Around the same time Walkers released their "Cheese and Onion" flavour crisps which is based on the Ploughman's lunch to capitalise on the growing popularity of the meal due to the aforementioned promotion by the Milk board .

== History ==
Bread and cheese formed the basis of the diet of English rural labourers for centuries: skimmed-milk cheese, supplemented with small amounts of lard and/or butter, was their main source of fats and protein. In the absence of access to expensive seasonings, onions were the "favoured condiment", as well as providing a valuable source of vitamin C.

The reliance on cheese rather than meat protein was especially strong in the south of the country. As late as the 1870s, farmworkers in Devon were said to eat "bread and hard cheese at 2d. a pound, with cider very washy and sour" for their midday meal. While this diet was associated with rural poverty, it also gained associations with more idealised images of rural life. Anthony Trollope in The Duke's Children has a character comment that "a rural labourer who sits on the ditch-side with his bread and cheese and an onion has more enjoyment out of it than any Lucullus".

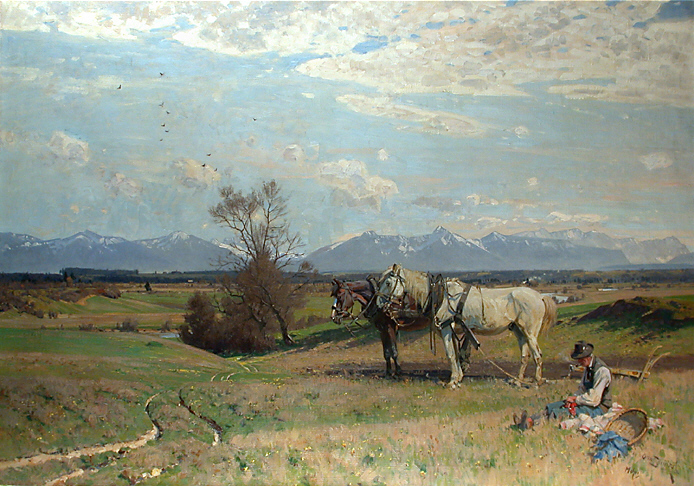
Ploughman and team, by German artist Otto Strützel. Ploughmen, like other farm labourers, generally ate their midday or afternoon meal in the fields.

While farm labourers usually carried their food with them to eat in the fields, similar food was for a long time served in public houses as a simple, inexpensive meal. In 1815, William Cobbett recalled how farmers going to market in Farnham, forty years earlier, would often add "2d. worth of bread and cheese" to the pint of beer they drank at the inn stabling their horses. In the 19th century the English fondness for serving cheese and bread with beer was noted, as "the very dryness and saltness heighten thirst, and therefore the relish of the beer". In the early 20th century, bread and cheese was still the only food available in many rural pubs: in 1932 Martin Armstrong described stopping at village inns for a lunch of bread, cheese and beer, noting that "On these occasions in country inns when bread, cheese and beer seem so extraordinarily good, the alternative is generally nothing; and compared with nothing bread, cheese, and beer are beyond compare".

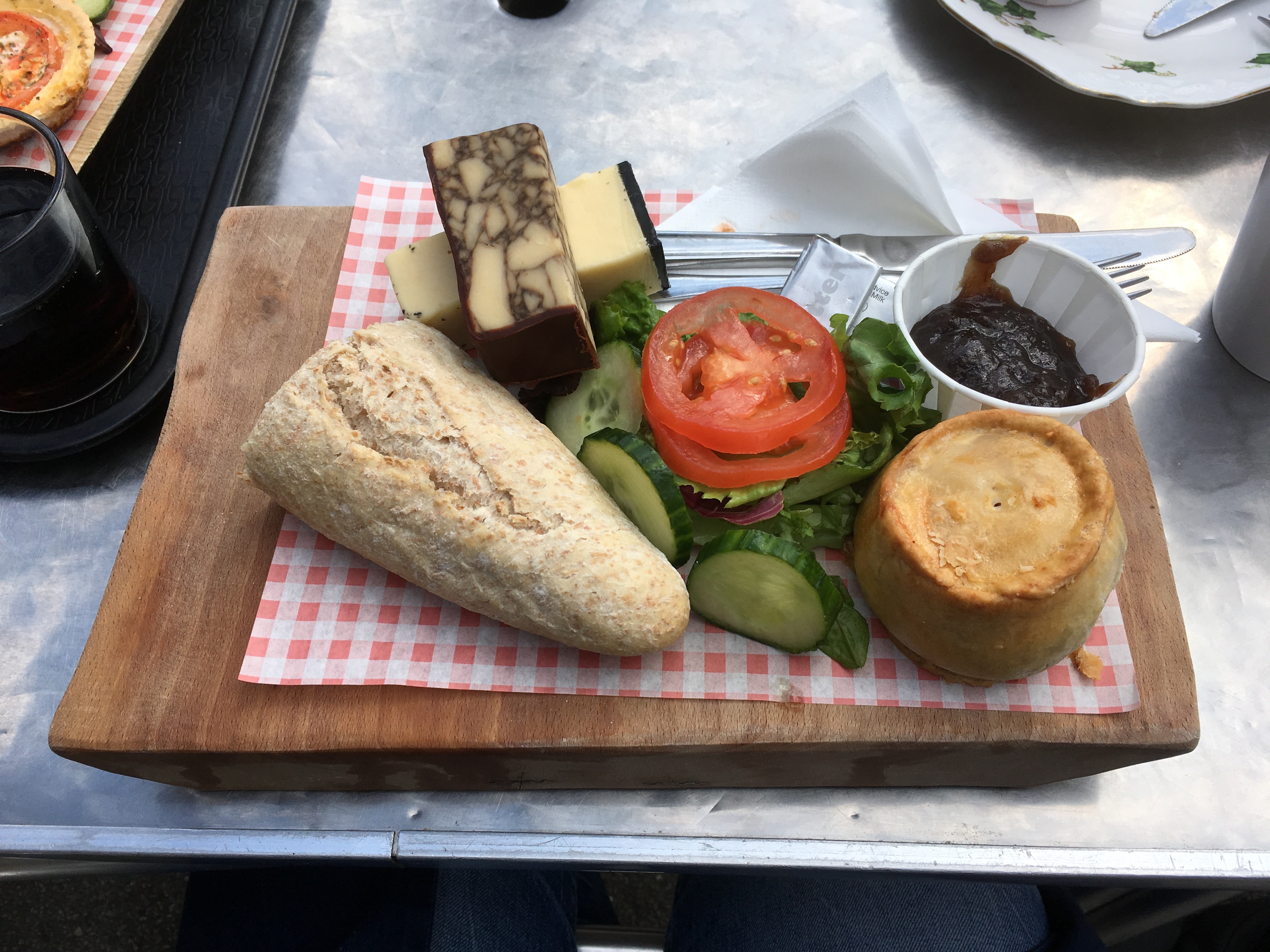
A more modern version of a ploughman's lunch consisting of bread, cheese, butter, salad, a pork pie, and chutney

While Oxford English Dictionary states the first recorded use of the phrase "ploughman's luncheon" occurred in 1837, from the Memoirs of the Life of Sir Walter Scott by John G. Lockhart, this stray early use may have meant merely the sum of its parts, "a lunch for a ploughman". The OED's next reference is from the July 1956 Monthly Bulletin of the Brewers' Society, which describes the activities of the Cheese Bureau, a marketing body affiliated with the J. Walter Thompson advertising agency. It describes how the Bureau

exists for the admirable purpose of popularising cheese and, as a corollary, the public house lunch of bread, beer, cheese and pickle. This traditional combination was broken by rationing; the Cheese Bureau hopes, by demonstrating the natural affinity of the two parties, to effect a remarriage.

By the 1950s, the traditional combination of bread, cheese, beer and onions was certainly being referred to by forms of the name later used to promote it. In 1956, author Adrian Bell reported: "There's a pub quite close to where I live where ... all you need say is, 'Ploughboy's Lunch, Harry, please'. And in a matter of minutes a tray is handed across the counter to you on which is a good square hunk of bread, a lump of butter and a wedge of cheese, and pickled onions, along with your pint of beer". Only a year later, in June 1957, another edition of the Monthly Bulletin of the Brewers' Society referred to a ploughman's lunch using that name, and said that it consisted of "cottage bread, cheese, lettuce, hard-boiled eggs, cold sausages and, of course, beer". The Glasgow newspaper The Bulletin from 15 April 1958 and The Times from 29 April 1958 refer to a ploughman's lunch consisting of bread, cheese and pickled onions.

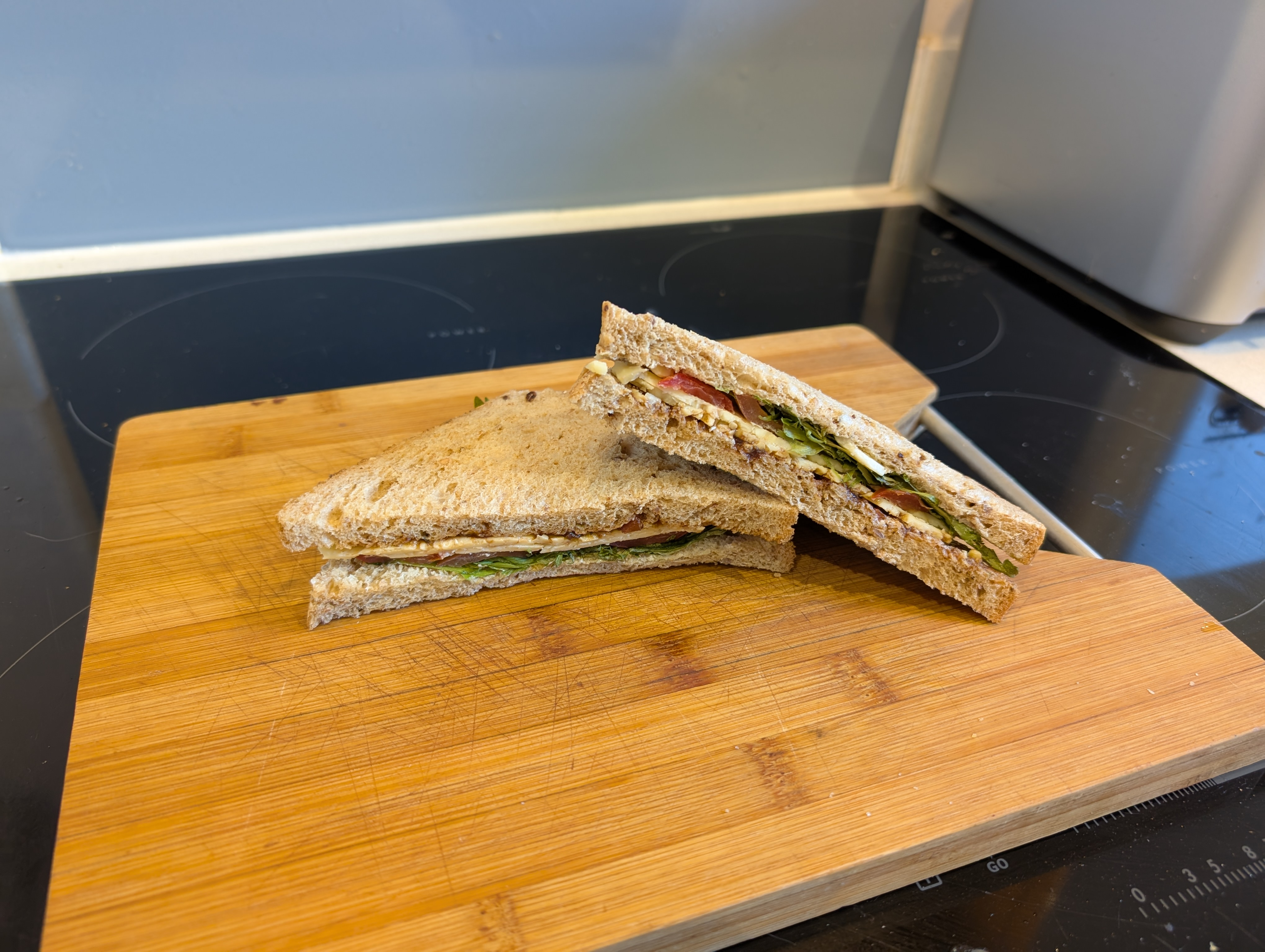
A pre-packaged cheese ploughman's sandwich, removed from its box

The meal rose rapidly in popularity during the 1970s. This has been argued to be at least partially based on a British cultural "revulsion from technology and modernity and a renewed love-affair with an idealised national past", although it appears the main reasons the ploughman's lunch was favoured by caterers were that it was simple and quick to prepare even for less skilled staff, required no cooking, and involved no meat, giving a potential for high profit margins.

The film The Ploughman's Lunch (1983), from a screenplay by Ian McEwan, has a subtext that is "the way countries and people re-write their own history to suit the needs of the present". The title alludes to the debatable claim that the supposedly "traditional" meal was the result of a marketing campaign of the 1960s devised to encourage people to eat meals in pubs.

In 2023, Bon Appétit described that year's girl dinner TikTok trend as being "basically a ploughman's lunch".

== See also ==
- English cheese
- Cheese and pickle sandwich, sometimes referred to by retailers as a "ploughman's sandwich"
