= OVS (company) =

Italian clothing company

- Type: Public (S.p.A.)
- Traded as: BIT: OVS; FTSE Italia Mid Cap
- Founded: 1972; 54 years ago
- Headquarters: Venice, Veneto, Italy
- Number of locations: 1822
- Area served: Worldwide
- Products: Retail
- Revenue: €1,017 billion (2020)
- Website: www.ovs.it

OVS (formerly Oviesse) is an Italian clothing company. It has stores in 35 countries in Europe, Latin America and Asia with a total of over 1300 locations. Revenues were €1.32 billion in 2015. It is the largest clothing retailer in Italy, accounting for about 5% of the national clothing retail market.

OVS was founded in 1972 as Organizzazione Vendite Speciali (special sales organization), a division of Coin, an Italian department store chain. The company remained a subsidiary of Coin Group until 2015, when an initial public offering (IPO) took place.

== Locations ==
Locations by country
Country	Stores
Albania	6
Andorra	2
Armenia	4
Austria	13
Azerbaijan	3
Bosnia and Herzegovina	4
China	19
Cyprus	7
Croatia	10
Costa Rica	4
Estonia	2
France	19
Georgia	9
Greece	9
India	1
Iran	4
Italy	911
Kosovo	5
Latvia	2
Lithuania	5
Mexico	1
Moldova	1
Mongolia	1
Montenegro	8
Morocco	3
North Macedonia	1
Peru	18
Philippines	4
Poland	2
Portugal	3
Qatar	1
Romania	1
Saudi Arabia	13
Serbia	9
Slovakia	2
Slovenia	19
Spain	117
Thailand	3
Tunisia	3
Ukraine	5
United Arab Emirates	8
UK	5
