= PrisXtra =

Swedish discount supermarket chain

PrisXtra was a Swedish low-price supermarket founded by Rudolf Lundin in 1991.

On 28 January 2008, it became a subsidiary of Axfood AB. By May 2013, PrisXtra had five stores in Stockholm.

In February 2013, Axfood announced plans to convert all of its PrisXtra stores into branches of the Hemköp or Willys supermarket chains, at a cost of 55 million kronor. The last PrisXtra store, at Storängsbotten, closed on 28 February 2014 and Axfood announced the simultaneous cessation of PrisXtra as a brand.
