= Tegut =

Swiss-owned supermarket chain

Tegut Gutberlet Stiftung & Co. KG
- Type: Stiftung
- Industry: Retail
- Founded: 1947
- Founder: Theo Gutberlet
- Headquarters: Fulda, Hesse, Germany
- Key people: Thomas Gutberlet (CEO)
- Products: Groceries
- Revenue: ▲€ 1.16 billion (2011)
- Owner: Federation of Migros Cooperatives
- Number of employees: 7,700 (2021)
- Website: www.tegut.com

Tegut (styled tegut...) is a German supermarket chain based in Fulda, Germany, which operates more than 300 supermarkets with approximately 7,600 employees across six of Germany's states, namely in Hesse, Thuringia, Bavaria, Rhineland-Palatinate, Lower Saxony and Baden-Württemberg. In early January 2013 it was bought by the Swiss retail company Migros.

In March 2026 the company's liquidation was announced. Of the approximately 300 stores, 178 have been taken over by Edeka and 38 by REWE. The grocery chain Tante Enso, which primarily operates in rural areas, also took over 36 smaller locations.

== History ==
The company was founded in 1947 by Theo Gutberlet under the name Thegu, derived from the first letters of his first and surname, which was later renamed in 1955 to Tegut. From 1961, the bigger supermarkets were called HaWeGe (an acronym for HandelsWarenGesellschaft) and from 1973, the smaller stores Okay! In 1972, Tegut established a subsidiary called kff Kurhessische Fleischwaren GmbH (KFF). In 1973, Wolfgang Gutberlet, the son of the company's founder, took over management. In 1989 the company was transferred to a foundation whose supervisory board appoints the managing directors. It was in 1998 that the company changed its name again, to its presently-stylised "tegut...". Since August 30th, 2009, Thomas Gutberlet, the grandson of the company founder, became the company's third generation CEO. The company also processes their own sausage and meat and founded the herzberger Bäckerei (Herzberger Bakery) in 1996 as a subsidiary. In 1997, Tegut was the first grocer in Germany to accept credit card payments. In 1998 the company was renamed tegut.... The markets also operate under this name. With the concept "Lädchen für alles" (small shop for everything), Tegut took up the concept of the corner shop in 2010 and set up smaller shops in the countryside and in urban districts to provide local supplies even in smaller communities.

On 11 October 2012, the Swiss retail company Genossenschaft Migros Zürich (Migros Zurich cooperative), which is one of the ten shareholder of the Migros Cooperative Association, announced the acquisition of the retail division of Tegut, consisting of six individual companies. The transaction became effective in January 2013 after the approval of the antitrust authorities and the administration of the Migros Cooperative Federation. The Migros Zurich Cooperative (GMZ) then took over the trading division of the former "tegut... Gutberlet Stiftung & Co. KG". Other businesses of the company, such as the Herzberger bakery, KFF as well as the agricultural businesses, became part of the new "W–E–G Stiftung & Co. KG". After Migros took over, the Gutberlet Foundation's shares in KFF were threatened due to the loss of its main customer Tegut and were sold at the end of 2016 to pet food manufacturer Deuerer from Bretten. In May 2017, the Herzberger bakery was reintegrated into the Tegut Group. At the end of April 2021, the company suffered a cyberattack, which caused stores to have empty shelves because of failures in the merchandise management software. The hackers published a database containing personal data of customer card holders on the dark web.

In November 2020, the first tegut...teo was opened in Fulda with a different store concept. The store offered a total of 950 products for everyday use in a 50 square metre self-service area, open 24 hours a day. At the beginning of March 2024, there were 39 of teo supermarkets. Due to a reassessment of the legal situation, these stores are no longer allowed to open on Sundays and public holidays in Hesse despite the absence of sales staff. In October 2022, Migros launched the concept in Switzerland with the opening of the first Migros teo, which is also open on weekends. In 2024, the Smart Retail Solutions GmbH was established in Germany to operate Teo Stores as a franchise. In addition, there are three so-called QUARTIER markets with a size of approx. 400 square meters and a wide range of fresh snacks and ready-prepared meals.

In April 2023 it was announced that Tegut would take over 19 of the organic supermarket chain Basic AG retroactively from the beginning of the year.

== Tegut Teos ==
Germany has long maintained a strict law prohibiting most retail shops from operating on Sundays. This tradition, dating back to 1956, aims to provide workers and shoppers with a day of rest. However, the growing popularity of automated mini-markets is challenging this longstanding practice.

These unmanned convenience stores, often called "Tegut Teos," have been rapidly expanding across Germany. These self-service outlets offer a limited range of products, including perishable items, and require minimal human intervention. Tegut has opened 40 Teos in the past four years, each operating with approximately 25 hours of human labor per week for restocking and cleaning.

The success of these automated stores is evident in their Sunday sales. Teos often generates 30% of their weekly revenue on this day, suggesting a strong demand for weekend shopping. As a result, the automated mini-market industry is lobbying state governments to relax the Sunday shopping restrictions, with some regions already showing signs of flexibility.

== Branches ==
The over 300 branches are located relatively close to the company headquarters in Fulda in eastern Hesse, and, since the new expansion policy from Migros started, also in the Stuttgart and Munich area. These are supplied from the central warehouse in Fulda and from Seebergen in Thuringia. Tegut is represented throughout most of Hesse, Thuringia and western Franconia. There are also a few branches in Mainz in Rhineland-Palatinate and in the Göttingen area in southern Lower Saxony. In 2014, the first market outside the previous distribution area was opened in Stuttgart. In some stores there were bakery counters in the checkout area belonging to the subsidiary Herzberger. In 2012, Tegut announced that it would give up these self-operated market cafés, occupy the space with regional bakeries and only sell Herzberger baked goods in the self-service area of the markets.

Tegut also operates 24 „tegut... Lädchen für alles" (from 120 sqm in rural and urban areas with around 4,200 products for local supply), which have a relatively small sales area and are designed for local supplies in rural areas.

== Products ==
=== Organic food ===
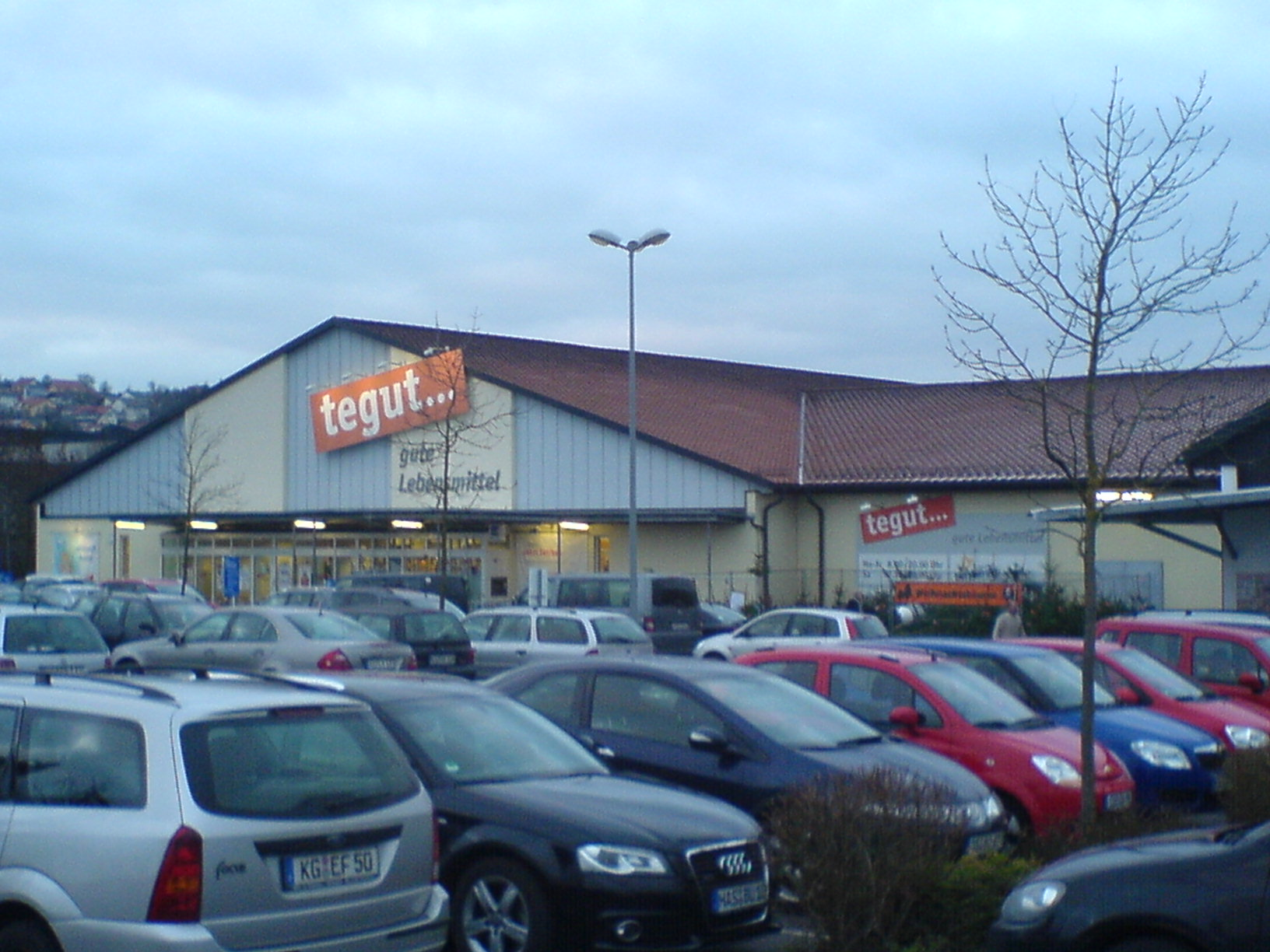
A Tegut store in Bad Kissingen, Bavaria

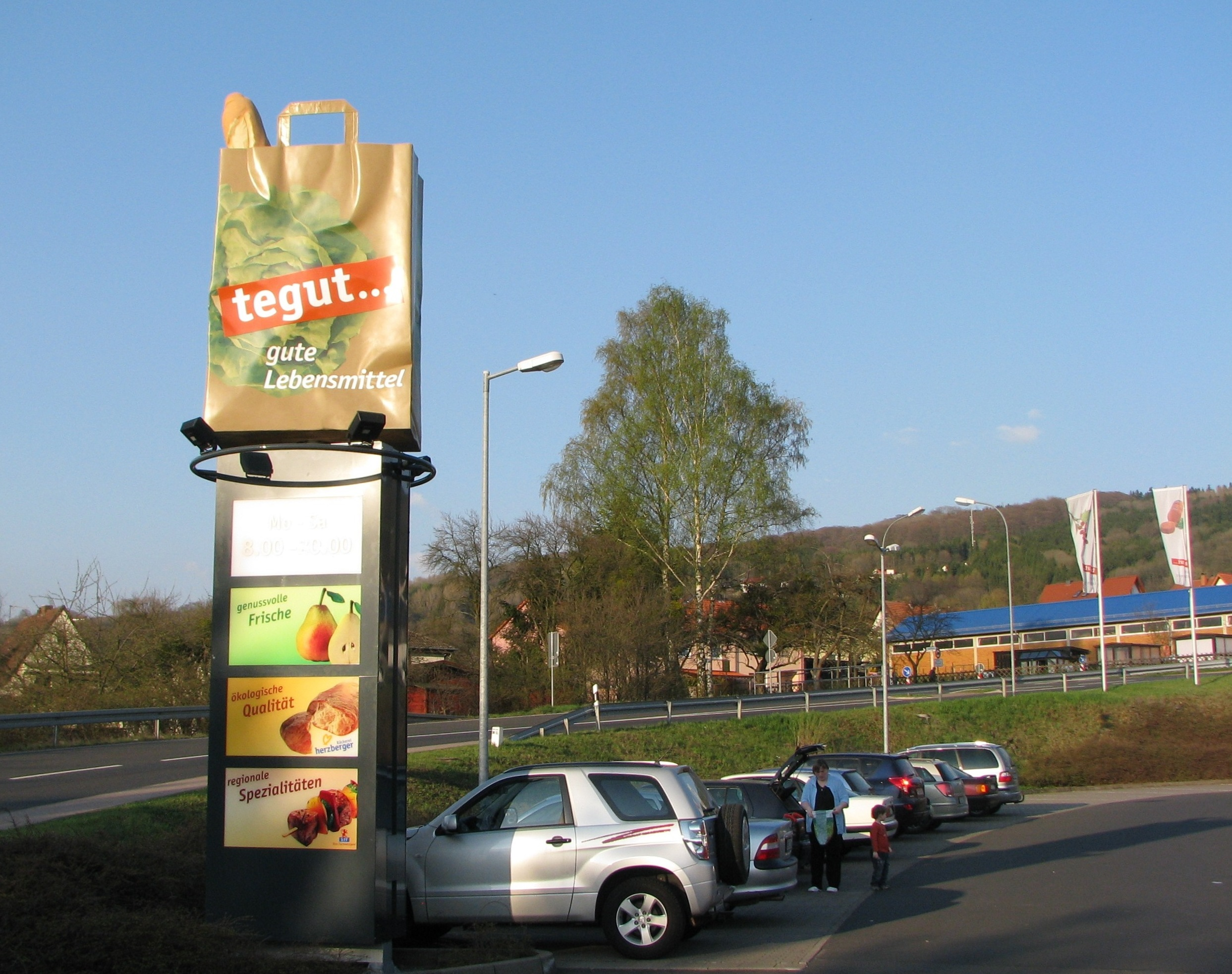
Post in Tann (Rhön)

Since 1982, Tegut has been involved in the cultivation and marketing of organic food. As of 2008, almost 20% of Tegut's revenue was made from their own-produced organic food, mostly grown in eastern Hesse. According to Tegut, organic products made up 28.4% of the revenue in 2022. Some of the 4,600 different organic products are sourced from Tegut's own Herzberg bakery and the Rhöner Biosphärenrind e. V., which also works closely with farmers in the East Hesse region. The anthroposophically managed company Alnatura is also an important partner for organic products.

Tegut has been selling products under its own brands since 1999. In July 2019, Tegut started offering 144 foods without packaging in a store in Fulda.

== Collaborations ==
=== Amazon ===
Tegut and Amazon started a collaboration in 2017, making it possible to order Tegut products through Amazon. They are extending the online delivery of typical supermarket groceries in the greater Fulda, Nuremberg, Kassel, Würzburg, Marburg, Giessen, Mainz and Wiesbaden areas via Amazon Prime. This service was initially only available to customers in and around Darmstadt and Frankfurt am Main. The online range comprises around 10,000 products in 2022. The delivery of beverages such as mineral water, beer, and milk also includes products in returnable containers such as glass bottles. However, unlike other suppliers, there is no return of deposit bottles, but according to Amazon this can be redeemed, for example, by using the "local drop-off points" or at tegut stores. In the description of the special delivery conditions, this "current" reference to Tegut stores is only stated in the FAQ.

=== Lieferando ===
In 2022 Tegut started a collaboration with Lieferando in Darmstadt with around 1,000 products available.

== Awards ==
- 2008: Entrepreneur of the Year for Wolfgang Gutberlet (Trade category)
- 2008: National German Sustainability Award: "Special Prize for the Most Sustainable Strategy"
- 2008: Order of Merit of the Federal Republic of Germany for Wolfgang Gutberlet for the high training rate, creation of new jobs and his commitment to high food quality by the Hessian Prime Minister Roland Koch
