= UPIM =

Italian department store chain

Upim
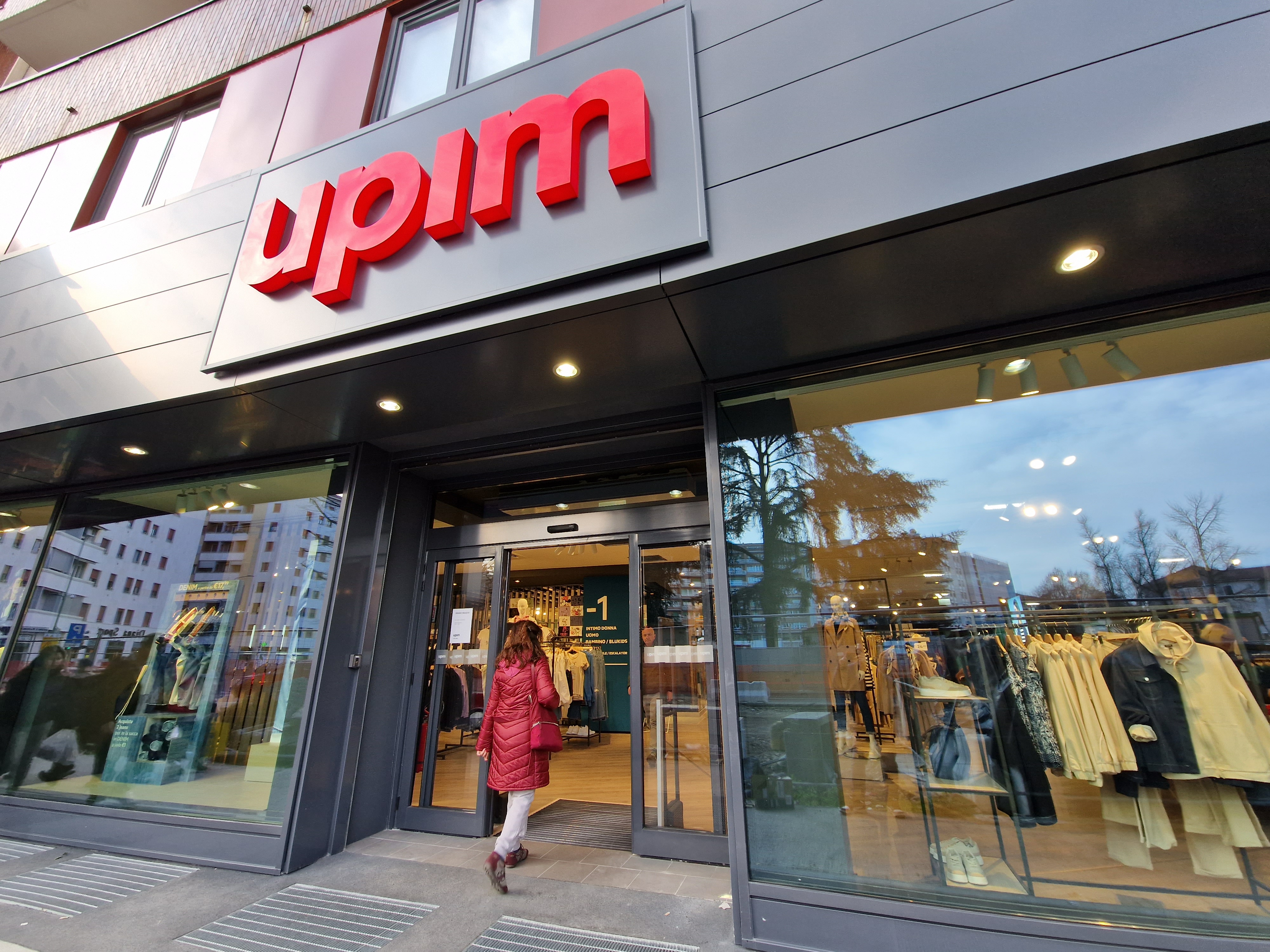
- Company type: Società a responsabilità limitata
- Industry: Retail
- Founded: Milan, Italy (1928)
- Headquarters: Mestre (Venice), Italy
- Number of locations: Europe
- Area served: Italy
- Products: Clothing, footwear, accessories, bedding, furniture, beauty products, and housewares
- Revenue: ▲
- Net income: ▼
- Website: www.upim.it

UPIM ("Unico Prezzo Italiano Milano"; "Single Italian Price Milan" in English) is an Italian chain of midmarket department stores specialising in clothes for men, women and children, items for the home, and cosmetics and perfumes. It currently operates 135 directly owned stores and more than 200 franchises, plus 15 stores under the Upim-BluKids brand. For a long time, it was part of La Rinascente Group and it was acquired by Coin in 2010.

The first store opened in Verona in 1928. The chain was purchased by the Agnelli family, along with the La Rinascente Group in the 1970s. In 2007, it became the primary sponsor of the Lega A basketball club Fortitudo Bologna. In January 2010, the business was acquired by Gruppo Coin, separating from La Rinascente and making Gruppo Coin, which already owned the Oviesse (OVS Industry) and Coin chains, the largest fashion retailer in the country.
