= Nomi (retail chain) =

Polish retail supermarket chain

Nomi S.A.
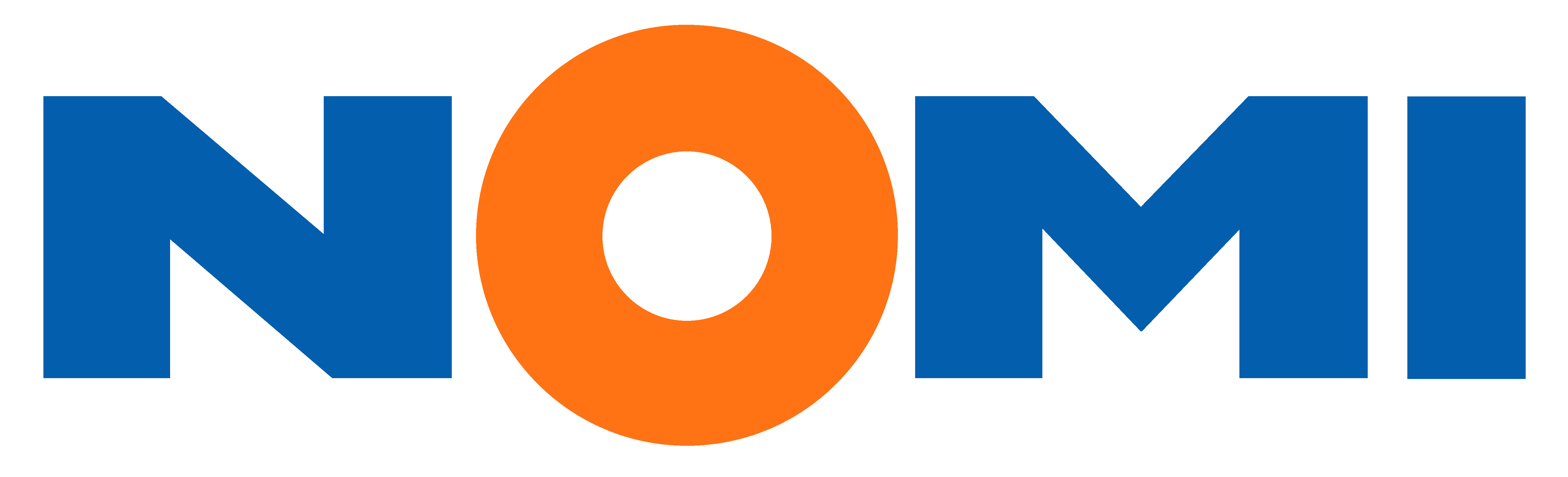

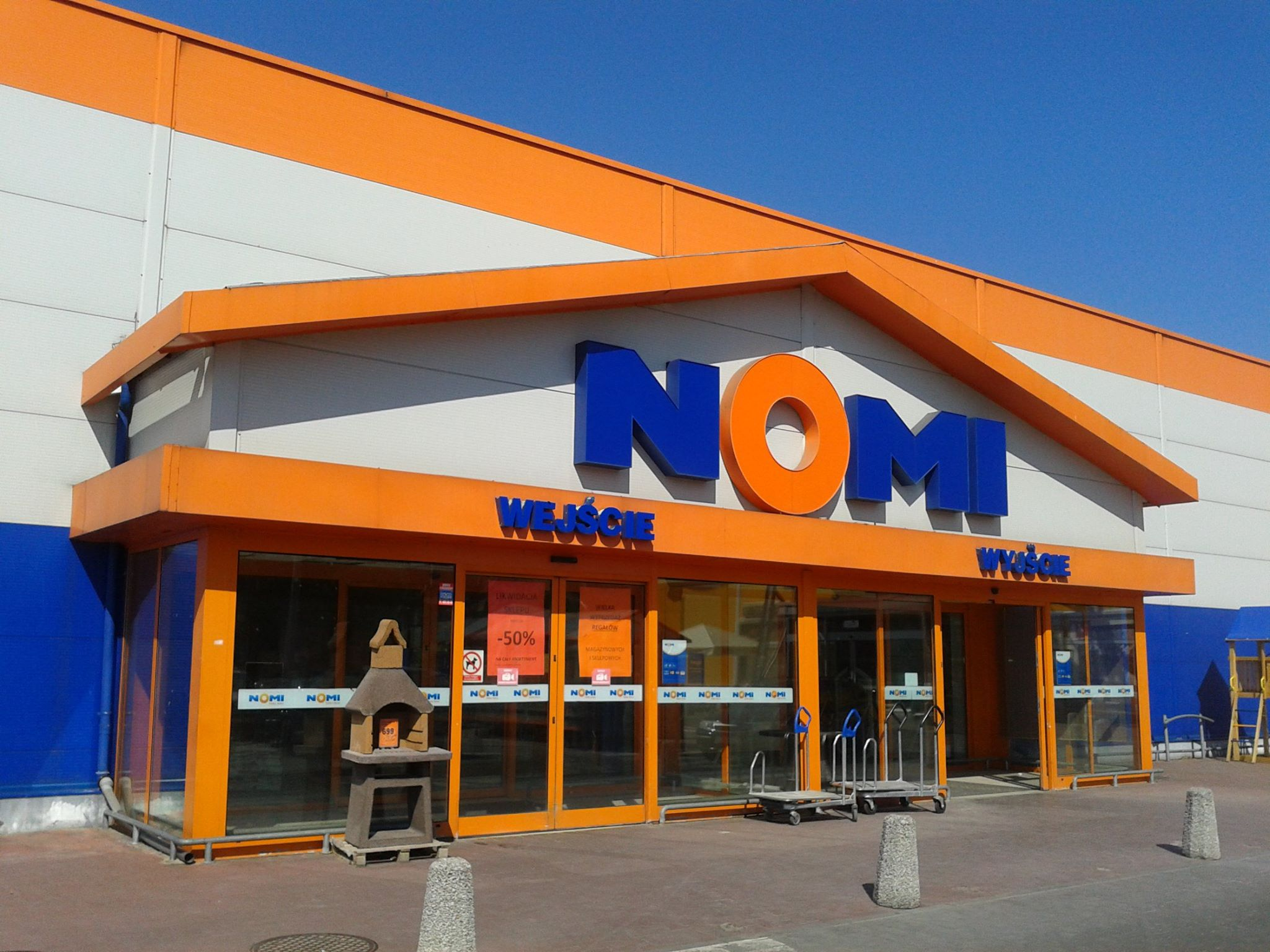
- Company type: Joint-stock company
- Industry: Retail
- Founded: 1993; 33 years ago
- Defunct: 2015
- Headquarters: 25-561 ul. Witosa 76, Kielce, Poland
- Area served: Poland

Nomi was a network of retail supermarkets in Poland, owned by Nomi SA with its registered office in Kielce and a sales office in Warsaw.

== Operations ==
Since 2007, Nomi SA has been part of the Polish capital group managed by i4ventures.

In 2002, Nomi operated 39 stores, making it the largest chain of its type in Poland. At that time, the company held an estimated 3–4% share of the DIY market, valued at approximately 15 billion PLN, with net profit of 1.4 million PLN.

On 28 May 2011 a fire broke out in the Leszno store that destroyed the entire building.

In 2012, annual revenues exceeded 468 million PLN. The company, however, reported a loss of more than 10 million PLN and, following a downturn in the construction materials market at the turn of 2012 and 2013, encountered financial difficulties. At the end of 2013, the company declared arrangement bankruptcy.

In 2015, the company entered the liquidation bankruptcy phase.

Between 2014 and 2016, 14 former Nomi locations were taken over by Bricomarché
