= Coin (department store) =

Italian department store chain

- Type: S.p.A.
- Industry: Retail
- Founded: Pianiga, Italy (1926)
- Founder: Vittorio Coin
- Headquarters: Venice, Italy
- Number of locations: Europe
- Area served: Italy; Albania
- Subsidiaries: OVS; UPIM
- Website: www.coin.it

Coin (Italian: [koˈin], Venetian: [koˈiŋ]) is an Italian upmarket department store chain dedicated to the worlds of apparel, home decorations, accessories and beauty. Its headquarters are located in Mestre.

== History ==
Coin was founded in 1916 in Pianiga, province of Venice, Veneto, Italy, by Vittorio Coìn, who obtained a street vendor license to sell fabrics and haberdashery items. In 1926, he opened a shop selling fabrics, yarns and linen in Mirano (Venice). Two years later a wholesale warehouse was opened in Dolo. After having strengthened the Mirano store (1931), a shop was opened (1933) and a warehouse (1937) in Mestre, followed by the store in Padua (1947).

In 1957 the Coin family opened a real multi-storey department store, the first in the chain, in Trieste, in the premises once occupied by Austrian department stores Öhler; in 1958 Coin still exceeded the regional boundaries by opening a large store in the centre of Bologna.

In 1962 it opened its flagship store in Milan at Piazza 5 Giornate.

The expansion continues touching Parma and Bergamo, up to the new large complex in Mestre in the city centre, developed on six floors with an area of nearly 20,000 m^{2}, plus a PAM supermarket in the basement. Between 1966 and 1974 warehouses were opened in Verona, Brescia, Vicenza, Varese, Pordenone, Vigevano, Mantua, Genoa, Livorno, Udine, Piacenza, Naples, Taranto and Ferrara.

Coin was the first retailer to develop a fidelity card program in Italy in 1986.

== Coin Group ==
The Coin Group owns OVS (Oviesse) (midmarket apparel department stores) and, since January 2010, UPIM, a midmarket apparel, home and beauty department stores chain previously part of La Rinascente Group.
