= Globus Holding =

German retail company

Globus
- Native name: Globus Holding
- Type: GmbH & Co. KG
- Industry: Retail
- Founded: 1828; 1966 (first Globus hypermarket)
- Founder: Franz Bruch
- Headquarters: Sankt Wendel, Sankt Wendel (district), Germany
- Number of locations: 76 hypermarkets in Germany and the Czech Republic; 91 DIY stores in Germany and Luxembourg
- Area served: Europe
- Revenue: 8,810,000,000 (2024)
- Operating income: 254,800,000 (2024)
- Net income: 136,000,000 (2021)
- Number of employees: 47,000 (June 2024)
- Website: http://www.globus.de, http://www.globus-baumarkt.de

Globus Holding GmbH & Co. KG, branded as Globus, is a German retail company based in Sankt Wendel, Saarland (Germany). The Globus Holding includes the Globus hypermarkets in Germany (known as Globus Markthallen) and the Czech Republic (known as Globus Hypermarkets), as well as the Globus DIY stores (known as Globus Baumarkt).

== History ==
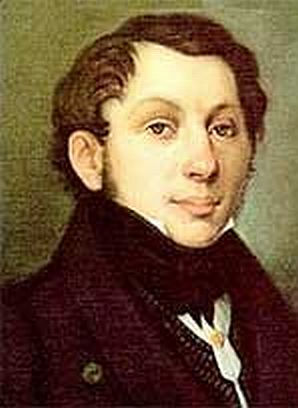
Franz Bruch, the founder

In 1828, Franz Bruch (1801–1865) opened a grocery store under his own name in Sankt Wendel, a town in northeastern Saarland, Germany. The company management passed to his son Joseph Adam Bruch (1837–1905) in 1865. Joseph Karl Bruch (1873–1949), the founder's grandson, took over from his father in 1905. Since then, the company has developed from being a retailer only and expanded into wholesale. On 1 February 1949, Joseph died and his two sons, Franz-Josef and Dr Walter Bruch (1913–1999), took over the company. In the 1950s, the shopping behaviour of consumers changed, and self-service made its way into the retail trade. Walter and Franz Josef Bruch began to restructure the company, developing it into a cash and carry market. In 1953 the company opened its first self-service grocery at its headquarters under the name "A. Backhaus KG".

The company grew further with the opening of a consumer market in Einöd in 1966. That store is regarded as the forerunner of the later Globus hypermarkets. The following years were characterized by further openings and expansion, making Globus one of the largest food retailers in Germany today.

After German reunification, Globus opened its first store in eastern Germany. With the opening of the first hypermarket in the Czech Republic in 1996, Globus took the first step towards expansion outside Germany. Followed by the opening of the first hypermarket in Russia in 2006.

In 2005, Globus opened its first master bakeries in some hypermarkets. In addition, there are specialist butchers and often restaurants. Fresh counters for sushi, cheese and fish complete the offer. Some locations also have petrol stations and car washes.

On 1 July 2020, Thomas Bruch handed over the management of Globus Holding to his son Matthias Bruch.

In August 2020, Globus hypermarkets joined the RTG (Retail Trade Group) retail cooperation, currently one of the largest retail cooperations in Germany. At the end of 2020, the Federal Cartel Office Globus approved the takeover of up to 24 Real stores. In 2021, the first three of 16 Real markets in Braunschweig, Krefeld and Essen became part of Globus. Ten further former Real locations were converted and integrated into the company in 2022, followed by the last three location takeovers in 2023: Wesel, Siegen and Hamburg-Lurup.

As part of a revision of the concept and appearance of the company's stores, they were renamed Markthallen in January 2022. At the same time, Globus SB-Warenhaus Holding changed its name to Globus Markthallen Holding.

== DIY stores ==
In 1982, Erich Huwer initiated the first Globus DIY store in Saarbrücken, Germany and subsequently built up the company's independent DIY division. Independent DIY stores followed in Zweibrücken in 1986 and Regensburg in 1988. In 1990, expansion into eastern Germany began with the opening of a DIY store in Ilmenau.

In 1987, the activities were merged into Globus Baumarkt Holding GmbH & Co. KG, and since 2003 the company has been known as Globus Fachmärkte GmbH & Co. KG. Its business is centred on DIY, home improvement and garden supplies.

In July 2007, Globus Baumarkt acquired 33 Hela large-scale DIY stores from the Distributa Group, 31 of them in Germany and two in Luxembourg. In December 2013, Globus Baumarkt announced the takeover of eleven locations of the insolvent DIY chain Max Bahr.

In January 2020, Timo Huwer, who had already been part of the management of Globus Fachmärkte since 2012, took over the position of his father Erich Huwer as spokesman of the management board. In early 2026, Huwer stepped down from this post for health reasons; he died on 11 April 2026 at the age of 53 following a serious illness. From January 2026, the company was initially led once again by Erich Huwer, who shared the role with Pia Frey and Gerald Neumayr. On 1 October 2026, Paulo Kadilar took over as the new spokesman of the management board. The management team is completed by Joachim Hoffmann and, as before, Pia Frey.

== Globus around the world ==
Globus operates 60 hypermarkets in Germany and 16 hypermarkets in the Czech Republic (fiscal year 2026/27). In the Czech Republic, the company also operates four locations of a small-scale format called Globus Fresh in Pardubice, Prague-Repy, Prague-Stodůlky and Brno.

There are 91 Globus Baumarkt (DIY) stores, 89 of them in Germany and two in Luxembourg, with around 9,000 employees. The administration is located in Völklingen, Saarland (Germany).

Country	First store	Number of stores
Czech Republic	1996	16
Germany	1966	60 (+ 89 DIY)
Russia	2006	20
Luxembourg	2007	2 DIY

The Russian hypermarkets (OOO Hyperglobus / Globus Russia) were spun off into an independent company at the turn of the year 2024/2025 and have been operating independently since January 2025.

== Corporate Structure ==
Globus Holding GmbH & Co. KG headquartered in Sankt Wendel, Germany, includes three divisions: Hypermarkets, DIY stores, and Real Estate. The Hypermarkets division comprises the business units in Germany and the Czech Republic.

The Globus Group employs around 34,000 people, of whom around 28,000 work in Germany. Globus Group closed the 2024/2025 financial year with sales of €8.81 billion.

== Controversy ==
Despite Russia's invasion of Ukraine in 2022, Globus Group continued operations in Russia, which has drawn criticism. While condemning the war and expressing concerns over possibility of losing company's Russian assets through forced nationalization, the managing director Matthias Bruch wants to continue the business in Russia.

On 1 January 2025, Globus Holding completely divested its direct stake in the Russian hypermarkets. The Russian business was spun off into an independent company in which the Globus shareholders continue to hold an unchanged stake.

== Gallery ==
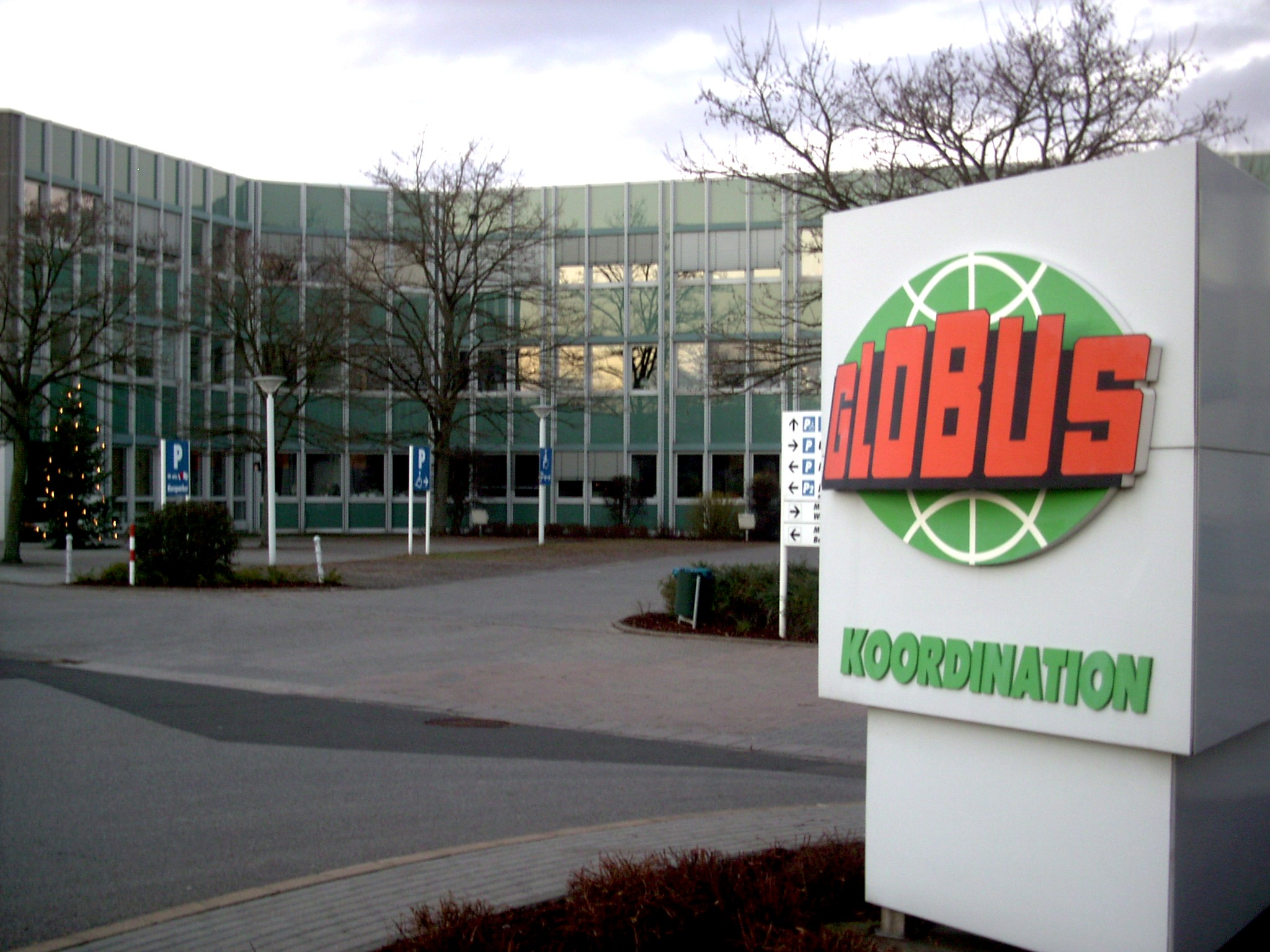
Globus headquarters in Sankt Wendel, Germany

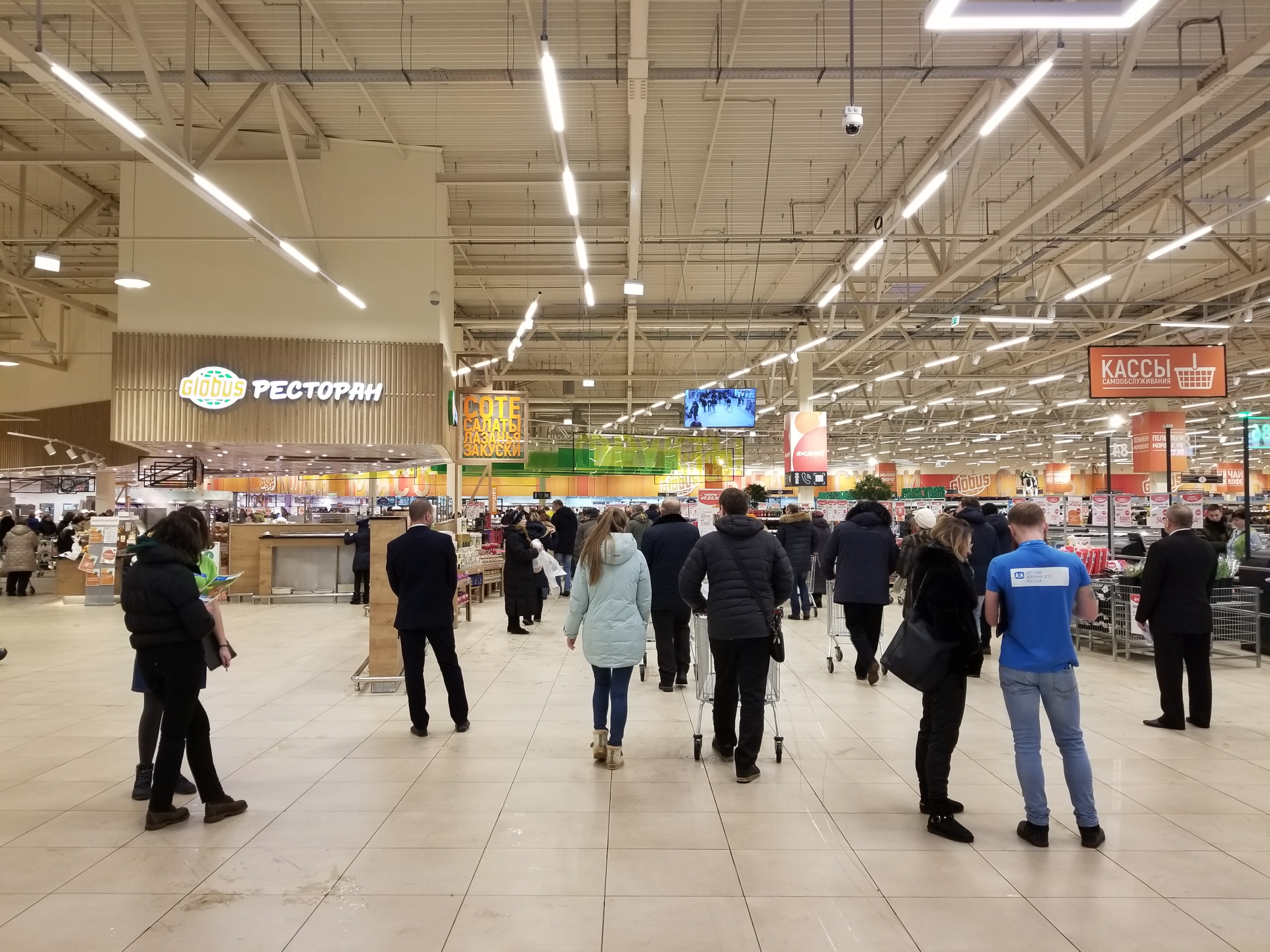
Globus hypermarket in Kotelniki, Russia
