= REWE =

German supermarket chain

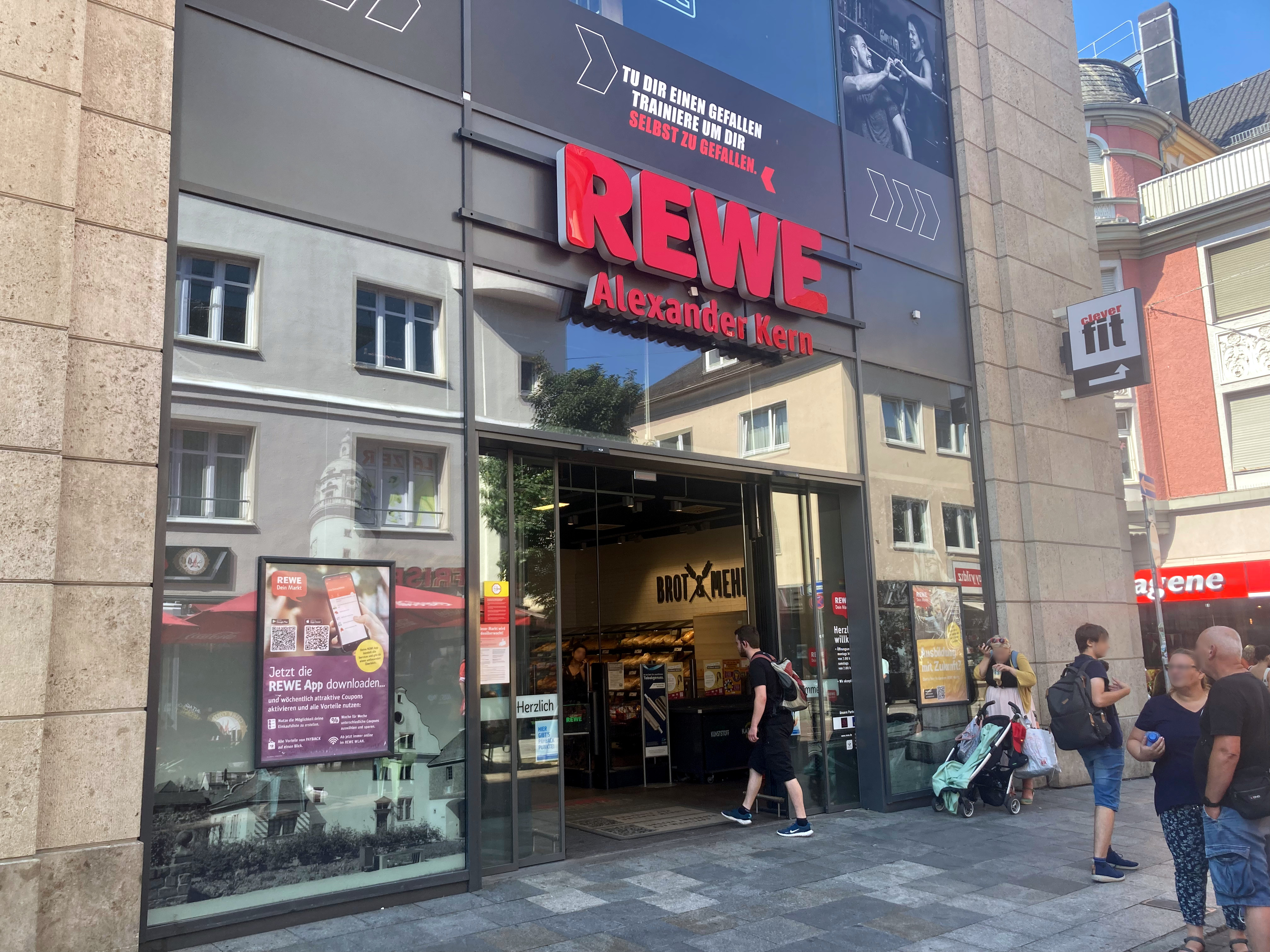
- A REWE supermarket in Frankfurt
- Number of employees: 170,000 (2023)

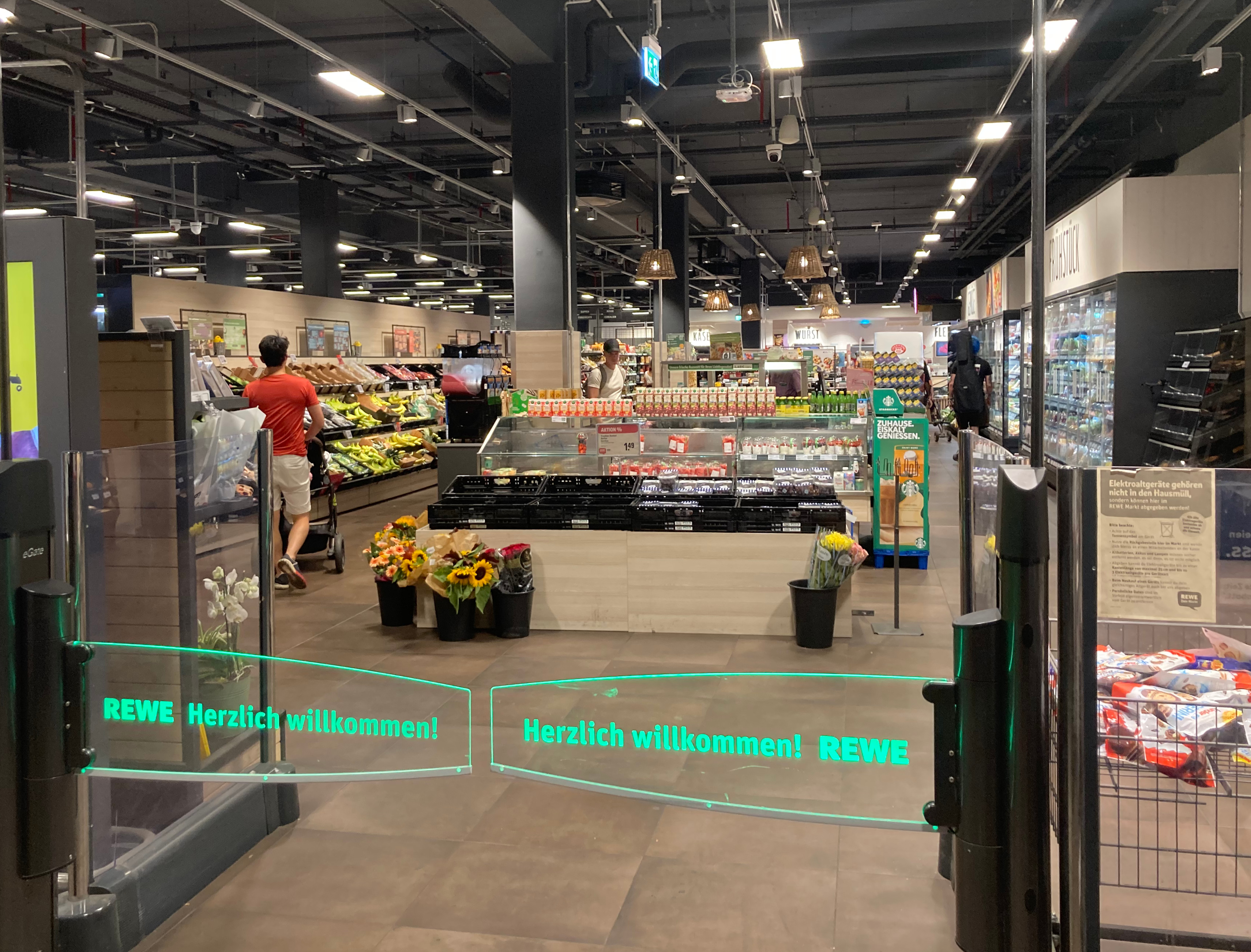
Inside of a REWE

Rewe (stylized as REWE; German pronunciation: [ˈʁeːvə]) is a supermarket chain in Germany and the main brand of REWE Group headquartered in Cologne. The name originated from an abbreviation of the original name "Revisionsverband der Westkauf-Genossenschaften" (Audit union for Westkauf-Cooperatives). With about 3,300 stores, Rewe is the second largest food retailer in Germany behind EDEKA.

In 2011, the company started a delivery service with a test run in Frankfurt am Main, which was gradually expanded to locations throughout Germany. With this approach, Rewe was a pioneer in online grocery delivery within Germany. As of 2015, they have publicised plans for investing more heavily in their online presence.

Their own store brand products are branded "ja!" (German for "yes", discounter price), "REWE Beste Wahl" (German for "best choice, "normal" price), "REWE Feine Welt" (German for "fine world", high price, special items), "REWE Bio" (Organic), "REWE Bio + vegan" (Organic and vegan), "REWE frei von" (German for "free of", allergen-free), "REWE Regional" and "REWE to go".

The Bundesliga club 1. FC Köln is sponsored by Rewe on their jerseys.
