= List of retail chains in Slovenia =

This is a list of retail chains in Slovenia.

== Grocery stores ==
Store	Type	Market entry in Slovenia	Parent company	Number of stores (2026)	Revenue in million EUR	Market share %	Website
E.Leclerc	hypermarket	2000		2	85.5 (2025)	1.7 (2025)	e-leclerc.si
EuroSpin	discount	2004		60	325.9 (2025)	6.6 (2025)	eurospin.si
Hofer	discount	2005	Aldi Süd	93	712.1 (2025)	14.3 (2025)	hofer.si
Jager	convenience store, supermarket, hypermarket	1989		42	259.5 (2025)	5.2 (2025)	trgovinejager.com
Lidl	discount	2007	Schwarz Gruppe	69	674 (2025)	13.6 (2025)	lidl.si
Mercator	convenience store, supermarket, hypermarket	1949	Fortenova Group	629	1,180 (2025)	23.8 (2025)	mercator.si
Spar	convenience store, supermarket, hypermarket	1991	Spar Austria Group	161	1,261 (2025)	25.4 (2025)	spar.si
Tuš	convenience store, supermarket, hypermarket	1990	Engrotuš	260	460.6 (2025)	9.3 (2025)	tus.si

== Drugstores ==
Store	Market entry in Slovenia	Parent company	Number of stores	Website
dm	1992	dm-drogerie markt GmbH & Co. KG	77	dm-drogeriemarkt.si
L'Occitane	?	L'Occitane en Provence	20	loccitane.si
Lush	?	Lush Ltd.	3	lush.si
Melvita	2009	Melvita	14	melvita.si
Müller	1994	Müller Holding Ltd. & Co. KG	16	mueller.si
The Body Shop	2017	The Body Shop International Limited	2	https://thebodyshop.si/
Yves Rocher	?	Groupe Yves Rocher	2	http://yves-rocher.si/

Former:

- Watsons

== Home renovation / DIY / Furniture ==
Store	Market entry in Slovenia	Parent company	Number of stores	Website
Bauhaus	?	Bauhaus	3	bauhaus.si
Harvey Norman	2002	Harvey Norman Holdings Limited	5	harveynorman.si
IKEA	2021	IKEA	1	ikea.com
Jysk	2008	Jysk	23	jysk.si
Obi	1998	Obi Group Holding SE & Co. KGaA	9	obi.si
Opremisidom	2010	Opremisidom	1	opremisidom.com
Hiška24.si	2019	e-Store Monika OÜ	1	hiska24.si

Former:

- bauMax
- M Pohištvo

== Kids / toy stores ==
LEGO store	2016	Bravogroup Holding	1

== Clothing stores ==
Store	Market entry in Slovenia	Parent company	Number of stores	Website
Bershka	late 2000s	Industria de Diseño Textil, S.A.	3	bershka.si
C&A	2007	Cofra Group	15	c-and-a.si
Calzedonia	?	Calzedonia S.p.A.	5	calzedonia.si
Desigual	?	Desigual	4	magistrat.si/SL/trgovine/desigual
Dorothy Perkins	?	Arcadia Group	2	magistrat.si/SL/trgovine/dorothy-perkins
Etam lingerie	?	Etam Développement	3	magistrat.si/SL/trgovine/etam
GAP	2014	GAP Inc.	GAP x2 GAP Kids x2 babyGAP x1	international.gapinc.com/gap/si/sl/home
H&M	2004	H & M Hennes & Mauritz AB	12	hm.si
Intimissimi	?	Calzedonia S.p.A.	5	world.intimissimi.com/home.jsp
Kik	2007	KiK Textilien und Non-Food GmbH	around 50	kik.si
Levi's	?	Levi Strauss & Co.	1	europa92.hr
Lisca	(est.) 1965	Lisca d.d.	Lisca x24 Cheek by Lisca x1	lisca.si
Marella	2010	Max Mara Fashion Group	2	magistrat.si/SL/trgovine/marella
NewYorker	2000	NewYorker Group Services International GmbH & Co.KG	16	newyorker.de/sl/moda/
NKD	2000	NKD Deutschland GmbH	54	nkd.si
Okaïdi	?	ID group	9	okaidi.si
Orsay	?	Association familiale Mulliez	8	orsay.si
OVS	2013	OVS S.p.A.	around 16	ovsslovenija.si
Peek & Cloppenburg	2007	Peek & Cloppenburg KG Wien	2	peek-cloppenburg.si
Pepe Jeans	2007	Pepe Jeans	2	pepejeans.si
Pimkie	?	Association familiale Mulliez	2	sportina.si/sl/Znamke/Pimkie/
Primark	2019	Associated British Foods plc	1	https://www.primark.com/sl
Pull&Bear	2007	Industria de Diseño Textil, S.A.	2	pullandbear.si
S.Oliver	?	s.Oliver Bernd Freier GmbH & Co. KG	S.Oliver x13 S.Oliver Junior x4 S.Oliver Black Label x4	soliver.si
Superdry	2016	SuperGroup plc	1	sportina.si/sl/Znamke/Superdry/
Stradivarius	?	Industria de Diseño Textil, S.A.	4	stradivarius.com/si
Takko	2009	Takko Holding GmbH	19	takko.si
Tally Weijl	2000's	Tally Weijl	10	sportina.si/sl/Znamke/Tally-Weijl
Tom Tailor	1999	Tom Tailor Holding SE	Tom Tailor x19 TT Denim x3 TT Outlet x3 TT Kids x1	tom-tailor.store
Tommy Hilfiger	?	Apax Partners LLP	1	si.tommy.com
Triumph	1990's	Triumph International	3	triumph.si
Zara	2003	Industria de Diseño Textil, S.A.	4	zara.si

== Footwear stores ==
Store	Market entry in Slovenia	Parent company	Number of stores	Website
Bata	?	Bata family	2	sportina.si/sl/Znamke/Bata
Camper	?	Camper	1	transporter-footwear.com
Deichmann	2006	Deichmann SE	26	deichmann.si
ecco	?	ECCO Sko A/S	ecco x3 ecco outlet x1	si.ecco.com
Geox Respira	?	FTSE Italia Mid Cap	8	proshop.si
Humanic	2000	Leder und Schuh	6	humanic.si
Timberland	?	VF Corporation	2	timberland.hr

== Sportswear & other sport equipment ==
Store	Market entry in Slovenia	Parent company	Number of stores	Website
Adidas	?	Adidas AG	3	prva-liga.si
Champion	?	HanesBrands Inc.	9	champion.si
Dainese	?	Dainese	1	proshop.si
Decathlon	2016	Decathlon	3	decathlon.si
Hervis	1997	Spar Österreichische Warenhandels-AG	17	hervis.si
Intersport	?	Intersport GmbH	40	intersport.si
SportsDirect.com	2013	Sports Direct International plc	15	sportsdirect.si

== Sport equipment stores ==
- Decathlon

== Bags & other fashion accessories ==
Store	Market entry in Slovenia	Parent company	Number of stores	Website
Parfois	?	Parfois	3	sportina.si/sl/Znamke/Parfois/
Samsonite	?	Samsonite International S.A.	5	toko.si

== Jewellery, goldsmith & watch stores ==
Store	Market entry in Slovenia	Parent company	Number of stores	Website
Swarovski	?	Swarovski Group	4	swarovski.si
Zlatarna Celje	(est.) 1844	Al Inžiniring	38	zlatarnacelje.si

== Electronics stores ==
- Harvey Norman

== Bookstores ==
- Müller

== Gift shops ==
- Kik
- NKD
