= Ivica Todorić =

Croatian businessman and former owner of Agrokor

- Born: 2 January 1951 (age 75); Kloštar Ivanić, PR Croatia, FPR Yugoslavia
- Education: University in Zagreb
- Occupations: Businessman, owner of Agrokor
- Spouse: Vesna Bašić
- Children: 3

Ivica Todorić (pronounced [îʋit͜sa tôdorit͜ɕ]; born 2 January 1951) is a Croatian businessman. Until June 2017, he was the owner and chairman of the board of Agrokor, the largest privately owned company in Croatia. The operations of Agrokor are focused on two core businesses: manufacturing of food and drinks, and retail.

== Biography ==
Todorić was born in 1951. His mother, Ivana, was a teacher from Kloštar Ivanić. His father, Ante Todorić, was a prominent figure in the agricultural area of the Socialist Republic of Croatia and was the chief engineer and director of Božjakovina farm in Dugo Selo, where Todorić grew up. He went to school in Zagreb, where he also graduated from the Faculty of Economics. He went to school with the former prime minister Nikica Valentić.

In 1976, Todorić launched a private company producing and trading flowers. In a few years he expanded the business throughout the former Yugoslavia. Business began to expand into new opportunities — import and export of cereals, oil crops, fruits and vegetables — and, in 1989, Agrokor was registered as a joint stock company, with Todorić as its 100% stockholder. By acquiring agricultural processing and food production companies, as well as retail stores, Agrokor grew to become a leading regional conglomerate. He used the opportunity of the war to acquire new assets.

Agrokor's operations accelerated during the Franjo Tuđman presidency. In 1993, Todorić obtained a very advantageous loan from the Zagrebačka banka to acquire the First Croatian Oil Factory and DIP Turopolje. In 1994, Agrokor acquired the wholesale retailer Unikonzum (later renamed Konzum) and the frozen goods company Ledo. Today, the group includes leading producers of food and drinks and the largest Croatian retail chain. In 2013, Agrokor bought Mercator, Slovenia's biggest retailer and largest employer, for 240 million euros. In 2014, Agrokor hired Rothschild & Co to prepare an IPO.

Todorić was one of the founders and the first president of the Croatian Employers' Association, founded in 1993.

== Collapse of Agrokor ==
Todorić was the company's CEO until April 2017. When Agrokor's financial difficulties became untenable, in March 2017, the government of Croatia hastily drafted and passed the Law on Extraordinary Administration Procedure in Enterprises of Systematic Importance for the Republic of Croatia and, by Todorić's activation of the Law in early April 2017, the government forestalled the bankruptcy procedure and effectively took control of the company. Special administrator Ante Ramljak was appointed by the commercial court on 10 April 2017.

In 2019, Croatian authorities indicted Todorić on the count of sending 1.25 million euro of the company's money to a Swiss company for fictitious services. Todoric has been under investigation since November 2017 on suspicion of making an illegal gain of more than a billion kuna (120 million euro). That investigation also covers his sons Ivan and Ante Todorić and 12 Agrokor managers and auditors.

On 16 November 2021, the Zagreb County Prosecutor's Office withdrew the indictment in the Agrokor case, which accused the former conglomerate's owner Todorić and 14 others of defrauding it of HRK 1.2 billion.

== Political career ==
In 2023, Todorić announced that he is entering politics and that he will form his own political party and run for Prime Minister.

== Personal life ==
Todorić is married to Vesna Bašić-Todorić. They have three children – a daughter, Iva, and two sons, Ante and Ivan. All three children hold senior positions within Agrokor. The family's residence is the Kulmer Castle in Zagreb.
