= The Lido =

The Lido may refer to:

- Le Lido, a musical theatre venue located on the Champs-Élysées in Paris, France
- The Lido, Bristol, a historic swimming pool in Clifton, Bristol, England
- Lido Golf Club, a former golf course in Nassau County, New York, U.S.
- Lido Theatre (disambiguation), several venues
- Venice Lido, a barrier island in the Venetian Lagoon of Venice, Italy

== See also ==
- Adventures on the Lido, a 1933 Austrian musical comedy film
- Lido (disambiguation)
