= Ledo =

Ledo may refer to:

- Ledo, Assam, India, a town
- Ledo, Jharkhand, India, a village and former Zamindari Gadi in pergana Kharagdiha
- Ledo Airfield, a World War II United States Army Air Forces airfield in India
- Ledo language, an austronesian language spoken in Sulawesi, Indonesia
- Ledo Road, a World War II road connecting Ledo, India, to Kunming, China
- Ledo Pizza, an American restaurant chain
- Ledo (company), a Croatian ice cream producer
- Ledo (name), a list of people with the surname or given name

== See also ==
- Leto (disambiguation)
- Lido (disambiguation)
