= Zvijezda (company) =

Croatian edible oil manufacturing company

Zvijezda plus d.o.o.
- Official logo since 2006
- Type: Private limited company Historical: Joint-stock company (1916–1946); Labour-managed firm (1946–1993)
- Industry: Consumer goods
- Founded: September 15, 1916; 109 years ago in Zagreb, Austria-Hungary (present-day Croatia)
- Founders: Samuel David Alexander, Vjekoslav Heinzel, Stanko Švergulja, Alfred Pick (first shareholders)
- Headquarters: Zagreb, Croatia
- Area served: Croatia, Bosnia and Herzegovina, Slovenia
- Products: Edible oil, mayonnaise, margarine, ketchup
- Revenue: ▼€150.38 million (2025)
- Net income: ▲€9.78 million (2025)
- Number of employees: 440+ (2025)
- Parent: Žito d.d. Osijek
- Website: www.zvijezda.hr

Zvijezda (officially: Zvijezda plus d.o.o.; transl. Star) is a Croatian edible oil manufacturing and processing company headquartered in Zagreb. Since 2026, it has been owned by Žito d.d. Osijek.

== History ==
The company was established on 15 September 1916 in the capital city of Zagreb as Prva hrvatska tvornica ulja d. d. ("The First Croatian Oil Factory"), prompted by the decision of the Royal Croatian-Slavonian-Dalmatian Government of the Land to prohibit import of oilseeds, as well as by the lack of animal fats on the market due to wartime circumstances. Its purpose according to the foundation act was manufacturing, processing and selling edible oil. True to its name, it became the first oil factory in the region of Croatia-Slavonia and Dalmatia, crown lands of the Austro-Hungarian Empire. Among its first shareholders were Samuel David Alexander, a prominent industrialist, and Vjekoslav Heinzel, an architect and then-city representative of Zagreb. It had a venture capital of 500,000 Austro-Hungarian krones.

Prva hrvatska tvornica ulja commenced its business in October 1917, producing pumpkin seed oil and sunflower oil, reaching 800 thousand litres of manufactured oil by the end of the same year. Modernising its oilseed extraction methods and expanding its production halls in the years following its establishment, the company started producing rapeseed oil (for lighting) and linseed oil. Refined edible oil production began in 1924, and it was soon accounting for 55% of all oil consumption in the country of Yugoslavia. The Great Depression affected oil consumption in the country negatively in favour of animal fats, although adoption and popularisation of oil resumed by 1934. In the 1930s, around 35 tonnes of oil was produced per one day. Sergije Glumac, a prominent Croatian graphic designer in the interwar Yugoslavia who had been in charge of coordinating design, advertising, marketing and propaganda activities of companies under majority ownership of the Alexander family, designed the company's visual identity and trademark symbol in the early 1930s — a red star — according to which the oil product itself became known as "Crvena zvijezda" and after World War II in Yugoslavia simply as "Zvijezda".

In 1941, Yugoslavia came under occupation of Axis powers and Prva hrvatska tvornica ulja was now located in the capital of the Nazi puppet state Independent State of Croatia. Most members of the Alexander family, who were Jewish, either fled the country or perished in the Holocaust, and all of their assets including that of Prva hrvatska tvornica ulja were seized and transferred to another joint-stock company, Povlašteno hrvatsko industrijsko trgovačko d. d. (POHIT). Due to association with the anti-fascist resistance movement of Yugoslav Partisans, the red star on the logo and branding of the company and its products was censored and replaced with a black circle. The company produced at a reduced capacity during World War II due to a lack of raw materials. In 1943, it came under control of the German Wehrmacht and all of its oil was shipped either to Germany or to the Eastern Front.

After World War II and establishment of the Socialist Federal Republic of Yugoslavia, Prva hrvatska tvornica ulja was nationalised and its name was changed first to Tvornica ulja – Crvena zvijezda ("Oil Factory – Red Star") and then Tvornica ulja Zagreb ("Oil Factory Zagreb"; TUZ) according to the naming scheme established for most companies in the newly established system. One of the first tasks was modernisation of transport of raw materials, now powered with conveyor belts rather than by horses. The company's workers elected their first workers' council in 1950, following the introduction of the socialist self-management system in Yugoslavia. In 1952, a production control research laboratory was founded in TUZ; by 1956 this laboratory developed a new product on the Yugoslav market — margarine. In 1957, TUZ was expanded with a hydraulic station built on a newly appropriated 56 hectares large area in Žitnjak. In 1959, TUZ developed and brought another first product on the country's market — mayonnaise — and remained the sole producer of mayonnaise in Yugoslavia throughout the 1960s. In the early 1970s, TUZ accounted for over one-third of edible vegetable fats consumption in Yugoslavia, rivaling Dijamant from SR Serbia.

As Croatia seceded from Yugoslavia in the early 1990s, Tvornica ulja Zagreb underwent privatisation and was acquired by Agrokor in 1993, and had been renamed Zvijezda d. d. in 1995. Since independence of Croatia and as of 2017, Zvijezda remains the sole producer of mayonnaise in the country. With Agrokor engulfed in debt and scandals, Zvijezda was transferred to a newly established Fortenova Group in 2019 and renamed Zvijezda plus d. d. In 2026, as part of its divestment programme, Fortenova Group sold Zvijezda plus and its Slovenian affiliate to the Osijek-based food producer Žito d.d. for €94.06 million.

== Locations ==
As the company needed to expand, it had been first located at the Junije Palmotić Street, then fully moved to Knez Branimir Street in 1920. A second station was built in Žitnjak in 1957. The old station at Knez Branimir Street was simultaneously maintained and continuously upgraded alongside the new site at Žitnjak, and had been working in full force until the 1980s. The old building was eventually fully abandoned by 1995, throughout the Croatian War of Independence, and the modern Zvijezda continues to operate in Žitnjak ever since.

The old building of Zvijezda, used since 1920 until the 1990s, came under spotlight in late 2017 and early 2018, when Zagreb City mayor Milan Bandić in collaboration with the Auschwitz and Bergen-Belsen survivor and acclaimed film producer Branko Lustig announced plans to reconstruct and convert the building into a Museum of Holocaust, in memory of the Alexander family. A performance of Brundibár was organised in front of the building on the International Holocaust Remembrance Day of 2018. The building has been recognised as a cultural monument in Croatia.

== Market share ==
As of 2022, Zvijezda is the Croatian nationwide leader in the market share of all its flagship products, including oil (at 57%), margarine (at 69%), mayonnaise (at 65%), and ketchup (at 47%).

== Reception and awards ==
Zvijezda products are consistently rated as among top brands in Croatia according to an annual BRANDscore ranking list by Ipsos; Zvijezda oil and Zvijezda mayonnaise have ranked first and second seven years in a row, with Zvijezda oil leading the list between 2018 and 2022, then Zvijeda mayonnaise in 2023 and 2024.

Zvijezda has received the annual "Zlatna kuna" ("Golden Kuna") plaque award for the year 2022 in the category of large companies from the Croatian Chamber of Economy.
