= Lido =

Lido may refer to:

== Geography ==
- Lido Beach (disambiguation), several places

=== Italy ===
- Lido di Classe, a seaside resort in the province of Ravenna
- Lido di Venezia or Venice Lido, an 11-kilometre-long (6.8 mi) barrier island in the Venetian Lagoon, Venice

=== United States ===
- Di Lido Island, a neighborhood of the South Beach district of Miami Beach, Florida
- Lido Isle, Newport Beach, a man-made island, located in the harbor of Newport Beach, California
- Lido Key, a barrier island off the coast of Sarasota, Florida

=== Elsewhere ===
- Lido, Belgrade, a river beach on the Danube in Belgrade, Serbia
- Lido, Papua New Guinea, a village
- Lido Tikok, a census town in Tinsukia district in the Indian state of Assam
- Ruislip Lido, a reservoir and artificial beach in Ruislip, London, UK

== Music ==
- Lido (Clearlake album), 2001
- Lido (Th' Faith Healers album), 1992
- Lido (Darren Hayman album), 2012
- Lido (EP), by The Colourist, 2013

== People ==
- Lido (musician) (born 1992 as Peder Losnegård), Norwegian singer, songwriter, and record producer
- Lido Anthony "Lee" Iacocca (1924–2019), American automobile executive
- Lido Manetti (1899–1928), Italian-born American actor better known as Arnold Kent
- Lido Pimienta (born 1986), Colombian-Canadian musician, singer, and songwriter
- Lidó Rico (born 1968), Spanish expressive artist
- Lido Scarpetti (born 1954), Italian politician
- Lido Tomasi (born 1955), Italian ski jumper
- Lido Vieri (born 1939), Italian football player and manager

== Other uses ==
- Lido (swimming pool), a public swimming and lounge area
- Lido (typeface)
- Lido (Ueckermünde) or Strandhalle, a historic building, now used as a restaurant, in Western Pomerania, Germany
- Lido 14, a sailing dinghy
- Lido Theatre (disambiguation)
- Le Lido, a cabaret and burlesque dance show establishment on the Champs-Élysées in Paris, France
- LIDO (Lightweight Information Describing Objects), an XML schema for describing objects in collections

== See also ==
- The Lido (disambiguation)
- Ledo (disambiguation)
