= Leto (disambiguation) =

Leto is a goddess in Greek mythology.

Leto or LETO may also refer to:

As a name:

- Leto (surname), a list of people so named
- Leto (rapper), French rapper part of the French hip hop duo PSO Thug
- Leto Atreides (disambiguation), three fictional characters in Frank Herbert's Dune universe
- Leto (plant), a synonym of the genus Helogyne of the family Asteraceae
- Leto (moth), a moth genus containing the single species Leto venus
- Leto (film), a 2018 Russian film

Places

- Leto, Florida, an unincorporated community
- Leto Regio, a geological feature on Phoebe, a moon of Saturn
- 68 Leto, an asteroid

Music

- Leto (song), a song by the Soviet rock band Kino

LETO:

- Madrid-Torrejón Airport's ICAO code
