= Bistriški belič =

Bistriški belič (also bistriški fičnik) is private local currency, that started on 14 December 2013 in Ilirska Bistrica, Slovenia. The tokens are issued by Littoral Numismatic Society from Ilirska Bistrica. 1 belič is subdivided into 100 fičniks and the exchange rate is fixed at 1 belič = 40 EUR. The coins are designed by artist Romeo Volk, and adapted with computer by Matjaž Penko.

The purpose of the project is increasing local employment, supporting local culture and shortening food supply chains.

The silver and brass coins are made in the Slovak mint Kremnica, while golden coins are made in Slovenian Zlatarna Celje.

The design of the coins includes ship liburna, symbol of municipality, as well as leaves of olive tree (symbol of peace), oak (symbol of stability) and lime (symbol of Slovenia).
