= Agrokor =

Conglomerate largely centered in agribusiness

Agrokor d.d.

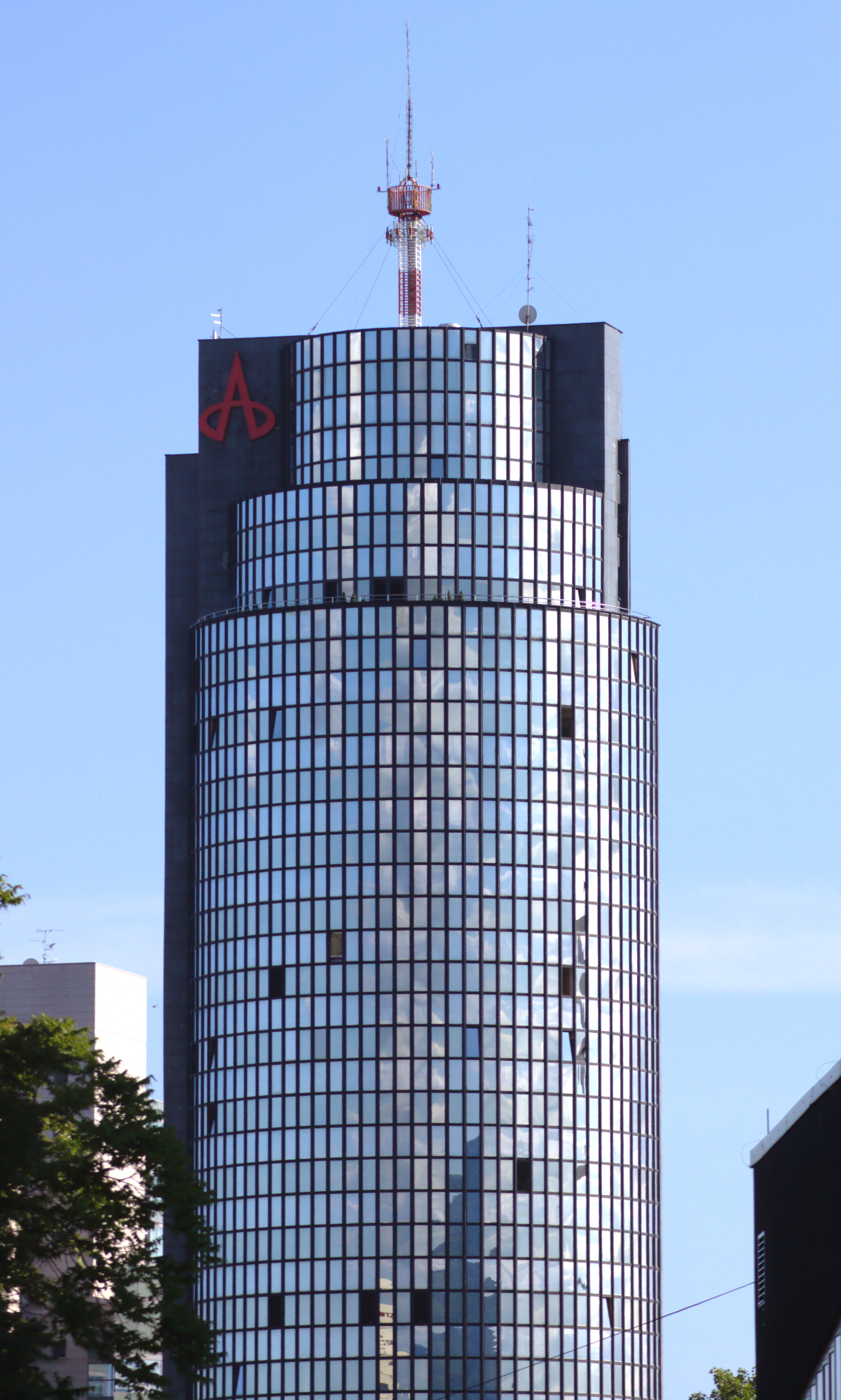
- Cibona Tower, former headquarters of Agrokor
- Type: Joint-stock company/ under Extraordinary Administration
- Industry: Food and soft drinks, retail
- Founded: 1989
- Founder: Ivica Todorić
- Defunct: October 13, 2022
- Successor: Fortenova Group
- Headquarters: Zagreb, Croatia
- Area served: Southeast and Central Europe
- Key people: Fabris Peruško (Extraordinary Commissioner)
- Revenue: ▼€5.223 billion (2018)
- Net income: ▼€192.48 million (2018)
- Total assets: ▼€4.278 billion (2018)
- Total equity: €0 (2018)
- Owner: Adria Group Holding B.V. (95.52%) (as of 2016)
- Number of employees: 50,903 (2017)
- Divisions: Retail Group, Food Group, Business Group
- Subsidiaries: Konzum (81%); Ledo (79%); Jamnica (80%)
- Website: nagodba.agrokor.hr

Agrokor (Croatian pronunciation: [âɡrokoːr]) was a conglomerate, largely centered in agribusiness, with headquarters in Zagreb, Croatia. Founded in 1976 as a flower grower, it became a joint stock company in 1989, with 100 percent ownership held by founder Ivica Todorić. It greatly expanded its operations in the following 25 years by acquiring several large companies in Croatia and Southeast Europe. The Agrokor group had an annual sales revenue of €6.465 billion in 2015, which made it the second-largest retail and eleventh-largest overall company in all of Southeast Europe. As of 31 December 2017, Agrokor employed around 50,900 people. On 1 April 2019, the assets of the demised Agrokor were consolidated within the newly founded Fortenova Group.

Within Agrokor, whose primary activity was production and distribution of food and beverages, and retail trade, among others; they were also the largest Croatian producer of mineral and spring water Jamnica, ice cream company Ledo, oil, margarine, and mayonnaise production company Zvijezda, the largest Croatian meat production company PIK Vrbovec, agricultural-industrial company Belje, the largest Croatian retailer Konzum, and the largest Croatian retail newsstand chain Tisak.

Ivica Todorić, founder of Agrokor, served as companies' CEO until April 2017. When Agrokor's financial difficulties became untenable, in March 2017 the government of Croatia hastily drafted and passed the Law on Extraordinary Administration Procedure in Enterprises of Systematic Importance for the Republic of Croatia, and by Todorić's activation of the Law in early April 2017 the Government forestalled the bankruptcy procedure and effectively took control over the company. Special administrator Ante Ramljak was appointed by the Commercial Court on 10 April 2017. Nevertheless, Ivica Todorić remained a nominal owner of Agrokor. Ministry of Economy, Entrepreneurship and Crafts published on its web site the Monthly Report on Economic and Financial Situation and the Implementation of Agrokor's Extraordinary Administration Measures for the period between 10 April to 10 May 2017, written by commissioner Ramljak, in which it was revealed that Agrokor didn't have a business plan for 2017 and was in a crisis of management. On 17 October 2017, the Croatian State Attorney Office launched a criminal prosecution against 13 members of the former governing and supervisory boards, including owner Ivica Todorić himself, on suspicions of abuse of power in economic business, forgery of official documents and breach of trade and business bookkeeping obligations. Ivica Todorić was reportedly residing in London, pending arrest and extradition. On 28 February 2018, Fabris Peruško was appointed as new Extraordinary Commissioner. More than 80% of Agrokor creditors voted in favor of the Settlement plan on 4 July 2018. Settlement was implemented on 1 April 2019 and business operations and assets were transferred to a new holding company according to the Settlement plan. Agrokor d.d. continued to be under Extraordinary Administration until all legal steps defined by the Settlement plan were fulfilled.

The extraordinary administration procedure in Agrokor has been closed and Agrokor d.d. no longer exists since it has been struck from the Court Registry in October 2022.

== History ==
=== 1976–1989: Foundation and early years ===
In 1976, Ivica Todorić founded a company for the production and sale of flowers and flower seedlings. The first greenhouses were built during the same year and the sale of the goods expanded to the rest of the country. Although the communist government of SFR Yugoslavia didn't fancy private companies, Todorić was able to hire more than 50 people in the first two fiscal years. By 1977, business was expanded by new programs: import and export of cereals, oil crops, fruit, and vegetables, with a significant increase in turnover and profits. The company soon become the leader in the flower industry.

=== 1989–2003: Domestic expansion ===
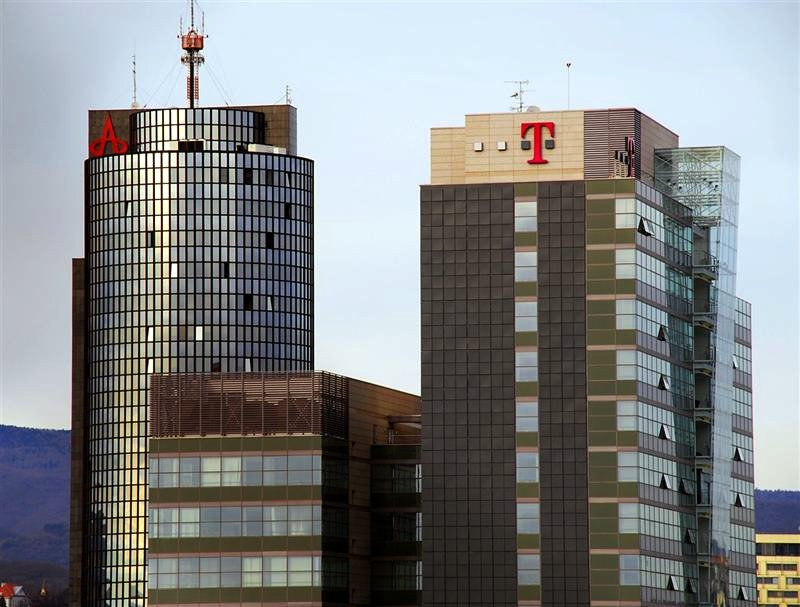
Cibona Tower behind Hoto Tower. Agrokor moved into Cibona Tower on 4 January 2000 and used it until 4 December 2017 when moved to another location.

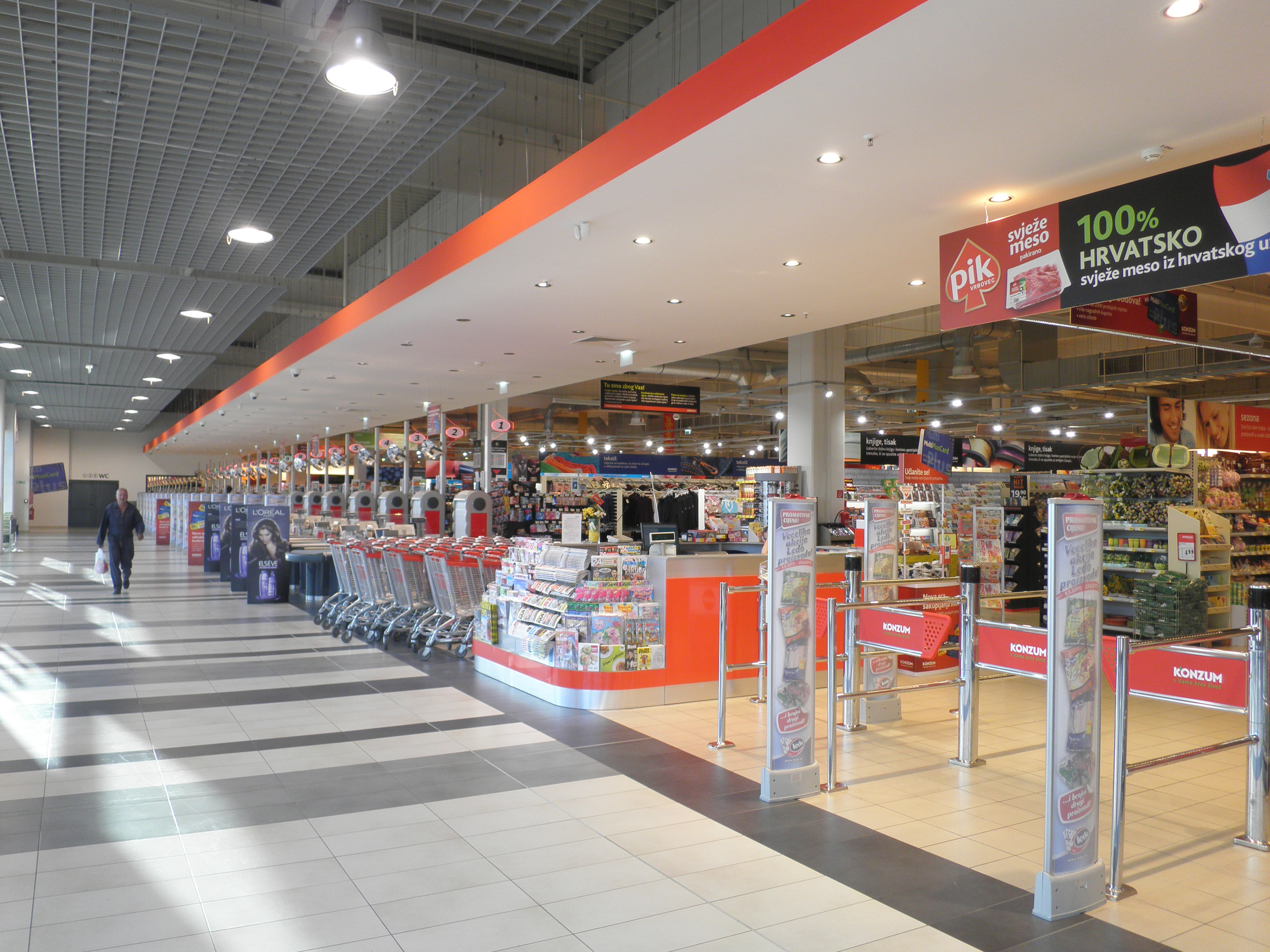
Konzum store in Split, Croatia

In 1989, when the laws become more liberal, Todorić founded the joint-stock company Agrokor. It entered the construction industry in the next two years and bought a factory for processing soy in Zadar.

In 1992, Agrokor became the majority owner of Jamnica and Agroprerada. In 1993, Agrokor became the majority owner of Zvijezda and DIP from Turopolje. The factory Jamnica, completely destroyed during the Croatian War of Independence, was rebuilt and the production started again. In 1994, a modern distribution system was introduced at Zvijezda and Jamnica factories. Jamnica received new product lines and began bottling into PET bottles. Agrokor became majority owner of Ledo, Konzum, Silos-mlinovi, Bobis and Solana Pag. In 1995, the first Super Konzum store was opened. The Agrokor Group was registered in 1997. The acquisition of Jaska vino d.d., which produces juices as well as quality wines named Podrum Mladina, took place in 1998.

Silos Mlinovi and SRC Andrijaševci were incorporated into PIK Vinkovci. This was followed by the start of construction work for a distribution center, which was also the largest investment project in the Group. In Čitluk (BiH), a new company for ice production named Čitluk Ledo was established in 2000. In the same year, Agrokor opened its largest distribution center in Croatia and the region. According to the European Bank for Reconstruction and Development, Agrokor had a credit worth of 170 million euros. Agrokor holds 97.4% of the shares of Sarajevski Kiseljak company.

Ledo and Irida Daruvar agreed on a strategic cooperation in 2001 for the distribution and sale of frozen fish. Soon afterward, Konzum started with wholesale. With the establishment of the company Mala Neretva Konzum, Agrokor entered the business of buying fruits and vegetables from the Neretva Valley. In 2002, Agrokor became the first supplier of biofuels in Croatia. In the same year, Agrokor bought the trading company Alastora. Shortly afterwards, Agrokor offered its 130 million euros worth bonds on the Luxembourg Stock Exchange.

=== 2003–2017: Regional expansion and dominance ===
In 2003, Agrokor acquired 51% of a trading company and distribution center TPDC Sarajevo (BiH) and 55.49% of the shares of Frikom (Serbia). In addition, the mineral water Jamnica received the EAUSCAR excellence award. In 2004, Sloboda from Osijek and Medijator from Dubrovnik were bought by Agrokor. In addition, Agrokor opened three new companies, Agrolaguna in Poreč, Fonyodi water filling plant and the Baldauf ice cream factory in Hungary. The new product line for Jana still mineral water was realized in 2004 and the flavored water Jana – Strawberry/Guava received EAUSCAR excellence award.

In 2005, Agrokor bought Dijamant (edible oil manufacturer) from Zrenjanin and Idea (supermarket chain) from Belgrade. It also acquired 99.76% of PIK Vrbovec and 67.92% of Belje and opened the first drugstore called Kozmo. The product Jana received an EAUSCAR excellence award in the same year as natural spring water.

In 2006, EBRD invested 110 million euros into the equity capital of Agrokor and thus gained 8.33% in the Group. In 2007, Agrokor bought Tisak, the largest retail newsstand chain in Croatia. Logistics and distribution center in Dugopolje opened in 2010. In the first three years, Agrokors' combined volume invests totaled 560 million kunas. In the same year, Agrokor bought 87.98% of Vupik from Vukovar, one of the largest agricultural producers in Croatia for 30 million kunas. The most modern winery in the region worth €20 million was opened at Belje in 2011. First biogas facility was opened in Gradec in 2012.

In 2014, with the largest transaction in the region's history, Agrokor become the owner of the Slovenian Mercator trading chain. The value of the transaction was 544 million euros. In 2017, Agrokor sold Kozmo.

=== 2017–2019: Insolvency and government's intervention ===
In January 2017, Moody's lowered Agrokor's rating from B2 to B3 and at the same time increased the possibility of companies bankruptcy, and later lowered Agrokor's rating four more times by June. Agrokor's bonds started losing value. In February 2017, Moody's reduced the prospects for Agrokor's rating from stable to negative. In April 2017, the government passed a law, nicknamed Lex Agrokor, that allowed the government to appoint an executive with a special crisis management team to steer a restructuring of companies with more than 5,000 employees who were in financial troubles.

More than a third of Agrokor's debt in early 2017 was said to be held by Russia's two biggest banks, including the state-owned Sberbank; the Russian ambassador to Croatia's public threat to Agrokor in February 2017 was seen by Croatian analysts as a sign that Agrokor's problems had a geopolitical dimension and were being instrumentalised by Russia to expand its influence and exert pressure.

On 7 April 2017, Agrokor's management filed a request for activation of Lex Agrokor, drafted and passed by the government days prior, after which the Government appointed Ante Ramljak as Agrokor's extraordinary manager. He started negotiating with banks and suppliers in order to rescue the company from bankruptcy.

On 9 October 2017, Ramljak announced that he had filed criminal charges against Ivica Todorić and his associates for tampering with the company's financial statements. The revised audit of Agrokor's reports showed a net loss in 2016 of 11 billion kunas ($1.73 billion) and in 2015 of 3.6 billion kunas against a net profit of 1.2 billion kunas reported by the Todorić management; the value of Agrokor's net worth for 2015 and 2016 was reduced by 22 billion kuna.

Later in October 2017, the State Attorney Office launched a criminal prosecution of 13 members of the governing and supervisory boards and 2 auditors on charges of abuse of power in economic business, forgery of official documents and breach of trade and business bookkeeping obligation. Ivica Todorić, still a nominal owner of Agrokor, was charged with false accounting, fraud by false representation, and abuse of position — amounting to a total alleged fraud worth about 110 million Euros. In a series of website publications, Ivica Todorić rejected the charges and accused the Croatian government of political persecution.

On 28 February 2018, Fabris Peruško was appointed as new Extraordinary Commissioner. More than 80% of Agrokor creditors voted in favor of the Settlement plan at a hearing held on 4 July 2018.

On 26 September 2019 in Cleveland, Fabris Peruško was presented with the Turnaround and Transaction Award (TMA) for the financial restructuring of Agrokor, proclaimed by the industry in the US to be the most significant international procedure of its kind in the world in the 'international transaction of the year' category and one of the world's 12 most significant international restructuring procedures in 2018.

The Extraordinary Administration Procedure was recognized as an insolvency procedure in England and Wales in November 2017, in Switzerland in February 2018 and in the US, pursuant to Chapter 15, in November 2018. By Regulation of the European Parliament and Council, in July 2018 the Extraordinary Administration Procedure Act was enlisted among the acts recognized as insolvency procedures on the entire EU territory.

Settlement was implemented on 1 April 2019 and business operations and assets were transferred to a new holding company, Fortenova Group, according to the Settlement plan.

== Acquisitions ==
Agrokor's core businesses are the production and distribution of food and drinks and retail, and over the years the group acquired several large Croatian companies in those sectors:

- Jamnica – the largest water bottling company in Croatia, established in the 1830s and acquired by Agrokor in 1992.
- Zvijezda – the largest cooking oil and margarine factory in the country, established in 1916 by Samuel David Alexander and acquired in 1993.
- Konzum – the largest supermarket chain in the country which operates over 600 stores in Croatia, Bosnia and Herzegovina and Serbia. Founded as "Unikonzum" in 1957, the company was acquired by Agrokor in 1994
- Ledo – the largest ice cream and frozen food manufacturer in Croatia, established in 1976 and acquired in 1994.
- PIK Vrbovec – the largest meat manufacturer in the country, acquired in 2005.
- Belje – the largest agricultural company in the country, acquired in 2005.
- Agrolaguna – winemaking, olive growing, and cattle farming company acquired in 2005.
- Tisak – the largest chain of newsstands in the country and the biggest retailer of newspapers and tobacco products. Agrokor acquired a 54 percent majority stake in Tisak in 2007.

Agrokor also acquired or founded a number of companies in the region, including the Serbian ice cream manufacturer Frikom, water bottling companies Sarajevski kiseljak (in Bosnia and Herzegovina) and Fonyodi (in Hungary) and others.

Several of Agrokor's Croatian subsidiaries are listed on the Zagreb Stock Exchange (ZSE) and Ledo is included in its official share index CROBEX as of September 2010.

For approaching international capital markets, Agrokor had to receive a rating by a rating agency as this is a must to give potential investors a benchmark. Without the ratings of Standard & Poor's and Moody's, Agrokor could not have issued two major bonds (one at the end of 2009 about 400 million, one in 2011 about 150 million). In April 2012, Standard & Poor's also revised the outlook on Agrokor's ‘B’ rating to positive from stable.

Agrokor had to be considered by the Croatian market regulator Croatian Competition Agency (Croatian: Agencija za zaštitu tržišnog natjecanja, AZTN) for some of its acquisitions. It requested approval of acquisition of Mercator where Agrokor will have to shut down some retail locations in Croatia.

In June 2014, Agrokor finalized the acquisition of an 80.75% stake in Mercator, which is the biggest retail chain in Slovenia, and throughout the Balkans, with over 2000 retail stores. On 27 June 2014, Agrokor acquired the majority stake of Poslovni sistem Mercator and became its majority owner. The total value of the transaction amounts to €544 million, out of which €324 million are for the acquisition of 100 percent of shares, and the rest to be used for deleveraging Mercator's financial position and for working capital requirements of Mercator's operations.

== See also ==
- Economy of Croatia
- Privatization in Croatia
