= Dijamant =

Serbian edible oil company

Coordinates: 45°23′21.5″N 20°25′18″E

- Official logo
- Native name: Dijamant DOO
- Type: Private limited company
- Industry: Consumer goods
- Founded: 1 July 1997; 29 years ago (Current form); 1938; 88 years ago (Historical)
- Headquarters: Temišvarski drum 14, Zrenjanin, Serbia
- Number of locations: Distribution centers: Zrenjanin, Vrbas, Belgrade, Cacak, Nis
- Area served: Serbia, Bosnia and Herzegovina, FYR Macedonia, Montenegro, Croatia.
- Key people: Vladimir Milović (director); Anastasia Cvetković Čučulis (director); Vladimir Antonić (director)
- Products: Edible oil, Mayonnaise, Margarine, Ketchup
- Brands: Dobro jutro, Omegol, Dijamant način, Kikindski mlin
- Revenue: ▲€206.75 million (2021)
- Net income: ▲€19.24 million (2021)
- Total assets: ▼€151.55 million (2021)
- Total equity: ▼€79.03 million (2021)
- Owner: Fortenova Group (100%)
- Number of employees: 801 (2023)
- Subsidiaries: Kikindski mlin a.d.
- Website: www.dijamant.rs

Dijamant (Serbian Cyrillic: Дијамант, lit. 'Diamond') is a Serbian edible oil manufacturing company headquartered in Zrenjanin. It is owned by the MK Group.

== History ==
The company was established in 1938 as Oil Factory "Beograd", based in Zrenjanin. Following World War II, in 1946, the company became a government-owned enterprise named "2. oktobar".

1974 A new bottling plant was built with a line for filling oil in PVC bottles.

In 2005, the Croatian conglomerate Agrokor Group became the majority shareholder of Dijamant. With the purchase, Agrokor came to own two large edible oil manufacturers, "Zvijezda d.d. Zagreb" in Croatia and "Dijamant a.d. Zrenjanin" in Serbia.

In 2021, by the decision of APR, the transfer of Agrokor's share in the Dijamant company to the Fortenova Group was registered, which made the Fortenova Group the only owner of the company with a 100% of share.

The decision to change the legal form of the company from a joint stock company to a limited liability company was made on August 23, 2021. year, and the decision was registered by the Decision of the APR on August 26, 2021. yr.

== About ==
Numerous domestic and international recognitions are proof of the leadership position that Dijamant has in the production of oils, vegetable fats and margarine.

The long-standing leadership position of the Dijamant brand in the categories of edible oil, mayonnaise, table and spreadable margarine was confirmed by the global agency Nielsen, based on data collected for the retail market, which declared Dijamant the number one brand in Serbia in 2021.

They are a significant factor in the agricultural sector, especially in the field of oilseed production, which implies the development of partnership relations with manufacturers, as well as logistical coverage for the purpose of purchase and safe storage of oilseed crops.

Dijamant is recognized by its partners and consumers as a socially responsible company, which pays great attention to issues of environmental protection and improving the quality of life in the community.

They are especially dedicated to the "Follow the Sunflower" projects, which is focused on the needs of people with Down syndrome and their inclusion in social processes, as well as "Young Pastry Chefs", which is dedicated to talented high school students.

== Brands ==
- Edible oil

Edible refined sunflower oil, for decades was the main product of Dijamant. Products that are procedure from the refined oil obtained are sunflower seeds from domestic arable land. Apart from sunflower oil, now under the brand Dijamant, it offers Mediterranean oil and palm oil for frying.

- Dobro jutro

The first spreadable margarine under the Dobro Jutro brand was introduced to the domestic market in 1980. Over time, the range expanded to include several variants, such as Dobro Jutro Dairy, Diet Dobro Jutro, Dobro Jutro Light, and Dobro Jutro with butter. The products are formulated to provide essential fatty acids and vitamins, and are marketed as free from cholesterol and trans fatty acids.

- Mayonnaise

Production of Dijamant mayonnaise started in 1988. Dijamant mayonnaise is produced using the traditional recipe of fresh egg yolk and no preservatives. The wide range includes delicatessen, salad and light mayonnaise.

- Omegol

Omegol oil and margarine are products rich in ALA omega-3 fatty acid, which contributes to the maintenance of normal blood cholesterol levels. They contain an optimal ratio of omega 3 and omega 6 fatty acids and are a natural source of vitamin E.
