= Jamnica (company) =

Croatian water bottling company

Jamnica plus d.o.o.
- Type: Limited Liability Company
- Industry: Beverages
- Founded: October 18, 1828; 197 years ago
- Headquarters: Zagreb, Croatia
- Key people: Siniša Mužić (CEO)
- Products: Jamnica, Jana, Jana Ice Tea, Jana vitamin, Botanica, Toco, Prosport, Progame
- Revenue: ▲HRK 1.1 billion (2021)
- Net income: ▲HRK 81.4 million (2021)
- Number of employees: 955
- Parent: Fortenova Group
- Website: www.jamnica.company

Jamnica plus LLC is a Croatian limited liability company which produces carbonated mineral water, as well as other bottled waters and soft drinks. It was founded on 18 October 1828, and operates as a part of the Beverages Group, an organizational division within the Fortenova Group.

Through investments in modernization, development and new technologies, the Beverages Group has reached the position of one of the most modern European producers of natural mineral waters and soft drinks. Its total annual production rate of more than 600 million litres makes it the largest producer in this part of Europe. Jamnica's revenue in 2005 was 793.55 million HRK (c. $130 million). Jamnica's total revenue in 2011 reached HRK 1.2 billion. Jamnica made HRK 100.247 million profit before tax. Part of Jamnica plus LLC are the Jamnica bottling plant in Pisarovina and the Jana bottling plant in Gorica Svetojanska near Jastrebarsko. Since 2020, Jamnica plus has been operating as a part of the Beverages Group of the Fortenova Group. Along with Jamnica plus, the Beverages Group also includes Sarajevski kiseljak LLC in Bosnia and Herzegovina, Mg Mivela LLC in Serbia, Jamnica mineralna voda LLC in Slovenia and Jamnica Water LLC in Hungary.

Jamnica plus, that is the Beverages Group, offers a wide range of brands including Jamnica, Botanica, Sarajevski kiseljak, Mg Mivela, Jana, Jana Ice Tea, Jana vitamin, Fruit-flavoured Jana, Sara, ProSport, ProGame, Sensation, Sky Cola, Barts and Toco.

== History ==
The tradition of Jamnica dates back to the 18th century. In 1772, Empress Maria Theresa sent samples of Jamnica for a chemical analysis, and Jamnica entered the registry of mineral water the same year. In 1823, the pharmacist Josip Mikšić conducted the first quantitative scientific analysis of Jamnička kiselica.

The commercial use of Jamnica started on 8 October 1828, with filling of the first bottles intended for the market. This date is still celebrated as the Jamnica Day. The same year, on 18 November, pharmacist Đuro Augustin conducted the second scientific analysis of Jamnica. In 1830, a bathhouse and a spa, opened in Jamnica and remained in operation until 1870. In 1852, a new spa building was built by the famous architect from Zagreb Janko Jambrišak.

During 1863 and 1864, the spa at Jamnica was visited by the bishop Josip Juraj Strossmayer, along with the Croatian politician Ante Starčević and the Croatian writer August Harambašić, who, during his stay, devised Jamnica's most famous slogan:

"Drinking Jamnica water when you’re young and old will extend your life and keep your heartbeat bright and bold."

— (August Harambašić)

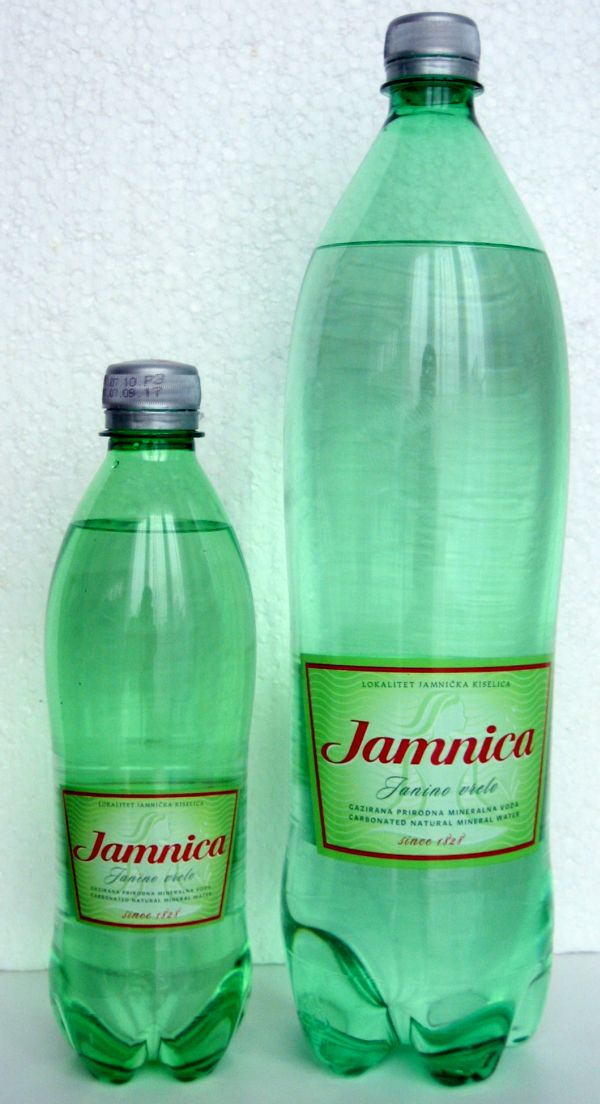
Jamnica 1.5 and 0.5 litre PET bottles.

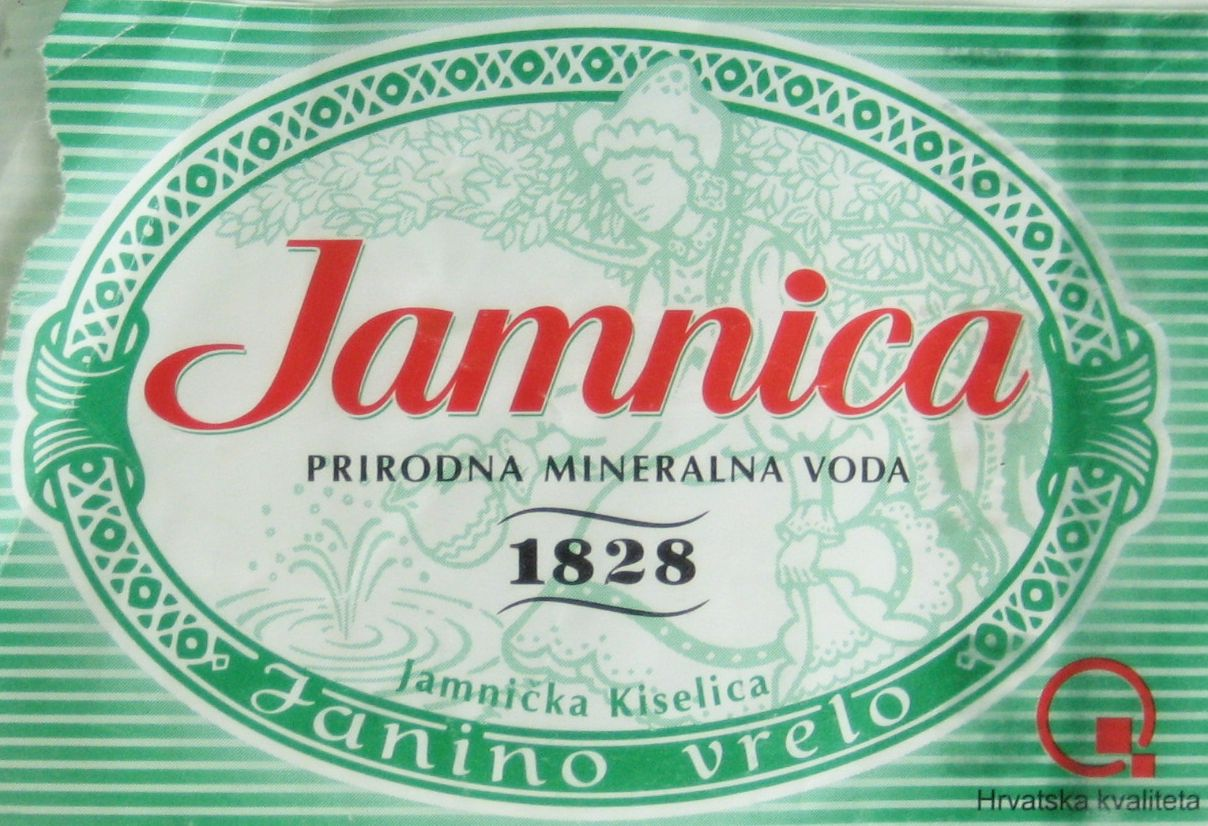
An old label from a bottle of Jamnica mineral water.

At the end of the 19th century, Jamnica was sold to Vilim Lovrenčić who modernized the bottling plant and organized sales in 1899. Mira Vrbanić and Margita Rottenbucher bought the spring in 1926. A new, modernized water pumping site was built in 1932.

Jamnička kiselica was continuously produced until World War II, when the production died out. In 1961, Agrokombinat from Zagreb took over the springs and revitalized the production. In 1962, a new spring called Jamnica 62 was drilled. In the course of 1964, the bottling plant was modernized and two automatic lines were set up. On 1 August 1967, Marijan Badel company bought the Jamnička kiselica mineral water plant from Agrokombinat. A new spring called Janino vrelo was drilled in 1973. A new bottling plant was opened in 1978 at Jamnička Kiselica.

In May 1982, the product line was extended to include new low-calorie mineral water-based beverages named Jana, which came in two refreshing flavours: lemon and orange. In 1986, a new mineral water–based beverage called Sprint tonic was launched and recommended to athletes and those who engage in additional physical activity.

Jamnica has been operating as an independent company since 1990. On 7 October 1991, the Jamnica bottling plant was shelled, and the facilities, mineral water filling lines, packaging and finished products were all damaged by July 1992.

On 28 December 1992, the company was converted into a joint-stock company, and its new majority owner, Agrokor JSC, started the plant renovation.

During 1993, investments were made into three state-of-the-art bottling lines, freight vehicles and forklifts were purchased, distribution centres in Zagreb, Split, Rijeka and Osijek were organized, and a new concept of capillary distribution was introduced. On 10 September 1993, Jamnica was shelled for the second time in the course of the war.

In July 1994, a new bottle filling line was put into operation. The filling of Jamnica into the original 1.5 litre PET bottle started. August 1995, saw the beginning of the production of non-carbonated Jamnica mineral water, and the redesign of the label and company logo took place in December of the same year. The filling of the Jamnica products into the 0.5 litre PET bottles started in July 1996.

By purchasing its ownership stake in Mladina JSC in 1998, Jamnica ventured into wine production as well.

In May 1999, a new juice bottling plant was put into operation in Jastrebarsko, and Jamnica launched its natural fruit juices called Juicy.

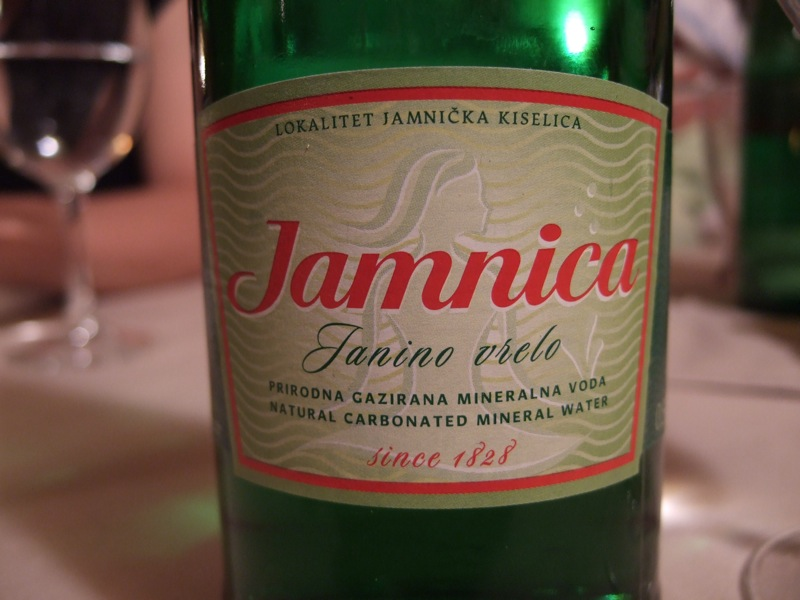
The label on the bottle of Jamnica.

In 2000, Jamnica became the majority owner of Sarajevski kiseljak, the largest and most modern mineral water factory with rich history and tradition in Bosnia and Herzegovina.

On July 18, 2002, Jamnica started the commercial production of the natural spring water Jana. The production of soft drinks Juicy fruits and fruit juices TO began in December of the same year.

Since 2003 it has been traded on the Zagreb Stock Exchange as JMNC-R-A.

In July 2004, Jamnica became the majority owner of the Fonyodi mineral water bottling plant in Hungary.

Jamnica own several other brands including the Mivela brand from Serbia. In addition, manufacturing and distribution centers are located in Slovenia, Serbia and the United States.

20 March 2008 saw the arrival of the “big four” of the Smart functional beverages (Smart Antiox, Smart Active, Smart Snack and Smart Fit) from Jamnica. In August of the same year, Jamnica introduced its new products based on natural mineral water: the flavoured mineral water Jamnica Sensation in lemon-lime and mandarin-tangelo flavours, and a new isotonic beverage Jamnica Pro Sport. On 28 October 2008, Jamnica celebrated its 180th jubilee.

== Jana ==
Jana natural mineral water is one of the most famous brands of the Jamnica plus company. It is bottled in Gorica Svetojanska near Jastrebarsko. Due to the extraordinary depth of its 800-metre-deep (2,600 ft) spring situated under the ancient dolomite rocks, Jana is characterized by an exceptional mineral composition and a particularly prominent ratio of calcium and magnesium.

The water originates from Saint Jana from the Žumberak Mountains in Croatia. Its taste is described as "smooth with appealing freshness and silky texture". It entered the market of North America in 2006.

It received the Eauscar Award for "Highest Quality" at Aqua-Expo in Paris in 2005. The brand is certified carbon-neutral. In 2022, Jana won the world's highest award for product quality, the Grand Gold Quality Award, at the prestigious Monde Selection competition organized by the International Quality Institute.
