= Idea (supermarkets) =

Serbian supermarket chain

- Official logo
- Industry: Retail
- Founded: 1992; 34 years ago
- Headquarters: Belgrade, Serbia
- Number of locations: 276 retail stores (as of 2018)
- Services: Supermarkets, convenience stores
- Parent: Alta Retail
- Website: www.idea.rs

Idea (Serbian Cyrillic: Идеа) is a retail chain in Serbia, part of Alta Retail. Through a small and super format, IDEA is intended for everyday shopping.

== History ==
The first IDEA store, then owned by Croatian Agrokor, was opened in 2005 in Belgrade. After Mercator-S and Idea merged in 2014, Idea became part of the Mercator Group, and since April 2021 it has been an integral part of the Fortenova Group retail. By 2022, the company has developed a network of almost 300 IDEA and IDEA Super stores in almost 100 cities in Serbia.

In addition to supermarkets, customers can order items from the IDEA range of products via the IDEA online store.

In addition to selling products made by Serbian and global brands in retail stores and through the online store, IDEA has also created its own brand K plus, which has more than 2,000 products in its range. According to research by the GfK agency, the K plus brand is one of the most recognizable brands in Serbia.

As part of the Fortenova Group, IDEA as a partner and organizer participates in many humanitarian actions, among the most famous is the “IDEA Caravan”.

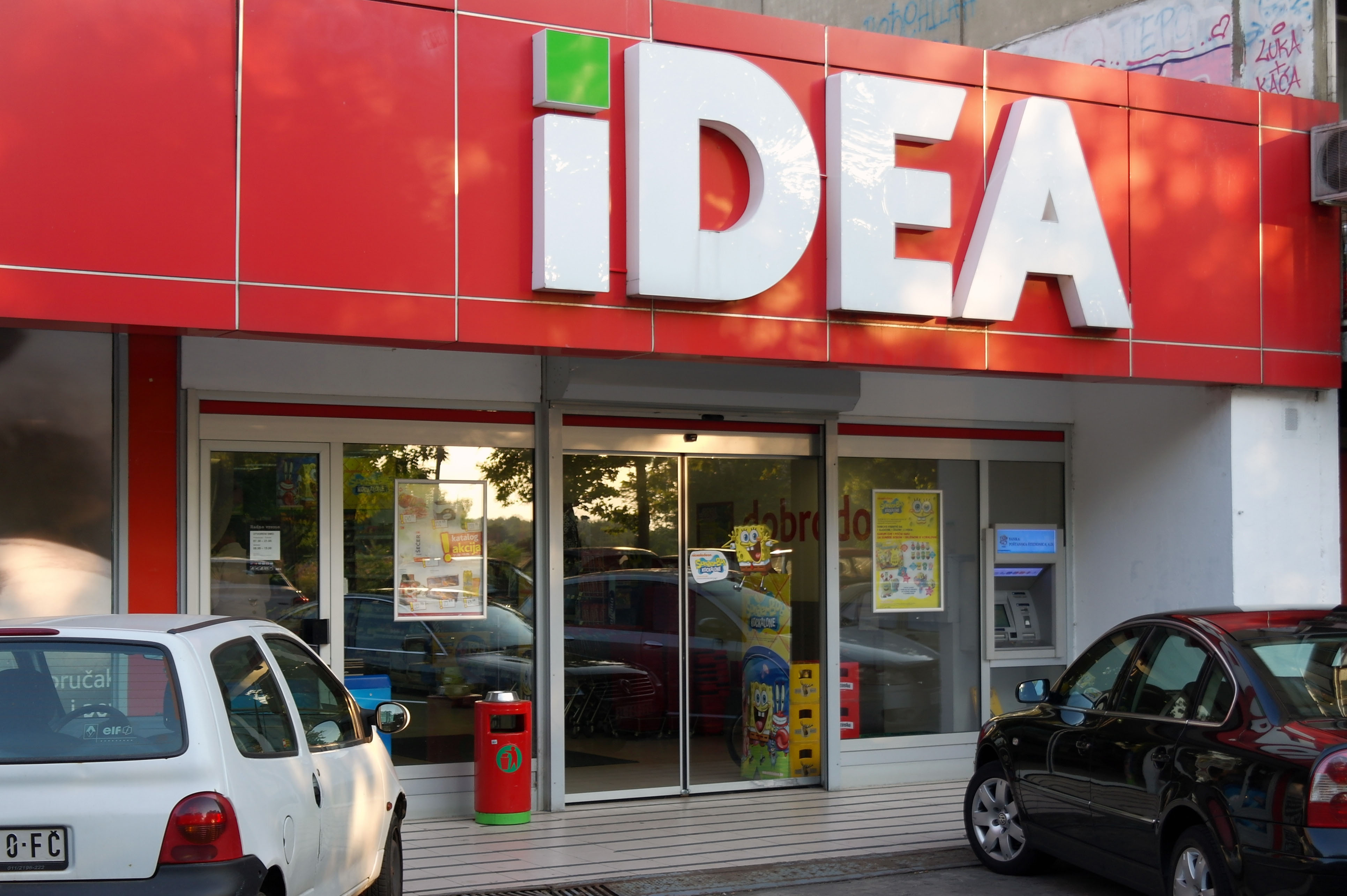
IDEA store in Belgrade

== See also ==
- List of supermarket chains in Serbia
