= Lido Beach =

Lido Beach may refer to:

- Lido Beach, Florida, a beach on the Lido Key barrier island off the coast of Sarasota, Florida, U.S.
- Lido Beach, Hong Kong, a beach in Ting Kau, New Territories, Hong Kong
- Lido Beach, Mogadishu, a beach in Mogadishu, Somalia
- Lido Beach, New York, a hamlet and census-designated place in Nassau County, New York, U.S.

== See also ==
- Lido (disambiguation)
