= Mercator (retail) =

Retail company in Slovenia

Mercator d.o.o.
- Company type: Limited liability company
- Industry: Retail stores
- Founded: December 5, 1989; 36 years ago
- Headquarters: Dunajska cesta 107, Ljubljana, Slovenia
- Key people: Tomislav Đurić (President of the Manager Board)
- Brands: Mercator, Lumpi, Minute, Bio Zone, Free Zone, Olea, Dax, Finesse, Buddy, Kitty, Maxen
- Revenue: 1,200,000,000 euro (2018)
- Net income: −10,900,000 euro (2018)
- Total equity: ▲ Fortenova Group
- Number of employees: 20,300 (2021)
- Website: Corporate website

Poslovni sistem Mercator, d.o.o. (pronounced [mɛɾˈkaːtɔɾ]; Latin for 'merchant') is a Slovenian business conglomerate. One of the largest companies in Slovenia by annual revenue, it is the parent company of the Mercator Group of supermarket chains. It is wholly owned by the Croatian joint-stock company Fortenova Group.

In addition to Slovenia, Mercator Group is also present in Serbia, Montenegro, Bosnia and Herzegovina, and Croatia. The core business of the Mercator Group is the retail of everyday consumer goods through a diversified retail network across Slovenia, Serbia, Bosnia and Herzegovina, and Montenegro.

Mercator dates back to 1949 and the founding of the wholesale company Živila Ljubljana – the predecessor of Poslovni sistem Mercator, d. d., which was reorganised as a limited liability company on 4 July 2022. At the time of its founding, Mercator sold goods from a warehouse. Today, however, Mercator is one of the most modern retailers in the region with 20,300 employees across the entire Mercator Group.

Since April 2021, Mercator has been owned by Fortenova Group It acquired the shares from Agrokor, which had bought the Slovenian retailer in 2014. Fortenova initially owned 89.11% of Mercator, increasing its stake to 90.005% after the general meeting held in September 2021. Fortenova became the sole owner of Mercator on 1 April 2022, after forcing out minority shareholders. Then, in mid-April, the General Assembly approved the delisting of the company's shares from the stock exchange.

Mercator aims to establish state-of-the-art store concepts on all of its markets. Its continued growth is based on efficient business models that include an attractive offer for customers, long-term partnerships with local and regional suppliers, new store concepts, as well as operational efficiency and cost efficiency across all the areas of its business.

== Retail markets of the Mercator Group ==
=== Slovenia ===
Poslovni sistem Mercator, d.o.o., is the largest retail company in Slovenia with 1,014 retail units, 466 of which are located in Slovenia, 341 in Serbia, 128 in Montenegro, and 79 in Bosnia and Herzegovina. It also boasts 163 franchise stores in Slovenia (as of 31 December 2021).

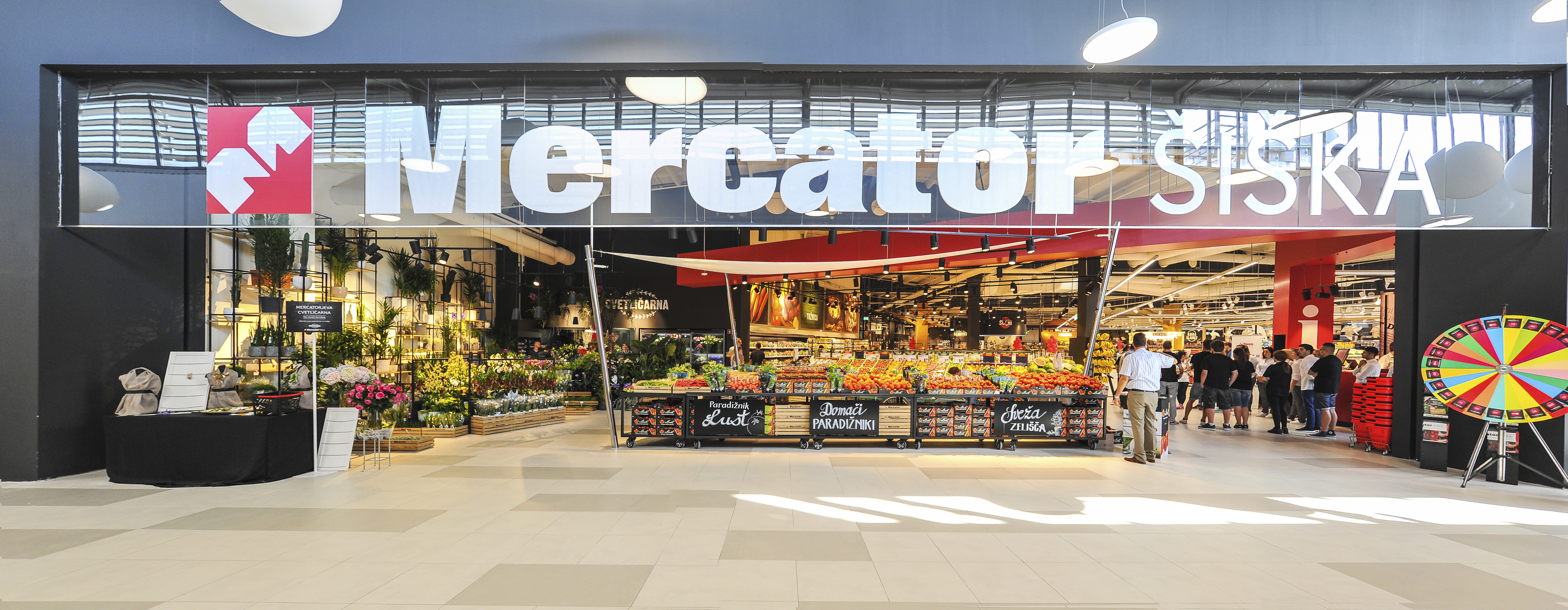
Mercator Šiška Slovenia, which was recently listed by IGD, the world's leading professional organisation, as one of the 15 stores in the world worth visiting.

The company's core business is the sale of consumer goods, with a separate business area for homeware (M Tehnika, 41 stores) and wholesale (13 Cash&Carry centres).

Mercator's two independent production companies Mercator – Emba, d.o.o., and Mercator IP, d.o.o. are also active on the Slovenian market. Moreover, Mercator also owns the company M – Energija, d.o.o., which runs the Maxen self-service gas stations.

Mercator was the first retailer of everyday products in Slovenia with its own e-commerce website, the first retailer to set up self-service checkouts, the first retailer to enable shopping with the M Sken and M Sken MOBILE apps, and the first retailer to develop the Moj M mobile platform with the M Pay mobile wallet.

Mercator is integrating innovative solutions with its services and offers, changing and upgrading them, adapting them to the needs of customers, and replacing some of them with new ones. This way, it seeks to improve both the shopping experience and its own performance, meet customers demands and perceived value, thus developing stores that are tailored to the customer's needs.

Mercator has operated its online store for over twenty years. It is a key part of the company's digital strategy, aimed at providing a consistent shopping experience across all platforms. The company continues to update its services to better match the habits of online shoppers.

Mercator is investing heavily in the digitisation of its business processes and in digital communication, which it considers to be one of its strategic segments. Thus, in 2021, Mercator introduced a new digital communication channel and an innovative ecosystem that provides users with a holistic experience both inside and outside the digital environment, and goes beyond the limits of traditional communication. Mercator was the first retailer to launch its own media, the content video platform www.msoseska.tv. It is aimed at a broad spectrum of users, regardless of their age and lifestyle, who want to view short and useful content – not only for entertainment, but also whenever they need advice, want to save time, or want to make their work easier. Certain pieces of content on M Soseska (M Neighbourhood) also reflect Mercator's involvement in the Slovenian culture and sports, which Mercator has been supporting for many years.

== Regional presence of the Mercator Group ==
In addition to Slovenia, Mercator operates as a local retailer in three other markets in the region: Serbia, Bosnia and Herzegovina, and Montenegro.

=== Serbia ===
The first Mercator store in Belgrade, Serbia opened in 2002. Today, Mercator S, d.o.o., Serbia has a total of 341 stores in many Serbian cities under the Mercator, Roda, and Idea brands.

=== Montenegro ===
Mercator entered the Montenegrin market in 2007. It has been operating under the Idea brand since 2017.

=== Bosnia and Herzegovina ===
In 2000, Mercator opened its first store in Sarajevo. In 2014, all stores owned by Mercator BH, d.o.o., Bosnia and Herzegovina were transferred to Konzum. In September 2017, all 83 stores were reacquired by Mercator BH, d.o.o., Bosnia and Herzegovina.

=== Croatia ===
In 2014, Mercator's operations in Croatia were acquired by Konzum. Mercator H, d.o.o., Croatia, has retained the real estate operations.

== See also ==
- Agrokor
- List of supermarket chains in Slovenia
- List of supermarket chains (worldwide)
