= List of tallest buildings in Slovenia =

The list of tallest buildings in Slovenia ranks buildings in Slovenia by official height. The tallest building in Slovenia is currently the 89 m (292 ft) high Crystal Palace in Ljubljana, which stands 20 stories high. The tallest non-building structure in Slovenia is Trbovlje Chimney with a height of 364 metres.

== Tallest buildings ==
Was the tallest building and church in Slovenia upon completion

This list ranks Slovenia's buildings that stand at least 50 metres (160 ft). Data source is emporis.com, unless otherwise notes.

Rank	Name	Image	Location	Height Metres / feet	Floors	Year	Notes
1	Crystal Palace		Ljubljana	89 metres (292 ft)	22	2011	The tallest building in Slovenia.
2	Spektra- northern tower		Ljubljana	85 meters (278 ft)	21	2023	The tallest residential buildings in Slovenia. Also known as Klagenfurt twins (Celovška dvojčka).
2	Spektra - southern tower		Ljubljana	85 meters (278 ft)	21	2023	The tallest residential buildings in Slovenia. Also known as Klagenfurt twins (Celovška dvojčka).
3	Intercontinental Hotel Ljubljana		Ljubljana	81.5 metres (267 ft)	21	2017	The tallest building in central Ljubljana.
4	Grand Plaza Hotel Ljubljana		Ljubljana	81 metres (270 ft)	22	2021	The second tallest building in central Ljubljana.
5	World Trade Center Ljubljana		Ljubljana	75 metres (250 ft)	18	1993	The tallest building in Slovenia before 2010.
5	Situla		Ljubljana	75 metres (250 ft)	21	2013	
6	Nebotičnik		Ljubljana	70 metres (229 ft)	13	1933	The first skyscraper in Slovenia, it was the tallest building in Balkans and the ninth tallest building in Europe at the time of completion.
7	Trg Republike 3 (TR3)		Ljubljana	69 metres (226 ft)	17	1973	
7	St. Joseph Church		Ljubljana	69 metres (226 ft)	N/A	1922	The tallest church in Slovenia.
8	Petrol building		Ljubljana	67 metres (220 ft)	16	1979	
8	BTC City Skyscraper		Ljubljana	67 metres (220 ft)	12	2000	
8	Betnavski park		Maribor	67 metres (220 ft)	3x17	2009/10	The tallest buildings in Slovenia outside Ljubljana.
9	S2		Ljubljana	66.6 metres (219 ft)	15	1981	
10	Avtotehna		Ljubljana	66 metres (217 ft)	16	1969	
11	UKC Maribor		Maribor	65.5 metres (215 ft)	16	1973	
12	St. James Church		Ljubljana	65 metres (210 ft)	N/A	1615	
13	BS3		Ljubljana	64 metres (210 ft)	21	1981	
13	Delo skyscraper		Ljubljana	64 metres (210 ft)	15	1981	
14	Eda center		Nova Gorica	62 metres (200 ft)	15	2011	
14	St. George Church		Slovenske Konjice	62 meters (200 fr)	N/A	13th century	The bell tower was rebuilt in the 18th century.
15	Metalka Building		Ljubljana	60 metres (200 ft)	15	1963	
15	TR2		Ljubljana	60 metres (200 ft)	12	1975	
15	Murska Sobota Cathedral		Murska Sobota	60 metres (200 ft)	N/A	1912	
15	St. Martin's Parish Church		Šmartno pri Litiji	60 metres (200 ft)	N/A	1901	
16	R5		Ljubljana	59 metres (190 ft)	17	2010	
17	Radisson Blue Plaza Hotel		Ljubljana	58.5 metres (192 ft)	17	2012	
18	Basilica of Our Mother of Mercy, Maribor		Maribor	58 metres (190 ft)	N/A	1900	
18	Center Bellevue		Ljubljana	58 metres (190 ft)	17	2023	
19	Maribor Cathedral		Maribor	57 metres (190 ft)	N/A	1623	Originally had a bell tower 76 metres (250 ft) tall, which had to be reduced in size in 1792 because of a lightning strike.
19	St. George's Church		Ptuj	57 metres (190 ft)	N/A	1558	
20	Topniška towers		Ljubljana	3x56 metres (180 ft)	19	1970-72	Three towers with the same height.
21	Kranjski Nebotičnik		Kranj	55,2 meters (180 ft)	17	1964	The tallest building in Kranj.
22	Kvartet - tower A		Ljubljana	54 metres (177 ft)	15	2024	
22	Kvartet - tower B		Ljubljana	54 metres (177 ft)	15	2024	
22	Kvartet - tower C		Ljubljana	54 metres (177 ft)	15	2024	
22	Kvartet - tower D		Ljubljana	54 metres (177 ft)	15	2024	
23	Kardeljev trg 3		Velenje	53,1 (174 ft)	17	1981	
24	Assumption Cathedral		Koper	53 meters (174 ft)	N/A	1644	
24	Kardeljeva tower		Maribor	53 meters (174 ft)	16	1978	
25	Telekom Slovenia		Ljubljana	52 metres (171 ft)	12	1965	
26	Kardeljev trg 2		Velenje	51,9 meters (171 ft)	17	1984	
27	Hotel Lev		Ljubljana	50 metres (164 ft)		1964	
27	Peca		Ljubljana	50 metres (164 ft)	14	2020	

== Tallest proposed ==
Data source is emporis.com, unless otherwise noted.

Rank	Name	Location	Height feet / metres	Floors	Year proposed	Notes
1	Severnica tower	Ljubljana	100 m	21	2020	
1	Business Center Šiška	Ljubljana	100 m	22	2022	Stage one under construction.
2	Nordika	Ljubljana	82 m	24	2024	Construction permit obtained, start of construction planned for 2026.
3	Petrol Towers	Ljubljana	2x 70 m	N/A	2018	Proposed in 2018 but canceled in February 2021.
4	New commercial tower	Maribor	69.9 m	20	2026	Name of the tower currently unknown.
6	C-Tower	Ljubljana	60 m	N/A	2023	
7	Regentov kvart	Ljubljana	59 m	18		
8	Casa nova	Ljubljana	52 m	15	2026	
9	Regentov kvart	Ljubljana	50 m	15		
9	Reitenburg tower	Ljubljana	50 m	N/A	2026	Part of the wider Kolinska development.

== Currently under construction ==
Rank	Name	Location	Height feet / metres	Floors	Estimated year of completion	Notes
1	Emonika	Ljubljana	108 m	23	2027	
2	Kolinska	Ljubljana	65 m	18	N/A	Also known under the name K14.

== See also ==
- List of tallest buildings in Europe
