= BTC City =

Shopping mall in Ljubljana, Slovenia

Coordinates: 46°3′56.19″N 14°32′39.36″E

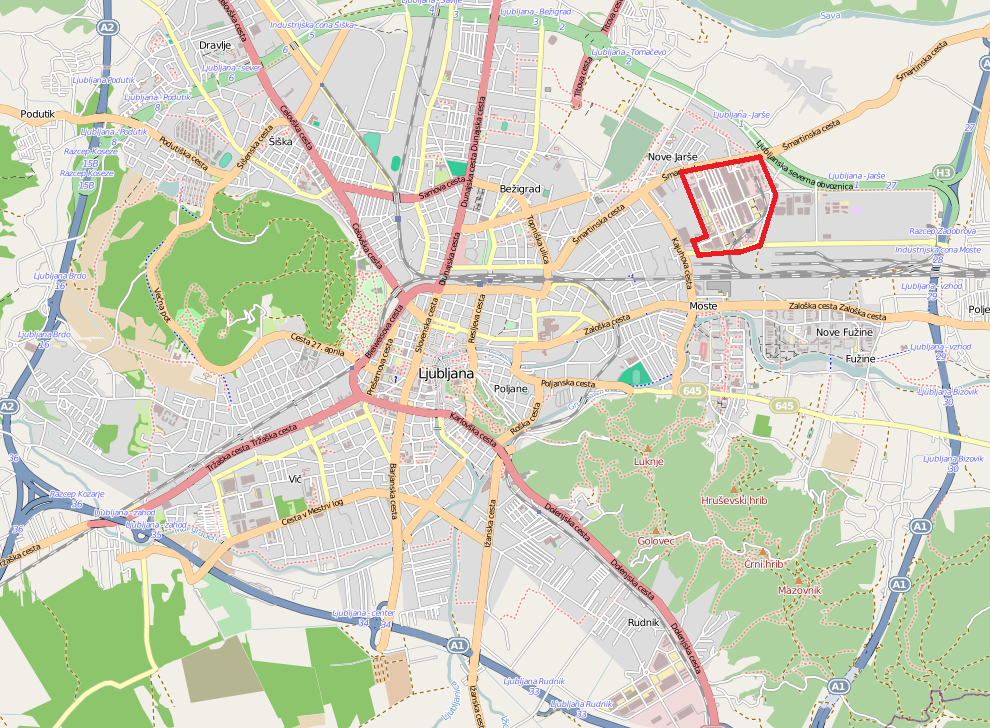
BTC City highlighted (top right) on a map of Ljubljana.

BTC City (Slovene: Družba BTC) is a shopping mall, sports, entertainment and business area in Ljubljana, Slovenia, with more than 500 shops. It is one of the largest shopping and entertainment complexes in Europe.

== History ==
In 1954, a company named Centralna skladišča (Central Warehouses) was founded with a founding contract. Central Warehouses expanded their operations by starting to carry out the warehousing activities also for other companies, which were not among the co-founders of the company. Due to the expansion of the activity and the extent of operations, the company changed its name to Javna skladišča (Public Warehouses). In 1975, the company became the largest goods and transport centre in former Yugoslavia. In the same year, Javna skladišča changed its name to Blagovno Transportni Center Ljubljana (Ljubljana Goods and Transport Centre, BTC). 1990 presented a turning point for BTC. In search and confirmation of the entrepreneurial freedom, the company decided to change its name to Blagovno Trgovinski Center (Goods and Shopping Centre) and the company, which, up to that point, managed warehousing space, transformed itself into a public limited company in 1990, becoming responsible for the selection of new, profitable, compatible and competitive programmes and business contents, and suitable infrastructure as well. First individual stores started opening. In 1993, when the management of the company was taken over by Jože Mermal, the empty warehousing facilities began to acquire a new, more attractive image, and the first shops formed in the renovated Hall A. In 1994, the company stocks were quoted on the Ljubljana Stock Exchange. In 1997, the public limited company BTC became an international capital company, as its shares were the listed at the London Stock Exchange as shares of the first Slovenian company. Soon afterwards, the Frankfurt and Munich Stock Exchanges followed.

== Facilities ==
BTC City has a total gross area of more than 250,000 m^{2}. It includes a main shopping mall called CityPark, 16 smaller shopping malls, a multiplex with twelve screens, the recently opened Radisson Blu Plaza Hotel Ljubljana, a market, a mini golf course, a waterpark with a spa center and an entertainment center with a casino, bowling, 3D cinema as well as two high rise office buildings. One of these, the Crystal Palace, is the tallest building in Slovenia.

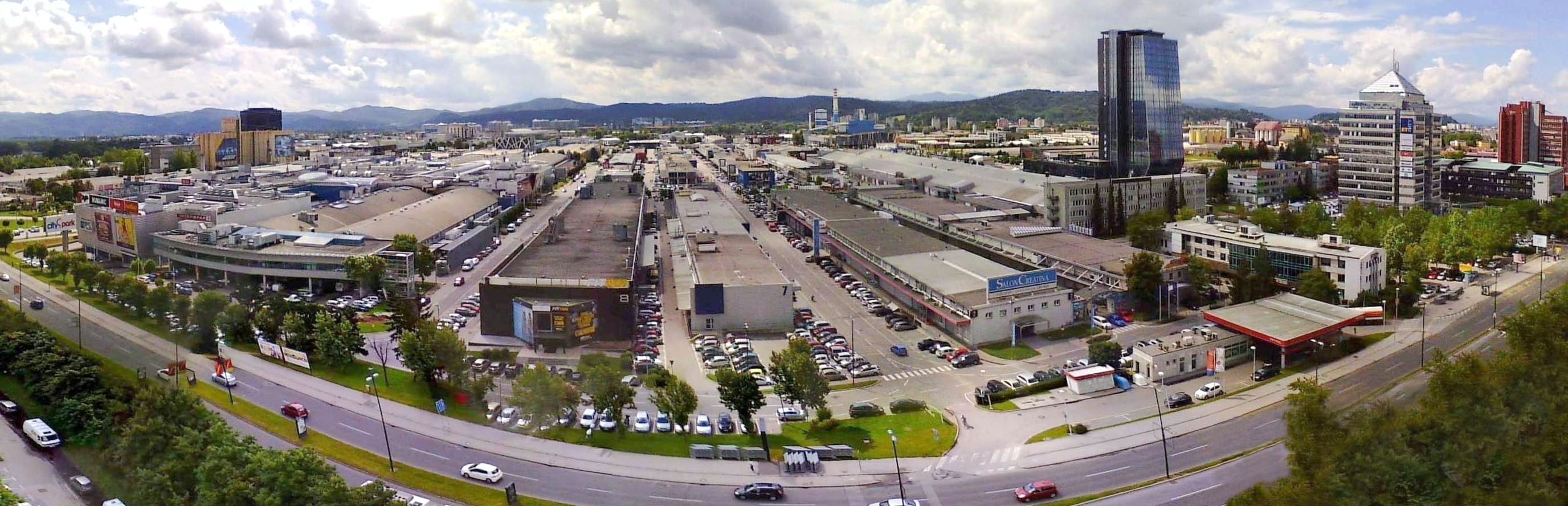
A panoramic image of BTC City from the north.

=== CityPark ===
It is the main shopping mall with more than 150 shops and 15 bars and restaurants. It was built in three phases from 2002 to 2010. Major anchors include: Adidas, H&M, Interspar, K&0, Marks&Spencer, NewYorker.

List of restaurants and shops

Restaurants

- Bangkok Street
- Burger King
- Chinese House
- Imperio Mexicano
- InterSpar Restaurant
- McDonald's
- Pizzeria Al Capone
- Restaurant Pri Oljki

Electronics, telecommunications

- Apple store
- Big Bang
- Comshop
- Sony Centre
- Telekom Slovenija

Cosmetics

- DM Drogerie Markt
- L'Occitane en Provence
- Limoni
- Melvita
- Stenders

Fashion and sport

- 7Camicie
- Accessorize
- Adidas
- Blue Jeans Shop
- Calzedonia
- Comma
- Desigual
- Exclusive
- Fred Perry
- G-Star Raw
- Guess
- H&M
- Hervis Sport
- Intimissimi
- Jack and Jones
- Jack Wolfskin
- Kastner & Öhler Fashion House (Armani Jeans, Calvin Klein, Diesel, Lacoste, etc.)
- Levi's
- Lisca
- Marks & Spencer
- Mura
- Naracamicie
- NewYorker
- Okaidi
- Orsay
- Palmers
- Princess
- Promod
- S.Oliver
- Socks
- Sportina
- Tally Weijl
- Tkanina
- Tom Tailor
- Tomas Sport
- Triumph
- Two Way
- Women's Secret
- XYZ Premium Fashion Store
- Zero

Fashion accessories, jewellery and watches

- Kleo Bijoux
- Six
- Sten Time
- Swarovski
- Swatch
- Jewlerry Celje, Jewlerry Sterle

Shoes and bags

- After Leonardo
- Bags & More
- Bata Shoes
- Camper
- Deichmann
- Humanic
- Mass
- Toko
- Transport Footwear

=== Kolosej ===
It is a multiplex that was opened in 2001. It has got twelve screens with capacity of viewers from 140 to 600. Inside of the multiplex there is also an entertainment section with billiards and other games, two restaurants and McDonald's, three bars, a bookshop and two fashion shops. Kolosej closed in March 2023.
