= Crystal Palace (Ljubljana) =

Coordinates: 46°4′0.93″N 14°32′28.74″E

- Interactive map of the Crystal Palace area

General information
- Type: Multi-use
- Location: Šmartinska cesta 152; Ljubljana, Slovenia
- Construction started: May 15, 2009
- Completed: 2011
- Opening: May 2011
- Owner: Skai center (BTC d.d. 60%, Nuba d.o.o. 40%)

Height
- Roof: 89 m (292 ft)

Technical details
- Floor count: 20
- Floor area: 46,000 m^{2} (495,140 sq ft)

Design and construction
- Architects: Brane Smole & Denis Simčič (Atelje S)
- Main contractor: Grosuplje d.d.

The Crystal Palace (Slovene: Kristalna palača) is a skyscraper in Ljubljana, Slovenia, situated within the BTC City shopping centre in Nove Jarše district in the northwestern part of the city. Standing 89 metres (290 ft) and 20 storeys tall, it is currently the tallest building in Slovenia.

The building houses high end stores, a wellness centre, business offices, and a congress hall.

== Construction ==
Construction began with laying of the foundation stone on May 15, 2009. The building has a distinctive shape, with supporting columns jutting out until the second floor, after which it gradually tapers toward the top. The first part proved the most challenging during construction: it took almost a year to finish it, after which the building grew one storey each 8 days and reached the final height in September 2010.

Plans for the Crystal Palace were made by Slovene architects Brane Smole and Denis Simčič. The 54 million Euro investment is covered by companies BTC d.d. and Nuba d.o.o and managed by the company Skai center established by the two parent companies for this purpose. Originally, the building was planned to be over 100 metres (330 ft) tall. The owners still intend to build a helipad on the roof which was not a part of the finished building due to difficulties with Slovene air traffic regulations.

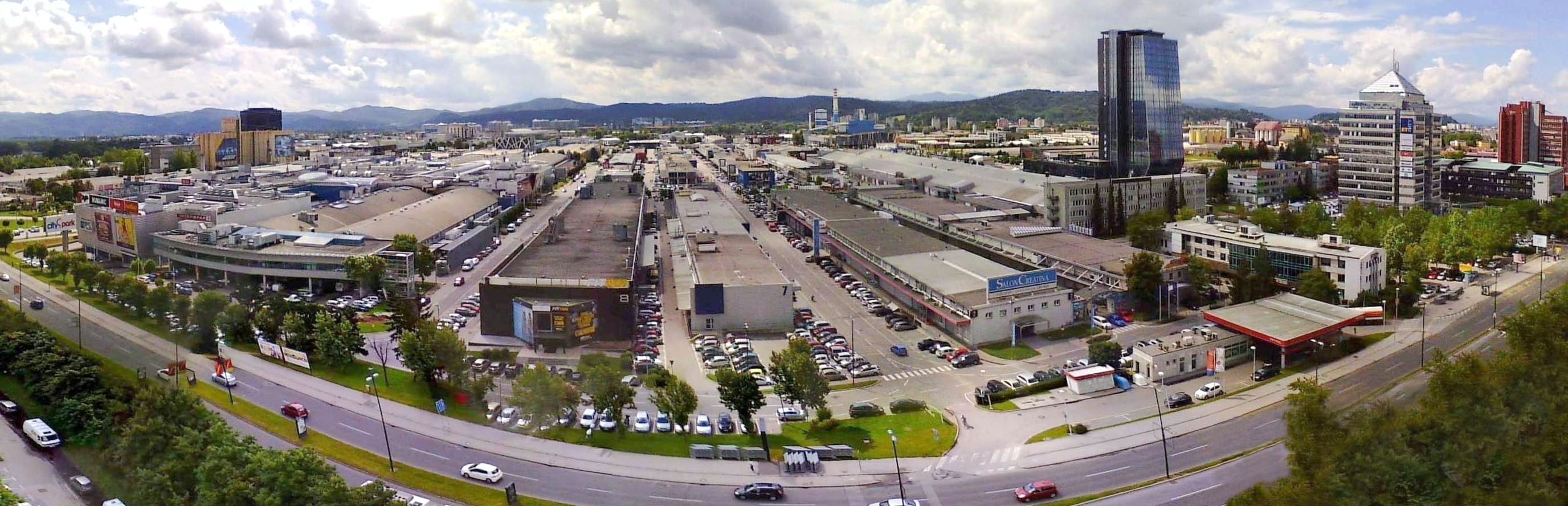
The Crystal Palace is visible on the right of a panoramic image of BTC City.
