= Leto (surname) =

Leto is a surname. Notable people with the surname include:

- Antonio Leto (1844–1913), Italian painter
- Jared Leto (born 1971), actor and singer of band Thirty Seconds to Mars
- Julie Elizabeth Leto (born 1965), American writer of romance novels
- Julius Pomponius Laetus or Pomponius Leto (1425–1498), Italian humanist
- Marco Leto (1931–2016), Italian film and television director and screenwriter
- Norman Leto (born 1980), Polish artist
- Peter Leto, American television director and television producer
- Sebastián Leto (born 1986), Argentinian footballer
- Shannon Leto (born 1970), American drummer of band Thirty Seconds to Mars
