= Ledo (name) =

Ledo is a given name and a surname. It may refer to:

- Ledo Arroyo Torres (1894–1975), Uruguayan politician
- Japhet Ledo, former Moderator of the General Assembly of the Evangelical Presbyterian Church, Ghana (1993-2001)
- Joaquim Gonçalves Ledo (1781-1847), Brazilian journalist and politician
- Libia García Muñoz Ledo (born 1983), Mexican lawyer and politician
- Miguel Ledo (1990–2024), Spanish footballer
- Porfirio Muñoz Ledo (1933–2023), Mexican politician
- Ricky Ledo (born 1992), American professional basketball player

== See also ==
- Lêdo Ivo (1924-2012), Brazilian poet, novelist, essayist and journalist
