= Lido Tikok =

- city
- Location in Assam, India Lido Tikok (India)
- Coordinates: 27.5000°N 95.3667°E
- Country: India
- State: Assam
- District: Tinsukia

Population (2001)
  - Total: 6,761

Languages
  - Official: Assamese
- Time zone: UTC+5:30 (IST)
- Vehicle registration: AS

Lido Tikok is a census town in Tinsukia district in the Indian state of Assam.

== Demographics ==
As of 2001 India census, Lido Tikok had a population of 6,761. Males constitute 54% of the population and females 46%. Lido Tikok has an average literacy rate of 66%, higher than the national average of 59.5%: male literacy is 74%, and female literacy is 57%. In Lido Tikok, 12% of the population is under 6 years of age.
