= Leder und Schuh =

European shoe company

Leder und Schuh AG
- Type: corporation
- Industry: Retail sale of footwear and leather goods in specialised stores consumer products distribution manufacture of footwear manufacture of leather and related products
- Founded: 1872
- Headquarters: Graz, Austria,
- Products: Shoes, Apparel, Accessories
- Revenue: 374 Mio. EUR
- Number of employees: about 2,321
- Website: www.lsag.com

Leder & Schuh, one of the largest shoe companies in Europe, employs over 2,321 people in about 206 locations and gains total revenue of 374 million Euros. (2017)

The corporation is not listed on the stock exchange. According to its account Leder & Schuh is the market leader in Austria and Slovenia and number two in Hungary and Slovakia.

The main business areas are Humanic and Shoe 4 You. The Executive Board consists of Mag. Werner Weber and Thomas Weber.(2016)

== History ==
=== 1872 ===
The history of Humanic begins with a shoe factory. In 1872 "D.H. Pollak & Co" settles in Graz and lays the foundation for today's holding company "Leder & Schuh International AG" with its headquarters still at the same premises. Soon "D.H. Pollak & Co" manages numerous factories and stores and produces 20,000 pairs per week, thus becoming the biggest producer of shoes in Central Europe. The company opens stores in Prague, Budapest, Zagreb, Ljubljana, Trieste, Meran, and Timișoara and even exports its shoes to Africa, America, Australia and India. “D.H. Pollak & Co” are global players, which also manifests itself in the new name: "Goodyear Welt-Schuhfabrik — D.H. Pollak & Co" (“Goodyear World Shoe Factory — D.H. Pollak & Co”).

=== 1904 ===
In 1904, shoe production and trade are further expanded, and stores are set up as far afield as Constantinople (Istanbul), Plovdiv, Sofia and Berlin. Due to the take-over of the American company "Humanic", the company changes its name again: In 1907, the “American Shoe House Humanic" opens its first two stores in Vienna, on Kärntnerring 6, opposite the famous Hotel Bristol, and in Mariahilferstraße 92, opposite Hotel Palace.

=== 1914-1918 ===
Due to World War I, the company loses almost its entire branch network, consisting of more than 100 branches. Despite the tense economic situation, several shoe factories are acquired, amongst others the "Allgemeine Österreichische Schuh-Aktien-Gesellschaft".

=== 1920 ===
Serious damages caused by World War I require a new start for the company. Meeting a similar fate as the Austro-Hungarian-Empire the organisation is broken up into several independent distribution and manufacturing companies. These companies, in turn, get lost in the economic and political post-war confusion. By founding the Austrian "Humanic Leder und Schuh AG, Vienna-Graz" a strong sign of life is sent out once again and all efforts are concentrated on a restart in a now "shrunk" Austria.

The company takes off quickly and in 1930 the Humanic sales network already encompasses 60 branches again.

=== 1938-1945 ===
The consequences of the worldwide economic crisis and incorporation of Austria into Greater Germany imply dramatic difficulties and the end of expansion for the company. Finally World War II causes the total collapse. Due to its location near the central station of Graz, the factory is almost completely destroyed by 15th AF / 55th BW air strikes on 15 March 1945.

=== 1950 ===
The reconstruction after World War II is concentrated on the relatively small Austrian market and is finished by 1950. International cooperation with renowned companies like "Calzaturificio di Varese" or "Charles Jourdan" is launched accompanied by the reorganisation of Europe. This is when the foundation for the fashion leadership of Humanic is laid.

=== 1960-1970 ===
The foundation of the European Free Trade Association EFTA is the starting point for more intensive trade connections with Scandinavia and Switzerland; exports to Germany, Norway, the Benelux countries, the Far East, and the USSR bring continuous growth. Thus, more than 3,000 shoe stores throughout Europe are supplied with goods from the company-owned production and wholesale business. At the same time, new production sites are opened in Austria (Deutschlandsberg, Radkersburg, Eibiswald, and Feldbach) and other European countries, such as Switzerland and Spain.

=== 1977-1990 ===
Up until 1977, all trading activities are exclusively carried out under the brand name Humanic. From then on, however, the company starts to diversify its trading activities. 1977 First Top Schuh stores are opened. In 1988 the first Dominici store opened (designer labels). In 1989 Jello Schuhpark is founded (price aggressive concept for retail parks).

In 1990 Leder & Schuh AG—as we know it today— was founded. As a holding company, it takes over leadership and service functions as well as coordination of all activities at home and abroad.

=== 1991-2000 ===
By acquiring the majority interest of the Hungarian commercial company SZIVÁRVÁNY Rt. with its headquarters in Budapest, Leder & Schuh AG continues the internationalisation that was started in 1904. Finally, Humanic and its shoe stores manage to take over market leadership in Hungary.

In 1992, Humanic enters the Czech Republic with the opening of a store in Brno.

1994 marks the birth of Shoe 4 You. The first store is opened in Germany, it also marks our debut on this neighbouring market. In the same year, Leder & Schuh International AG withdraws from shoe production and wholesale activities, thus making an important decision regarding the reorientation of the company towards retail business.

In 2000, the company moves on to Slovenia, where it opens Jello and Humanic stores.

=== 2001-2007 ===
Leder & Schuh International AG is able to strengthen its leading market position in Austria and increases its international expansion.

In spring 2002, Humanic opens its first store in Regensburg, Germany, and, in the same year, the first two stores in Bratislava, Slovakia. In 2005 Humanic enters the Polish market. At the end of 2007 the strategic decision is taken to withdraw Top Schuh from the market.

=== Now ===
By opening the first stores in spring 2008, Humanic enters the market in Romania and Switzerland. In 2009 the first Humanic store launches in Croatia.

== Literature ==
- Franz Mathis: Big Business in Österreich. Österreichische Großunternehmen in Kurzdarstellungen. Oldenbourg Wissenschaftsverlag, 1987, S. 156 ff.; ISBN 978-3-486-53771-0.

adnan radoncic
