= Leto Atreides =

Leto Atreides is the name of three characters in the fictional Dune universe created by Frank Herbert:

- Leto I Atreides, father of Paul "Muad'Dib" Atreides
- Leto II Atreides the Elder, first son of Paul Atreides and Chani; killed in his infancy
- Leto II Atreides (God Emperor of Dune), son of Paul Atreides and Chani and twin to Ghanima
