= Konzum =

Croatian supermarket chain

- Type: Subsidiary
- Traded as: ZSE: KNZM (delisted)
- Industry: Retail
- Founded: Zagreb, SR Croatia, Yugoslavia, 1957; 69 years ago
- Headquarters: Zagreb, Croatia
- Key people: Zoran Mitreski (CEO)
- Products: Grocery, general merchandise
- Revenue: 1,876,000,000 (2023)
- Net income: 18,000,000 (2023)
- Number of employees: >10,000 (2019)
- Parent: Fortenova Group
- Website: www.konzum.hr

Konzum is Croatia's largest supermarket chain, with over 700 stores throughout the country and more than 10,000 employees. Konzum serves over 650,000 customers each day. With its headquarters in Zagreb, Konzum is part of the Fortenova Group since 1 April 2019.

There are Konzum stores in Bosnia and Herzegovina, Serbia and Montenegro as well. In July 2005 Konzum founded a chain of drugstores, known as Kozmo. This chain, which by then had 42 stores with 242 employees, was sold to the Nexus ALPHA fund on 31 December 2009. In 2017 German retailer Müller undertook all 70 Kozmo stores expanding its presence in Croatian drugstore market.

== History ==
The first Konzum store was opened in Zagreb in 1957, which was first self-service retail store in Zagreb. Unikonzum was established in 1970 by joining four retail chain stores: Črnomerec, Konzum, Moslavka and Slavonia. Konzum's business has been steadily growing and greatly expanded after Croatia broke off from former Yugoslavia in the early 1990s. Since then it has expanded into Croatia's biggest supermarket chain. It joined the Agrokor group in 1994.

In 1995 the name Unikonzum was changed back to Konzum and restructured its operations according to the project by the consultant and introduced their EPoS application.

In 2002 Konzum completed the acquisition of Alastor, the third largest food retailer in Croatia. In the same year Konzum started its loyalty card program and first retail online shop in Croatia.

The expansion continued in 2003 with the opening of 70 new branches and an increase in the number of employees from 5,000 to 7,000. Since 2005 there are Konzum sales outlets in all parts of Croatia. In 2006, the company opened its largest branch to date, called Super Konzum Tower Centar in Rijeka. Another nine Super Konzum stores followed in 2009, after 67 new Konzum stores were opened in 2007. From 2011, Konzum built another logistics and distribution center in Dugopolje with an area of 85,000 m^{2}, which it says is the largest in the region.

Konzum Benz, a chain of petrol stations was opened in 2012 and in the same year Konzum launched their own mobile application. In 2019 Konzum operations and assets were moved to a new company, Konzum plus d.o.o., owned by Fortenova Group, eliminating ties between Konzum and Agrokor group. In 2021 Konzum was the first retail chain in Croatia to implement cryptocurrency payment (through Electrocoin, Croatian crypto payment processor) on their webshop and in physical stores.

== K Plus ==
K Plus is the value product brand of Konzum. Food and household products are sold at affordable prices under the brand.

== Stores ==
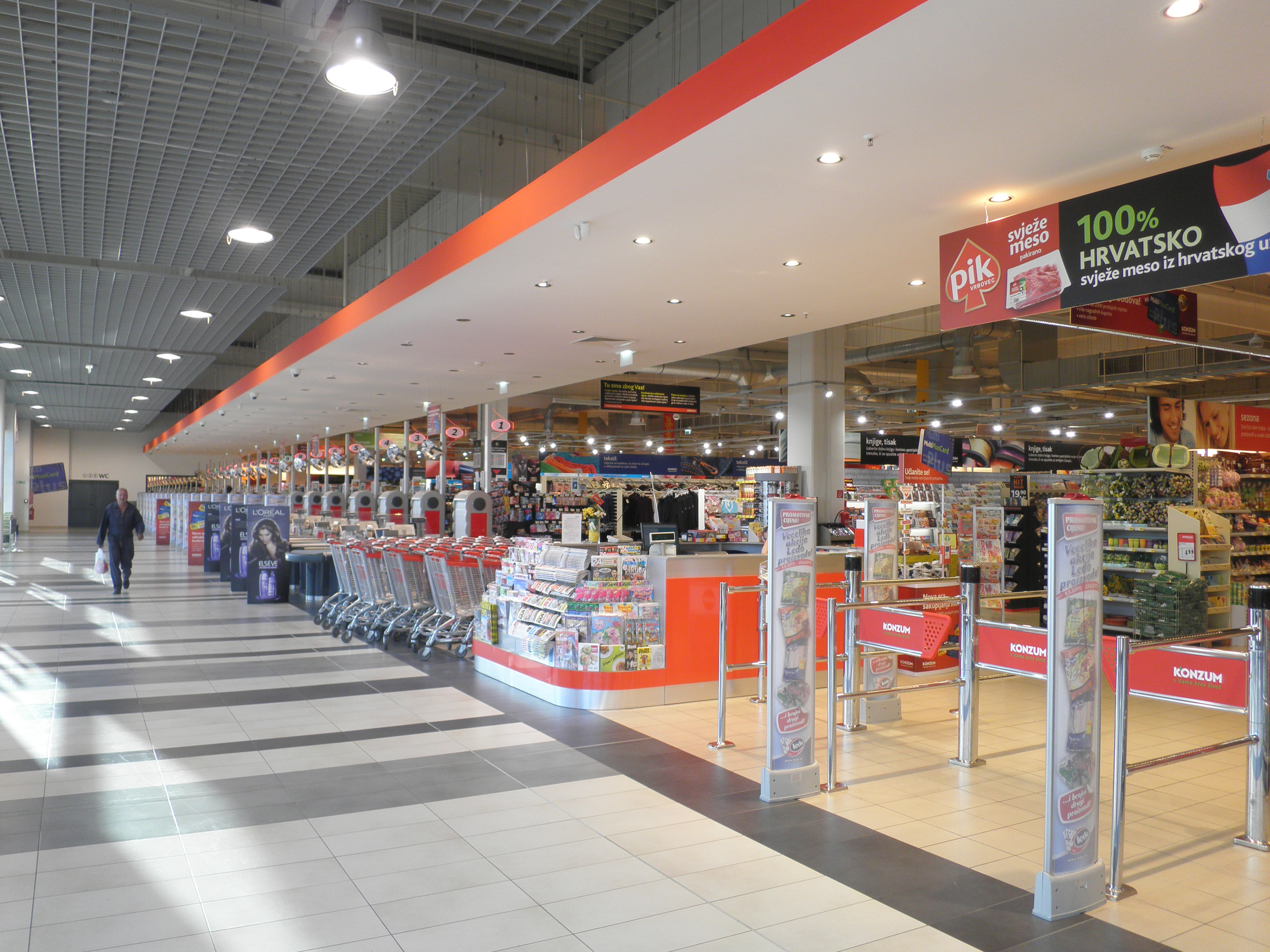
Interior of a large Konzum store in Split

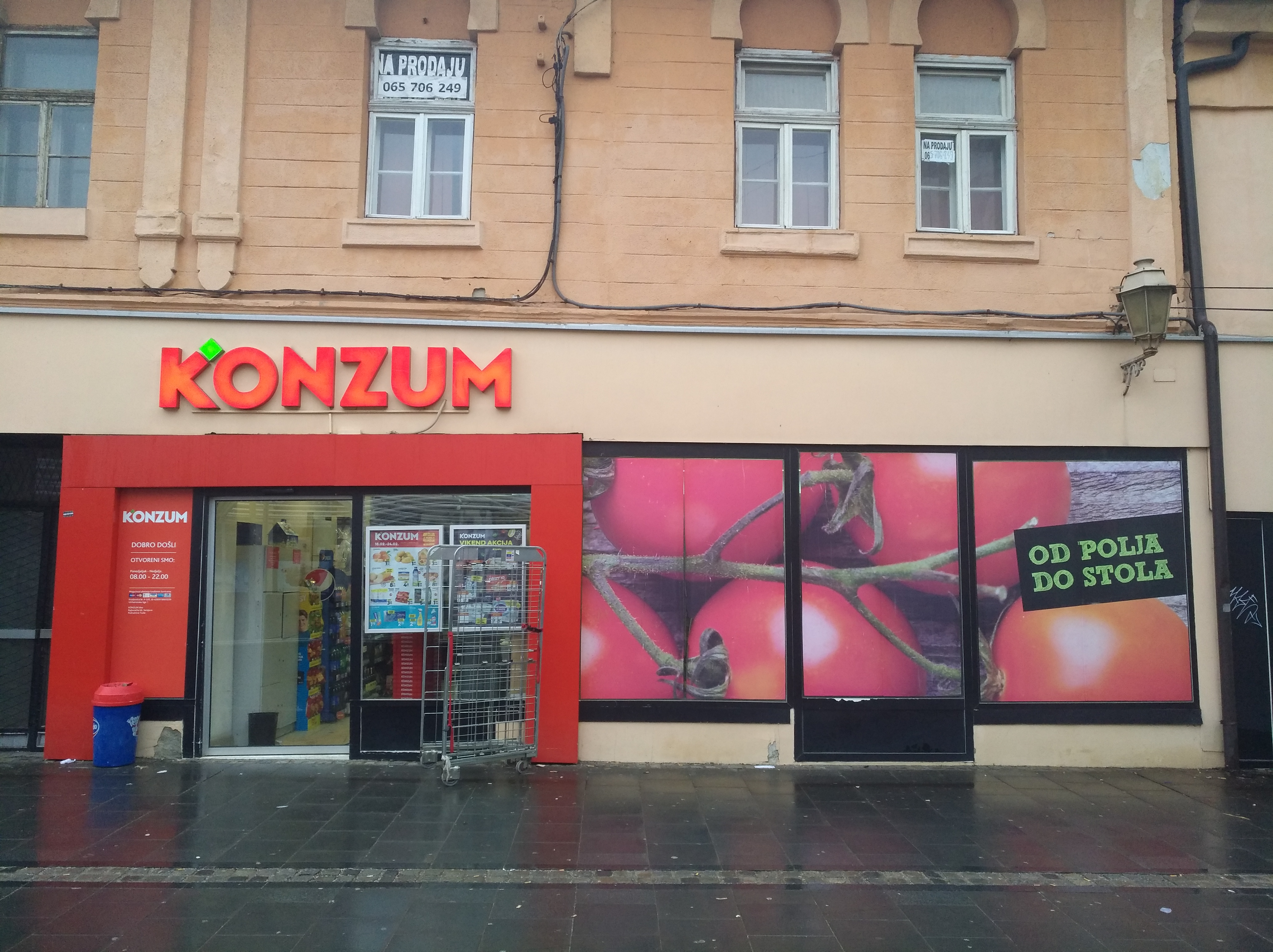
Konzum supermarket in Tuzla.

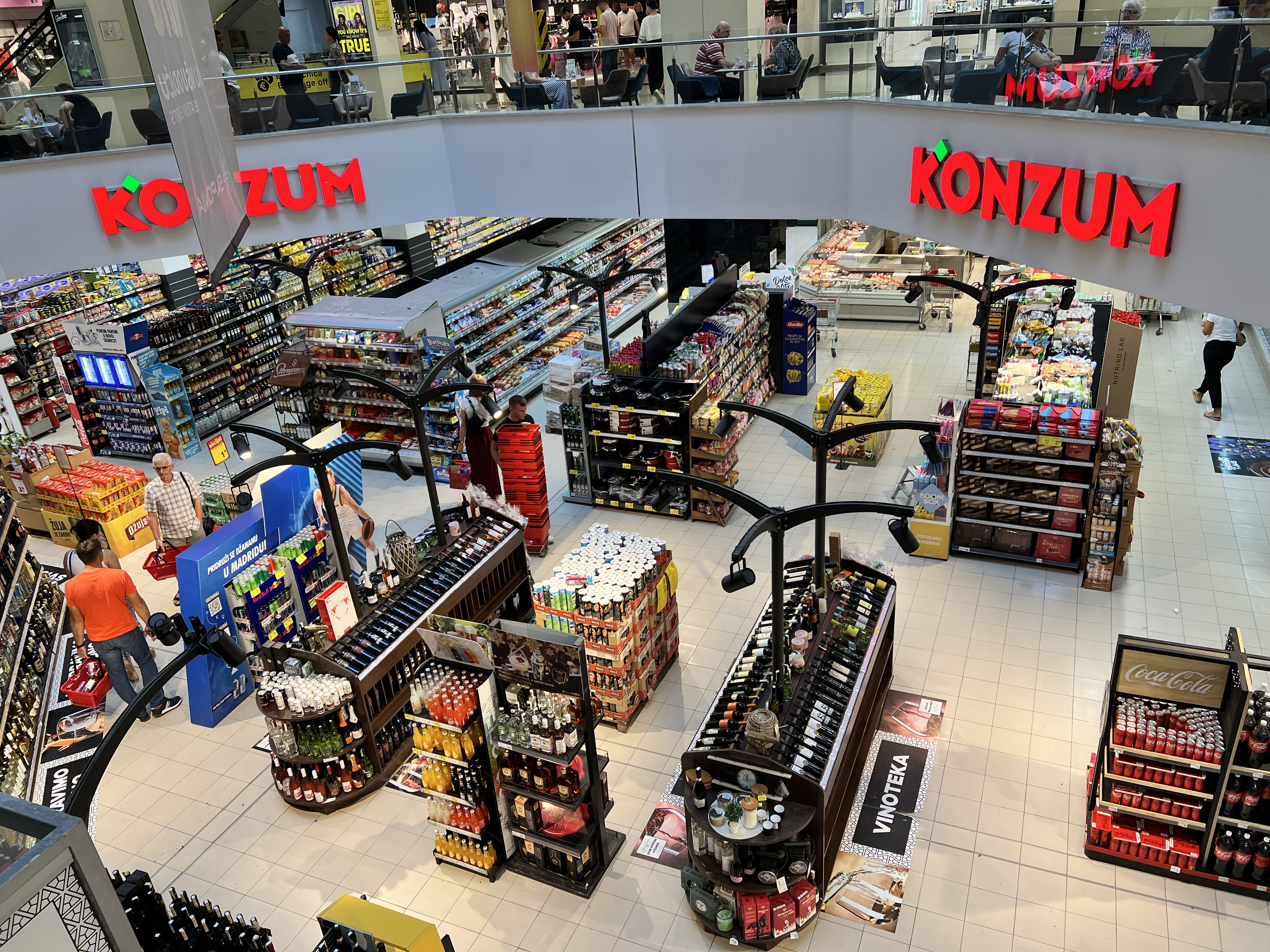
Konzum supermarket in Mepas Mall in Mostar.

Konzum stores are named Konzum, Konzum Maxi, or Super Konzum according to their sizes.

=== Konzum Maxi ===
Konzum Maxi is the medium-sized version of Konzum supermarket. They are located in Dubrovnik, Sisak, Ploče, Vis, Makarska, Split, Sinj, Šibenik Knin, Vodice, Zadar, Gospić, Otočac, Crikvenica, Krk, Pula, Rovinj, Umag, Poreč, Rijeka, Jastrebarsko, Zagreb, Varaždin, Čakovec, Bjelovar, Đakovo, Slavonski Brod, Osijek, Vinkovci and Pirovac.

=== Super Konzum ===
Super Konzum is the largest version of the Konzum supermarket range. They are located in Imotski, Čakovec, Đakovo, Vinkovci, Varaždin, Slavonski Brod, Zagreb, Samobor, Jastrebarsko, Ogulin, Rijeka, Poreč, Mali Lošinj, Zadar, Šibenik, Split, Kutina, Makarska, Delnice and Dubrovnik.

=== Velpro ===
Velpro is a Bosnian cash and carry, Velpro is a part of the Konzum group. The first Velpro was opened in 2003 in Bosnia and Herzegovina. Velpro cash & carry has about 14 stores in Croatia also in Belgrade, Serbia.

=== Idea ===
Konzum operates in Serbia and Montenegro under the "Idea" brand. Idea stores are named Idea, Idea Super or Idea Extra according to their sizes. The city of Niš has the largest number of Idea stores at 37, followed by Belgrade with 24 and Podgorica with 19. Other Idea supermarkets are located in Novi Sad, Kruševac, Leskovac, Subotica, Vrbas, Bor, Sombor, Smederevo, Užice, Kraljevo, Valjevo, Gornji Milanovac, Šabac, Kragujevac, Zrenjanin, Nikšić, Herceg Novi, Pančevo and other towns.

=== LDC ===
LDC (short for Logističko-Distribucijski Centar – meaning Logistic-Distribution Center) is Konzum's storage company partner. Their warehouses are located in Zagreb, Split and Osijek.
