= Zlatarna Celje =

Slovenian jeweler and goldsmith

- Company type: Public limited company
- Industry: Goldsmith's trade
- Founded: 1947
- Headquarters: Celje, Slovenia
- Number of locations: 100 stores
- Area served: World
- Products: Jewellery
- Revenue: ▼EU€ 51.444.534 (2011)
- Net income: ▼EU€ -1.624.704 (2011)
- Owner: Albreht family
- Number of employees: 251
- Subsidiaries: Aurodent
- Website: www.zlatarna-celje.com

Zlatarna Celje, PLC, is a Slovenian jeweler and goldsmith located in Celje. About 70% of its business is from the sale of jewelry and gold bullion, and the company also manufactures dental alloys and industrial gold. Zlatarna Celje's retail stores are mainly located in Slovenia and the countries of the former Yugoslavia. Today, the company markets its products under the Zlatarna Celje and Lencia brand names, the latter of which has developed a collection line with Tina Maze, a Slovenian skier. It has also invested in the construction of the Plaza hotel BTC City (Ljubljana).

== History ==
Giuseppe (Johanna) Pacchiaf, an Italian goldsmith, opened a 100-employee workshop in Gaberje, Celje in 1921 with two brothers, Alojz and Ivan Knez. Following the World War II, the new government confiscated half the company's shares from the Pacchiaf's heir. Not long after, the government nationalized the shares of Ivan Knez as well. In 1963 the company was under the management of Municipal People Committee's (MLO) Celje and continued to operate as a craft enterprise, only to be transformed into the Zlatarna Celje industrial company. Over time the company became one of the most important companies in this sector and in this part of Europe; exporting products to Europe, North America, Australia and Asia. In 1974 the company reached a million dollars of annual exports.

After the independence of Slovenia, Zlatarna Celje was in financial distress, mostly due to the loss of Yugoslav markets, but also because of inefficiency and poor marketing. In 1997 the company was bankrupt, but before it had to shut down the business, it was rescued by Aurodent, a subsidiary. In 1999, it was taken over by the Albreht family through the AL Company, which provided capital for the brand's successful relaunch. Bojan Albreht owns a 55% controlling interest in the corporation and is the chairman of the board.

Following the company's business review in 2011, the World Gold Council association added Zlatarna Celje to its list of trustworthy gold traders. It has partnered with Tina Maze, a Slovenian skier, on the Lencia jewelry collection since about 2008 and about 2012, Zlatarna Celje invested in the construction of the Plaza hotel BTC City (Ljubljana), which has been its biggest venture.
