= Müller (store) =

German multinational retail store chain

Müller Holding GmbH & Co. KG

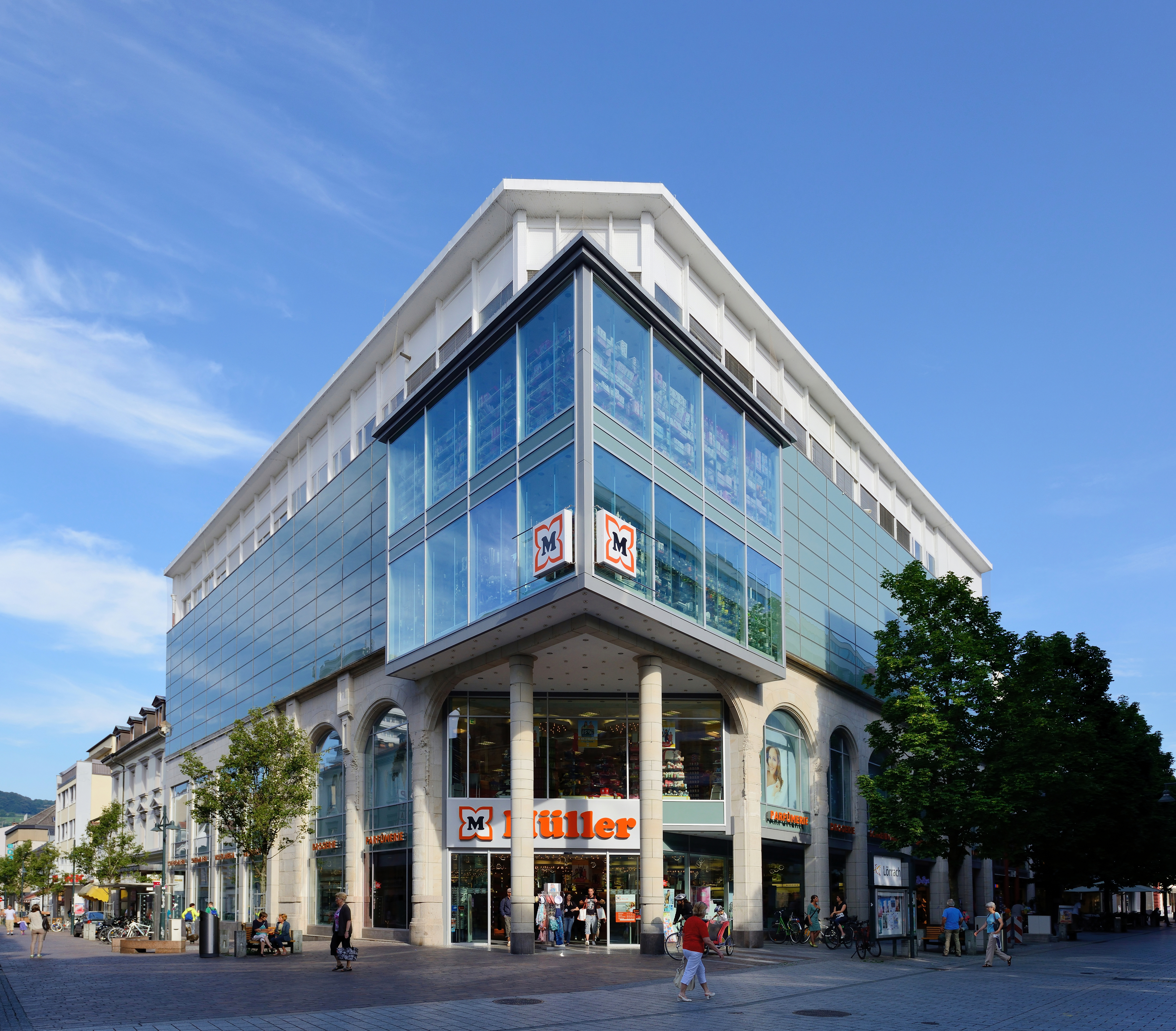
- Type: Limited, KG
- Industry: Retail
- Founded: March 5, 1953
- Headquarters: Ulm, Germany
- Number of locations: 908
- Area served: Germany, Austria, Switzerland, Croatia, Hungary, Slovenia, Spain, Liechtenstein, Slovakia
- Key people: Erwin Franz Müller; Elke Menold
- Revenue: €4.01 billion (2020)
- Number of employees: 35,500 (2024)
- Website: www.mueller.de

Müller Ltd. & Co. KG (Müller) is a German chain retail stores with headquarters in Ulm, Germany. Between 2004 and 2019 the company was registered in London. Since 2019 it has been registered in Vaduz, Liechtenstein.

== History ==
The hairdresser Erwin Franz Müller founded his company in Ulm on 5 March 1953. By 1968 the company had opened additional outlets in Munich and Karlsruhe. In 1976 the construction of a corporate headquarters began in Ulm-Jungingen. In 1978 annual revenue crossed 100 million D-Mark for the first time. From 1980 to 1985 the company opened 59 new outlets, was converted into the Müller GmbH & Co. KG in 1985 and then opened another 86 outlets by 1990. Since then the company has expanded in Europe.

Müller currently has about 35,500 employees. In 2010 the company earned revenues of €2.42 billion. Erwin Müller and Elke Menold are General Managers of the company.

In 2004, the company was transformed into a Limited & Co. KG (a hybrid of the English cognate of the German GmbH and the German word "Compagnie Kommanditgesellschaft", meaning "limited partnership") when the company registered under English law in London.

== Müller in Europe ==
By 2025 Müller had a total of 970 outlets in 9 European countries:

Country	No. of stores
Slovakia	2
Austria	108
Croatia	95
Germany	582
Hungary	34
Liechtenstein	1
Slovenia	26
Spain	18
Switzerland	97

== Products ==
Müller is primarily a cosmetics store with large drugstore (approx. 50,000 items) and perfumery (approx. 28,000 items) section, but apart from beauty care products it also sells commodities and fashion accessories, health food and dietary supplements, as well as some over-the-counter drugs, household products, toys, multi-media (i.e. movies on DVD as well as music CDs and vinyl records), stationery and books. Its portfolio consists of approx. 188,000 products total.

Unlike competing chains, such as dm-drogerie markt, Müller mostly sells products directly from the German domestic market (in a manner similar to parallel importing) in all countries where it operates. Because of this, many Croats go to Müller to shop for cosmetics, detergents and most-famously, Nutella as the one offered in other retail stores is of lower quality.

== See also ==
- dm-drogerie markt
- Rossmann
- Douglas
