= Lido Theatre (disambiguation) =

Lido Theatre usually refers to Le Lido, a cabaret and burlesque dance show establishment on the Champs-Élysées in Paris, France.

Lido Theatre or Lido Theater may also refer to:

- Lido Theatre (Canada), atmospheric theatre in The Pas, Manitoba
- Lido Theater (Medellín), a Colombian theater in Medellín
- Lido Theater (Newport Beach), a movie theater in Newport Beach, California
