= Ledo (company) =

Croatian ice cream and frozen food company

Ledo d.d.
- Company type: Public
- Traded as: ZSE: LEDO (until 2018)
- Industry: Foods
- Founded: 1958
- Headquarters: Zagreb, Croatia
- Products: Ice cream, Frozen food
- Revenue: HRK 2.3 billion (c. €310 million) (2015)
- Net income: HRK 267 million (c. €36 million) (2015)
- Total assets: HRK 2.6 billion (c. €350 million) (2015)
- Website: ledo.hr

Ledo d.d. is a Croatian-based producer of ice cream and frozen food headquartered in Zagreb.

Ledo's total revenues in 2008 amounted to HRK 1.19 billion and increased by 16.7 percent compared to last year. The bulk of the income is made up of sales income in the country, which increased by 13.2 percent, and by 28.3 percent, the growth of income abroad is recorded. The realized net profit is HRK 89.4 million, which is an increase of 28.8 percent compared to the previous year.

In 2013, at the conference of the International Association of Manufacturers of Ice Cream and Frozen Foods, Ledo Torta ice cream was recognized as the best in the world.

It was partially owned by the Agrokor group, which restructured and rebranded as Fortenova Group in 2018. Ledo is one of the largest producers of frozen food and ice cream in Southeastern Europe. Apart from Croatia, it is also produced and sold in Bosnia and Herzegovina, Slovenia, Albania, Montenegro and Hungary.Beginning of 2021, Fortenova announced it was entering exclusive negotiations with the UK-headquartered Nomad Foods about the sale of its frozen food arm which comprised Ledo plus d.o.o. (Croatia), Ledo Čitluk (Bosnia and Herzegovina) and Frikom (Serbia). In January 2021 Croatian business press reported that the purchase price would likely exceed EUR 600 million. On March 29 2021 Fortenova Group announced that the transaction was closed at EUR 615 million and would be finalized in Q3 2021.

The first ice cream produced in Croatia, the popular Snjeguljica (Snow White), was introduced in 1958. At the time, what was to become Ledo was a part of a larger Croatian milk producer.

== See also ==
- List of companies of the Socialist Federal Republic of Yugoslavia
