= Humanic =

Austrian shoe store chain

HUMANIC
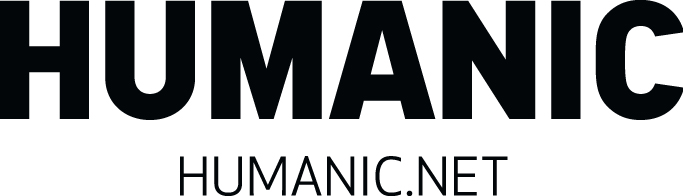
- Logo used since 2013.
- Type: GmbH
- Headquarters: Graz, Austria
- Products: Shoes, Apparel, Accessories
- Website: www.shoemanic.com

Humanic (stylized in caps HUMANIC) is a subsidiary of Leder und Schuh with its headquarters in Graz. In 1907, the American Shoe House HUMANIC opened its first two stores in Vienna, on Kärntnerring 6, opposite the famous Hotel Bristol, and in Mariahilferstraße 92, opposite Hotel Palace.

Today HUMANIC is trading in shoes and accessories and appears on the market in eleven European countries. Since March 2009 Austrian and German customers can also shop online.

== History ==
The brand HUMANIC and the company has been around since 1872. By acquiring the majority interest of the Hungarian commercial company SZIVÁRVÁNY Rt. with its headquarters in Budapest, HUMANIC started the internationalisation. Finally, HUMANIC and its shoe stores managed to take over market leadership in Hungary.

In 1992, HUMANIC entered the Czech Republic with the opening of a store in Brno. In 2000 the company moved on to Slovenia. Two years later HUMANIC opened its first store in Regensburg, Germany, and, in the same year, the first two stores in Bratislava, Slovakia. In 2005 HUMANIC entered the Polish market. By opening the first stores in spring 2008 Humanic entered the market in Romania and Switzerland. In 2009 the first Humanic store launches in Croatia.

In April 2019, HUMANIC opened their 5th store in Bulgaria, which was in the city of Plovdiv. Their other stores are in Sofia, Varna and Burgas.

In September 2021, the company introduced a new symbol for its brand. It is symbolized by five letters: FRANZ = Fashion, Revolution, Attitude, Number One, Zeitgeist (fashion, revolution, approach, number one, spirit of the time) and a foot and hand icon in one, which has been introduced as a mascot way before.
