= Fortenova Group =

Conglomerate company

- Official logo
- Native name: Fortenova Grupa
- Type: Joint-stock company
- Industry: Food and Retail
- Predecessor: Agrokor
- Founded: 1 April 2019; 7 years ago
- Headquarters: Zagreb, Croatia
- Area served: Southeast and Central Europe
- Key people: Fabris Peruško (CEO); Pavao Vujnovac (chairman of the board of directors)
- Revenue: ▲€5.4 billion (2021)
- Net income: ▼€4 million) (2022)
- Total assets: ▲€4.6 billion (2022)
- Total equity: ▼€130 million (2022)
- Owner: Open Pass (93,78%), more than 80 minority equity holders
- Number of employees: 45,237 (2022)
- Subsidiaries: 159
- Website: fortenova.hr

Fortenova Group (Croatian: Fortenova Grupa) is a food producer and retailer headquartered in Zagreb, Croatia. It began operations on 1 April 2019. The company was formed through the implementation of the Settlement Plan agreed upon by the creditors of Agrokor. Agrokor, due to financial insolvency and excessive debt, had entered pre-bankruptcy proceedings managed under the Extraordinary Administration Procedure in accordance with the Act on Extraordinary Administration Procedures in Companies of Systemic Importance to the Republic of Croatia.

Fortenova Group employs over 50,000 workers across its administrative headquarters, production plants, sales locations and distribution centers. The group also participates in its own business operations such as food production, retail chain management, and agriculture on the markets of Croatia, Slovenia, Bosnia and Herzegovina, Serbia, and Montenegro, with business interests in Hungary. Fortenova Group is present in the markets of more than 20 countries, and has a retail network of over 2,500 stores in the SEE region.

Fortenova Group is most active in retail, beverage production, edible oil, fresh and processed meat production. Fortenova Group places over 4,000 products.

Fortenova grupa d.d. has announced on 9 July 2024 that its Dutch top holding company, Fortenova Group TopCo B.V., has successfully completed the transformation of its ownership structure. This was achieved by closing the pending sale of Fortenova Group MidCo B.V. (which holds Fortenova grupa d.d. and all Fortenova grupa operating companies) to Iter BidCo B.V., composed of non-sanctioned equity holders of TopCo. Consequently, Fortenova Group no longer has any sanctioned or Russian or Belarusian equity holders. Upon completion and following a subscription process in which all non-sanctioned and non-Russian or Belarusian persons were entitled to participate in Iter BidCo B.V. on the same terms as Open Pass, Open Pass has become the majority equity holder with a 93.78% stake in Iter BidCo B.V. Over 80 minority equity holders have decided to participate in the new ownership structure and together hold a 6.22% stake.

== History ==
=== Agrokor insolvency ===
On 10 April 2017, to prevent the collapse of the Agrokor system due to illiquidity and over-indebtedness as well as the consequences on the economies of Croatia and other countries in Southeast Europe, the Extraordinary Administration Procedure was activated pursuant to the Act on Extraordinary Administration Procedures in Companies of Systemic Importance for the Republic of Croatia.

The Commercial Court of Zagreb sanctioned the creditors' Settlement Plan on 6 July 2018. On 18 October 2018, the High Commercial Court passed the decision to make the creditors' Settlement Plan final.

On 9 November 2017, the High Court of England and Wales recognized the Extraordinary Administration Procedure as an insolvency procedure. Switzerland followed suit in February 2018, and on 15 November 2018, the Bankruptcy Court in New York accepted it under Chapter 15 of the US Bankruptcy Code. Additionally, in July 2018, the European Parliament and Council included the Act on Extraordinary Administration Procedures in the list of national laws recognized as insolvency procedures across the European Union.

Fortenova Group started operations on 1 April 2019, taking over assets of indebted conglomerate Agrokor. At the time of establishment, it had a total of 159 subsidiary companies in which 52,000 people are employed. In September 2019, Fortenova Group issued €1.16 billion in four-year bonds to refinance a 2017 loan. The new financing is structured as a €1.2 billion four-year bond. This transaction and the financial restructuring of Agrokor during the course of the Extraordinary Administration Procedure, resulting in a settlement between the creditors and its successful implementation, was assessed in the United States as the most significant international company transaction of its kind worldwide. The team in charge of the process, headed by the Extraordinary Commissioner Fabris Peruško, won the 2019 TMA Turnaround and Transaction Award in the category International Company Transaction of the Year. According to the choice made by readers of the Večernji list, the refinancing of the roll-up loan at Fortenova Group was the commercial event of the year 2019 in Croatia. Thus, Fabris Peruško, Chief Executive Officer of Fortenova Group, received the award presented for the second time in a row, and on that occasion, he pointed out that the nomination itself was an honour for the company.

Over four years of its operations, Fortenova Group has become a financially healthy company that has cut its leverage in half compared to the period when it was founded. The debt-to-adjusted-EBITDA ratio was thus reduced from 7.2 to 3.6 times in late 2022, amounting to only 10 percent of the leverage of the old Agrokor. At the same time, from 2017 to 2022, the company tripled its operating profits from €122 million to over €300 million, while its revenue reached the amount of €5 billion. In late 2020, it has also realized its first acquisition of the Osijek-based dairy plant assets, where it commenced dairy production under the Kravica Kraljica brand on 1 January 2021.

With the transfer of 69.57 percent of shares of Poslovni system Mercator from Agrokor d.d. to Fortenova Group, on 23 April 2021, Mercator became an integral part of Fortenova Group's Retail Division, with Fortenova Group now holding 88.1 percent of Mercator. Fortenova Group completed in September 2021 the sale of its Frozen Food Business Group (FFBG) consisting of Ledo plus d.o.o., Ledo Čitluk d.o.o. and Frikom d.o.o. alongside several smaller affiliated companies to Nomad Foods Limited. The value of the transaction is €615 million.

In October 2021, Fortenova Group, comprising some of the most significant companies in Croatia and the region, such as Konzum, Mercator, Jamnica, Zvijezda, Dijamant, Belje, Tisak, Sarajevski kiseljak etc., joined the UN Global Compact, the world's largest sustainable development and corporate sustainability initiative.

== Mercator ==
On 1 April 2019, Mercator was not transferred to Fortenova Group.

In September 2019, Javna agencija agencija za varstvo konkurence, or Public Competition Agency (of Slovenia) (AVK), passed a non-final ruling imposing a fine of €53.9 million due to failure to file the concentration of the company Costella, acquired by Ivica Todorić, i.e. Agrokor AG from Switzerland, back in 2016. Agrokor lodged an appeal against this decision.

On 16 December 2019, AVK passed the decision to temporarily seize Mercator d.d. shares from Agrokor d.d., allegedly to secure funds for the collection of the fine. The interim measure of seizing the shares of Mercator d.d. was passed pursuant to the Misdemeanour Act, specifically the provisions of that Act that otherwise apply in cases of traffic offences or similar offences discovered in flagranti, committed by foreign natural persons in the Republic of Slovenia. This in fact constituted an expropriation of private property of Agrokor d.d., whereby the Mercator shares were temporarily seized without any court decision and with no valid legal justification.

In June, with its judgment dated 1 June 2020, the court Okrajno sodišče of Ljubljana altered the decision of the Competition Agency of the Republic of Slovenia on the amount of the fine imposed on Agrokor for not having filed the acquisition of the company Costella with the Agency for assessment at a time when Ivica Todorić managed the company and was its owner. The monetary fine of €53.9 million was reduced by the court to €1 million, with the explanation that the failure to file the concentration was not the result of the "intention to bypass the filing of the concentration in order to possibly cause harmful effects on market competition", but was rather the "result of unconscientious negligence of the responsible person Ivica Todorić". The Court has therefore assessed that a monetary fine of one million euros was the "appropriate and equitable sanction for the offence in question".

In July 2020, the Supreme Court of the Republic of Slovenia passes a judgment pursuant to which the Mercator shares temporarily seized in late 2019 by the Public Competition Agency of the Republic of Slovenia, have to be returned to Agrokor without delay. The Supreme Court declared the seizure of shares to be unlawful, arguing that AVK had no legal foundation to issue the ruling on seizing the shares. The request for the protection of lawfulness was filed with the Supreme Court of the Republic of Slovenia by the State Attorney's Office of the Republic of Slovenia, where it had accused Slovenian AVK of having acted unlawfully by seizing the Mercator shares from Agrokor. With its final and non-appealable judgement, the Supreme Court confirmed that statement changed AVK's decision, and stopped the procedure run by AVK against Agrokor, in which the Mercator shares had been seized. The Supreme Court enabled Agrokor to freely dispose of the shares. In September 2020, The European Commission cleared the concentration of Fortenova Group and Mercator.

In April 2021, with the transfer of 69.57 percent of shares of Poslovni system Mercator from Agrokor d.d. to Fortenova Group, on 23 April 2021, Mercator became an integral part of Fortenova Group's Retail Division, with Fortenova Group now holding 88.1 percent of Mercator. In April 2022, Fortenova Group became the sole owner of Mercator.

== Operational transformation in the period (2018–2024) ==
Fortenova Group's operational transformation over four years (2018–2022) is characterized by three parallel processes – credit, ownership, and debt consolidation.

=== Credit consolidation ===
In Fortenova Group's credit consolidation process, the total number of creditors was reduced from the total around 70 of Agrokor's creditors and 55 banks crediting Mercator to two key creditors headed by the US investor HPS Investment Partners.

Until 2022 the financing and refinancing took place in two stages – (the first being) the refinancing of the so-called SPFA loan by a bond issued in 2019 with a maturity of four years. The importance of closing that arrangement lies in the fact that entirely new investors from the international market, who had not taken part in financing the Extraordinary Administration, recognized Fortenova Group's potential and the company has been provided with medium-term stability as well as the prerequisites for its long-term sustainability, growth, and development.

In 2021 Fortennova Group was able to secure the required funds with the same partners and entirely refinance Mercator's €385 million debt, while another refinancing would follow in the third stage of the credit consolidation in 2022.

=== Debt consolidation ===
The leverage reduction was achieved thanks to the divestment of most of the company's non-core assets as well as some properties that were not used in the core business. At the same time the Frozen Food Business Group (Ledo and Frikom) was sold at the price of as much as €615 million. In addition, Fortenova Group's operating profits grew in the period from 2017 to 2022 by around €200 million.

=== Ownership consolidation ===
In the ownership segment the Group was faced with several challenges at its establishment: the structure that arose from the settlement among Agrokor's creditors was characterized by "fragmented" ownership – a large number of co-owners with very small shares, the non-consolidated structure of Mercator and the co-ownership by Russian banks.

Over the course of four years the challenges with regards to ownership were dealt with in parallel. In 2021 Mercator was consolidated and Fortenova Group acquired 100 percent of its ownership, while the number of around 200 owners that had held 66 percent of the Group was brought down to three owners holding around 80 percent of the company. Around 30 percent of Fortenova Group's ownership is consolidated within Open Pass.

=== Co-ownership by Russian banks ===
During the process of Agrokor's restructuring, the debt towards financial institutions that had provided credits to Agrokor until 2017 was swapped into ownership shares. The debt towards Sberbank amounted to €1.1 million, and pursuant to the Settlement Plan, Sberbank became the largest single owner of Fortenova Group with a share of 42.5 percent, and another Russian state-owned bank – VTB – also entered the ownership structure.

At the time of Fortenova Group's establishment, the Russian banks that were its co-owners were under sectoral sanctions, which were significantly extended following the beginning of the Russian invasion of Ukraine. They were therefore not able to exercise their ownership rights in Fortenova Group, including voting at the Shareholders' Meetings, as the rights arising from their co-ownership were suspended, i.e. their voting rights were frozen.

=== Sberbank's accelerated exit from ownership ===
This situation has accelerated Sberbank's exit from Fortenova Group's ownership structure, while slowing the company's operations over the course of 2022, particularly in terms of having to argue that the sanctioned banks did not hold the majority ownership nor control over the company and that Fortenova Group itself has never been, nor has there been any reason for it to be, under sanctions.

Negotiations with potential investors interested in acquiring the share from SBK ART, the company through which Sberbank holds its 42.5 percent stake in Fortenova Group, were the most advanced with the Croatian pension funds. However, this did not result in investment transfer.

=== Placing of SBK ART on sanctions list ===
Given that this transaction was not realized within the deadline set by the sanction measures, Sberbank unilaterally undertook a purported divestment of its ownership share.

The purported acquisition of the company SBK ART, however, proved to be – and Croatia submitted evidence to corroborate that – an attempt to breach the sanctions in force in the European Union and the UK. According to the evidence, behind this transaction there were Croatian citizens with a widely spread business network in Russia, who realized a fictitious transaction for which no money whatsoever has been transferred from the United Arab Emirates.

Hence with its Regulation No. 2022/2475 of 16 December 2022, that forms part of the ninth package of sanctions for legal persons and individuals related to Russia and the Russian aggression on Ukraine, the EU Council has upon proposal of the Republic of Croatia included the company SBK ART, through which Sberbank of Russia holds 42.5 percent ownership shares in Fortenova Group, on the sanctions list. With the acceptance of evidence that "Sberbank has retained effective control over SBK ART notwithstanding the purported transfer of its shares to a businessman in the United Arab Emirates" and with SBK ART now included on the sanctions list, everything related to that company is subject to the Council Regulation concerning restrictive measures in respect of actions undermining or threatening the territorial integrity, sovereignty and independence of Ukraine, and any breach of those sanctions entails criminal liability for any citizens of EU member states and the UK who may have taken part in it.

=== Judicial conformation of SBK ART's sanctions status ===
In the meantime the inability of SBK ART to exercise their ownership rights was confirmed by all judicial instances in the Netherlands, whereby the sanctioned part of the ownership in SBK ART has been finally and completely separated from the other co-owners and the sanctioned persons have been prevented from having any influence on the governance and decision-making of Fortenova Group.

In particular, the Court of Appeals in Amsterdam passed a judgment in December 2022 according to which SBK ART as a sanctioned company had no voting rights whatsoever at the Shareholders' Meetings of Fortenova Group STAK Stitching and was not allowed to participate in the Shareholders', i.e. the Depositary Receipt Holders' Meetings of Fortenova Group. The judgment is based on the construction of the way the sanctions adopted by the European Commission in November 2022 work, according to which the voting rights of sanctioned shareholders are explicitly considered to be an intangible economic resource and have to be frozen, i.e. their exercise has to be prevented. The Dutch Court of Appeal applied the European Commission's instruction from November, according to which the shareholders of sanctioned companies cannot exercise their direct or indirect voting rights under any circumstances nor for any purpose, i.e. their voting right has to be entirely frozen.

The judgment of another Dutch court from September 2022, whereby SBK ART was allowed to partly exercise their voting rights on some topics after the company SBK ART had lodged an appeal with the Dutch court that they were not allowed to participate in shareholders' meetings and exercise their voting rights, has since been dismissed.

This current judgment has dismissed all requests of SBK ART and confirmed that the sanction rules prevented the representatives of SBK ART from being accepted at shareholders' meetings and voting at those meetings. SBK ART was also ordered to pay all court expenses regarding both the dismissed and the latest judgment of the Dutch courts.

This decision was also confirmed in January 2023 by the Commercial Department of the Court of Appeal of Amsterdam, the Netherlands, which also confirmed all decisions made at the Depositary Receipt Holders' Meeting of Fortenova Group, held as well in January 2023 in the Netherlands.

=== Sanctioned equity holders removed in ownership structure transformation ===
Fortenova grupa d.d. has announced on 9 July 2024 that its Dutch top holding company, Fortenova Group TopCo B.V., has successfully completed the transformation of its ownership structure. This was achieved by closing the pending sale of Fortenova Group MidCo B.V. (which holds Fortenova grupa d.d. and all Fortenova grupa operating companies) to Iter BidCo B.V., composed of non-sanctioned equity holders of TopCo. Consequently, Fortenova Group no longer has any sanctioned or Russian or Belarusian equity holders. Upon completion and following a subscription process in which all non-sanctioned and non-Russian or Belarusian persons were entitled to participate in Iter BidCo B.V. on the same terms as Open Pass, Open Pass has become the majority equity holder with a 93.78% stake in Iter BidCo B.V. Over 80 minority equity holders have decided to participate in the new ownership structure and together hold a 6.22% stake.

=== Divestment of Agriculture Division ===
By signing a Share Transfer Agreement, Fortenova Group and Podravka concluded the sale-purchase of Fortenova Group’s Agriculture Division, thus finalising the acquisition process of six companies that constitute its vertically integrated agricultural operations – Belje, Vupik, PIK Vinkovci, Energija Gradec, Belje Agro-Vet and Felix. The transaction value on a cash-free/debt-free basis amounted to EUR 333 million. The sale-purchase agreement was signed in July 2024 and the completion of the transaction took place following the obtainment of the usual regulatory approvals. The entire process was thus completed exactly a year after the first contacts with potential investors.

Two months later, in March 2025, Fortenova Group and Badel 1862 signed a Sale-Purchase Agreement whereby Badel 1862 has acquired a 100 percent share in the companies Agrolaguna d.d. from Poreč and Vinarija Novigrad d.o.o. Fortenova grupa d.d. acquired 100 percent of business shares in the company ENNA Fruit d.o.o. together with the shares that ENNA Fruit holds in the companies ENNA Fruit in Slovenia, Serbia, Bosnia and Herzegovina and Montenegro, as well as in the company Moslavina voće d.o.o., from the company Energia Naturalis. At the same time, Fortenova grupa d.d. also acquired 100 percent of the business shares of the company Kenty Adria d.o.o. and the production company Naturala d.o.o.

== List of larger companies in Fortenova Group ==
Retail:

- Konzum
- Poslovni sistemi Mercator
- Tisak
- Idea

Food:

- Jamnica
- Sarajevski kiseljak
- PIK Vrbovec
- Roto dinamic
- MG Mivela
