= Ernesto Schmitt =

American-born entrepreneur (born 1971)

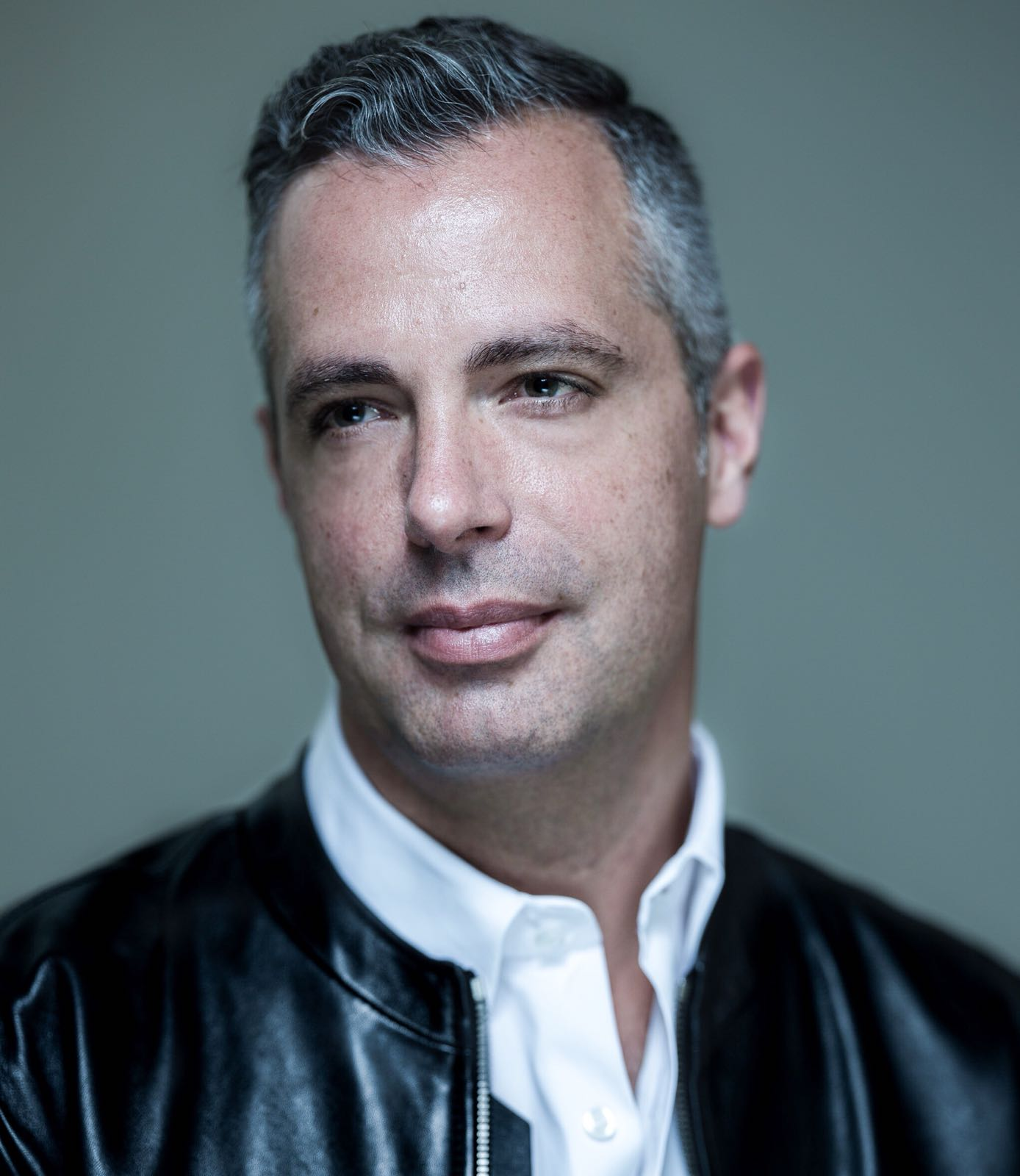
- Born: August 1971 (age 55); Cincinnati, Ohio, United States
- Citizenship: American, German
- Education: Churchill College, Cambridge (MEng); INSEAD (MBA)
- Occupations: Investor, Entrepreneur
- Known for: The Craftory, Beamly; DriveTribe, Fabula AI, Silverscreen, Peoplesound
- Children: 2
- Relatives: see relatives

Ernesto Gottfried Schmitt (born August 1971) is an American-born entrepreneur and investor. A founder of PeopleSound, Beamly and DriveTribe, he also founded venture capital fund The Craftory, with a $600m first fund for consumer goods challenger brands.

Born in Cincinnati, Ohio to a German father and Uruguayan mother, Schmitt was raised in Brussels and Mexico. He attended Churchill College, Cambridge, where he received an MA in manufacturing engineering, later attaining an MBA from INSEAD. He went on to reside in the United Kingdom. During the dot-com boom, Schmitt founded PeopleSound, the first platform for digital music streaming, which was backed pre-IPO by Bernard Arnault. Seen as one of the highest profile new-age internet startups, it was exited to Vitaminic in 2001 and listed.

Schmitt also founded Beamly, which pioneered social television, and was backed by HBO and Comcast before being acquired by S&P 500 component Coty, Inc., as well as social media platform DriveTribe alongside Richard Hammond, James May and Jeremy Clarkson. Other notable involvements include co-founding deep-learning company Fabula AI, acquired by Twitter in June 2019.

== Early life and education ==
Schmitt was born in Cincinnati, Ohio where his father, Gottfried E. Schmitt, worked for Procter and Gamble. He grew up in Brussels and Mexico. Schmitt's grandparents through his mother, Maria del Carmen Vieytes, are the Uruguayan actress Nelly Weissel and artist Juan Fernando Vieytes Pérez.

After attending high school in Brussels, Schmitt was educated at the University of Cambridge, studying engineering, where he graduated top of class. After a year consulting for Boston Consulting Group, Schmitt received his MBA with distinction from INSEAD in Fontainbleau, France.

== Business ventures ==
=== PeopleSound and dot-com bubble ===
In 1999, Schmitt founded PeopleSound. Going live in October 1999, it was the first European music streaming platform and the most visited. At peak, it was amongst the top ten most-visited entertainment websites in Europe, with millions of registered users, and one of the highest profile new-age internet startups.

PeopleSound offered customers two free songs from every band as a taster and then invited customers to create their own compilations in CD Realaudio or MP3 format. It famously offered artists £100 for each submitted song. A darling of the dot-com boom, and receiving significant coverage, PeopleSound raised money based on a valuation of around £70m (in 1999), from Bernard Arnault's Europe@Web, investors including Finnish wireless communications operator Sonera Corporation and venture capital firm Zouk Ventures. Schmitt experienced significant media coverage at the time as an key example of the dot-com boom, including in the BBC documentary "Inside Dot Com". Being ranked in the top ten most popular entertainment sites and as one of the highest-profile tech startups in the UK; Les Echos named Schmitt "one of the elite figures of the London Net-economy", while ZDNet declared him "one of the UK's better known Web entrepreneurs".

In 2001, Vitaminic, the Italian-owned rival music website bought PeopleSound and merged services. The combined entity was listed on the stock exchange in Italy. By August 2001, and following the internet bubble boom of mid-2000, Schmitt quit to take up a senior role for EMI in New York.

=== Silverscreen ===
In 2003, Schmitt founded Silverscreen alongside Sebastian James. Starting from an initial six stores in 2003, Silverscreen was the United Kingdom's first specialist DVD high street retailer offering an extensive selection of chart and non-chart products. The chain was credited with pioneering the implementation of editorial-led catalogue recommendation in mainstream retail, bringing alive deep archive titles in entertaining hotspots such as "before they were famous", "so bad, they're good", or "the greatest car chases on film".

Apax backed the original launch of Silverscreen in 2003 with £3.5m of funding and followed it up with a secondary fundraising of £20m in 2004 to help finance the company's ambitious plans to open 160 stores. The company received ~£33M total in funding and turnover in excess of £85 million.

=== Beamly & Social Television ===
In April 2011 Schmitt founded Beamly alongside Anthony Rose. Originally called tBone, then Zeebox, Beamly was marketed as a social discovery and engagement platform with 2nd-screen TV, creating the concept of social television.

Beamly, then called Zeebox, aimed to provide the optimal platform for connected television, making it a social and interactive viewing experience rather than the standard television viewing format. The platform allowed users to follow and interact with their favourite TV shows, as well as play games and take part in polls. It expanded to the US in September 2012 and into Australia in November. Beamly took on funding from BSkyb, Comcast, NBCUniversal, Viacom and HBO. Its first round valued it at above US$150M. It was sold to the New York Stock Exchange listed S&P 500 component Coty, Inc. in 2015 for an undisclosed sum.

=== Drivetribe ===
DriveTribe is an automotive online community platform founded by Schmitt, alongside The Grand Tour presenters Jeremy Clarkson, James May and Richard Hammond. The platform features different automotive-themed 'tribes' which people can join, post to, live chat with members of and share content on The website launched in November 2016 with a few selected tribe members. Financing for DriveTribe came from, among others 21st Century Fox and Breyer Capital, who have invested respectively $6.5 and $5.5 million in the platform.

=== The Craftory ===
Schmitt co-founded The Craftory with Elio Leoni Sceti as an alternative to traditional venture capital. it focuses on cause-driven investment in the consumer goods sector, investing in companies that positively impact the categories they serve. As of 2022, The Craftory has more than $600 million in permanent, early stage and growth capital (Series A, Series B etc.) to back 'challenger brands'.

=== Other Positions ===
Schmitt previously worked for EMI Music as President of EMI Music's catalogue division and President of Global Marketing. In 2018, Schmitt Co-Founded Fabula AI, which aimed to solve the problem of online disinformation, or 'Fake News' by looking at how it spreads on social networks Twitter announced its acquisition of Fabula AI for an undisclosed sum on 3 June 2019.

== Personal life ==
He has two children and resides in London, United Kingdom.
