= Elio Leoni Sceti =

Italian businessman and investor (born 1966)

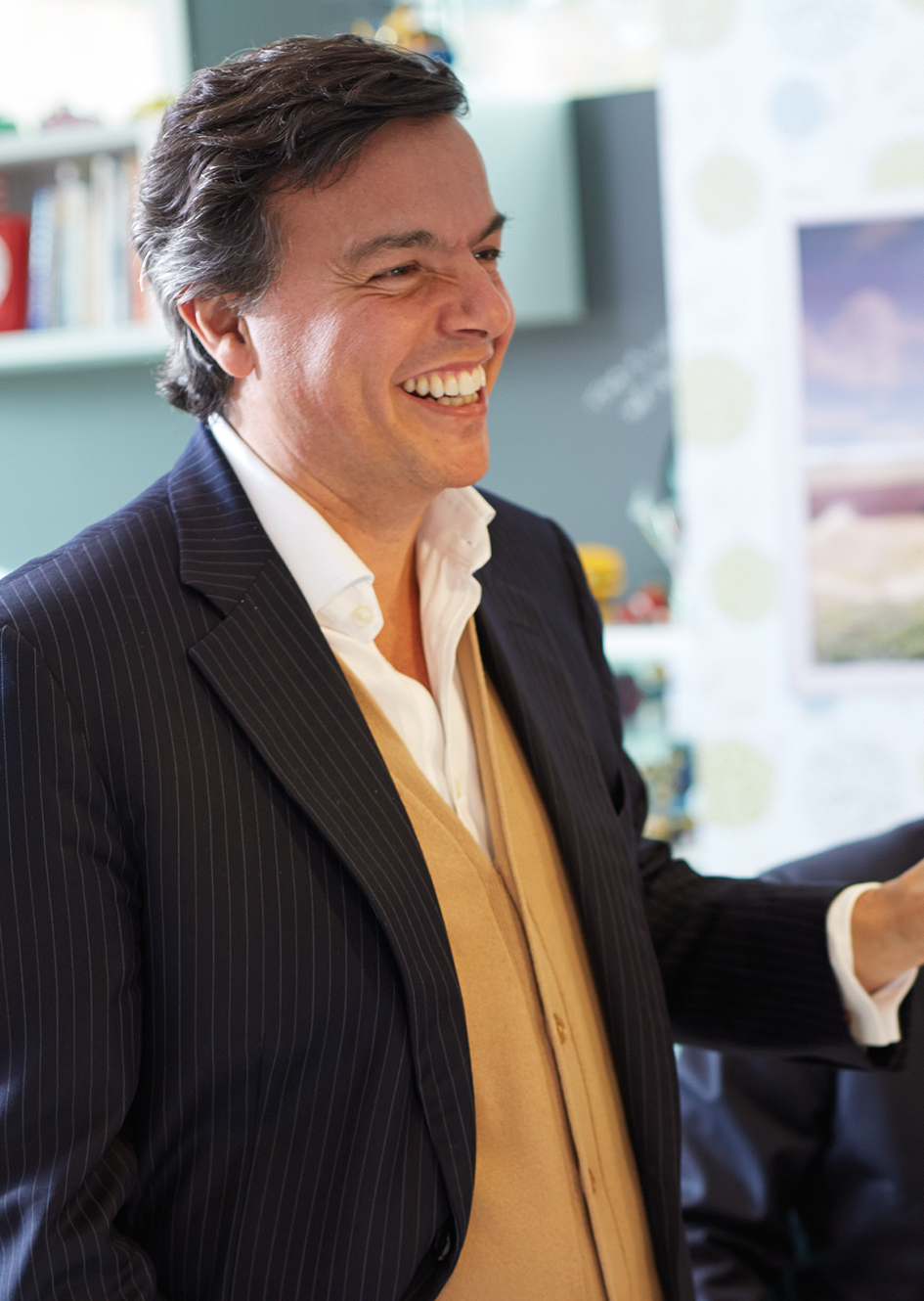
- Born: 3 January 1966 (age 60); Rome, Italy
- Education: Luiss University
- Occupations: Businessman, investor
- Board member of: Leoni Sceti Group Limited; AB InBev; Kraft Heinz; Barry Callebaut; Room to Read; One Young World Ltd
- Website: www.lsgholdings.com

Elio Leoni Sceti (born 13 January 1966) is an Italian businessman and an investor in early-stage companies. He co-founded The Craftory, a $500 million venture capital fund for challenger brands, in 2018. He is also chair of LSG Holdings, and sits on the boards of Kraft Heinz, Room to Read and One Young World.

Leoni Sceti was formerly on the boards of Barry Callebaut and beverage and brewing multinational Anheuser-Busch InBev. He was CEO of record label EMI Music, one of the "Big Four", until 2010, and later from 2013 to 2016 was the CEO of Iglo Group, and a director of Nomad Foods.

== Early life and education ==
Born in Rome in 1966, Leoni Sceti went to school in Lausanne, Switzerland before returning to Rome to study economics at Luiss University. After graduating, he completed a postgraduate course in corporate law and tax, finishing top of his class.

== Career ==
=== P&G and Reckitt Benckiser ===
In 1988, he joined Procter & Gamble's French and Italian business as one of its youngest ever brand managers. In 1992, he moved to Reckitt Benckiser as a category manager before becoming global head of category development and innovation in 2001. From 2005 to 2008 he was head of the company's European division, during which time he developed new variants in Reckitt's product range, working with brands such as Cillit Bang, Calgon, Finish and Airwick. In total he worked for 16 years at Reckitt Benckiser, in six different countries.

=== EMI ===
In July 2008, Leoni Sceti became the CEO of EMI's recorded music division. He returned the division to operational growth before leaving in 2010 to invest in early-stage technology companies, including social TV startup Beamly, of which he became chairman.

=== Iglo ===
Leoni Sceti is a former CEO of European frozen food company Iglo Group. While CEO he refocused the group's marketing strategy to include educational campaigns about the benefits of frozen food and its role in reducing food waste. In May 2015 he oversaw the sale of Iglo to Nomad Foods, stepping down as CEO to become a director of Nomad, before stepping down from Nomad in May 2016.

=== The Craftory ===
In May 2018 Leoni Sceti co-founded The Craftory, an investment house for consumer product challenger brands. The Craftory invests in owner-operated companies with annual revenues of more than $10m, in sectors including beauty, health, food, beverages and household products. It is the first investment group to focus on growing challenger brands across the consumer packaged goods space.

Leoni Sceti and co-founder Ernesto Schmitt launched The Craftory with $300 million in investment capital, including $60m from Spice Private Equity.

=== Other activities ===
In April 2015, cosmetics group Coty announced Leoni Sceti was to become its new CEO in July. Two months later, the company said he had "reconsidered and decided not to join Coty." He was paid $1.8 million in severance.

Leoni Sceti has been a non-executive board member of beverage and brewing multinational Anheuser-Busch InBev since April 2014. In December 2017 he became a board member of the chocolate and cocoa manufacturer Barry Callebaut. He is co-founder and chairman of The Leoni Sceti Group, a UK-based firm with interests in real estate, private equity and venture capital.

Leoni Sceti is a councilor and director at the non-profit organisation One Young World and a board member at Room to Read, a non-profit organization for improving literacy and gender equality in education in the developing world.

== Personal life ==
He is married with four children. In a Times interview in January 2014, he gave his motto as ‘per aspera ad astra et semper ad majora’, (‘through adversity to the stars and on to better things’).
