= Martin E. Franklin =

British-American businessman

Sir Martin Franklin KGCN
- Born: 31 October 1964 (age 61); London, England
- Education: University of Pennsylvania
- Occupation: Businessman
- Known for: Co-founder & chairman of Nomad Foods, Element Solutions Inc., and Jarden
- Board member of: Restaurant Brands International, Element Solutions Inc., Nomad Foods, APi Group Corporation
- Spouse: Julie Hinds
- Children: 4
- Parent(s): Sir Roland Franklin; Nina, Lady Franklin
- Relatives: Ellis Arthur Franklin (grandfather); Rosalind Franklin (aunt)

Sir Martin Ellis Franklin, KGCN (born 31 October 1964) is a British American, Miami-based businessman. He is the founder and chairman of Element Solutions Inc.; co-founder and co-chairman of Nomad Foods Limited, and co-founder and former chairman of Jarden Corporation, which was sold to Newell Brands in 2016. Franklin is also the founder and CEO of Mariposa Capital, a Miami-based family investment firm; a director of Restaurant Brands International Inc.; chairman and controlling shareholder of Royal Oak Enterprises, LLC, and is a principal and executive officer of several other private investment entities.

== Early life ==
Martin Ellis Franklin was born on 31 October 1964 in London, England. His father, Sir Roland Franklin, was a merchant banker who undertook hostile takeovers with Sir James Goldsmith. Franklin emigrated to the United States with his family at the age of fifteen, settling in Harrison, New York.

Franklin graduated from the University of Pennsylvania, where he received a Bachelor of Arts degree in political science.

== Business career ==
After leaving college, Franklin worked for N M Rothschild & Sons in Manhattan, where he became the youngest vice president in the U.S. firm's history. As James Goldsmith began winding down his U.S. operations in 1987, Martin joined his father in forming the Pembridge Group. They undertook a series of transactions between 1987 and 1989, the largest of which was the $1.3 billion hostile takeover of Dickinson Robinson Group (DRG). At age 24, Franklin was appointed as CEO of DRG, with the goal of breaking up the conglomerate via a series of asset sales. Roland Franklin retired from active business in 1991, leaving Martin and Ian Ashken to oversee the final DRG asset sales. In 1992, they returned to the U.S. with the intention of using their experience at DRG to build, rather than break up, companies.

In October 1992, Franklin formed Benson Eyecare from the merger of shell public company Ehrlich Bober, an optical retail chain and Benson Optical, which was acquired from the pension fund of General Electric for US$2.3 million. Benson Eyecare relisted from the American Stock Exchange to the New York Stock Exchange, and Franklin served as its CEO. He was the youngest CEO of a corporation listed on the NYSE. Through a series of acquisitions and organic growth, Benson Eyecare grew from $40 million in annualized revenue in 1992 to $150 million in 1996, when the company was sold to Essilor for US$300 million, creating a 23-fold return for early investors.

Between 1996 and 2000, Franklin chaired, invested, or both, in companies such as Bolle, Lumen Technologies, Crunch Fitness and Corporate Express. Franklin and Ashken decided to try to move from the public company world where they had operated for the last ten years to the private company world and purchased 9.9% of Alltrista Corporation in January 2000 and made an offer to buy the whole company. When their bid failed, they became activist boards members in July 2001. In September 2001, Franklin became Alltrista's chairman and CEO while Ashken became its vice-chairman and CFO. Alltrista was renamed Jarden Corporation and Franklin served as its chairman and chief executive from 2001 to 2011, and as its executive chairman from 2011 to 2016 when James E Lillie became Jarden's CEO. Under Franklin's leadership, Jarden grew from approximately $300 million in revenues to more than $10 billion, having over 120 global brands and 35,000 employees before it was acquired by Newell Brands, in April 2016. For the 15 years of Franklin's chairmanship, Jarden generated over a 5,000 per cent stock returns for its investors with a compound return of over 30%.

As executive chairman of Jarden, Franklin earned US$44 million in 2013. The following year, in 2014, he earned US$118 million, US$110.8 million of which was in shares, with a salary of US$2.2 million. He earned US$231 million in total from 2010 through 2014.

Starting in 2006, Franklin founded a series of Special Purpose Acquisition Companies, initially with Nicolas Berggruen, but also including William Ackman. The SPACS enabled companies such as GLG, Prisa, Phoenix Life, Burger King, and Macdermid Specialty chemicals to go public. Franklin co-founded Justice Holdings, a shell company on the London Stock Exchange which invested in Burger King. Franklin owned 2% in 2012. As of 2019, Franklin continues to serve on the Board of directors of Restaurant Brands International, which owns Burger King and Tim Hortons, and Element Solutions Inc.(formerly Platform Specialty Products).

Platform Specialty Products has made a number of acquisitions, including MacDermid, a chemical company, for US$1.8 billion in October 2013; Arysta LifeScience Limited, an agrochemical company, for US$3.5 billion in October 2014; Agriphar, an agrochemical business, for U$S400 million in October 2014; Chemtura Corporation's AgroSolutions business for US$1 billion in November 2014; OM Group's Electronic Chemicals and Photomasks businesses for US$365 million in June 2015; and Alent plc for US$2.1 billion in July 2015. In June 2018, Platform Specialty announced that it had agreed to sell its Agricultural Solutions business, Arysta LifeScience, to UPL Corporation Ltd. For US$4.2 billion. In 2019, Platform Specialty changed its name to Element Solutions Inc.

Franklin co-founded Nomad Foods, a frozen food company which sells products under the Birds Eye and Findus brands, with Noam Gottesman in 2014. In April 2015, they acquired Iglo for €2.6 billion, followed by Findus Sverige AB, the continental European operations of Findus Group, for $780.7 million in August 2015; Goodfellas Pizza for US$275 million in January 2018; and Aunt Bessie's for US$281 million in June 2018.

In October 2017, Franklin, Ashken, and Lillie launched J2 Acquisition Limited, a $1.25 billion acquisition vehicle listed on the London Stock Exchange. J2 acquired APi Group, Inc., a market-leading business services provider of safety, specialty, and industrial services, for $2.9 billion, in 2019, at which time the company changed its name to APi Group Corporation. The company moved its listing to the NYSE, under the symbol APG, in April 2020.

In September 2020, Bloomberg reported that Franklin had launched six SPACs which had raised over US$8 billion since 2006. Franklin commented, during an interview with Bloomberg, that "We’re in silly season in SPAC-land" and that "This is going to end badly."

== Recognition ==
Franklin was named Antigua and Barbuda's Special Economic Envoy in January 2015.

In November 2018, Franklin was knighted, in the higher degree of knight grand cross, for his contributions to business, economic development, heritage restoration and community service in Antigua and Barbuda.

== Philanthropy ==
Franklin has supported a number of charities including the Challenged Athletes Foundation and Wounded Warrior Project.

== Personal life ==
With his wife Julie, he has three sons and one daughter. They reside in Miami, Florida. They own another residence in Aspen, Colorado, and they lived there in 2006–2007.

Franklin is an avid skier. Additionally, he has completed multiple marathons, 100 mile ultramarathons, and triathlons, including the Ironman Championships in Hawaii in 2003, 2005 (in 10 hours and 55 minutes) and 2017. In 2007, Franklin completed the Badwater Ultra marathon in 41 hours and 29 minutes. In 2009, he finished the Leadville Trail 100 Run in 27 hours and 45 minutes and in 2011 he completed the Leadville Trail 100 Mountain Bike Race in 10 hours and 30 minutes. In 2013, Franklin completed Jarden's Westchester Triathlon in 2 hours and 33 minutes. He also led a team of Jarden employees to compete in the Tri-State Tough Mudder, an endurance obstacle course event that has raised more than $5 million for the Wounded Warrior Project. In 2014, he competed in the Yam2Yam, which translates to "sea to sea," a 144 km ultramarathon race in Israel from Jaffa to Jerusalem which he completed in under 23 hours. In a 2010 interview in the Financial Times, he revealed, "I have my best ideas on a bicycle, or running over a mountain."
