= Goodfellas (disambiguation) =

Goodfellas (stylized as GoodFellas) is a 1990 crime drama film directed by Martin Scorsese.

Goodfellas may also refer to:

Arts, entertainment, and media

- Goodfellas (504 Boyz album), 2000
- Goodfellas (Show and A.G. album), 1995
- Goodfellas (soundtrack), the soundtrack to Scorsese's 1990 film

Brands and enterprises

- Goodfella's, Irish frozen pizza brand
- Goodfellas, international sales company formerly known as Wild Bunch International
