= DriveTribe =

Automotive social media brand

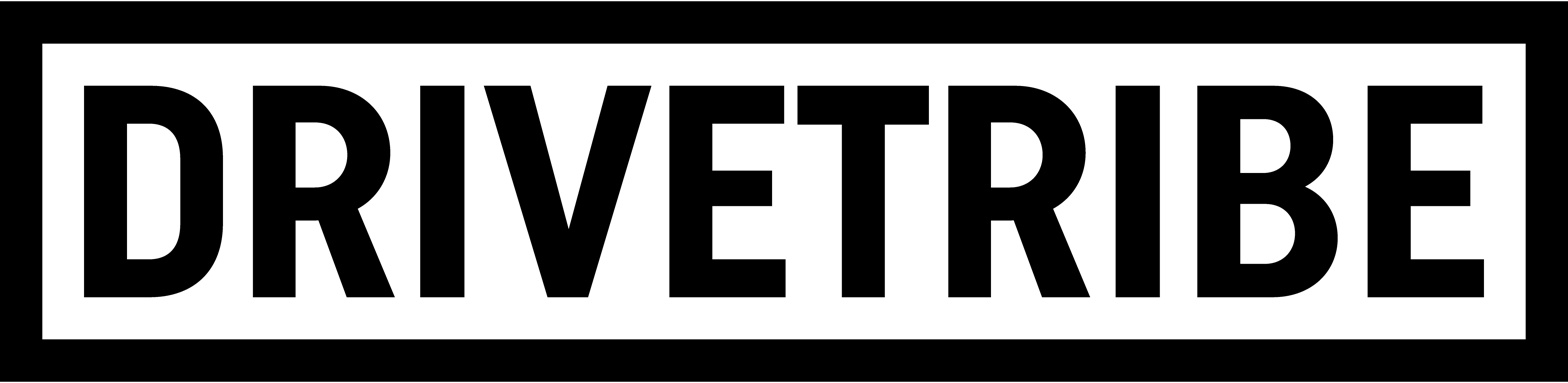
- Website type: Social Media Platform
- Headquarters: London, UK
- Founders: Ernesto Schmitt; Jeremy Clarkson; Richard Hammond; James May
- Website: drivetribe.com
- Commercial: Yes
- Users: 140m monthly active (2021)
- Launched: 28 November 2016; 9 years ago
- Current status: Platform shifted to social media

DriveTribe is a social networking platform founded as a hub for automotive content and digital socialising. Founded by presenters Jeremy Clarkson, James May and Richard Hammond alongside entrepreneur Ernesto Schmitt, the platform was characterised by its use of themed Tribes to build groups.

Launching to the public in late 2016, DriveTribe allowed users to find groups with unique characteristics and personalities that best reflected their motoring interests, whilst being able to create their own tribes. The platform was backed pre-launch by $5.5m from Breyer Capital via Jim Breyer, one of the first Facebook investors, and Atomico, followed by $6.5m from 21st Century Fox.

With a focus on motoring, the platform scaled rapidly, and by 2018, DriveTribe had 10 million daily active users and 140 million monthly users across its platforms. In 2021, the platform announced it was shifting to other social media platforms. DriveTribe has 600.6 million total views and 3.03 million subscribers on their YouTube channel as of 4 April 2026.

== History ==
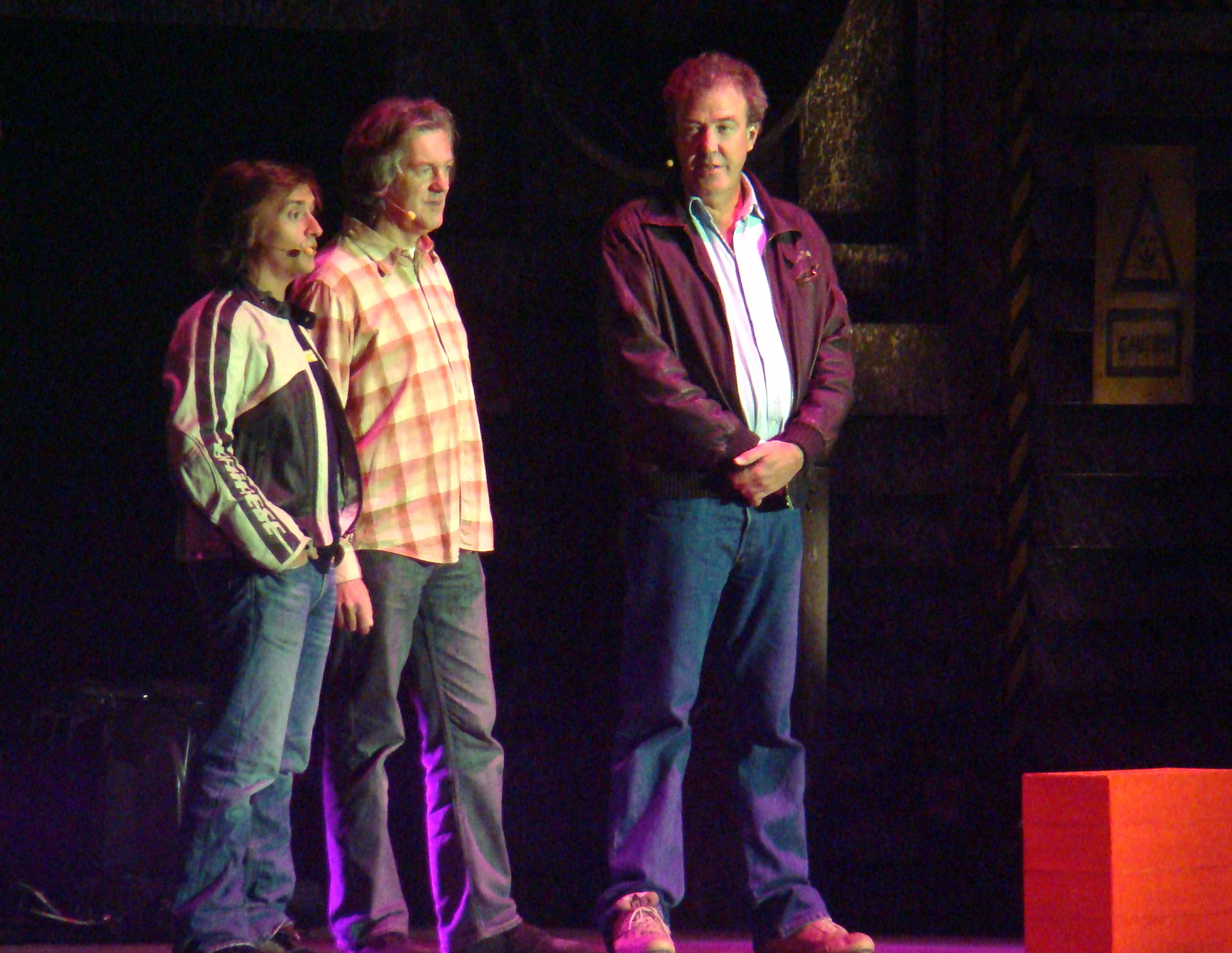
From left to right: Richard Hammond, James May and Jeremy Clarkson in 2008

DriveTribe was announced in April 2016, having been in stealth mode since December 2015, founded by the Top Gear trio; Jeremy Clarkson, Richard Hammond, and James May, alongside Ernesto Schmitt, a serial entrepreneur who had recently exited Beamly. Andy Wilman, the Top Gear producer was also noted as a founder. The platform was launched as the home for motoring, similar to what "Twitch (is) for video games or TripAdvisor for travel." Variety noted that despite motoring being a "a bigger interest category than News & Current Affairs (410 million), Football (380 million) or Pets, Dating and Toys combined", there was no single, massive online destination for motoring enthusiasts, until DriveTribe. The idea was that once successful, the Tribe model could be "extended [..] into other verticals, which could include fashion, music or food".

The platform planned to "build an engine to send content that will specifically target the disparate communities that make up car fans — from petrolheads to classic car aficionados", and users would be able to join tribes that reflected their interests.

"Gamers have got Twitch, travellers have got TripAdvisor and fashion fans have got, oh, something or other too. But people who are into cars have got nowhere. There's no grand-scale online motoring community where people can meet and share video, comments, information and opinion. DriveTribe will change that."

— Richard Hammond

=== Launch ===
DriveTribe's launch to much fanfare on November 28 was pre-empted by a teaser video from Clarkson, Hammond and May. Made up of thousands of tribes, including racing driver Oliver James Webb, motoring journalist Jethro Bovingdon, Finnish blogger Sara Nase, Mark Webber, Damon Hill and many others, the platform initially limited who was able to start a tribe. Clarkson described the platform as "DriveTribe is YouPorn for Cars." By January 2017, there were 20,000 contributors. A quarter million content pieces were posted on DriveTribe in its first six weeks, with 2 million content views per day in January, up from 1 million in December, the platform's first month of activity'. The company scaled to over 140m monthly platform users by 2021. In 2019 the FoodTribe website and YouTube channel were launched, focusing and food and drinks, with Rachel Hogg being appointed as editor.

=== Tribes ===
DriveTribe hinged on the concept that users would sign up to the "tribe", each with its own "unique characteristics and personality", that best reflects their motoring interests, whilst being able to create their own. Each of the three presenters had their own tribe, with DriveTribe envisioning tribes focusing on different niches in the automotive world, all under the DriveTribe hub. Clarkson's "tribe" is called "Alfa Male." Hammond's is "Hammond's Fob Jockeys." May's is "James May's Carbolics.".

"We are taking a sector via a channel and augmenting it with a community around the concept of a tribe. A tribe is a group of people, surrounding a leader, rallying around a common cause. That leads to a huge level of engagement."

— Ernesto Schmitt

Content was envisioned to be created by the three presenters, an editorial staff of between 15 and 30 full-time members, as well as attracting "stars, bloggers, writers, and videographers" to create their own content, "delivered across multiple platforms (Facebook, Instagram, Snapchat), while automatically tailoring headlines, images, and layout to individual consumers".

"This is pure digital inclusivity. Some of the world's most endangered tribes — Volvo enthusiasts, for example — will now have a voice as loud as everyone else's."

— James May

=== Funding ===
Initial funding for DriveTribe came from Clarkson, Hammond and May, before DriveTribe raised $5.5m from Breyer Capital via Jim Breyer, one of the first Facebook investors, and Atomico, followed by $6.5m from 21st Century Fox three weeks later and pre-launch, with Fox noting to TechCrunch "We saw the DriveTribe platform and we were blown away by its ingenuity".

== Leadership ==
The company's founders were directors on W Chump and Sons T Shirts & Mugs Limited on companies house. Leadership primarily consisted of Schmitt; previously founded Beamly, PeopleSound and had been executive chair of Invision, who brought on Jonathan Morris as CTO, who was previously CTO of the Financial Times. Schmitt left DriveTribe in mid 2017.

== Commercialisation ==
Pre launch, Ernesto Schmitt, as CEO, noted that automotive as the "biggest advertising category in the world — with $45 billion media spend projected for 2016" provided DriveTribe large opportunity for commercialisation through native advertising and social commerce.

In April 2018, DriveTribe announced its first commercial partnership, with German car manufacturer Audi. In June 2018, DriveTribe launched a joint partnership with JOE Media and Renault, a six-figure deal focusing on the launch of the Megane RS. Renault UK marketing director, Adam Wood, said the partnership would look to "engage a broader lifestyle market through original content production, influencer led activation and editorial support."

In November 2018, the DriveTribe CEO, Jonathan Morris, described the four elements of the company's commercial model, which include content creation, distribution, and data insights, the latter of which is made possible because DriveTribe's tech stack is built on Apache Flink.

== Shift to social media ==
On 10 January 2022, DriveTribe announced they would be shutting down the DriveTribe and FoodTribe websites at the end of the month, citing reductions in revenue due to lower marketing budgets across the automotive industry and a global shortage of computer chips caused by the COVID-19 pandemic. Co-founder Richard Hammond stated that they would be keeping the DriveTribe community alive through their established social media and YouTube channel. Jeremy Clarkson and James May would also be making appearances from time to time. The FoodTribe YouTube channel was rebranded as What Next? in June 2022, expanding its scope from food & drink to other non-car related topics.

The car channel is currently hosted by Ben Collins, as well as Richard and Izzy Hammond and was previously hosted by Mike Fernie. In November 2025, Fernie announced his departure from DriveTribe and launched his own car related YouTube channel.
