= Simon Miller =

Simon Miller may refer to:

- Simon David Miller, British film writer, director, producer and investor
- Simon Miller (rugby union), South African rugby union player
- Simon Miller (wrestler), British professional wrestler.

== See also ==
- Who Is Simon Miller?, a 2011 American spy family television film
