= William Jackson Food Group =

Yorkshire food company

William Jackson & Son Limited
- Type: Private
- Industry: Food manufacturing
- Founded: 1851; 175 years ago
- Founder: William Jackson
- Headquarters: Hessle,
- Area served: United Kingdom
- Key people: Nicholas Oughtred (chairman)
- Subsidiaries: William Jackson Food Group Limited
- Website: www.wjfg.co.uk

William Jackson & Son Limited (trading as the William Jackson Food Group) is a British food manufacturer.

== History ==
The company was founded by William Jackson (1828–1912), who was born in Elstronwick and opened his first shop at 28 Scale Lane in Hull in 1851. He originally traded as a grocer and tea dealer.

The Jacksons Stores chain, which by that time comprised 114 convenience stores across the north of England, was sold to Sainsbury's in 2004.

The first bakery opened in 1891 and the current Jackson's bakery on Derringham Street opened in 1907.

The company developed a process for commercially producing Yorkshire puddings in 1968. In 1974, Butlin's leisure company asked the bakery to create a Yorkshire pudding for its holiday camps which led to the development of the Aunt Bessie's brand as of 2016 producing 20 million Yorkshire puddings a week.

The company acquired Abel & Cole in 2012 and The Food Doctor in 2016.

The company sold Aunt Bessie's to Nomad Foods in 2018.

== Current operations ==
The company's businesses include Abel & Cole (organic food delivery), Jacksons (bakery), MyFresh (vegetable processing), The Food Doctor (snacks), Wellocks (supplier to the restaurant industry) and the Ferguson Fawsitt Arms in Walkington (pub-restaurant).
