= Vidal Sancho =

Spanish actor (born 1977)

Vidal Sancho (born 1977 in Bilbao, Spain), is a Spanish actor.

== Filmography ==
Year	Film	Role
2012	Knight Knight	Mysterious Knight
2011	My Family (TV series)	Isolation Controller
2011	Ángel o demonio (TV series)	Dr. Morales
2010	Doctors (TV series)	Mr. Venezuela
2010	Bluebird (short film)	Fighter
2008	The Run	Check-In Clerk
2007	Elizabeth: The Golden Age	Spanish Minister
2007	Seachd: The Inaccessible Pinnacle	The Spaniard
2007	Hotel Babylon (TV series)	Franco
2006	Children of Men	Basque Rebel (uncredited)
2006	Dalziel and Pascoe (TV series)	Juanito Torres
