= Element Solutions =

American chemicals production company

Element Solutions Inc
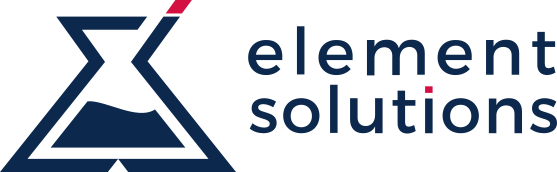
- Formerly: Platform Specialty Products Corporation (2013–2019)
- Type: Public company
- Traded as: NYSE: ESI; Russell 1000 component; S&P 600 component
- Founded: 2013; 13 years ago
- Founder: Martin E. Franklin
- Headquarters: 500 East Broward Blvd., Fort Lauderdale, Florida, U.S.
- Key people: Benjamin Gliklich, CEO
- Products: Specialty Chemicals, technical services
- Revenue: ▲US$2.46 billion (2024)
- Number of employees: 5,300 (2024)
- Website: elementsolutionsinc.com

Element Solutions Inc is an American specialty chemicals production corporation listed on the New York Stock Exchange.

== History ==
The corporation was founded in 2013 by Martin E. Franklin, with financial backing from Bill Ackman.

In July, 2018, United Phosphorus Limited announced the acquisition of Arysta Life Sciences, the Crop business of Platform Specialty Chemicals for a total sum of $4.2 billion, with the latter exiting the crop business entirely. In 2019, the company changed its name to Element Solutions Inc. from Platform Specialty Chemicals. It is now listed as ESI on the New York Stock Exchange.

In March 2025, Element Solutions was added to the S&P SmallCap 600 Index.

== Operations ==
Element Solutions manufactures and supplies specialty chemicals for a broad range of solutions, including mobile phones, consumer electronics, communication infrastructure, automobile, industrial surface finishing, consumer packaging and offshore oil production and drilling.

Element Solutions operates in two segments: Electronics and Industrial & Specialty.

The Electronics segment researches, formulates and sells specialty chemicals and material process technologies for all types of electronics hardware, including complex printed circuit board designs and advanced semiconductor packaging. The Company’s wet chemistries for metallization, surface treatments and solderable finishes are leveraged in the electronics manufacturing process in mobile communications, computers, automobiles and aerospace equipment.

The Industrial & Specialty segment researches, formulates and sells specialty chemicals and material process technologies that enhance surfaces or improve industrial processes. The products include chemical systems that protect and decorate metal and plastic surfaces, and chemistries used in water-based hydraulic control fluids for offshore energy productions.

The Company owns a number of subsidiaries, which go to market under different brands, including MacDermid Enthone, MacDermid Offshore Solutions, MacDermid Alpha Electronics Solutions, Compugraphics, Fernox, Electrolube and Kester.

Element Solutions has 63 manufacturing and R&D sites in 18 countries.

== List of Transactions ==
Element Solutions has completed a number of transactions during its history, having purchased several specialty chemicals companies from 2013 through 2025:

- MacDermid Incorporated in October 2013
- the electronic chemicals and photomasks businesses of OM Group Inc. in October 2015
- Alent plc in December 2015
- Kester, a provider of solder and related products in December 2019
- DMP Corporation, a provider of turnkey wastewater treatment and recycle and reuse solutions in August 2020
- Coventya, a global provider of specialty chemicals for the surface finishing industry in September 2021
- HK Wentworth Limited, a manufacturer of electro-chemicals for the electronics, LED, automotive and industrial manufacturing industries based in the United Kingdom in May 2021
- HSO Herbert Schmidt GmbH, a developer of surface finishing technology and chemistry headquartered in Solingen, Germany in January 2022
- Kuprion, a developer of next-generation nano-copper technology to the semiconductor, circuit board and electronics assembly markets, in July 2023

During a July 2024 interview on Bloomberg TV, Element Solutions’ Chief Executive Officer Benjamin Gliklich said there is “an opportunity for incremental M&A” to build out its advanced electronics business and wants to fund future M&A opportunities through cash flows.

On February 28, 2025, Element Solutions sold its flexographic printing plate business, MacDermid Graphics Solutions, for $323 million.

On July 6 2026, it was announced that Element Solutions would be acquired by Solstice Advanced Materials for $14.5 Billion. This deal was called off on August 27th, 2026 as both companies said shareholder feedback led them to conclude they were better off remaining independent.
