= Frikom =

Serbian frozen food company

Coordinates: 44.922946°N 20.441483°E

- Official logo
- Native name: Фриком
- Type: d.o.o.
- Industry: Food processing
- Founded: 16 March 1976; 50 years ago
- Headquarters: Zrenjaninski put bb, Belgrade, Serbia
- Key people: Olga Ristić (Director); Jelena Lukić Chetcuti (Director)
- Products: Ice cream, frozen vegetables, etc.
- Brands: King, Macho, Kapri, Leni, Meda, Kontiki, Rumenko, Čoko Moko, Cmok, Sneško, and other
- Revenue: ▼€108.78 million (2020)
- Net income: ▼€8.42 million (2020)
- Total assets: ▲€106.91 million (2020)
- Total equity: ▲€86.24 million (2020)
- Owner: Nomad Foods (100%)
- Number of employees: 1,323 (2020)
- Subsidiaries: AGKOR Beograd d.o.o. Frikom Beograd DOOEL Skopje
- Website: www.frikom.rs

Frikom (full legal name: Industrija smrznute hrane Frikom d.o.o. Beograd) is a Serbian maker of ice cream, which also sells frozen fruit, vegetables, fish, and pastries.

== History ==
Frikom was established on 16 March 1976 in Belgrade, SFR Yugoslavia, as joint investment of PKB Corporation and Unilever. At first called Jedinica Zajedničkog Ulaganja (Joint Venture Unit), it was renamed Frikom – Kompanija Smrznute Hrane (FRozen Food KOMpany). Since 2003, it has been part of Croatian Agrokor group.

In 2008 Frikom bought 70 percent of the company for processing and trading of agricultural products "Nova sloga" from Trstenik, part of which is factory Mivela water, which has high levels of magnesium, for 4 million euros and committed to invest another 11 million euros. "Nova sloga" has the exclusive rights to exploit water in the field Mivela in Veluće, eight kilometers from Trstenik on an area of 4,125 square kilometers.

In September 2021 Fortenova Group (successor of Agrokor) sold Frikom along with Ledo plus and Ledo Čitluk to the British Nomad Foods.
