= Anthony Rose (businessman) =

British businessman

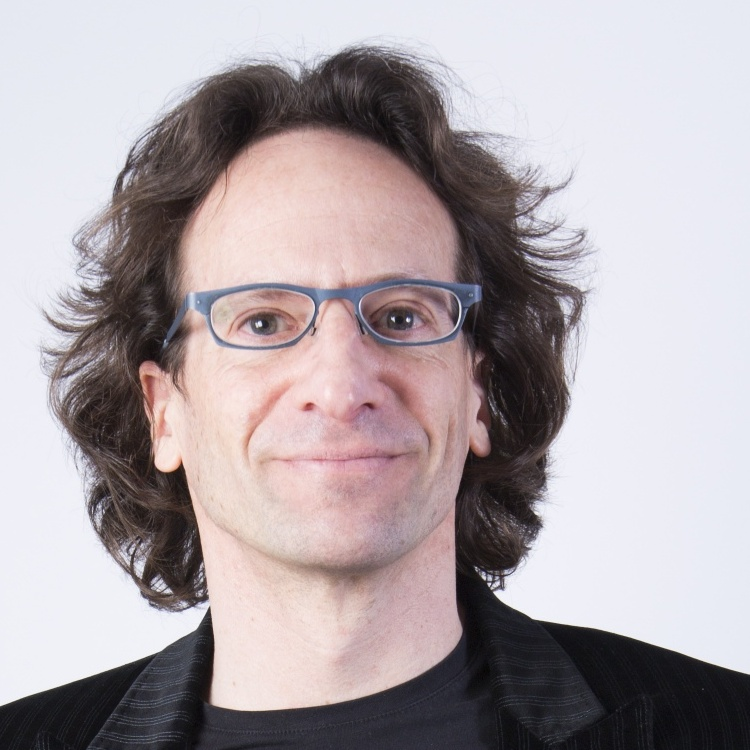
- Rose in 2017
- Born: 24 September 1964 (age 62); Cape Town, South Africa
- Education: University of Cape Town
- Organization: SeedLegals

Anthony Rose (born 24 September 1964) is a British businessman. He was the chief technology officer during the launch of BBC iPlayer.

Rose founded 5 companies after leaving BBC. He sold Beamly to COTY in 2015 and 6Tribes to the TopGear team in 2016; he co-founded QJAM and SeedLegals, and, as of 2025, serving as the CEO for the latter company.

== Career ==
In 2007, Rose was working for the file-sharing company Kazaa. He left to join the BBC as the CTO of iPlayer, which had been in development for years already, but had yet to launch. When Rose joined, the launch date was in ten weeks time. In 2009, Rose collected a Bafta Award for Innovation for iPlayer and the Royal Television Society awarded it the Judges' Award, noting in partcular Rose's contribution to the success. Rose left the BBC in 2010. In 2011, Rose founded Zeebox, later renamed to Beamly; it was sold to COTY in 2015 for an undisclosed amount. Rose founded 6Tribes, a social network, in 2015; it was eventually sold to Jeremy Clarkson, James May, and Richard Hammond in 2016, and is now used under the DriveTribe brand. Rose co-founded SeedLegals, a legal services platform for startups, in 2016 with Laurent Laffy and Anthony Drogon.
