= Aunt Bessie's =

UK producer of frozen food products

Aunt Bessie's Ltd

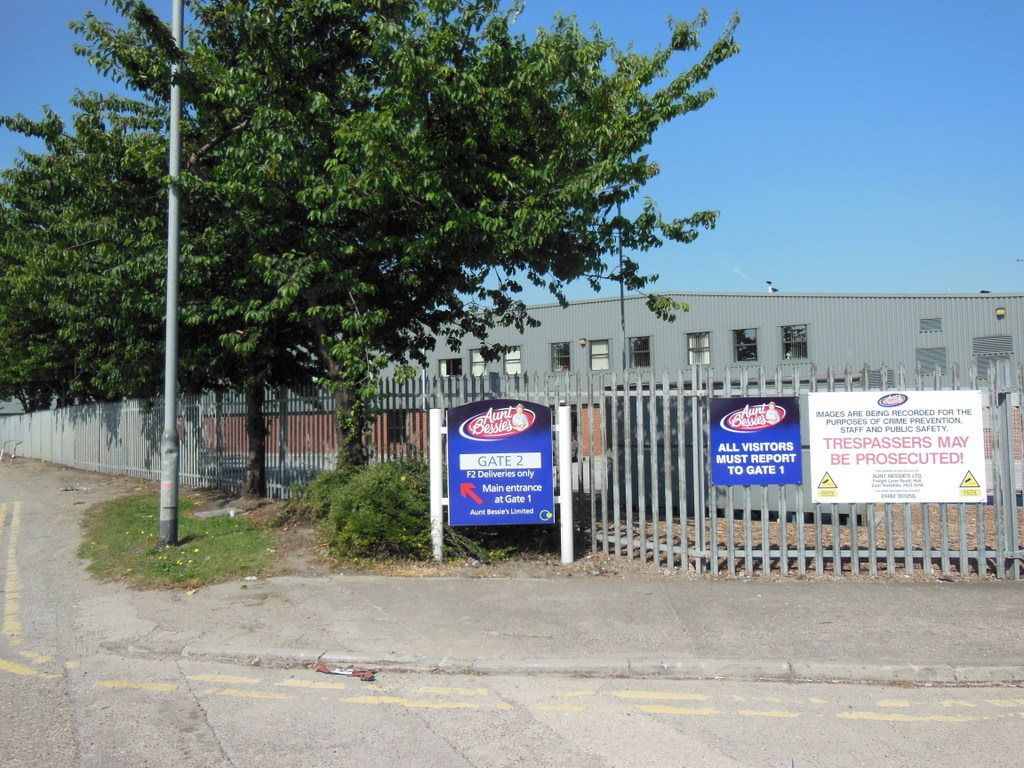
- Company type: Subsidiary
- Industry: Food
- Predecessor: Tryton Foods Ltd
- Founded: 1995
- Headquarters: Hull; Leeds
- Area served: United Kingdom
- Key people: Paul Heritage (Managing director)
- Products: Frozen food
- Number of employees: 350
- Parent: Nomad Foods
- Website: www.auntbessies.co.uk

Aunt Bessie's Limited (until 2008 known as Tryton Foods Ltd) is a UK producer of frozen food products under the brand name Aunt Bessie's. The company produces frozen Yorkshire puddings, potato products, meal accompaniments, ready meals, vegetables and desserts. The company has its factories in Hull and employs over 350 staff.

== History ==
Aunt Bessie's Limited was, until 2018, a subsidiary to the William Jackson Food Group, a food retail and manufacturing business founded in Hull in 1851. The current chairman, Nicholas Oughtred, is the great-great-grandson of the founder, William Jackson.

The William Jackson Group's frozen Yorkshire puddings were originally created for Butlins Holiday Camps in 1974. In 1995, the company started producing its Yorkshire puddings for British supermarket chains under the label Aunt Bessie's, so a special food manufacturing company was set up, called Tryton Foods. However, market research revealed that the name Triton was associated by the public with items such as "...either with bathrooms and showers or inter-continental ballistic missiles." So the name was changed to Aunt Bessie's as a marketing ploy.

Aunt Bessie's frozen roast potatoes were introduced in 1999 and were one of a number of products including chips and croquettes that had been manufactured under licence by Heinz at their factory in Norfolk until the contract for the deal ended in 2015.

=== Business development ===
By 2001 the retail value of the brand was over £50 million and it had become one of the top 100 brands in Britain. As the fastest growing frozen food brand its value had grown to £110 million by 2014 and in consumer surveys it had a recognition score of 70%. In August 2004, the supermarket division of the William Jackson company, Jacksons Stores, based in North Ferriby, was sold to Sainsbury's for £100 million, and the company began to focus on food production rather than retail. In early 2008, sales of the Aunt Bessie's Homestyle mashed potato doubled when it featured in Delia Smith's How to Cheat at Cooking for use in a shepherd's pie. The same year, the company name was changed to Aunt Bessie's Ltd. In its list of Britain's biggest brands, The Grocer ranked Aunt Bessie's at 50 in 2016 and 55 in 2017. In June 2018, Nomad Foods agreed to buy the Aunt Bessie's business from William Jackson for £210 million.
