= Juan Fernando Vieytes Pérez =

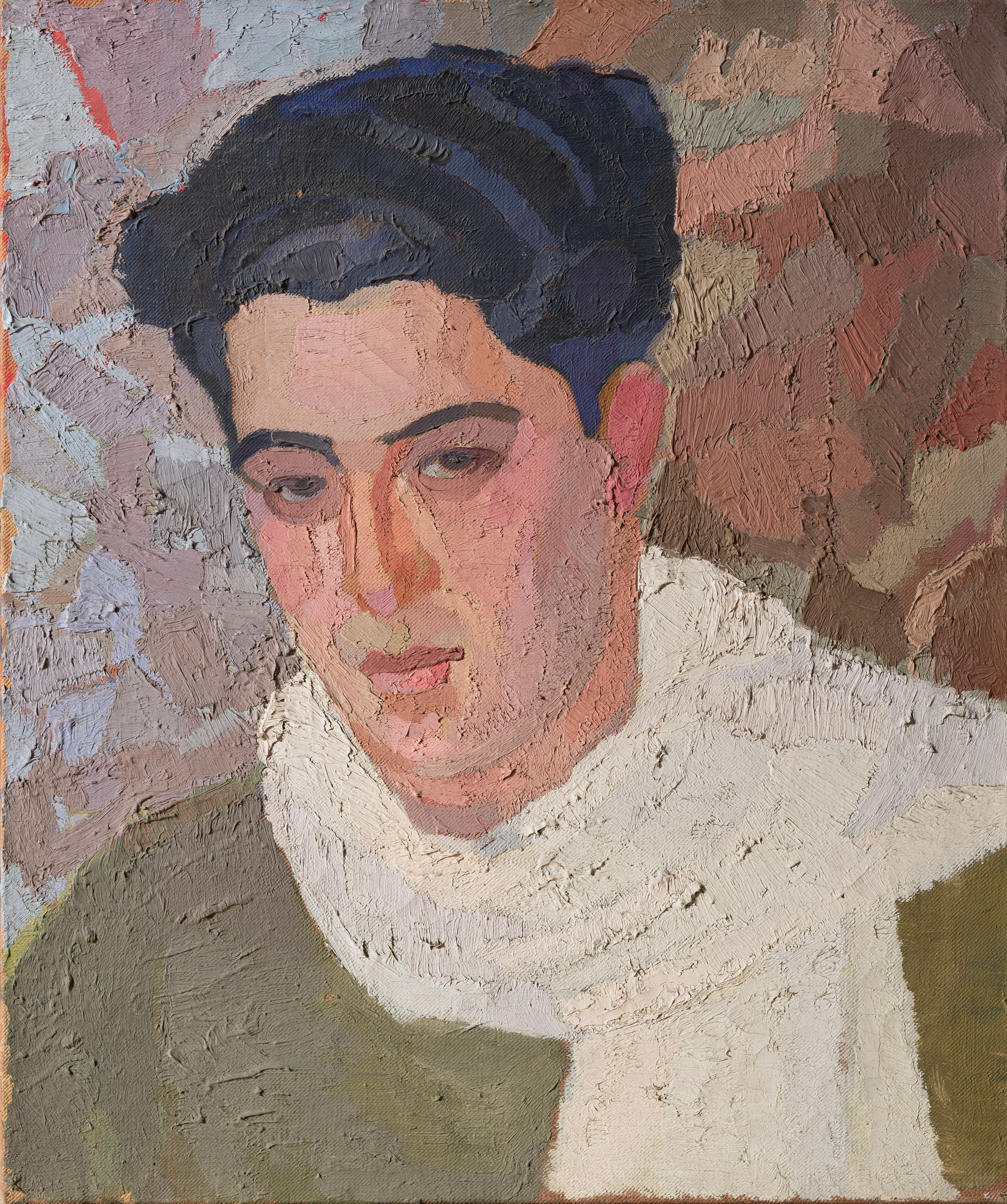
- Portrait of Vieytes by Guillermo Laborde.
- Born: Juan Fernando Vieytes Pérez; January 5, 1916. Montevideo
- Died: April 7, 1962; Montevideo
- Spouse: Nelly Weissel

Juan Fernando Vieytes Pérez, born in Montevideo on January 5, 1916, was a famous Uruguayan painter and visual artist. He won multiple national prizes before his death on April 7, 1962.

== Art career ==
Vieytes won his first Uruguayan National Art Prize for a painting he painted of his cousin, Margot Pérez. Throughout his career, he was an important figure on the Uruguayan art scene, and won a multitude of awards until his early death in 1962.

== Awards ==
=== First place ===
- 1939 - Salon Anual de Artes Plasticas (Montevideo)
- 1940 - Salon Anual de Artes Plasticas
- 1940 - Exposion de Pintura Francesa y Curso de Conferencias (Montevideo)
- 1943 - Salon Anual de Artes Plasticas
- 1943 - Salon Anual de Artes Plasticas
- 1943 - Salon Anual de Artes Plasticas
- 1943 - Salon Anual de Artes Plasticas

=== Bronze medal ===
- 1946 - Salon Anual de Artes Plasticas
- 1947 - Salon Anual de Artes Plasticas

=== Personal life ===
He was married to the famous Uruguayan actress Nelly Weissel, who he had a daughter with.

== See also ==
- Museo Nacional de Artes Visuales
