= Goodfella's =

Irish brand of frozen pizzas

- Type: Subsidiary
- Industry: Food
- Founded: 1993
- Headquarters: Ireland
- Area served: Ireland; United Kingdom
- Products: Frozen food
- Parent: Nomad Foods
- Website: www.goodfellaspizzas.com

Goodfella's is an Irish brand of frozen pizzas. Previously part of the Green Isle brand, owned by the 2 Sisters Food Group, the pizza brand was sold to Nomad Foods in 2018. The brand has operations in Naas, County Kildare and Longford, County Longford.

== History ==
Green Isle Foods Ltd, headquartered in Naas in Ireland, created the brand in 1993.

Green Isle Foods Ltd was founded in Ireland in 1982 and employed around 750 people in Ireland. The division was also known as Green Isle Food Group. In 2005, it expanded its Naas factory, adding 130 jobs. The site made 9-inch and 12-inch pizzas.

Green Isle Foods was subsequently bought by Northern Foods in 1995. Northern Foods had been founded on 15 August 1949 and also owned the Fox's Biscuits, Holland's Pies and Matthew Walker Christmas Puddings brands.

In 2011, 2 Sisters Food Group bought Northern Foods and then in April 2018 Nomad Foods bought the frozen pizza division, including the Goodfella's brand, from 2 Sisters. Nomad Foods, which is headquartered in the UK and formed in 2015, owns the Birds Eye, Findus, La Cocinera, Goodfella's and Aunt Bessie's brands.

== Production ==
The business has two manufacturing sites. One in Naas, the county town of County Kildare, which produces Goodfella's Stonebaked and Deep Pan pizzas, and one in Longford, County Longford, which produces Goodfella's Takeaway pizzas.

Goodfella's pizzas are produced in varieties called Stonebaked, Thin, Deep Pan and Takeaway. Goodfella's launched a range of gluten-free pizzas in 2015 and added to its dietary offering with the first ever branded frozen vegan pizza in 2018.
