= Silverscreen =

UK's first specialist DVD high street retailer, 2003–2006

Silverscreen was a British chain store brand founded in 2003 in the United Kingdom and focused on films. It was founded by Ernesto Schmitt and Sebastian James.

Starting from an initial six stores in 2003, Silverscreen was the United Kingdom's first specialist DVD high street retailer offering an extensive selection of chart and non-chart products (there was also the short lived "Playhouse" subsidiary of Our Price which specialised only in videos but this was back in the VHS era). The stores were designed to appeal to film fanatics as much as casual browsers, with all staff required to pass written movie- and TV-knowledge tests before joining. The chain was credited with pioneering the implementation of editorial-led catalogue recommendation in mainstream retail, bringing alive deep archive titles in entertaining hotspots such as "before they were famous", "so bad, they're good", or "the greatest car chases on film".

== Administration ==
After growing to 65 stores, capturing 5% of UK retail and employing over 700 staff, difficult trading conditions led to the business going into Administration at the end of March 2006. Silverscreen suffered from high rent due to their prime site locations, and had also been affected by high competition within the UK market from other music chains such as HMV, supermarket chains such as Tesco and Asda; and web sites such as Amazon.co.uk and Play.com.

Having failed to find a buyer for any significant part of the chain, all Silverscreen stores were closed by the end of May, 2006.
