= How to Cheat at Cooking =

2008 book by Delia Smith

- Author: Delia Smith
- Language: English
- Genre: Cookbook
- Publisher: Ebury Publishing
- Publication place: United Kingdom
- Media type: Print (hardcover)
- ISBN: 9780091922290
- OCLC: 182663144

How to Cheat at Cooking is a cookbook by television chef Delia Smith, published in 2008 by Ebury Publishing. It was her first book following her How To Cook series, and had a television series based on the same recipes on BBC Two. Following publication, Smith was criticised by other chefs due to the use of certain ingredients such as canned minced lamb, and by nutritionists because of the level of salt in some of the recipes. The book increased the sales of several products, described as the "Delia Effect", and has been credited with an increase in the sales of tinned meat over the following two years.

== Description ==
Original 1971 publication

British television chef Delia Smith's first published book was entitled How to Cheat at Cooking, published in 1971. This was a guide to how to combine off-the-shelf products to reduce the time and effort needed when creating meals at home. She had temporarily retired for five years after the success of her How To Cook book series. But she sought to re-create her original book in 2008, including reusing the original title, and hoped to enable people to take shortcuts in recipes.

Prior to the book's release, it was predicted that the "Delia effect" would repeat itself on some of the items mentioned in the book. This is where an ingredient or item mentioned by Smith would increase dramatically in sales – it had occurred in 2001 after she promoted cranberries, and additional sales of 54 million eggs have been credited to the chef after she demonstrated how to boil them on a television show. The media attempted to predict what items might see the effect occur prior to the release of the book; these suggestions included pasta by Fratelli Camisa, spice blends by a company called Seasoned Pioneers, frozen mashed potato by Aunt Bessie and bouillon powder. Joel Rickett, deputy editor of The Bookseller said that "She names particular products and the supermarkets have been scrambling for the ingredients. It will put huge pressure on producers – there's going to be a pitta bread maker somewhere absolutely besieged."

Following the launch of the book, a six-part television series appeared on BBC Two based on the same recipes. A spokesperson for the BBC said that

It's going to be something we've not done before with Delia, showing how to cut corners, but not cut corners on quality or taste. We're also going to show her life beyond the kitchen. It's great that she's coming back and it's showing more of her life than ever before.

== Reception ==
Based on pre-orders alone, the book was ranked at number 2 in the Amazon.co.uk top ten sales list on the Tuesday prior to launch. Borders reported needing to order additional deliveries of the book in order to keep up with demand, and Waterstone's suggested it was the fastest selling cook book of all time. Smith was relieved by the successful level of sales, saying "you never really know if you're on the right track or not until the public get exposed to it, so because there is a lot of interest I'm very happy."

Supermarket chain ASDA said that the sales of frozen chargrilled aubergine slices had increased by 150% due to the book. Smith responded to criticism about naming specific products by saying, "We debated long and hard whether to mention products but at the end of the day this book is for people who are either in a hurry or are afraid to cook. The more information you can give them the easier it is". She explained that she had never undertaken any paid promotion work of any products, saying that "I've never done any advertising because I feel I am in a position of trust, and that has been very liberating. I'm mindful that if you start getting paid, that is sometimes harder."

Fellow chefs objected to the recipes in the book. Dave Myers, one half of The Hairy Bikers, said that he couldn't conceive how the idea was meant to help with saving time, saying "

Why would you want to use a tin of mince to make shepherd's pie when it really doesn't take very long to brown a pack of fresh mince? And if this is about time-saving, why on earth would you want to go round three supermarkets to buy the ingredients? It is slightly mad.

Nutritionists criticised the levels of salt in some of the recipes, but agreed that tinned meat contains similar levels of protein to fresh versions and also keeps the original iron content. The group Consensus Action on Salt and Health, said that the recipe for carbonara contains more than the daily allowance of 6g salt per day because of the use of Pecorino Romano and ready-cooked bacon.

== Legacy ==
In addition to the Great Recession following the 2008 financial crisis, How to Cheat at Cooking was credited with increased sales to tinned products such as baked beans and canned meat such as mince within the UK during the following two years.
