= The Queen's Award for Enterprise: Sustainable Development (Environmental Achievement) =

The Queen's Award for Enterprise: Sustainable Development (Environmental Achievement) is awarded each year on 21 April by Queen Elizabeth II, along with the other two Queen's Awards for Enterprise categories.

== 2011 ==
The following organisations were awarded this year.

- Blue Skies Holdings of Pitsford, Northampton for fresh-cut fruit prepared at source so as to offer the freshest possible product to the consumer.
- Brighter Future Workshop of Skelmersdale, Lancashire for a training centre for young disabled people to recycle, service and repair mobility equipment.
- Brother Industries of Audenshaw, Manchester for continuous improvement, achievement and leadership in sustainable development.
- Lakehouse Contracts of Romford, Essex for Lakehouse Legacy - managing resources and relationships to ensure sustainability of business activities.
- Naturesave Policies t/a Naturesave Insurance of Totnes, Devon for ethical insurance cover for individuals, companies and the voluntary sector.
- easitNETWORK of Dorking, Surrey for easitNETWORK social enterprise scheme for promoting travel initiatives by more sustainable means of transport.
- Scottish Power of Glasgow for Sustainable development of Whitelee Windfarm for green energy.
- Seacourt Limited of Oxford for policy for reducing the environmental footprint of a printing company.
- Wates Group of Leatherhead, Surrey for the Wates Group approach to Corporate Responsibility.
- Yeo Valley Farms of Blagdon, Bristol for continuing support for sustainable organic British farming with core business activities.

== 2010 ==
The following organisations were awarded this year.

- Camira Fabrics of Mirfield, West Yorkshire for design and manufacture of contract textiles.
- Clinton Devon Estates of Budleigh Salterton, Devon for optimisation of resources in the management of a countryside business.
- Fairtrade Foundation of London for the licensing of the FAIRTRADE Mark and development and promotion of products sourced from the developing world.
- Gripple of Sheffield, South Yorkshire for hangers for mechanical and electrical services; wire joiners and tensioners for agricultural fencing and trellising.
- Radisson Blu Hotel, Edinburgh of Edinburgh, Scotland for its "Responsible Business Programme" encompassing environmental and social responsibility.
- Recycling Lives of Preston, Lancashire for waste management and recycling providing employment, accommodation and training for unemployed people.
- South West Lakes Trust of Launceston, Cornwall a combined environmental and recreation charity.
- Studio E Architects of London for introduction of sustainable principles to the built environment and for architectural practice.
- Triodos Bank of Bristol a sustainable bank working with organisations that have social, cultural and environmental benefits.
- The Venus Company of Totnes, Devon for beach catering and retail.

== 2009 ==
The following organisations were awarded this year.

- AESSEAL of Rotherham for environmental technology products.
- Avon Metals of Gloucester for their approach to management '20/20 vision' initiative.
- Boss Design of Dudley, West Midlands for their business sustainability approach – ensuring sustainable futures.
- Environmental Construction Products (trading as Green Building Store) Golcar, Huddersfield Manufacture and supply of sustainable building products.
- Knowsley Development Trust (trading as North Mersey Business Centre) of Knowsley, Merseyside for facilitation of social, economic, environmental, community, transport and enterprise projects.
- Northumbrian Water of Pity Me, Durham for continued commitment to responsible business practice.
- RDC Witham of Essex for computer re-use and recycling.
- Scottish Seabird Centre of North Berwick, East Lothian for sustainable tourism inspiring people to appreciate and care for wildlife and the natural environment.
- Sustrans of Bristol for projects that enable people to choose to travel in ways that benefit their health and the environment.
- UPM-Kymmene (trading as Shotton Paper) of Deeside, Flintshire for product and business improvement in the manufacture of newsprint.

== 2008 ==
The following organisations were awarded this year.

- BT Group of London for sustainability entrepreneurship - changing mindsets from risk to opportunity.
- Berkeley Group Holdings of Cobham, Surrey for developer of residential-led mixed use sustainable developments on brownfield sites.
- Blue Skies Holdings of Pitsford, Northamptonshire for preparation of cut fresh fruit at source for maximum freshness.
- Greenham Common Community Trust of Newbury, Berkshire for their sustainable approach to New Greenham park.
- Green-Works of Wembley, Middlesex for re-use, recycling and remanufacture of surplus office furniture.
- InterfaceFLOR of Halifax, West Yorkshire for 'MISSION ZERO' to eliminate any negative impact on the environment.
- Permanent Publications of Petersfield, Hampshire for multimedia materials providing inspiring information to enable people to live more sustainable lifestyles.
- Pureprint Group of Uckfield, East Sussex for 'Pureprint' environmental printing system.
- ScotAsh of Alloa, Clackmannanshire for development and production of sustainable construction materials from power station ash by-products.
- Shared Interest Society of Newcastle upon Tyne for ethical financial services using members' investments to deliver a more just world.
- Utilicom of Crawley, West Sussex for generation and supply of sustainable energy over a localised distribution network.
- Wessex Water of Bath for their approach to management of sustainability and stakeholder engagement.

== 2007 ==
The following organisations were awarded this year.

- Benchmark Woodworking of Hungerford, Berkshire for design/manufacture of bespoke furniture and specialist joinery with demonstrable commitment to sustainable manufacturing.
- Bettys & Taylors Group of Harrogate, North Yorkshire for sustainable business success powered by stakeholder engagement and good values.
- The Co-operative Group of Manchester for approach to sustainable development.
- Crest Nicholson of Chertsey, Surrey for sustainable homes and community regeneration.
- Epsilon Technical Services of Chester for explosion prevention safety services including ATEX certification and CE marking.
- Fibercore of Southampton, Hampshire for implementation of a worldwide cost effective sustainability programme.
- Seacourt Limited of Oxford for development of a strategy to reduce the environmental impact of a printing company.
- Yell of Reading, Berkshire for a fully integrated leadership and management approach.

== 2006 ==
The following organisations were awarded this year.

- Eco Arc: Ecological Architecture Practice of York for design of low energy, sustainable buildings relying on renewable energy
- North of England Zoological Society (Chester Zoo) of Chester for contributions to conservation, education and sustainability
- Sawdays Travel of Long Ashton, Bristol for reduction of carbon emissions.
- ScottishPower Renewables of Glasgow, Scotland for sustainable best practice in windfarm development.
- Shepherd Neame of Faversham, Kent for management of a brewery and public houses in Kent and South East England.
- Traidcraft of Gateshead, Tyne and Wear for promotion of fair trade, ethical business practices, social accounting and stakeholder engagement.
- Yeo Valley Farms (Production) Ltd of Blagdon, Bristol for their approach to management with continuing support for sustainable UK organic farming thereby minimising environmental impact.

== 2005 ==
The following organisations were awarded this year.

- Abel & Cole of London SE24 for Development of a socially responsible home delivery business.
- Adnams of Southwold, Suffolk for Values-based approach to business management.
- Best Foot Forward Limited of Oxford for Use of ecological footprint analysis to inform management decision-making.
- Clinton Devon Estates of Budleigh Salterton, Devon for Radical business integration of resources for managing a complex countryside business.
- Country Lanes of Fordingbridge, Hampshire for Cycle tourism specialist providing day trips, short breaks and longer holidays.
- Global Tea & Commodities of London SE16 for Vertically integrated tea, coffee and macadamia nut supply chain.
- Renewable Energy Systems Group of Kings Langley, Hertfordshire for Development, construction and operation of renewable energy generation sites.
- The Venus Company of Stoke Fleming, Dartmouth, for Devon Business mission to be the leading 'green' beach cafe' and shop operator in Europe.

== 2003 ==
The following organisations were awarded this year.

- BT Group of London EC1 for The BT programme for sustainable development.
- Beacon Print t/a The Beacon Press of Uckfield, East Sussex for Development of environmental procedures.
- Feilden Clegg Bradley Studios of Bath for Sustainable architecture and environmental research and innovation.
- Greenham Common Community Trust of Newbury, Berkshire for A sustainable business park.
- J&G Environmental of Blandford Forum, Dorset for Reprographic waste collection service.
- Rockware Glass of Knottingley, West Yorkshire for Sustainability in glass packaging production through recycling, technology and educational programmes.
- Seabait Limited of Ashington, Northumberland for Culture worms (polychaeta) as bait and animal feeds.
- Seaview Hotel & Restaurant of Seaview, Isle of Wight for Hotel and restaurant.
- St Gemma's Hospice of Leeds, West Yorkshire for Excellence in the management of hospice care leading to major improvements.
- Uniqema of Redcar, Cleveland for Emkarate RLrange of synthetic refrigeration lubricants.

== 2002 ==
The following organisations were awarded this year.

- Association of Chartered Certified Accountants of London WC2 for London WC2 An innovative social/environmental issues programme.
- The Co-operative Bank of Manchester for Manchester Partnership approach to management.
- Derwent Cumberland Pencil Company of Keswick, Cumbria for Keswick, Cumbria Solvent free paint application systems.
- Econnect Limited of Hexham, Northumberland for Hexham, Northumberland Grid integration of renewable energy.
- Interface Europe of Halifax for Halifax Sustainability vision and progress.
- Ormiston Wire of Isleworth, Middlesex for Isleworth, Middlesex Integration of sustainable development principles into corporate management.
- St George plc of Twickenham, Middlesex for Twickenham, Middlesex Residential-led mixed-use sustainable neighbourhoods on brownfield sites.
- Sustrans of Bristol for Bristol The National Cycle Network.
- Yell of Reading, Berkshire for Reading, Berkshire International directories including UK Yellow Pages.

== 2001 ==
The following organisations were awarded this year.

- B&Q of Eastleigh, Hampshire for QUEST (QUality, Ethics, SafeTy) programme.
- Bettys & Taylors Group of Harrogate, North Yorkshire for Holistic management of resources.
- Bovince of London E17 for Sustainability development programme.
- Buro Happold of Bath for Engineering sustainable buildings, with research and innovation reducing impact upon the built environment.
- Cooks' Delight of Berkhamsted, Hertfordshire for Organic food.
- Cotswold Water Park Society of Cirencester, Gloucestershire for Sustainable recreation and conservation.
- Greenbanks Country Hotel & Restaurant of Wendling, Norfolk for Exceptional facilities for disabled and able bodied to share.
- Kodak of Hemel Hempstead, for Hertfordshire Consistent improvement of environmental management system and procedures.
- Leeds Environmental Design Associates of Leeds for Sustainability in building design.
- The North of England Zoological Society of Chester for Chester Zoo revitalisation.
- Safeway of Hayes, Middlesex for Rail freight strategy.
- Scottish Power of Glasgow, Scotland for Gas reburn, cost effective NOx reduction technology.
- Southampton Geothermal Heating Company of Crawley, West Sussex for District energy network using combined heat and power and geothermal energy.
- Woking Borough Council of Woking, Surrey for Community energy systems.
- Yeo Valley Organic Company of Cannington, Somerset for Organic dairy supply chain.
