= Seachd: The Inaccessible Pinnacle =

- Film poster
- Directed by: Simon Miller
- Screenplay by: Simon Miller; Joanne Cockwell; Aonghas MacNeacail; Ian Finlay Macleod; Iseabail T NicDhòmhnaill
- Story by: Simon Miller; Joanne Cockwell
- Based on: Foighidinn: The Crimson Snowdrop by Simon Miller
- Produced by: Christopher Young
- Starring: Angus Peter Campbell; Patrick Morrison
- Cinematography: Ian Dodds
- Edited by: Aonghas MacAoidh
- Music by: Jim Sutherland
- Release date: 28 March 2007 (Celtic Film Festival)
- Running time: 90 minutes
- Country: United Kingdom
- Language: Scottish Gaelic

Seachd: The Inaccessible Pinnacle is a 2007 Scottish Gaelic-language Scottish fantasy drama film by first-time director, Simon Miller from a story by Simon Miller and Joanne Cockwell. It stars Patrick Morrison/Pàdruig Moireasdan and Gaelic magical realist poet and writer Angus Peter Campbell/Aonghas Pàdraig Chaimbeul in the role of the Grandfather. Toby Robertson, Meg Bateman, and Kathleen MacInnes also appear in supporting roles. It is the first contemporary film in the Scottish Gaelic language and was remade and expanded from a previous short film, Foighidinn: The Crimson Snowdrop, also directed by Miller.

Filming began in April 2006 around the Inaccessible Pinnacle at the top of Sgùrr Dearg in the Cuillin mountains on the Isle of Skye in the Hebrides of Scotland, and was completed in August 2006. The film screened at the Celtic Media Festival in March 2007, and made its world premiere at the 61st Edinburgh International Film Festival in August 2007.

The word seachd (Scottish Gaelic pronunciation: [ʃaxk]) in the title means "seven" and references the number of stories the grandfather originally told.

== Plot ==
When a young man, Angus, visits his dying grandfather, he is determined to find out the truth behind the death of his parents. He is frustrated by his grandfather's incredible stories. The stories are drawn from Gàidhealtachd history and rooted in Hebridean mythology and folklore about poisoned lovers, bloody revenge, water-horses and Spanish gold. His grandfather leads him to one of Scotland's most treacherous mountains, the Inaccessible Pinnacle on the Isle of Skye. Angus discovers that his grandfather is actually 700 years old and experienced the Jacobite risings, Highland Clearances, and the Education Acts. He also finds out the real origins of each of the seven stories.

== Cast ==
- Angus Peter Campbell/Aonghas Pàdraig Caimbeul as Grandfather
- Patrick Morrison/Pàdruig Moireasdan as Aonghas (aged 9)
- Coll Macdonald/Colla Dòmhnallach as Aonghas (aged 20)
- Dolina MacLennan as Grandmother
- David Walker/Daibhidh Walker as Archie
- Winnie Brook Young as Màiri
- Chris Macdonald/Crìsdean Dòmhnallach as Donnchadh
- Annie Macleod/Annie NicLeòid as Akira Gunn
- Calum MacFhionghain as The Magician
- Scott Handy as Patrick Loch
- Toby Robertson as The Duke of Sutherland
- Màrtainn Mac an t-Saoir as Akira's father
- Iain Macrae as Macdonald/An Dòmhnallach
- Vidal Sancho as The Spaniard
- Isabel NicRath as Sìleas
- Meg Bateman as Sìleas' mother
- Charles Quinnell/Tearlach Quinnell as Each Uisge/Water-horse
- Kathleen MacInnes/Kathleen NicAonghais as Catriona
- Eòghainn MacFhionghain as Calum
- Angus Macdonald/Aonghas MacDhòmhnaill as The Eldest Son/Am Mac Bu Shine
- Kathleen Macdonald/Kathleen NicDhòmhnaill as Ailsa Macleod/Eilis NicLeòid
- Iain "Seonachan" MacLeòid as Alec
- Aonghas Iain MacDhòmhnaill as Eòghainn
- Lachlan Graham as Neach-Leanmhainn
- Niall Caimbeul as Geàrrd/Neach-ciùil
- Coinneach MacEalair Saighdear
- Jim Sutherland as Neach-ciùil
- Marian Lloyd as Neach-ciùil
- Iseabail Strachan as Neach-ciùil
- Fiona NicAsgaill as Neach-ciùil

== BAFTA controversy ==
In the autumn of 2007, BAFTA refused to put the film, along with the Welsh-language film Calon Gaeth, forward as candidates for the Best Foreign Language Film Category at the 2008 Academy Awards. Christopher Young, the film's producer, claimed that the decision was "anti-Gaelic" and resigned his membership of BAFTA. The issue was raised in the Scottish Parliament.

== Production ==
The film received funding from the Gaelic Media Service, BBC Alba, the Glasgow Film Office and Scottish Screen. It had a budget of £655,000 ($1.3m) and was shot on the Isle of Skye in 2006.

== Reception ==
The film was nominated for 3 BAFTAs and Miller for the Michael Powell Award and was warmly received with comparisons drawn to works such as Big Fish (2003) and The Princess Bride (1987).
