= Abel & Cole =

British organic food company

Abel & Cole delivery van

Abel & Cole is a British organic food vegetable box delivery company.

== History ==
Abel & Cole was established in 1988 by barrister Keith Abel, who originally operated the business by selling potatoes door-to-door. The company subsequently evolved to offer organic grocery subscription box services.

In 2012, it was acquired by William Jackson Food Group, based in Hessle, East Riding of Yorkshire.

== Awards and recognition ==
In 2005, Abel & Cole received a Queen's Award for Enterprise. In 2014 and 2015, the company was awarded Great Taste Awards by the Guild of Fine Food for several product offerings.

Abel & Cole vegetable box
