= Beamly =

Software company in New York

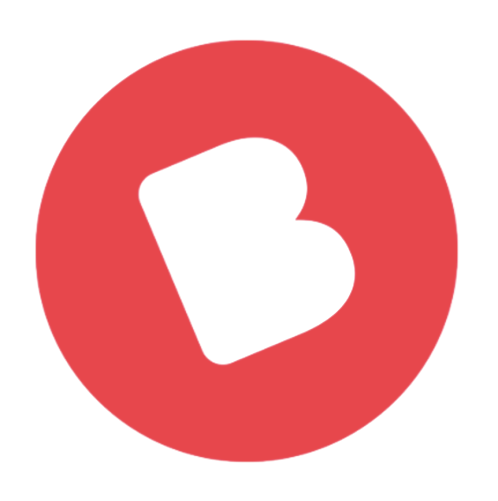
- Type: Private
- Industry: Advertising and marketing
- Founded: 2019; 7 years ago
- Headquarters: New York
- Website: www.beamly.com

Beamly is a creator platform that enables podcasters, video creators, writers and educators to publish and monetize audio, video and text content. The company rebranded from Podcastpage.io in October 2025 to reflect broader functionality beyond podcast websites.

== History ==
Beamly originated as Podcastpage.io, launched in 2019 to help podcasters build and manage websites. In October 2025, the company adopted the Beamly name and expanded positioning to a multi‑format creator platform.

== Features ==
The platform offers:

- multi‑format publishing for podcasts, videos, and written content;
- membership and paywalled content options, as well as digital product sales (the company states it charges 0% platform fees);
- custom domains and site building tools;
- workflow automation for imports, transcripts and publishing.

== Legacy use of the name ==
Beamly was a social platform based in London, UK and New York City, United States. The company was founded in April 2011 as tBone TV, later renamed to Zeebox, by Ernesto Schmitt and Anthony Rose. It was started as a social discovery and engagement platform with 2nd-screen TV, creating the concept of social television.

Beamly, then called Zeebox, aimed to provide the optimal platform for connected television, making it a social and interactive viewing experience rather than the standard television viewing format. The platform allowed users to follow and interact with their favourite TV shows, as well as play games and take part in polls. It expanded to the US in September 2012 and into Australia in November.

Beamly took on funding from BSkyb, Comcast, NBCUniversal, Viacom and HBO. Its first round valued it at above US$150M. It was sold to the New York Stock Exchange listed S&P 500 component Coty, Inc. in 2015 for an undisclosed sum.

Zeebox was founded in April 2011 as tBone TV Limited by Anthony Rose, the ex-CTO of the BBC iPlayer, and Ernesto Schmitt, entrepreneur and ex-Board Director of EMI Music. The founding team also included Simon Miller (CTO), Max Bleyleben (COO), and Alex Nunes. The company was renamed to "Zeebox" in August 2011 prior to its public launch in November of that year. It launched in IOS in December.

Zeebox original logo

Zeebox aimed to provide the optimal platform for connected television, making it a social and interactive viewing experience rather than the standard television viewing format. At first glance, the showed the user what's currently on TV (taking in all the Freeview channels and some premium Sky and Virgin Media ones too), as well as displaying upcoming programmes.

Through connecting Zeebox to the user's Facebook account, the service let the user pick what they were watching, as well as see what their Zeebox-using Facebook friends were watching, invite them to watch something "with" the user, instant message them or hide what you're watching with them. Smart TV integration made use of the iPad app as a remote control.

In August 2012, it was announced that Zeebox would be expanding to the United States. It launched that September on IOS and Android. It launched with strategic investments from Comcast, as well as from NBC Universal. The startup also partnered with HBO to provide customised experiences around its own HBO original shows. For Comcast customers, the Zeebox app was available as a universal remote control, allowing users to quickly switch over to shows that they discover in the app. Zeebox contained enhanced pages for 307 shows across 28 different NBC Universal networks.

The Zeebox homepage from 2013

Zeebox had extensive advertising campaigns including Jordan Klepper; many of which poked fun at "TV giants". Featuring three 30 second TV ads, the campaigns featured Zeebox as TV's new sidekick, with TV sulking because ‘little brother’ zeebox is getting all the attention.

The company had 2 million active users by 2014, when it relaunched its website and iOS and Android apps on 14 April as Beamly, using further features that aimed to get people logging in throughout the day to chat about their favourite shows.

The Beamly platform encouraged people to "follow" individual TV shows, celebrities and other Beamly users, before serving them up a feed of activity and show recommendations. Shows each had their own "TV rooms" within the app where fans can chat throughout the day, and interact live with games, polls and other features when they're on air. The relaunch was also an attempt to respond to shifting TV habits, as people watch more shows on-demand, including from providers like Netflix as well as traditional broadcasters.

In the 12 months from its relaunch in 2014, Beamly went from 2 million active users to over 10 million. Trials lifted audience engagement by 72 per cent month on month. Usage data showed that Beamly helped turn fans into super users, who on average visited the platform for more than 500 minutes and 21 times per week. In 2012, the app was opened about 27 times each month per user in the U.K., with each session lasting somewhere between 20 and 30 minutes apiece.

During this time, Beamly was surpassing television chatting figures on sites such as Twitter.

In January 2012, BSkyB bought a 10% stake in Zeebox and announced plans to integrate the software with its offering. This stake was reportedly worth upwards of $15M, valuing the company at over $150M. In September 2012, Zeebox announced expansion into the US with a commercial partnership with Comcast Cable, NBCUniversal, Viacom and HBO. Viacom took a stake in October 2012, as well as Comcast and NBC Universal in September 2012.

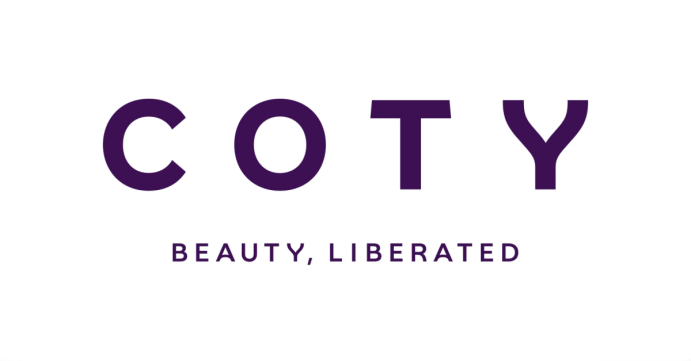
Coty's Logo

In October 2015, Beamly was acquired by COTY for an undisclosed amount. Through this acquisition, Beamly – now headed by Jason Forbes, evolved into a digital marketing and technology business with gross revenues exceeding $120M and a global team of over 180.

In October 2016, Coty, Inc. acquired $12.5B of Procter & Gamble's beauty brands, making it the largest fragrance manufacturer in the world. Coty used Beamly's technology to accelerate growth of its eCommerce business, while emerging as a digital beauty brand. In December 2019 it was announced that Coty was overhauling Beamly, with the possibility of dissolving the company.

The company has won the following awards:

- "App of the year" at the T3 Gadget Awards, 2012
- "The companion screen prize" at the Connected TV Awards, 2012
- "Overall Winner" at the Connected TV Awards, 2012
- Netexplo award winner 2012
- "Most Innovative Design Or User Interface" 1TVT Awards 2012
- "Best iPad app of 2012" Mashable, 2012
- Number 5 in the top 50 best iPhone apps, Time, 2013
- "Best Social Mobile or Apps startup" The Europas, 2013
- "Lovie Award Winner / Entertainment: Tablet" The Lovie Awards, 2013
- "Award for Technical Innovation" The DADI Awards, 2019

In 2012, Zeebox was named amongst the Startups 100.
