= Delia Smith =

English cook and television presenter (born 1941)

Delia Smith CH CBE
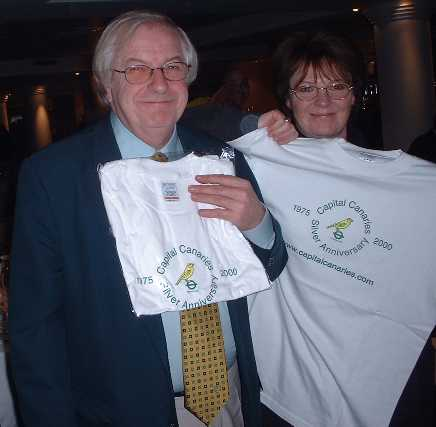
- Smith (right) with her husband
- Born: Delia Ann Smith; 18 June 1941 (age 85); Woking, Surrey, England
- Occupations: Cook; television presenter
- Spouse: Michael Wynn-Jones (m. 1971; died 2026)
- Website: deliaonline.com

Delia Ann Smith CH CBE (born 18 June 1941) is an English cook and television presenter, known for teaching basic cookery skills in a direct style. One of the best-known celebrity chefs in British popular culture, Smith has influenced viewers to become more culinarily adventurous. She is also notable for her role as Honorary Life President (with her husband Michael Wynn-Jones) of Norwich City, where she was previously the Joint Majority Shareholder alongside Wynn-Jones from 1998 to 2024.

== Early life ==
Delia Smith was born to Harold Bartlett Smith (1920–1999), an English RAF radio operator and tool salesman, and a Welsh mother, Etty Jones Lewis (1919–2020); in Woking, Surrey, her parents divorced when she was 15 years old and her brother was aged seven.

Smith attended Bexleyheath School, leaving at the age of 16 without any qualifications. Her first job was as a hairdresser; she also worked as a shop assistant and in a travel agency.

== Cookery career ==
In 1962, at the age of 21, Smith started work in a small restaurant in Paddington, washing dishes before moving on to waitressing, then helping with the cooking. She began reading English cookery books in the Reading Room at the British Museum, trying out the recipes on a Harley Street family with whom she was living. Her next job was at Carlton Studios in London, where she prepared food for studio photography.

In 1969, Smith was taken on as the cookery writer for the Daily Mirror's newly launched magazine. Their deputy editor was Michael Wynn-Jones, whom she later married. Her first piece featured kipper pâté, beef in beer and cheesecake. She baked the cake that was used on the cover of The Rolling Stones' album Let It Bleed, which she later recalled was in response to a request that was for "a gaudy cake" that had to look "really horrible". In 1972 Smith started a column in the Evening Standard. She later defected to the rival Evening News, but she returned to the Standard when that newspaper bought out the News. She wrote for both for 12 years; later she wrote a column for the Radio Times until 1986.

Smith's first television appearances came in the early 1970s, and when she moved to East Anglia she became the resident cook on BBC East's regional magazine programme Look East, shown on BBC One across the region. Following this, she was offered her own cookery television show, Family Fare, which ran from 1973 to 1975.

Smith became a recognisable figure amongst young people in the 1970s and early 1980s when she was an occasional guest on the BBC's Saturday morning children's programme Multicoloured Swap Shop, giving basic cooking demonstrations.

In Taiwan, Smith was compared to Taiwanese chef Fu Pei-mei, and she was called the "Fu Pei-mei of England".

Her 1995 book Delia Smith's The Winter Collection sold 2 million copies in hardback, becoming the fifth biggest-selling book of the 1990s.

In 2003, Smith announced her retirement from television. However, she returned for an eponymous six-part series airing on the BBC in Spring 2008. The accompanying book, an update of her 1971 best-seller How to Cheat at Cooking, was published in February 2008, again becoming a best-seller.

In 2010, she appeared in a five-episode series, Delia through the Decades, with each episode exploring a new decade of her cooking. Also in 2010, Smith and Heston Blumenthal were signed up to appear in a series of 40 commercials on British television for the supermarket chain Waitrose.

In February 2013, she announced that she had retired from television cookery programmes, and would concentrate on offering her recipes online.

Smith has twice been the guest for BBC Radio 4's Desert Island Discs: first on 5 June 1982, when her choices included "The Sound of Silence" by Paul Simon and "Llef" by Rhos Male Voice Choir, and again on Christmas Eve 2023, when her choices included "This Woman's Work" by Kate Bush and "Happy" by Pharrell Williams.

In October 2026, Smith's book of essays Us: Nine Ingredients to Change Our World was published by Canongate.

== The "Delia effect" ==
It has been claimed that Smith's television series Delia's How to Cook led to a 10% rise in egg sales in Britain and her use of ingredients such as frozen mash and tinned minced beef and onions, or utensils such as an omelette pan, could cause sell-outs overnight. This phenomenon, dubbed the "Delia effect", was most recently seen in 2008, after her book How to Cheat at Cooking was published. Her fame (and her relatively uncommon name) has meant that her first name has become sufficient to identify her to the public and the "Delia effect" has become a commonly used phrase to describe a run on a previously poor-selling product as a result of a high-profile recommendation.

== Business interests ==
From 1993 to 1998, Smith worked as a consultant for Sainsbury's. In May 1993 she and her husband Michael Wynn-Jones launched New Crane Publishing to publish Sainsbury's Magazine; the company also published several of Smith's books for BBC Worldwide. Although Smith and Wynn-Jones sold New Crane Publishing in 2005, Smith continues to be a consultant for Seven Publishing which now publishes the magazine.

=== Football ===
In the 2023 episode of Desert Island Discs, hosted by Lauren Lavern, Smith said her husband Michael Wynn-Jones introduced her to the "beautiful" game of football.

Smith has developed other business interests outside of her culinary ventures, notably a majority shareholding of 53% in the football team Norwich City, with her husband. Both Smith and Wynn-Jones were season ticket holders at Norwich and were invited to invest in the club, which had fallen on hard times. She has had a significant impact on improving matchday catering standards and food revenues, only stepping back from day-to-day responsibilities on reaching the age of 70.

In February 2005, Smith attracted attention during the half-time break of a home match against Manchester City. At the time Norwich were fighting an ultimately unsuccessful battle against relegation from the Premier League, and to rally the crowd, Smith grabbed the microphone from the club announcer on the pitch and said: "A message for the best football supporters in the world: we need a 12th man here. Where are you? Where are you? Let's be 'avin' you! Come on!" Norwich lost the match 3–2. Smith denied suggestions in the media that she had been drunk while delivering the speech though she did concede that "maybe in the heat of the moment I didn't choose the best words".

In 2008, it was reported that Smith had rejected an offer from Norfolk-born billionaire Peter Cullum, who wished to invest £20 million in the club, but wanted Smith and the other shareholders to relinquish their holdings. Both Smith and Cullum denied this offer had been made, with Smith telling the football club's AGM that she and her husband would be "very happy to stand aside" as majority shareholders if someone came along with an offer to buy them out.

In August 2011, Smith announced that, anticipating her 70th birthday, she was stepping down from her catering role at Norwich City's Carrow Road football ground: "It is now time for a fresh approach and a younger team who, I am confident, will take the business even further."

Smith and Wynn-Jones's 28 years of involvement with Norwich City came to an end on 23 October 2024, when the club's other shareholders approved a deal that allowed Norfolk Holdings, a business group led by the American businessman Mark Attanasio that previously purchased a 40.4% stake in the club in April 2024, to increase their stake in the club to 85% and take majority control, with Smith and Wynn-Jones's shares decreasing to 10%. As part of the deal, Smith and Wynn-Jones also agreed to stand down from their roles as club directors and become honorary life presidents of the club.

== Honours and awards ==
Already an Officer of the Order of the British Empire (OBE), Smith was appointed Commander of the Order of the British Empire (CBE) in the 2009 Birthday Honours, "in recognition of ... [her] contribution to television cookery and recipe writing".

In 1996, Smith was awarded an honorary degree by the University of Nottingham, a fellowship from St Mary's University College (a college of the University of Surrey) and a Fellowship from the Royal Television Society. In 1999, she received an honorary degree from the University of East Anglia and in 2000, a fellowship from Liverpool John Moores University.

In 2012, Smith was among the British cultural icons selected by artist Sir Peter Blake to appear in a new version of his most famous artwork – the Beatles' Sgt. Pepper's Lonely Hearts Club Band album cover – to celebrate the British cultural figures of the last six decades.

She was appointed Member of the Order of the Companions of Honour (CH) in the 2017 Birthday Honours for services to cookery.

== Personal life ==
Smith was baptised in the Church of England, and attended a Methodist Sunday School, a Congregationalist Brownie group and later a Church of England youth group. At the age of 22, she converted to Catholicism. Her first two short religious books, A Feast for Lent (1983) and A Feast for Advent (1983), are readings and reflections for these seasons. In 1988, she wrote a longer book on prayer, A Journey into God.

Smith became friends with the Catholic art historian Sister Wendy Beckett, selecting Beckett's book, 100 Best-loved Paintings, in her second appearance on Desert Island Discs broadcast in December 2023, four decades apart from her first invitation, in 1982.

In 2012, Smith criticised atheism, stating that "militant neo-atheists and devout secularists are busting a gut to drive us [religious people] off the radar and try to convince us that we hardly exist."

== Publications ==
=== Cookery books ===
- How to Cheat at Cooking (Ebury Press, 1971)
- Family Fare (BBC Books, 1973)
- Recipes from Country Inns and Restaurants (Ebury Press, 1973)
- The Evening Standard Cookbook (Thames & Hudson, 1974)
- Country Recipes from Look East (BBC Books, 1975)
- More Country Recipes: A Second Collection from Look East (1976)
- Frugal Food (1976) (Re-issued in October 2008)
- Cakes, Bakes & Steaks (1977)
- Delia Smith's Book of Cakes (1977)
- Delia Smith's Cookery Course (3 volumes: 1978, 1979 & 1980)
- One is Fun (1986)
- Complete Illustrated Cookery Course (1989) (ISBN 0-563-21454-6)
- Delia Smith's Christmas (1990)
- Delia Smith's Summer Collection (1993)
- Delia Smith's Winter Collection (1995) (winner of the 1996 British Book of the Year award).
- Delia's How to Cook—Book 1 (1998) (based on the television series)
- Delia's How to Cook—Book 2 (1999)
- Delia's How to Cook—Book 3 (2001)
- The Delia Collection (2003) (several themed volumes)
- Delia's Kitchen Garden: A Beginners' Guide to Growing and Cooking Fruit and Vegetables (2004)
- The Delia Collection – Puddings (2006)
- Delia's Kitchen Garden (February 2007) (BBC Books – ISBN 978-0-563-49373-0)
- How to Cheat at Cooking (February 2008) (Ebury Press – ISBN 978-0-09-192229-0)
- Delia's Happy Christmas (October 2009)

=== Religious and spiritual works ===
- A Feast for Advent (Twenty-Third Publications, 1983)
- A Feast for Lent (Bible Reading Fellowship, 1983)
- A Journey into Prayer (Catholic Truth Society, 1986)
- A Journey into God (Harper & Row, 1988)
- You Matter: The Human Solution (Mensch Publishing, 2022)
