= Iglo =

Frozen food brand

- Product type: Frozen food
- Current owner: Nomad Foods
- Country: United Kingdom
- Related brands: Birds Eye; Findus
- Markets: 15 countries
- Previous owners: Unilever; Permira

Iglo is a frozen food brand based in the United Kingdom, with products sold across the European continent. It is owned by Nomad Foods Europe, which also owns the rights to the Birds Eye brand in the United Kingdom and Ireland, and Findus across Europe.

Formerly owned by private equity firm Permira, the company was sold to the food company Nomad Foods in June 2015, valuing the group at €2.6bn (£1.9bn). Nomad purchased the operations of Findus in all markets except the United Kingdom in November 2015, and merged the businesses of Iglo and Findus in 2016 to form Nomad Foods Europe.

== History ==
In November 2006, private equity fund Permira acquired the BirdsEye and Iglo businesses from Unilever for €1.7bn, forming the BirdsEye Iglo Group. In 2010 BirdsEye Iglo Group purchased the Italian frozen food business Compagnia Surgelati Italiana SPA from Unilever for €0.8bn, and reunited the Findus brand in Sweden into the group that had previously been managed as one business under Unilever until 2006. On 24 June 2011, BirdsEye Iglo Group changed its legal name to Iglo Foods Group Limited, and began trading as the Iglo Group.

Blackstone Group and BC Partners made an unsuccessful bid of €2.5bn to buy Iglo from Permira in 2012. In April 2015 Permira agreed on a majority sale to United States-based investment vehicle Nomad Foods, valuing the group at €2.6bn (£1.9bn).

Following the purchase of Findus by Iglo's parent Nomad Foods, the Findus brand is due to be brought back under the same ownership across Europe.

Iglo shut down their operations in France and absorbed it to Findus in 2016.

== See also ==
- List of frozen food brands
