= PeopleSound =

British audio streaming platform

- PeopleSound running in 2000
- Website type: Public (Limited)
- Traded as: NYSE: DCM
- Founded: June 1999; 27 years ago
- Dissolved: 2008
- Country of origin: Great Britain
- No. of locations: 6 locations (peak)
- Owner: Vitaminic
- Founder: Ernesto Schmitt
- Industry: Audio streaming
- Employees: 85 (2000)
- Website: peoplesound.com (archived)
- Launched: October 1999

PeopleSound was a British audio streaming platform founded on 22 June 1999 by Ernesto Schmitt. Going live in October 1999, it was the first European music streaming platform and the most visited. At peak, it was amongst the top ten most-visited entertainment websites in Europe, with millions of registered users, and one of the highest profile new-age internet startups.

PeopleSound combined new media reach with old media music publishing to create a platform where users could search for music by artist or category and discover new recommended music. Unlike music distribution before, which had been managed exclusively by record labels, PeopleSound signed unsigned artists, notably offering £100 to artists per song they sent in. These artists earned 50 per cent royalties on physical copies sold, but music on the site was available free.

With offices in London, Paris and Munich, PeopleSound raised at a valuation of $200 million (£70m in 1999) and reached a valuation of $280 million (£100m in 1999). Post dot-com bubble, PeopleSound was sold to Vitaminic, and the combined entity was listed on the Italian Stock Exchange. The New York Times called PeopleSound "the leader for European-based downloadable music sites", as well as the first pioneer of music streaming on mobile, and it set the basis for later companies like Spotify and Apple Music.

== History ==
PeopleSound was founded in June 1999 in London by 28-year-old Ernesto Schmitt as a new format for online music distribution. Schmitt had been a Boston Consulting Group Management Consultant but had no music industry experience. The platform was built on the premise that technology could help consumers discover music and that an entire new generation of artists needed new channels to be distributed through. It aimed to "topple the monopoly of major music companies [and] revolutionise the way new bands are signed and listened to".

The early team included Bruno Heese; Martin Turner, formerly head of CompuServe UK; and Paul Levett. In September 1999, pre-launch, PeopleSound was valued at £12 million and had 35 employees and 400–500 scouts. Early backers included Bernard Arnault's global Europe@web Internet Fund, which had also invested in MP3.com. By October of the same year, the platform was valued at £20 million.

=== Early expansion ===
By Autumn 1999, Schmitt told the BBC that PeopleSound aimed to "start in the UK and then rapidly setting up subsidiaries in Germany, France, Italy, Spain, the Benelux countries and even Turkey". Aided by grassroots marketing, they had 150 people finding bands across the country.

Quickly becoming a favorite of the dot-com boom, on 29 May 2000, PeopleSound announced a round of funding valuing it in excess of £70 million ($200m in 2022). Investors included Finnish wireless communications operator Sonera Corporation, who took an 8 per cent stake; Ladybird Ventures; and Zouk Ventures, taking a further 2.4 per cent. Under the deal, PeopleSound exclusively became the free music provider for Zed, Sonera's global wireless portal. This integration was the first example of music downloads straight to mobile. Schmitt was quoted as saying "the deal will allow music downloads straight to mobile handsets, enabling music lovers to have their favourite music wherever they go".

=== Explosive growth ===
Having positioned itself successfully, by July 2000, the New York Times noted PeopleSound.com was the most popular music platform in Europe, and led European based Internet sites for downloadable music, still "in its infancy". It had sites in English, German, Dutch, Spanish and Italian, and ranked in the top ten most popular entertainment sites and as one of the highest-profile tech startups in the UK; Les Echos named Schmitt "one of the elite figures of the London Net-economy", while ZDNet declared him "one of the UK's better known Web entrepreneurs". It was widely expected to float that summer, reaching a valuation of £100 million. Had an IPO gone to plan, it was expected that "even the most junior staff who joined when the company started last year could each make $5 million. Staff joining today would still have made about $160,000 from their share options", and "100 millionaires could be created". Martin Turner, COO, noted that they'd only make inroads into the US after going public, due to the cost of market entry.

By October 2000, the site represented more than 10,000 unsigned bands and artists, holding the master and recording rights to their music, and had over 1.5 million registered users. The company was also named among "The UK's Most Visionary Companies" in 2001 by Management Today.

=== Other developments ===
==== Joint partnerships ====
PeopleSound first partnered with MTV, becoming jointly branded with MTV in "several hundred thousand pounds worth" of advertising for the V2000 music festival in August 2000. In November 2000, the platform secured distribution deals with Amazon, AltaVista, LineOne, Liberty Surf and intermusic. The deal with Amazon allowed their users to purchase music direct from PeopleSound artists and allowed the platform to scale up their audience.

By September 2000, recording company EMI announced a wide-ranging partnership with PeopleSound. The deal was the first European collaboration of new media and old media and allowed PeopleSound to tap into EMI's global administration for its own artists, sharing ownership of its most popular artists with EMI, and splitting royalties.

==== Music licensing portal ====
In October 2000, PeopleSound launched a service for marketers to discover and license music for TV, digital and offline advertising. The platform aimed to license music at a quarter the cost and take a fraction of the time the process would usually take, and announced plans to launch a tool to find similar sounding music. Before launching the product, the company was in talks with Microsoft, Casio, Virgin and Smirnoff Vodka. Business director Simon Miller noted "ninety per cent of ads want music that fits the brief, which is where we're targeting".

=== Bubble boom ===
The NASDAQ Composite index spiked in the late 1990s and then fell sharply as a result of the dot-com bubble.

By June 2001, with tough economic conditions, PeopleSound, with 85 employees, was in merger talks with Vitaminic. The pan-European digital music company, listed on Milan's Nuovo Mercato stock exchange, was interested in PeopleSound, which had nearly sold to Terra Lycos earlier in the year. On 11 June, it was announced Vitaminic was buying PeopleSound for 34 million euros in cash. The deal made the joint entity one of the top three largest music platforms on the web and left PeopleSound shareholders with a 19 per cent stake in Vitaminic, the company being one of few post-bubble exits. The deal had sceptics, with Les Echos noting that it was "an unattractive company (Vitaminic) buying a really great company (PeopleSound)"; PeopleSound founder Schmitt told the BBC the deal would "reshape the traditional music industry".

The combined acquisition joined archrivals and gave the company a combined catalogue of more than 329,000 tracks and agreements with over 1,200 record labels, with Schmitt telling The Guardian, "Vitaminic is very strong in southern Europe and the US and on the subscriptions side of things we're very strong in northern Europe". The combined entity was listed on Milan's Nuovo Mercato stock exchange. By August 2001, and following the internet bubble boom of mid-2000, Schmitt quit to take up a senior role for EMI in New York.

== Business model ==
PeopleSound operated under a freemium model, under which music on the site was free but artists could opt to sell physical copies. The website allowed artists to send their finished product to PeopleSound and then granted them a non-exclusive world-wide licence for £100. At the time, this promotion received significant coverage. In exchange, artists were given a page on the PeopleSound website, and were free to choose a price to sell their music. These artists earned 50 per cent royalties – the market average was 17–20 per cent – on physical copies sold, but music on the site was available free.

PeopleSound was said to only reject 20 per cent of the music offered to them, aiming to create a democratised music platform, and offered customers two free songs from every band. It aimed to differentiate itself by filtering out poor quality artist submissions, and both it and MP3.com were seen as good examples of 're-intermediating' companies, combining elements of both traditional retail and record companies functions.

== Later history ==
In 2004, it was understood that PeopleSound.com was set to be relaunched, and the site had begun operating on a limited basis. Sources said the launch would reposition PeopleSound as an advertising-funded community web site for labels and other content providers. Although the domain name for the relaunched PeopleSound kept being renewed until the end of 2008, the site itself stopped received updates in 2006, with the most recent release listed on their site being Billy Bragg's Volume 1 (2006) box set.
