= Nomad Foods =

American-British food manufacturer

Nomad Foods Limited
- Type: Limited
- Traded as: NYSE: NOMD
- Industry: Foods
- Founded: 1 June 2015
- Founder: Noam Gottesman; Martin E. Franklin
- Headquarters: Forge, 43 Church Street West, Woking, Surrey, GU21 6HT (Address of Principal Executive Offices); British Virgin Islands (Jurisdiction of Incorporation)
- Area served: Europe
- Key people: Dominic Brisby (CEO)
- Revenue: ▼EUR 3.032 billion (2025)
- Operating income: ▼EUR 325 million (2025)
- Net income: ▼EUR 136 million (2025)
- Total assets: ▼EUR 6.335 billion (2025)
- Total equity: ▼EUR 2.496 billion (2025)
- Number of employees: 7,752 (2025)
- Subsidiaries: Birds Eye (Europe); Iglo; Findus; Frikom; Ledo; Aunt Bessie's; Goodfella's; La Cocinera (Spain); Belviva (Belgium)
- Website: nomadfoods.com

Nomad Foods is the largest frozen food company in Europe, whose popular brands include Birds Eye, Ledo, Iglo, Findus, and Frikom. The company manufactures, sells and distributes a range of frozen food products across 22 European markets, with its headquarters in the United Kingdom. The most popular products in Nomad Foods’ portfolio include fish fingers, creamed spinach, peas and chicken. Nomad Foods is listed on the New York Stock Exchange trading under the ticker “NOMD”.

== History ==
=== Origin ===
Nomad Foods was founded as Nomad Holdings on 1 April 2014 by Noam Gottesman and Martin E. Franklin.

On 20 April 2015, Nomad Holdings announced it would acquire the Iglo Group (with its brands Iglo, Birds Eye and Findus Italy) from private equity firm Permira for €2.6 billion. The acquisition was completed on 1 July 2015, and Nomad Holdings renamed itself to Nomad Foods. Permira retained a minority stake in the company.

Nomad Foods subsequently expanded its European footprint by acquiring Findus Group's continental European business in November 2015 for approximately €500 million.

=== Strategic growth and acquisitions ===
Following its listing move from the London Stock Exchange to the New York Stock Exchange in January 2016, Nomad Foods entered a period of sustained expansion and commercial success. This performance was driven by a combination of organic growth initiatives - such as portfolio renovation, innovation, and sustainability leadership - and strategic acquisitions that broadened its geographic footprint and product range.

In April 2018, Nomad Foods acquired Goodfella's from 2 Sisters Food Group, for €225 million, strengthening its presence in the UK and Ireland. Two months later, in June 2018, it completed its acquisition of Aunt Bessie's Limited from William Jackson & Son Limited, for approximately €240 million., adding iconic British meal accompaniments to its portfolio.

Nomad Foods continued its expansion in November 2020, announcing the acquisition of Findus Switzerland from Froneri International Limited. The acquisition was completed in January 2021 for a purchase price of approximately €110 million. The transaction unified Nomad Foods' ownership of the Findus brand across Europe.

Shortly thereafter, in January 2021, Nomad Foods went into exclusive talks with Fortenova Group over their frozen food business, which includes Ledo Plus (Croatia), Ledo Čitluk (Bosnia & Herzegovina) and Frikom (Serbia). The acquisition closed in September 2021 for approximately €615 million, making it one of the largest deals in Nomad Foods' history.

== Brands ==
Nomad Foods' brand portfolio is anchored by five brands:

=== Birds Eye ===
A major frozen food brand in the UK and Ireland. Founded by Clarence Birdseye, the inventor of modern frozen food technology, in 1922. In June 1938, Frosted Foods was formed to bring the Birds Eye Frozen Foods brand to the UK. Unilever acquired the brand and owned it from 1943 until 2006, when it was sold to Permira as part of the Iglo Group. Birds Eye has been part of Nomad Foods since 2015.

=== Iglo ===
A brand in Germany, Austria, the Netherlands, Belgium, and Portugal, famous for products like Captain Iglo fish fingers and ‘Blubb’ spinach. Originally launched in Belgium in 1956, expanding to the Netherlands and Germany in the early 1960s. As with Birds Eye, Permira acquired the Iglo business from Unilever in 2006, and sold the group to Nomad Foods at a value of €2.6bn in 2015.

=== Findus ===
Established in 1945, known for innovation in frozen meals and strong presence in Scandinavia and Southern Europe. Founded as Skånska Fruktvin Likörfabriken in Sweden in 1903. The company was renamed Findus in 1941 and began producing frozen food products in 1945. Findus was acquired by Nestlé in 1962. In 1963, Nestlé and Unilever formed a joint venture in Italy under the Findus name, with Unilever acquiring Nestlé’s stake in 1985, giving it full ownership of the Findus brand in Italy.

=== Frikom ===
A frozen food brand in Serbia and neighbouring countries. It offers a wide variety of frozen goods including vegetables, pastries, pizzas, and ice cream. Previously owned by Fortenova Group, Frikom has a strong distribution network and brand loyalty in the Western Balkans.

=== Ledo ===
A brand in Croatia and the broader Balkan region. It is known for its extensive range of frozen vegetables, ready meals, and especially ice cream products. Ledo was acquired by Nomad Foods from Fortenova Group. Ledo produced the first ice cream in Croatia, the popular Snjeguljica (Snow White).

The company holds an estimated 15% market share in Western Europe’s €26.3 billion savoury frozen food market, more than double that of its nearest competitor.

As well as these anchor brands, Nomad Foods’ portfolio also includes a number of local brands:

=== Aunt Bessie's ===
A UK producer of frozen Yorkshire puddings, potatoes, vegetables and desserts. The brand originated in 1974 when Tryton Foods (part of the William Jackson Food Group) began supplying Yorkshire puddings to Butlin's holiday camps, later launching as the Aunt Bessie’s brand in 1995. Its portfolio grew rapidly – roast potatoes were introduced in 1999, and by the early 2010s it was recognised among the UK’s top 100 brands by The Grocer. Nomad Foods acquired the Aunt Bessie’s business from William Jackson in 2018.

=== Belviva ===
A sub-brand of iglo Belgium, Belviva produces a range of fries and frozen potato specialties. Belviva was previously known as Lutosa, but in 2019 was legally required to rebrand after its trademark and production units were sold separately. The name Belviva was chosen to reflect its Belgian heritage (“Bel”) and joyful celebration (“viva”).

=== Goodfella's ===
Goodfella’s pizza is an Italian-American style frozen pizza brand based in Ireland, founded by Green Isle Foods Ltd in 1993 and introduced in the UK market in 1995. Best known for its popular stone-baked thin crust pizzas and takeaway range, Goodfella’s also offers gluten-free and vegan options. The brand operates two production sites in Longford and Naas. In April 2018, Nomad Foods acquired Goodfella’s from 2 Sisters Food Group for approximately £200–225 million.

=== La Cocinera ===
La Cocinera is a ready-meal brand that one of the most well known brands in the Spanish frozen food aisle. Founded in 1960 in Navarra, Spain, La Cocinera introduced its first frozen meal products in 1962, becoming a pioneer in the Spanish frozen food market. In January 2015, Nestlé Spain sold the business to Findus Spain, which later became part of the Nomad Foods portfolio. The brand’s production facility in Valladolid continues to play a key role in its operations.

== Innovation and sustainability ==
Nomad Foods focuses on the development of frozen fish, vegetables, and ready meals, alongside marketing and investment efforts to increase profits.

Along with this organic growth, Nomad Foods has focused on innovation and sustainability:

- Since 2017, Nomad Foods has shared annual sustainability reports, highlighting its progress against sustainable commitments.
- In September 2020, Nomad joined the “10x20x30” initiative to root out food loss and waste from its supply chain. 10x20x30 includes signatories from more than ten of the world’s biggest food retailers and manufacturers, with each having committed to engage in a “whole supply chain” approach to halving food loss and waste by 2030.
- In November 2021, Nomad Foods was included in the Dow Jones Sustainability Index for the first time.
- In June 2024, the results of an eighteen-month study with Campden BRI revealed that an increase in frozen food storage temperatures from the industry standard -18 ^{o}C to -15°C can reduce freezer energy consumption by 10-11%, without any noticeable impact on the safety of a product. Nomad Foods was the first food manufacturer to sign up to Move to -15^{o}C, an industry coalition launched at COP28 and dedicated to cutting carbon emissions in the frozen food supply chain.
- In June 2025, the company launched its “Future Foods Lab”, a venture clienting initiative designed to explore market-ready solutions from startups to address key business challenges. The first open innovation challenge focused on functional nutrition.
- In August 2025, Nomad Foods released their eighth annual sustainability report under their Appetite for a Better World strategy. The company’s sustainability activity is driven by the three core pillars of this strategy:
  - Better Sourcing: Improving the sustainability of the ingredients that go into their brands’ products.
  - Better Nutrition: Making food that is nutritious and lower impact.
  - Better Operations: Producing their brands in a way that respects employees, the wider community and the planet.
- In September 2025, the Science Based Targets initiative (SBTi) validated Nomad Foods’ net-zero ambitions, including the aim of achieving net-zero greenhouse has emissions across its operations and supply chain by 2050.
- In September 2025, Nomad Foods unveiled their “Get Real” Protein bowls under the Birds Eye and iglo brands in Belgium and the Netherlands. These products mark the company’s first venture into the functional nutrition space, delivering high-protein and high-fibre ready meals inspired by global cuisine.

== Leadership ==
In October 2025, Nomad Foods announced the appointment of Dominic Brisby as Executive President, CEO-Elect, and Member of the Board of Directors, effective November 3, 2025. Brisby officially assumed the CEO role on 1 January 2026, succeeding Stéfan Descheemaeker, who served as CEO from 2015 to 2025.
