= Simon David Miller =

- Born: England
- Education: London Film School, London School of Economics
- Occupations: Film writer, director, producer and media tech company founder
- Years active: 2002–present (Film)
- Spouse: Jo Cockwell

Simon David Miller is a British film writer, director, producer and investor, having also co-founded several technology media companies. His debut feature, the Scottish Gaelic feature film, Seachd: The Inaccessible Pinnacle, was nominated for 3 BAFTAs. He later founded the New Forest Film Festival.

Miller has been involved in several technology startups, including PeopleSound, the first music streaming platform, SWOPEX, an online film, music and game exchange, and second-screen pioneer Beamly.

== Filmography ==
=== Feature films ===
Miller's debut feature, the Scottish Gaelic feature film, Seachd: The Inaccessible Pinnacle, was released in 2007. The film was nominated for 3 BAFTAs and Miller for the Michael Powell Award. It was warmly received with comparisons drawn to works such as Big Fish and The Princess Bride, and it was the first feature film in Scottish Gaelic to gain theatrical release.

The film was written in collaboration with Jo Cockwell and several Scottish Gaelic writers and poets, including Angus Peter Campbell, Aonghas MacNeacail and Iain Finlay Macleod.

In 2007 as the film prepared for its UK premiere in the Highlands, controversy arose as BAFTA refused to put forward Seachd as a candidate for Best Foreign Language Film Category at the 2008 Academy Awards. The ensuing controversy led to widespread coverage in the national and international press and the film's producer Christopher Young resigning his membership of BAFTA.

=== Short films ===
The short film, Foighidinn – The Crimson Snowdrop debuted at the Edinburgh International Film Festival in 2005 and went on to screen at film festivals across the world. The film was the inspiration for Seachd which incorporates several sequences from Foighidinn.

Miller's first short film premiered at the Edinburgh International Film Festival in 2004. Controversy surrounded the film in 2005 when it was incorrectly linked to the death of a child from the school attended by several of the cast.

=== New Forest Film Festival ===
Miller is a co-founder of the New Forest Film Festival, with film critic and broadcaster Mark Kermode, film professor Linda Ruth Williams, writer and illustrator Jo Cockwell, and film historian Mike Hammond.

== Other roles ==
Miller has co-founded and built several media technology start-ups including PeopleSound (an online music store and streaming service), SWOPEX (an online film, music and game exchange) and Beamly (originally second screen app, Zeebox) before becoming a social digital marketing platform and agency.

Miller has also worked as an executive in the music industry for Universal Music and EMI. In 2010, Miller competed on TV quiz show Eggheads as a member of winning team, The Black & White Stripes, representing Abbey Road Studios.

In 2018, Miller joined the founding team of brand start-up The Craftory.

== Early life and education ==
Miller grew up in Scotland where he attended Meldrum Primary School. He attended Nottingham High School between 1982 and 1989 and Salisbury School, USA in 1990. After undergraduate and postgraduate degrees in Economics at the London School of Economics he joined the US investment bank, JPMorgan Chase. He went on to study at London Film School and the National Film & Television School.
