= Challenger brand =

Brand that is neither the market leader nor niche

A challenger brand is a brand in an industry where it is neither the market leader nor a niche brand. Challenger brands are categorised by a mindset which sees they have business ambitions beyond conventional resources, and an intent to bring change to an industry.

The establishment brand is the antithesis to the challenger brand, the market leader being the primary example of an establishment brand.

Virgin Atlantic, BrewDog, Tyrells, innocent, Uber and Airbnb are all examples of challenger brands. The Challenger Project is a study into challenger brands and how they grow and succeed.

== Types of challenger brand ==
'Overthrow II: 10 strategies from the new wave of challengers', written by Adam Morgan and Malcolm Devoy, outlines ten types of challenger brand.

=== Missionary ===
A challenger brand looking to change something that is wrong or unfair in the world, and wearing that strong sense of purpose on its sleeve. Examples include Tony's Chocolonely and Patagonia.

=== Real & Human ===
A group of real people who genuinely care about what they are making, about their relationship with their customer, and about the people who are making their product. Examples include Zappos and Mailchimp.

=== Next Generation ===
The Next Generation challenger questions the appropriateness of the establishment brand – or even the whole category – for the current times. It challenges the relevance of the past to this new world, and identifies itself as a better choice for our new needs and circumstances. Examples include Impossible Foods and Oatly.

=== People's Champion ===
The People’s Champion is a brand with a mandate: it sees itself as standing up for a group of people who have been short-served or exploited by the establishment for too long, because the market leader has been relentlessly putting its own needs (and profits) first. Examples include T-Mobile US and Copa90.

=== Enlightened Zagger ===
The enlightened brand deliberately swimming against the prevailing cultural or category tide. The Enlightened Zagger often promotes the virtues of ‘slow’, of simplicity and reduction, or the surprising benefits of less. Examples include Vitsoe and the Slow Journalism subculture.

=== Democratiser ===
A challenger that takes something previously only available to the few, and makes it accessible to the many. Examples include Warby Parker and Fenty Beauty.

=== Irreverent Maverick ===
This challenger narrative is one of provocation, a poke in the ribs, deliberately setting out to entertain and engage – even court a little controversy. Examples include Dollar Shave Club and BrewDog.

=== Feisty Underdog ===
The Feisty Underdog is what many still regard (wrongly) as the classic challenger stance, in part because the history of challenger brands in the US is so strongly linked to it, from marketing icons like Avis and Pepsi to legendary sporting underdogs like the diminutive racehorse Seabiscuit. In brand terms, the challenger that adopts this narrative aims to reduce a crowded competitive world to a simple binary choice, creating the emotional illusion that there are in fact just two brands in a category for the consumer to choose between. Examples include Bumble and Under Armour.

=== Dramatic Disruptor ===
A brand and product that dramatically signals a real and significant product or service superiority. Examples include Casper and Tesla.

=== Local Hero ===
A challenger that champions the importance and character of local needs, local culture and local people, as opposed to the international market leader. Examples include Rapido and Shake Shack.

== History ==
The concept of a challenger brand was first introduced by Adam Morgan in 1999 in the business book, ‘Eating the Big Fish’. In this book, three specific criteria for challenger brands were defined: one, state of market, meaning the brand is not a market leader nor a niche brand; two, state of mind, meaning the brand has ambitions beyond conventional marketing resource; three, rate of success, meaning the brand has experienced significant and rapid growth.

In 2012, the media agency PhD and the strategic consultancy eatbigfish published 'Overthrow: 10 Ways To Tell A Challenger Story' which outlined ten different types of challenger brand and provided brand examples of each. A second edition, Overthrow II: 10 strategies from the new wave of challengers, was published in 2019 with an updated set of challenger types and new brand case studies and interviews.
