= Nelly Weissel =

Uruguayan actress

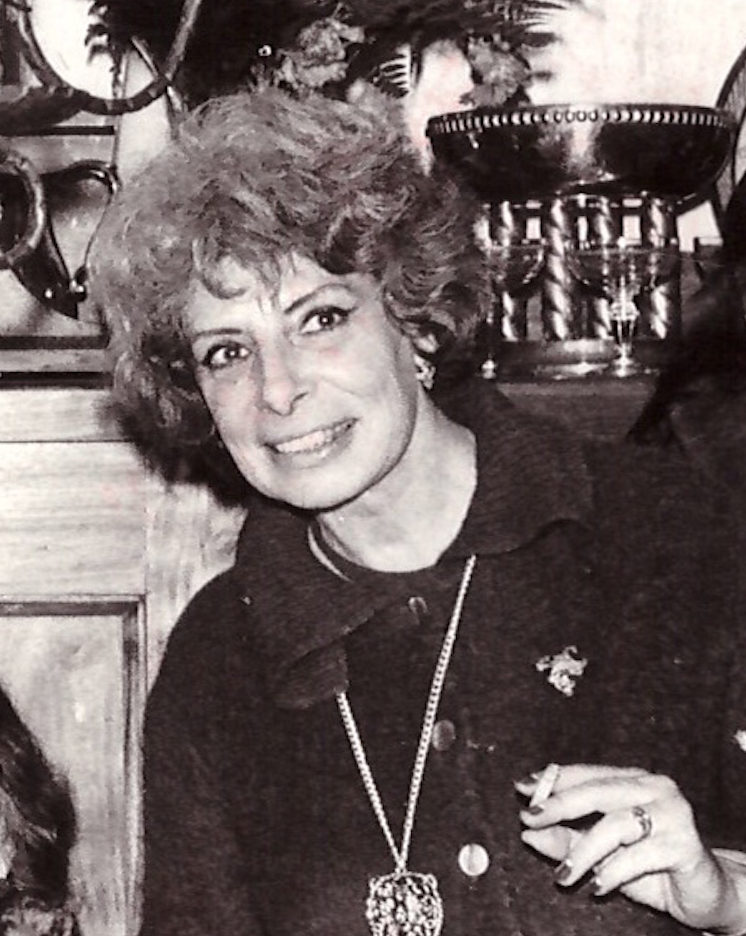
- Born: Nelly Weissel Urbin; 26 June 1920; Montevideo, Uruguay
- Died: 13 August 2010 (aged 90); Montevideo, Uruguay
- Occupations: Actress, director, author
- Years active: 1950–1990
- Spouse: Juan Fernando Vieytes Pérez
- Children: Maria del Carmen Vieytes

Nelly Weissel (26 June 1920 – 13 August 2010) was a Uruguayan actress of the stage. Weissel's career as a South American leading lady spanned more than 40 years. Known for her headstrong independence and spirited personality, she regularly played strong-willed, sophisticated women. A long-time cast member of the Comedia Nacional, she was best known for her theatre roles as Mary Cavan Tyrone in Eugene O'Neill's 1956 play Long Day's Journey into Night. Her performance in Huit Clos by Satre was praised among those of Katharine Hepburn and Cacilda Becker. Starring in several other performances, Weissel won Uruguay's Best Actress of 1959 and 1961.

== Early life ==
Weissel was born in Montevideo to merchant Leopoldo Weissel Hefele and Luisa Urbin, coming from a family of Austrian, Spanish and Italian descent.. While in Montevideo, she studied at the Deutsche Schule, after which she wrote a weekly column for La Mañana. Later, Weissel married the celebrated Uruguayan artist Juan Fernando Vieytes Pérez.

== Career ==
In 1951, Weissel debuted in the Uruguayan theatre scene with her writing of and subsequent performance in the prize-winning play "Gabriela"; acted by the highly noted ‘El Tinglado’ theatre group.

Fuelled by this success, in 1953 Weissel went on to create her own, later highly acclaimed, theatre company "La Escena" – later renamed to La Máscara. Founded Escena alongside Rafael Bangueses, Estela Vera Neleis and others; each successful in their own right.

Weissel's first major play at La Escena was "They Came to a City" by Priestley. A play on the experiences of various people who have come to live in their "ideal" city, and explores their hopes and reasons for doing so. During the period of success following, Weissel played several acclaimed roles in plays including as a titular character in Satre's Huit Clos, where her performance was praised among to that of Katharine Hepburn and Cacilda Becker. In Tea and Sympathy by Robert Anderson, Nelly played the lead character Laura, who helped a boy further explore his homosexuality. Later, Weissel also starred in Rodolfo Usigli's Corona de Sombras. In 1959, Weissel was crowned Uruguay's Best Actress.

=== Time at the Comedia Nacional ===
In 1961, Weissel joined the most prestigious theatre in Uruguay, the Comedia Nacional. Here, she played her highly acclaimed role as Mary Cavan Tyrone in the Tony Award winning Long Day's Journey into Night by Eugene O’Neill alongside the also celebrated Uruguayan Actor, Alberto Candeau.

She later won the 1961 award for Best Actress. In her later life, Nelly had a temporary break from the theatre after an episode of her personal life forced her to pause her acting. She re-joined the cast of the Comedia Nacional in 1972, and remained until 1990.

== Plays from her career ==
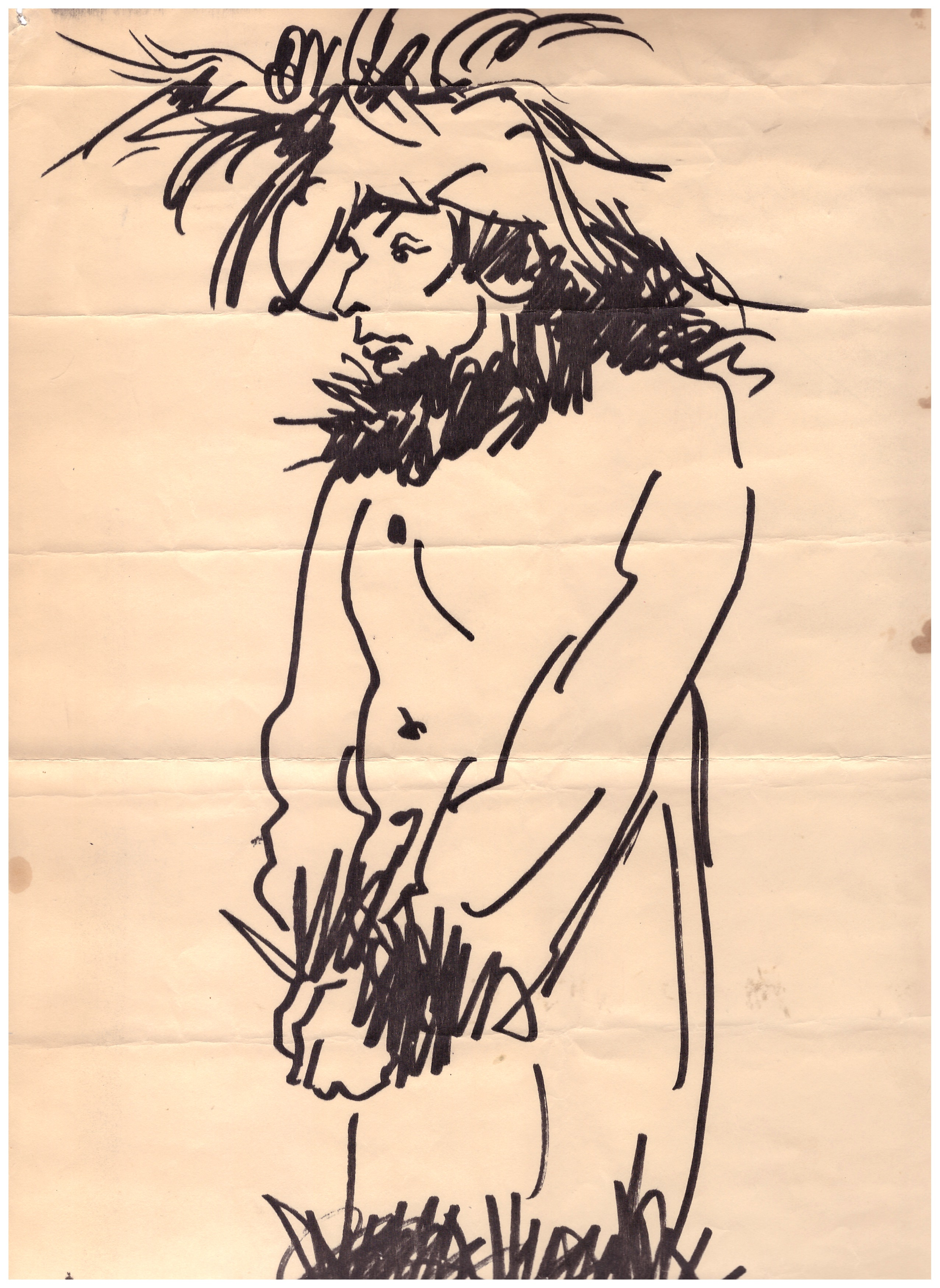
Sketch published in El País

- Long Day's Journey into Night by Eugene O’Neill
- They Came to a City by Priestley
- No Exit by Jean-Paul Satre
- Tea and Sympathy by Robert Anderson
- Corona de Sombras by Rodolfo Usigli
- La malquerida by Jacinto Benavente
- Uncle Vanya by Anton Chekhov
- The Lark by Jean Anouih
- The Wild Duck by Henrik Ibsen
- Knock by Jules Romains
- The Miser by Molière
- Right You Are (if you think so) by Luigi Pirandello
- The Visit by Friedrich Dürrenmatt
- The Trickster of Seville and the Stone Guest by Tirso de Molina
- A Streetcar Named Desire by Tennessee Williams
- The House of Bernarda Alba by Federico García Lorca
- Three Sisters by Anton Chekhov
- The Crucible by Arthur Miller

Year	Category	Film	Result	Winner
1959	Best Actress in Uruguay	—N/a	Won	—N/a
1961	Best Actress in Uruguay	—N/a	Won	—N/a
