= Birds Eye =

Brand of frozen foods

Birds Eye Limited
- Formerly: Birdseye Seafood, Inc.
- Type: Subsidiary
- Industry: Food
- Founded: 1922; 104 years ago
- Founder: Clarence Birdseye
- Fate: Acquired by Postum Cereal Company in 1929, other owners then
- Headquarters: Chicago, Illinois, US; Feltham, London, England; Mentone, Victoria, Australia
- Products: Frozen food
- Owner: Conagra Brands (US, 2018–present); Nomad Foods (Europe, 2014-present); Simplot (AU)
- Parent: General Foods (US, 1929–1990); Kraft Foods (US, 1990–1993); Dean Foods (US, 1993–2009); Pinnacle Foods (US, 2009–2018); Unilever (Europe, 1943–2006); Permira (Europe, 2006–2014)
- Website: birdseye.com

Birds Eye (also named Iglo in some countries) is an international brand of frozen foods founded in the United States and now owned by Conagra Brands in the United States, by Nomad Foods in Europe, and Simplot in Australia.

The former Birds Eye Company Ltd., originally named "Birdseye Seafood, Inc." had been established in the United States by Clarence Birdseye in 1922 to market frozen fish, being then acquired by the Postum Cereal Company in 1929. The company was then owned by other firms such as Dean Foods and Pinnacle Foods, which was eventually taken over by Conagra Brands in 2018. Since then, Conagra has been managing rights to the Birds Eye brand in the U.S.

== History and production ==
=== United States ===
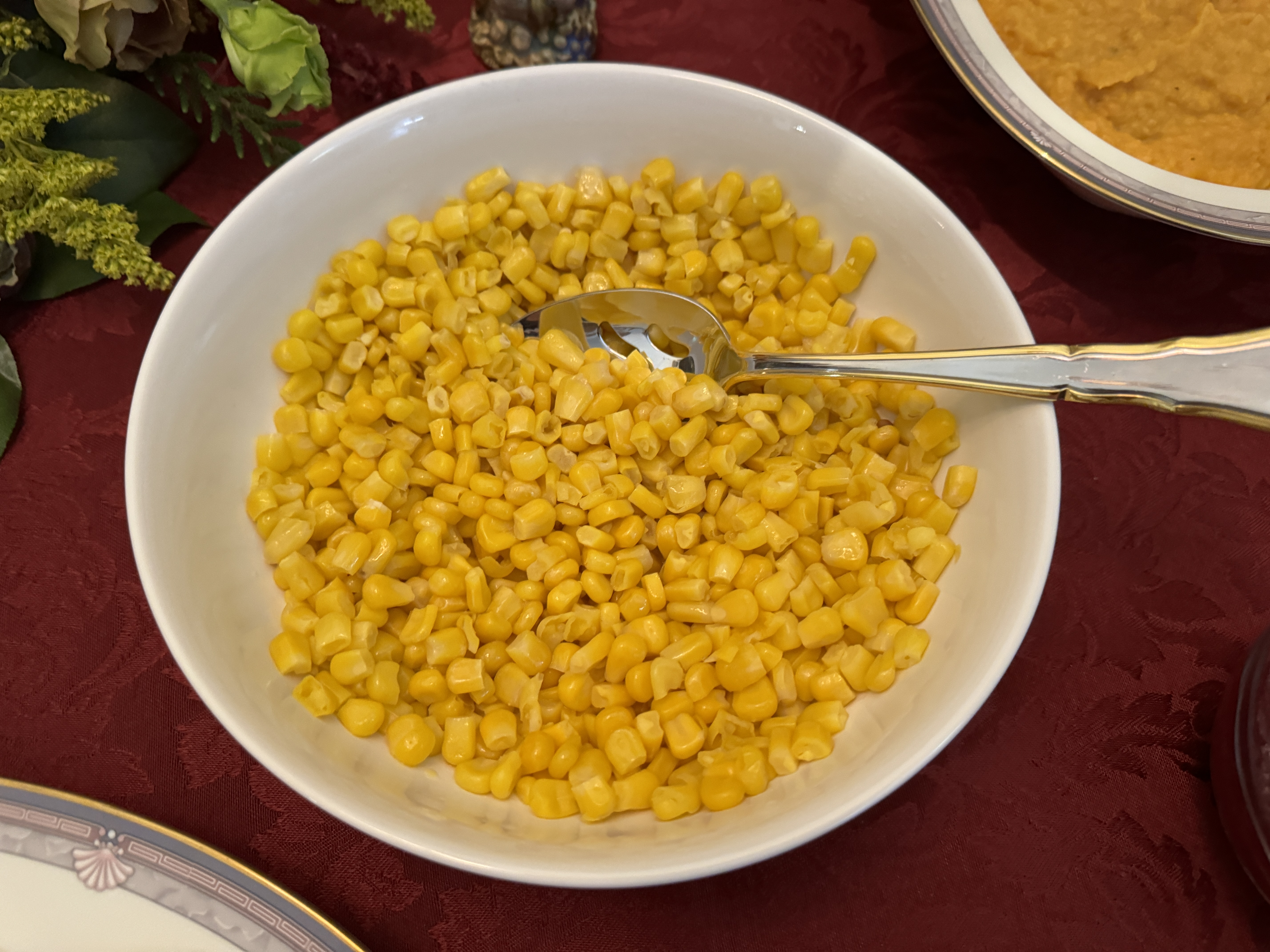
A prepared bowl of Birds Eye Steamfresh Super Sweet Corn in 2023.

In the early 1900s, during his travels through Northern Canada, Clarence Birdseye of Montclair, New Jersey, saw the Inuit use ice, wind, and temperature to instantly freeze freshly-caught fish. His curiosity piqued, and Clarence wondered if this method, called flash freezing, could also be applied to other foods. This 1920s hunting trip to Canada inspired Birdseye's food preserving method.

Birdseye conducted experiments and received patents for the development of greatly improved methods to freeze fish for commercial production. In 1922, he formed "Birdseye Seafood, Inc.", to freeze fish fillets with chilled air at −45 °F (−43 °C). In 1924, he developed an entirely new process for commercially viable quick-freezing: packing fish in cartons, then freezing the contents between two refrigerated surfaces under pressure. Birdseye created the "General Seafood Corporation", to promote this method. In 1929, Birdseye sold his company and patents for $22 million to Goldman Sachs and the Postum Cereal Company, which eventually established a new business, General Foods, and which founded the "Birds Eye Frozen Food Company".

After being acquired by the Philip Morris Companies, General Foods then merged into Kraft Foods Inc. in 1990. Birds Eye was sold to Dean Foods in 1993 and was independently owned by Birds Eye Foods of Rochester, New York until it was purchased by Pinnacle Foods in 2009. In March 2010, Pinnacle announced it would be closing the Rochester headquarters and moving operations to New Jersey. Pinnacle Foods was then acquired by Conagra Brands in June 2018, with Birds Eye becoming part of its brand portfolio.

=== Europe ===
In June 1938, Frosted Foods was formed to exploit the Birds Eye Frozen Foods brand in the UK.

In 1943, Unilever acquired T. J. Lipton, a majority stake in Frosted Foods (owner of the Birds Eye brand in the UK) and Batchelors Peas, one of the largest vegetables canners in the United Kingdom.

Birds Eye also operated a factory in Grimsby, mass producing a range of fish and vegetable based frozen foods, moving to Unilever's Ladysmith Road site for the mass production of fish fingers in 1955, this factory closed 2005, with the loss of 650 jobs. The fish finger became the company's staple product, being developed in 1955 at its factory in Great Yarmouth, by H A J Scott, and test marketed in the south of England before mass production began. Production of fish fingers moved to the manufacturing site in Lowestoft in 1986. One of the company's main UK pea processing sites is in Gipsyville, Hull; the company formerly operated a large pea processing factory in the same area; it opened in 1967 and closed in 2007.

On August 28, 2006, it was confirmed that Unilever had agreed to the sale of the UK brand, held since the late 1930s, to private equity house Permira for £1.2bn.

=== Oceania ===
The Birds Eye brand in Australia and New Zealand is owned by Simplot Australia Pty Ltd, a wholly owned subsidiary of the J.R. Simplot Company. Simplot purchased Birds Eye and many of Australia's leading food brands from Pacific Dunlop's Pacific Brands in the mid-1990s. In 2015, Birds Eye was awarded by Reader's Digest as ‘"Australia’s Most Trusted Frozen Food Brand".

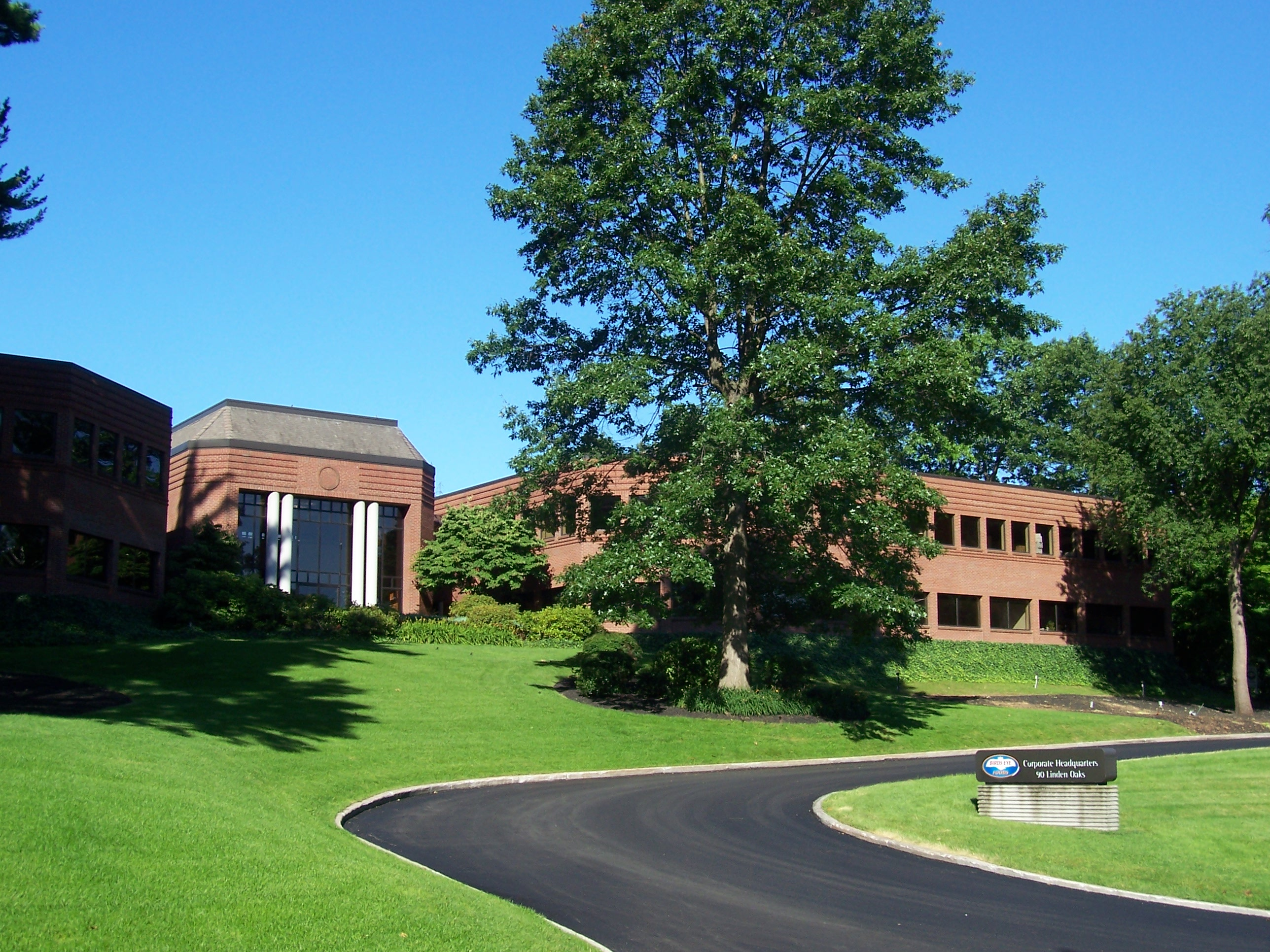
Birds Eye headquarters in Brighton, NY, 2010

== Brands portfolio ==
Birds Eye has acquired many well-established brands, some of which are distributed regionally and not nationally. The following brands are owned and distributed by Birds Eye:

- Bernstein's
- Brooks
- Comstock Wilderness
- C&W
- Freshlike
- Greenwood
- Husman's
- McKenzie's
- Nalley
- Riviera
- Snyder of Berlin, potato chip maker based near Berlin, Pennsylvania (which had been split off from pretzel manufacturer Snyder's of Hanover in Hanover, Pennsylvania in 1950)
- Steamfresh
- Tim's Cascade Snacks
- Voila

== Advertising ==
=== Captain Birdseye (United Kingdom) ===
In the United Kingdom, Captain Birdseye was an advertising mascot of the brand, from the 1960s to late 1990s. Appearing in numerous television and billboard commercials since 1967, he was played by the actor John Hewer between then and 1998 e.g. in 1986 advert for Birdseye Fish Fingers. After the retirement of the original actor, the brand was relaunched with a younger man with designer stubble (played by Thomas Pescod), but was less popular, and the character was dropped from Birdeye's advertising. A 2014 redesign of the brand's packaging includes artwork resembling the original Captain Bird's Eye.

=== Other British advertising ===
Child actress Patsy Kensit appeared in an early 1970s advert for frozen peas. This featured a jingle including the slogan "Sweet as the moment when the pod went 'pop'".

In the late 1970s and early 1980s, June Whitfield appeared in a series of television advertisements for Birds Eye products, featuring the concluding voice-over line: "... it can make a dishonest woman of you!". The series was the brainchild of advertising art director Vernon Howe and was mentioned in several of his obituaries.

Another popular campaign in the 1970s was for Birds Eye Beefburgers, which was one of the first to feature regional dialects (i.e. from Leeds), a novelty on television at the time. The series began in 1973 and the adverts were produced by advertising agency Collett Dickenson Pearce (CDP) and directed by Alan Parker before later being taken over by Paul Weiland, the slogan being "somehow, other beefburgers just don't taste the same". Initially, they starred Paul Malkin as Dan Godfrey and the late Darren Cockerill as his brother Ben, with the latter only ever wanting to eat beefburgers from Birds Eye. After Malkin left, he was replaced by Heather MacDonald as neighbour Mary, who had an unrequited crush on Ben. Cockerill departed in 1979 (with Ben emigrating to Australia) and was himself replaced by twins (played by Andy and Stephen Halstead) who Mary looked after at Ben's old house. Cockerill returned for a final farewell with MacDonald in the early 1980s and the series briefly continued with a "new" Ben and Mary (played by Jonathan Slater and Fiona Rook respectively) before CDP lost the Birds Eye contract shortly afterwards.

Advertising campaigns of the 1980s included one for Potato waffles that had a jingle including the words Waffley versatile. A popular advertisement for Birds Eye Steakhouse Grills featured a scene of hungry building site workers heading home in a minibus and singing about what they were hoping their wives would serve with their steak burgers. The song to the tune of Que Sera, Sera (Whatever Will Be, Will Be) included the tag line "we hope it's chips".

Adverts the early 2010s featured a hand puppet polar bear named Clarence (voiced by Willem Dafoe), who in most adverts would be seen in a person's freezer and would advise them to eat Birds Eye products instead of alternatives. In 2011, Birds Eye created toy versions of Clarence that could be obtained when consumers sent away six tokens from boxes of Birds Eye fish fingers or cod fillets.

== 2013 European meat adulteration scandal ==
In 2013, DNA tests revealed that horsemeat was present in Birds Eye chili con carne that was sold in Belgium and was produced and supplied by a Belgian group named Frigilunch. As a result, Birds Eye withdrew all other products produced by the same supplier in the UK and Ireland.
