= List of supermarket chains in Bosnia and Herzegovina =

This is a list of supermarket chains in Bosnia and Herzegovina.

== Supermarkets and hypermarkets ==
Name	Stores	Type of stores	First store in Bosnia and Herzegovina	Parent	Notes
Konzum and Mercator	272	hypermarket	2005	Fortenova Group	Mercator in Bosnia and Herzegovina ceased to exist as an independent legal entity, i.e. a separate business entity and was merged with Konzum.
Bingo	224	hypermarket	1993	Bingo	
Amko Komerc	84	supermarket	1995	Amko Komerc	
BEST Travnik	59	supermarket	1995	BEST Travnik	
Tropic & mojMarket	56	supermarket	2002	Tropic Group	
Kort	56	supermarket	1995	Fructa-Trade	
Fortuna	19	hypermarket	2011	Leburić Komerc	
Klas	51	supermarket	1902	AS Group	
Namex	40	supermarket	2007	Namex	
YimoR	36	supermarket	1988	YimoR	
Deny-Prom d.o.o.	32	supermarket	1996	Deny-Prom d.o.o.	
Robot	26	hypermarket	1995	Robot General Trading	
Belamionix	25	hypermarket		Belamionix	
Onogošt	21	supermarket	1996	Onogošt	
Bost	18	supermarket	1999	Bost	
FIS	15	hypermarket	1995	FIS	
Ekor Komerc	14	supermarket	1987	Ekor Komerc	
Hoše Komerc	9	supermarket	1984	Hoše Komerc	
Z Marketi	14	supermarket	2002	Zvorničanka	
Penny Plus	9	supermarket	2007	Penny Sarajevo	
Škafa	7	supermarket	2001	ŠKAFA	
Megamarkt	7	supermarket	2006	Mega-markt	
MERE	3	hypermarket	2022	Svetofor	
Prodex	2	supermarket	2000	Prodex	
Lidl	7-8 (coming soon) discount hypermarket	2027	Lidl	Future chain; under construction, expansion confirmed because of an already built store and a launched careers page.	

=== Former chains ===
Name	Stores	Type of stores	First store in Bosnia and Herzegovina	Closed/sold	Parent	Sold to
TD Marketi	49	market		2006	TD Marketi	Amko Komerc
VF-Komerc	15	hypermarket	1998	2007	VF-Komerc	Konzum
DP Marketi	74	supermarket	1990	2011	Drvopromet	Mercator
Merkur	30	supermarket		2011	MIMS	Amko Komerc
Maxi	39	supermarket		2014	Delhaize Group	Tropic
Interex	24	hypermarket	1999	2014	Intermarché	Bingo
Tuš	25	supermarket		2021	Tuš	Bingo
Adna Commerc	5	supermarket		2019	Adna Commerc	Bingo
Euro Centar	3	supermarket	2003	2019	Europa-Trade	Bingo

== Drugstores ==
Name	Stores	Type of stores	First store in Bosnia and Herzegovina	Parent
DM	83	retail	2006	dm-drogerie markt
CM	81	retail	2003	cm-cosmetic market
Didaco	27	retail	1999	Didaco Commerce
Inglot	2	retail	2014	Inglot Cosmetics
Inoma	6	retail	2012	Inoma
Izbor trgovine	69	retail	1997	Izbor
L'Occitane	4	retail	2014	L'Occitane en Provence
Lush	2	retail	2009	Lush
MAC Cosmetics	1	retail	2018	Orbico Beauty BH

=== Former ===
Name	Stores	Type of stores	First store in Bosnia and Herzegovina	Closed/sold	Parent
Rituals	1	retail	2010	-	Global Hygeia Grupa

== Home improvement, furniture and toys ==
Name	Stores	Type of stores	First store in Bosnia and Herzegovina	Parent
Ashley Furniture Homestore	1	retail	2024	Ashley HomeStore
Centrum	9	retail	1998	Centrum Trade
Doğtaş Exclusive	1	retail	2015	Doğtaş
Dormeo	3	retail	2016	Studio Moderna
Jysk	28	retail	2010	Jysk
Jumbo	6	hypermarket	2017	Balfin Group
Natuzzi	3	retail	1998	Living Deco
OBI	1	retail	2003	Tengelmann Group
Top Shop	22	retail	1998	Studio Moderna
Zeka Baucentri	12	retail	1995	Zeka-Comerc

=== Former ===
Name	Stores	Type of stores	First store in Bosnia and Herzegovina	Closed/sold	Parent	Sold to
Merkur	1	hypermarket	2008	2016	Merkur	Bingo
BauWelt	2	retail	2014			

== Clothing, sport and healthcare ==
Name	Stores	Type of stores	First store in Bosnia and Herzegovina	Parent
Alma Ras	15	retail	1998	Alma Ras
Astra	63	retail	-	Proeksim
Antony Morato	1	retail	2024	United Family
Azel France	79	retail	2003	Azel France
Barbour	1	retail	2024	Time Out
Birkenstock	2	retail	2012	S&P
Borovo	43	retail	-	Proeksim
Blukids	7	retail	2015	Tiffany
Bershka	4	retail	-	Inditex
Buzz	6	retail	-	Buzz Sneaker Station
Calvin Klein Jeans	2	retail	2018	Fashion Team
Carpisa	6	retail	-	Carpisa
Cesare Paciotti	1	retail	-	Gema Komerc
Cropp	2	retail	2018	LPP
Cortefiel	1	retail	-	Tendam
Deichmann	16	retail	2013	Deichmann SE
Desigual	2	retail	2018	Proeksim
ECCO	3	retail	2017	Planika Flex
Gema	5	retail	-	Gema Komerc
Gerry Weber	3	retail	-	Grateks Moda
Geox	2	retail	-	Planika Flex
Granoff	8	retail	2003	Granoff
Guess	2	retail	2012	Proeksim
H&M	2	retail	2019	H&M
House	4	retail	2018	LPP
Hugo Boss	1	retail	2018	Proeksim
Intersport	11	retail	2000	Intersport
Jeordie's	8	retail	-	Jeordie's
Juventa Sport	41	retail	1999	Jacimovic
Koton	2	retail	2014	Koton
Levi's	5	retail	2006	Fama
Lindex	7	retail	-	Tiffany
Liu Jo	1	retail	2015	Proeksim
LULU Gold	5	retail	-	United Family Čitluk
LC Waikiki	10	retail	-	LC Waikiki
Marella	2	retail	2014	Sportina Group
Massimo Dutti	1	retail	2014	Inditex
Modiana	10	retail	2000	Montecristo
Mohito	1	retail	2018	LPP
Mango	2	retail	-	Mango
Nine West	2	retail	-	Ivex
Nike	3	retail	2015	Sport Vision
New Yorker	9	retail	2008	New Yorker
Office Shoes	12	retail	-	Office Shoes
Okaïdi	3	retail	-	Grateks Moda
Orsay	7	retail	-	Sportina Group
Parfois	6	retail	-	Sportina Group
Paul & Shark	1	retail	1998	Paul & Shark
Penti	7	retail	2011	Intima-ST
Pepco	31	retail	2023	Pepco
Planika	69	retail	-	Planika Flex
Planet Obuća	11	retail	-	Planet Obuća
Pull&Bear	3	retail	2012	Inditex
P.S. Fashion	18	retail	-	P.S. Fashion
Polo Ralph Lauren	1	retail	2014	Time Out
Reserved	1	retail	2019	LPP
Retro Shoes	12	retail	-	Retro Shoes
Skechers	1	retail	2019	Proeksim
s.Oliver	9	retail	-	Bingo
Sport Vision	30	retail	1996	Sport Vision
Sport Reality	21	retail	-	Sport Reality
Springfield	7	retail	2010	Tendam
Sinsay	36	retail	2018	LPP
Stradivarius	4	retail	-	Inditex
Superdry	4	retail	2019	Gema Komerc
Terranova	4	retail	2004	Teddy Group
The Athlete's Foot	1	retail	2020	Intersport
Tom Tailor	11	retail	-	Sportina Group
Tommy Hilfiger	3	retail	-	Promoda / United Family
Tiffany	10	retail	1998	Tiffany
Timberland	2	retail	-	Office Shoes
Trussardi	1	retail	2020	Fashion Team
Ulla Popken	2	retail	2010	Tiffany
United Colors of Benetton	4	retail	-	SMC
U.S. Polo Assn.	5	retail	2014	Elegans
UPIM	5	retail	2022	Tiffany
Woman's Secret	5	retail	2014	Tendam
XYZ	3	retail	2014	Sportina Group
Zara	3	retail	2012	Inditex

=== Former ===
Name	Stores	Type of stores	First store in Bosnia and Herzegovina	Closed
Accessorize	3	retail	2009	-
ALDO	2	retail	2012	-
Diesel	1	retail	1999	-
Esprit	2	retail	2005	-
Fifty Factory	1	retail	2016	2021
Tally Weijl	3	retail	2012	2018

== Food and coffee chains ==
Name	Stores	Type of stores	First store in Bosnia and Herzegovina	Parent
BASH	5	fast food restaurant / drive-in	2023	A.W.G (ex McDonald's)
Burger King	3	fast food restaurant / drive-in	2023	Buçaj Retail
Caribou Coffee	6	coffee shop	2020	Herbal Group
Chipas	4	fast food restaurant	-	Chipas Concept
Fabrika coffee	8	coffee shop	2020	Fabrika coffee
Gönül Kahvesi	2	coffee shop	2014	Universal Consulting Group
Juice&Smoothies	8	juice and smoothie bar	-	Juice&Smoothies
KFC	5	fast food restaurant / drive-in	2022	TASTRA
Metropolis	6	coffee shop	1998	Metropolis
Montana	4	restaurant	2003	Montana
Milky	3	pancake house	2018	Milky
MADO	2	gelato shop	2023	Herbal Group
Marshall's Gelato	3	gelato shop	2017	Marshall's Gelato
Mrkva	5	fast food restaurant	-	Mrkva
Mrvica	2	coffee shop	2015	Mrvica
Popeyes	0	fast food restaurant / drive-in	201X	Buçaj Retail
Pop's Caffe Food	7	restaurant	2012	Pop's Caffe Food
Spazio Caffè	3	coffee shop / restaurant	2012	Complex
Taco Bell	2	fast food restaurant	2024	TASTRA
Torte i To	1	cakery	2017	Torte i To
Vapiano	1	restaurant	2012	Bingo
Vatra	3	coffee shop / restaurant	2005	Bingo
Žeks Döner	6	fast food restaurant	2015	Žeks Döner

=== Former ===
Name	Stores	Type of stores	First store in Bosnia and Herzegovina	Closed/sold	Parent
Aida	1	coffee shop	2014	2018	Aida
Coffee Fellows	1	coffee shop	2012	2013	Coffee Fellows
Espressolab	1	coffee shop	2016	2022	Global Invest Group
McDonald's	5	fast food restaurant / drive-in	2011	2022	Gliese 581g
Surf’n’Fries	1	fast food restaurant	2015	2023	SNF Adria
Tasty Donuts & Coffee	2	coffee shop	2017	2020	Tasty Gastro

== Cinema and entertainment chains ==
Name	Venues	Type	First venue in Bosnia and Herzegovina	Parent
CineStar	7	multiplex cinema	2012	CineStar
Cineplexx	3	multiplex cinema	2017	Cineplexx

=== Former ===
Name	Stores	Type of stores	First store in Bosnia and Herzegovina	Closed/sold	Parent
Cinema City	1	multiplex cinema	2009	2020	Forum

== Gas stations ==
Name	Stations	First station in Bosnia and Herzegovina	Parent
Nestro	85	1945	Nestro Petrol
Nešković	50	1991	Nešković Group
Energopetrol	57	1947	Holdina
INA	51	2000	Holdina
Petrol	40	1999	Petrol Group
Gazprom	34	2013	Gazprom
NIS Petrol	11	2014	Gazprom
HIFA Petrol	45	2005	HIFA Petrol
HIFA	32	1996	HIFA Group
