= List of companies of Bosnia and Herzegovina =

Location of Bosnia and Herzegovina

Bosnia and Herzegovina is a country in Southeastern Europe located on the Balkan Peninsula. Sarajevo is the capital and largest city. Bosnia faces the dual-problem of rebuilding a war-torn country and introducing transitional liberal market reforms to its formerly mixed economy. One legacy of the previous era is a strong industry; under former republic president Džemal Bijedić and SFRY President Josip Broz Tito, metal industries were promoted in the republic, resulting in the development of a large share of Yugoslavia's plants; S.R. Bosnia and Herzegovina had a very strong industrial export oriented economy in the 1970s and 1980s, with large scale exports worth millions of US$.

For further information on the types of business entities in this country and their abbreviations, see "Business entities in Bosnia and Herzegovina".

== SEE TOP 100 ==
The SEE TOP 100 is an annual ranking showcasing the largest companies, banks and insurers in Southeast Europe since 2008. The ranking includes separate lists of top 100 companies, top 100 banks and top 100 insurers in Albania, Bosnia and Herzegovina, Bulgaria, Croatia, North Macedonia, Moldova, Montenegro, Romania, Serbia, and Slovenia. One company from Bosnia and Herzegovina appeared on the list for 2025:

Top 100 companies
| Overall rank | Name | Sector | Revenue (€B) | Employees |
|---|---|---|---|---|
| 72 | Bingo | Food retailers & wholesalers | 1.1 | 8,108 |

== Notable firms ==
This list includes notable companies with primary headquarters located in the country. The industry and sector follow the Industry Classification Benchmark taxonomy. Organizations which have ceased operations are included and noted as defunct.

Notable companies Status: P=Private, S=State; A=Active, D=Defunct
| Name | Industry | Sector | Headquarters | Founded | Notes | Status | |
|---|---|---|---|---|---|---|---|
| Agrokomerc | Consumer goods | Food products | Velika Kladuša | 1963 | Food | P | A |
| Aluminij | Basic materials | Aluminum | Mostar | 1975 | Aluminum | P | A |
| Banjalučka Pivara | Consumer goods | Brewers | Banja Luka | 1873 | Brewery | P | A |
| BH Pošta | Industrials | Delivery services | Sarajevo | 2001 | Postal services | S | A |
| BH Telecom | Telecommunications | Fixed line telecommunications | Sarajevo | 2004 | Telcom | S | A |
| Bihaćka pivovara | Consumer goods | Brewers | Bihać | 1990 | Brewery | P | A |
| Bingo | Consumer services | Food retailers & wholesalers | Tuzla | 1993 | Supermarket | P | A |
| BN Music | Consumer services | Broadcasting & entertainment | Bijeljina | 2003 | Record label | P | A |
| Bosnalijek | Health care | Pharmaceuticals | Sarajevo | 1951 | Pharmaceuticals | P | A |
| Central Bank of Bosnia and Herzegovina | Financials | Banks | Sarajevo | 1997 | Central bank | S | A |
| Dnevni avaz | Consumer services | Publishing | Sarajevo | 1995 | Daily newspaper | P | A |
| Dnevni list | Consumer services | Publishing | Mostar | 1992 | Daily newspaper | P | A |
| Elektroprivreda Bosne i Hercegovine | Utilities | Conventional electricity | Sarajevo | 1945 | Power utility | S | A |
| Elektroprivreda HZHB | Utilities | Conventional electricity | Mostar | 1992 | Power utility | S | A |
| Elektroprivreda Republike Srpske | Utilities | Conventional electricity | Trebinje | 1992 | Power utility | S | A |
| Energopetrol | Consumer services | Specialty retailers | Sarajevo | 1947 | Gas stations | P | A |
| Gramofon | Consumer services | Broadcasting & entertainment | Sarajevo | 2003 | Record label | P | A |
| Hercegovina Osiguranje | Financials | Full line insurance | Mostar | 1998 | Insurance | P | D |
| Homework HUB | Industrials | Business support services | Sarajevo | 2019 | Coworking space and student center | P | A |
| Hrvatska pošta Mostar | Industrials | Delivery services | Mostar | 1993 | Postal services | S | A |
| HT Eronet | Telecommunications | Fixed line telecommunications | Mostar | 2003 | Telcom | S | A |
| Icar Air | Consumer services | Airlines | Tuzla | 2000 | Airline | P | A |
| Mareco Index Bosnia | Industrials | Business support services | Sarajevo | 1996 | Market research | P | A |
| Oslobođenje | Consumer services | Publishing | Sarajevo | 1943 | Newspaper | P | A |
| Pivara Tuzla | Consumer goods | Brewers | Tuzla | 1884 | Brewery | P | A |
| Pošte Srpske | Industrials | Delivery services | Banja Luka | 1996 | Postal services | S | A |
| Railways of the Federation of Bosnia and Herzegovina | Industrials | Railroads | Sarajevo | 2001 | Railway | S | A |
| Republika Srpska Railways | Industrials | Railroads | Banja Luka | 1992 | Railways | S | A |
| Robot General Trading | Consumer services | Food retailers & wholesalers | Sarajevo | 1995 | Supermarket | P | A |
| Sarajevo Tobacco Factory | Consumer goods | Tobacco | Sarajevo | 1880 | Tobacco | P | A |
| Sarajevska pivara | Consumer goods | Brewers | Sarajevo | 1864 | Brewery | P | A |
| Telekom Srpske | Telecommunications | Fixed line telecommunications | Banja Luka | 1996 | Telcom | S | A |
| Unioninvest | Industrials | Heavy construction | Sarajevo | 1949 | Construction | P | A |
| UNITIC | Financials | Real estate holding & development | Sarajevo | 1998 | Business real estate | P | A |

== Gallery ==
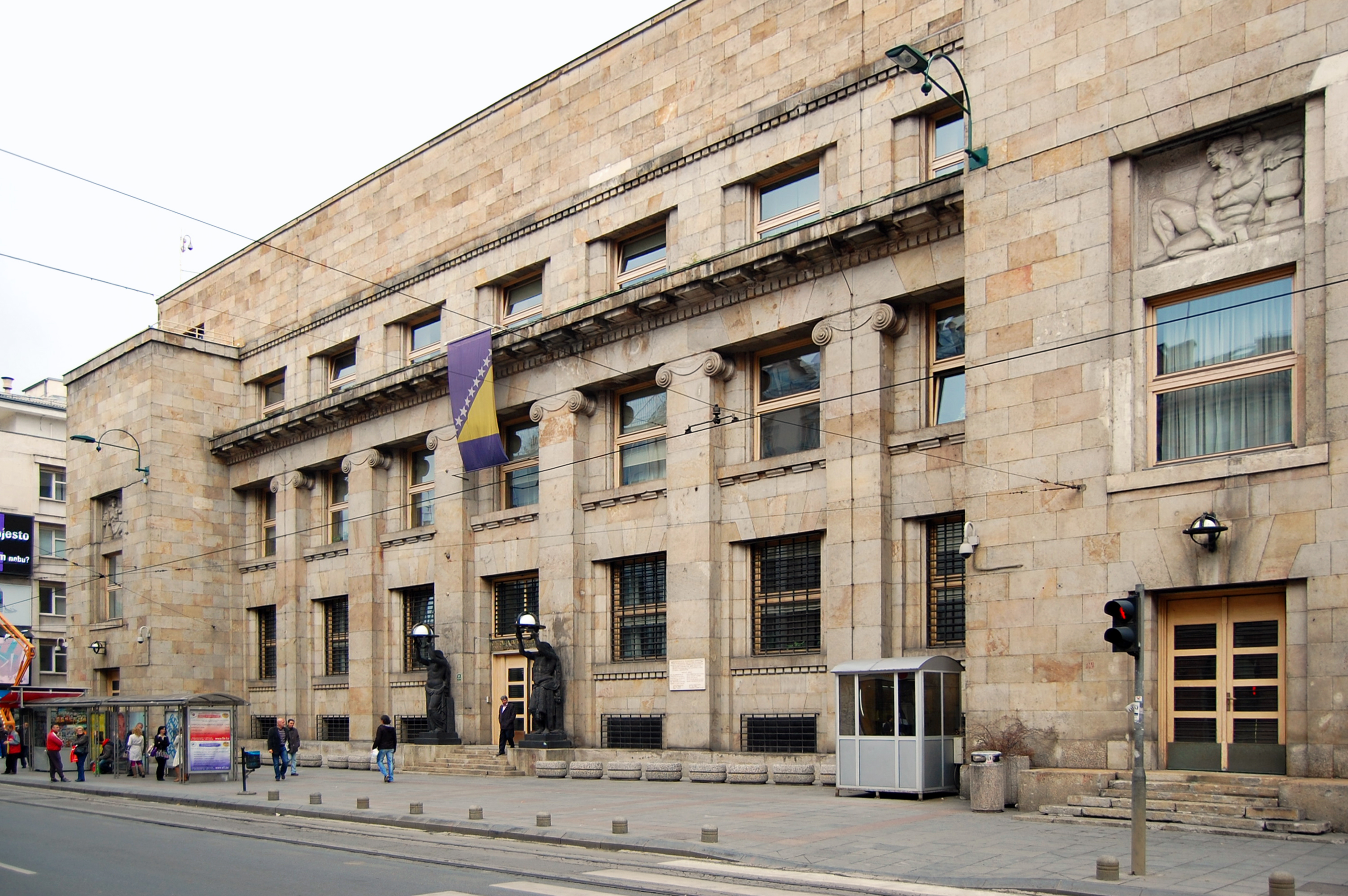
Central Bank of Bosnia and Herzegovina, situated in Sarajevo

Avaz Twist Tower, the headquarters of Dnevni avaz

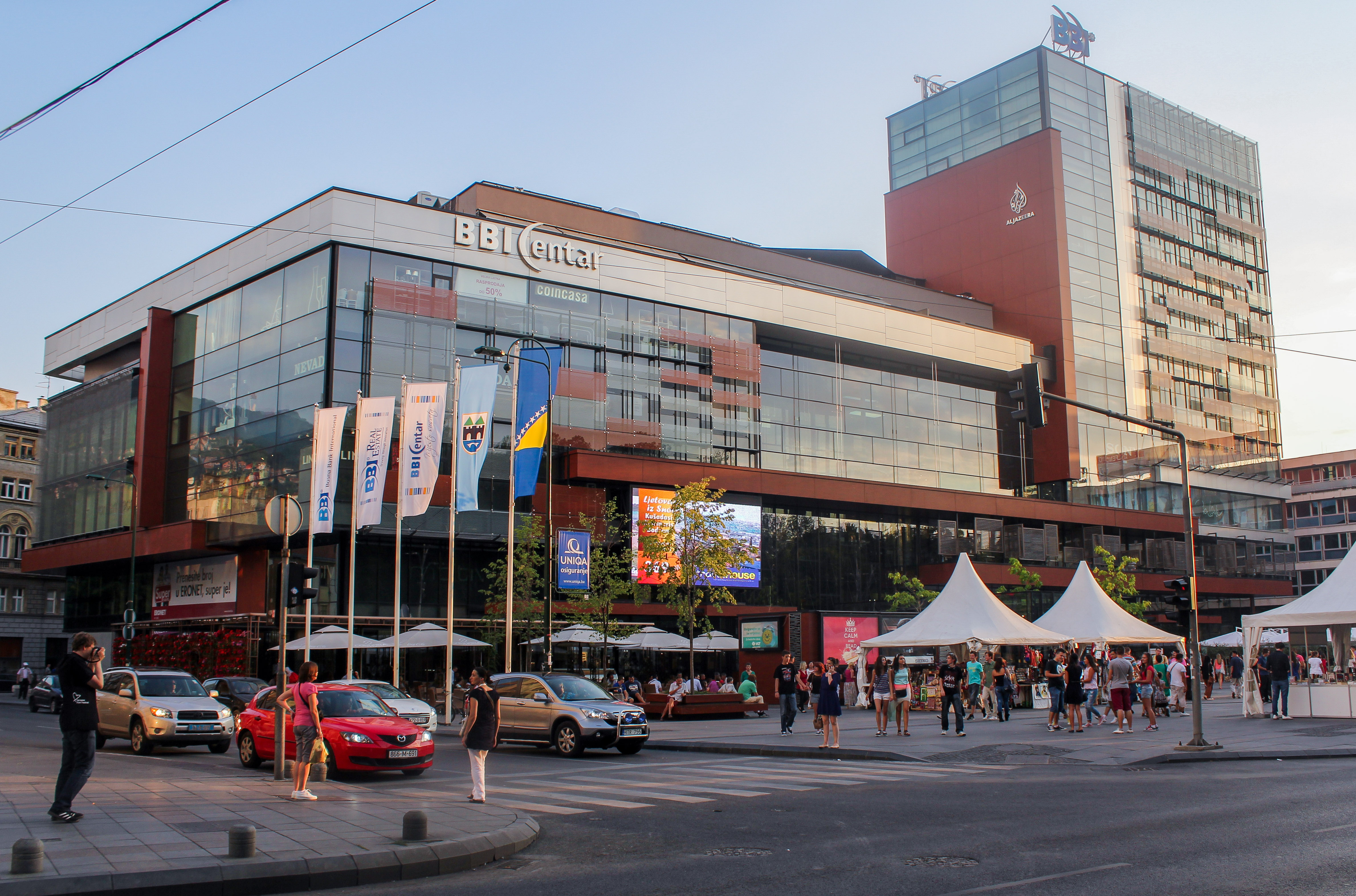
ARIA shopping and business center

Bosmal business center
