= Beer in Bosnia and Herzegovina =

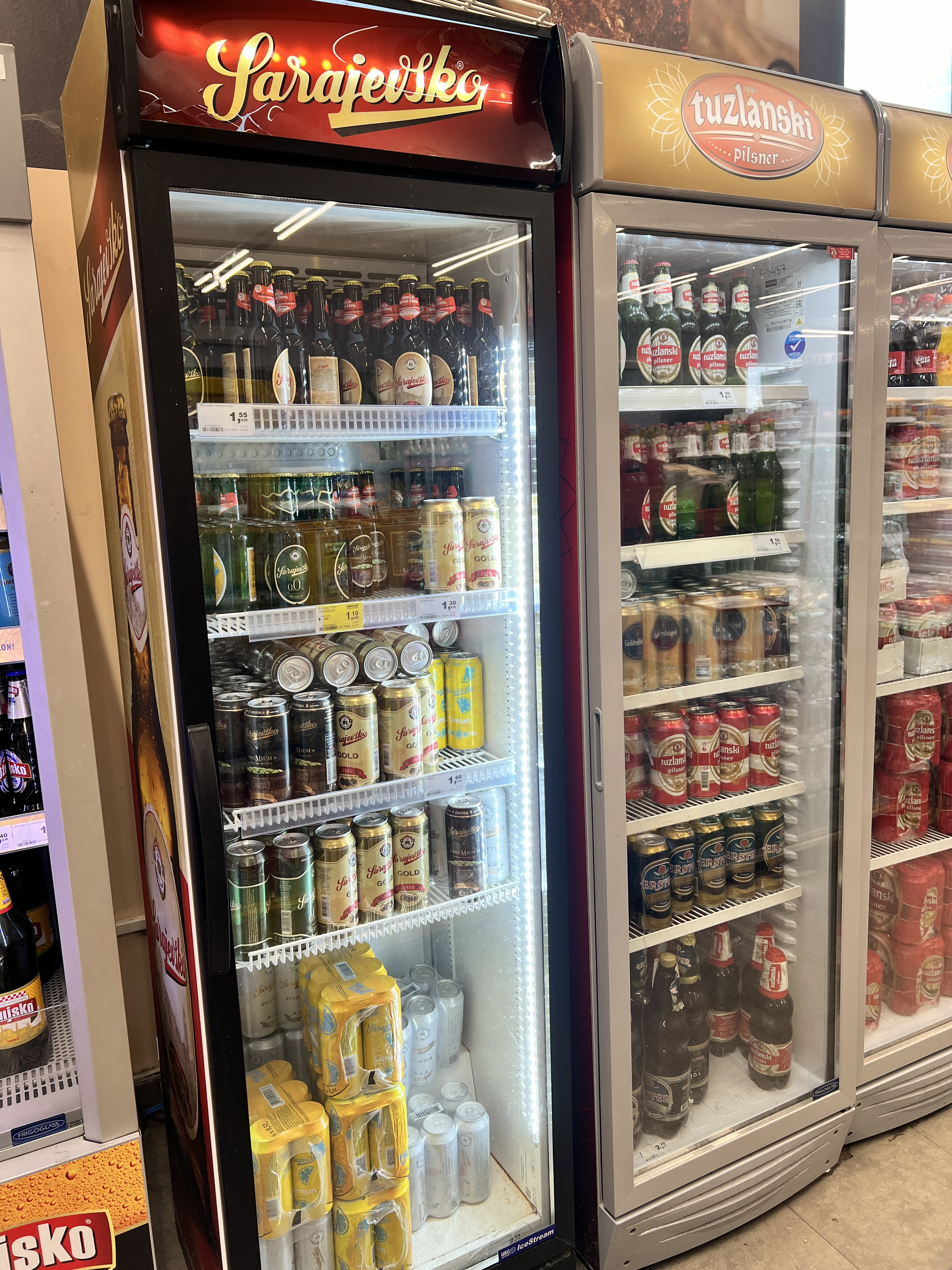
Two beer fridges with beer from Bosnia and Herzegovina in a supermarket in Neum. The fridge on the left contains different beer brands from Sarajevo Brewery. The fridge on the right contains the brands Goldenhügel Premium Pils, Tuzlanski Pilsner, and Erster.

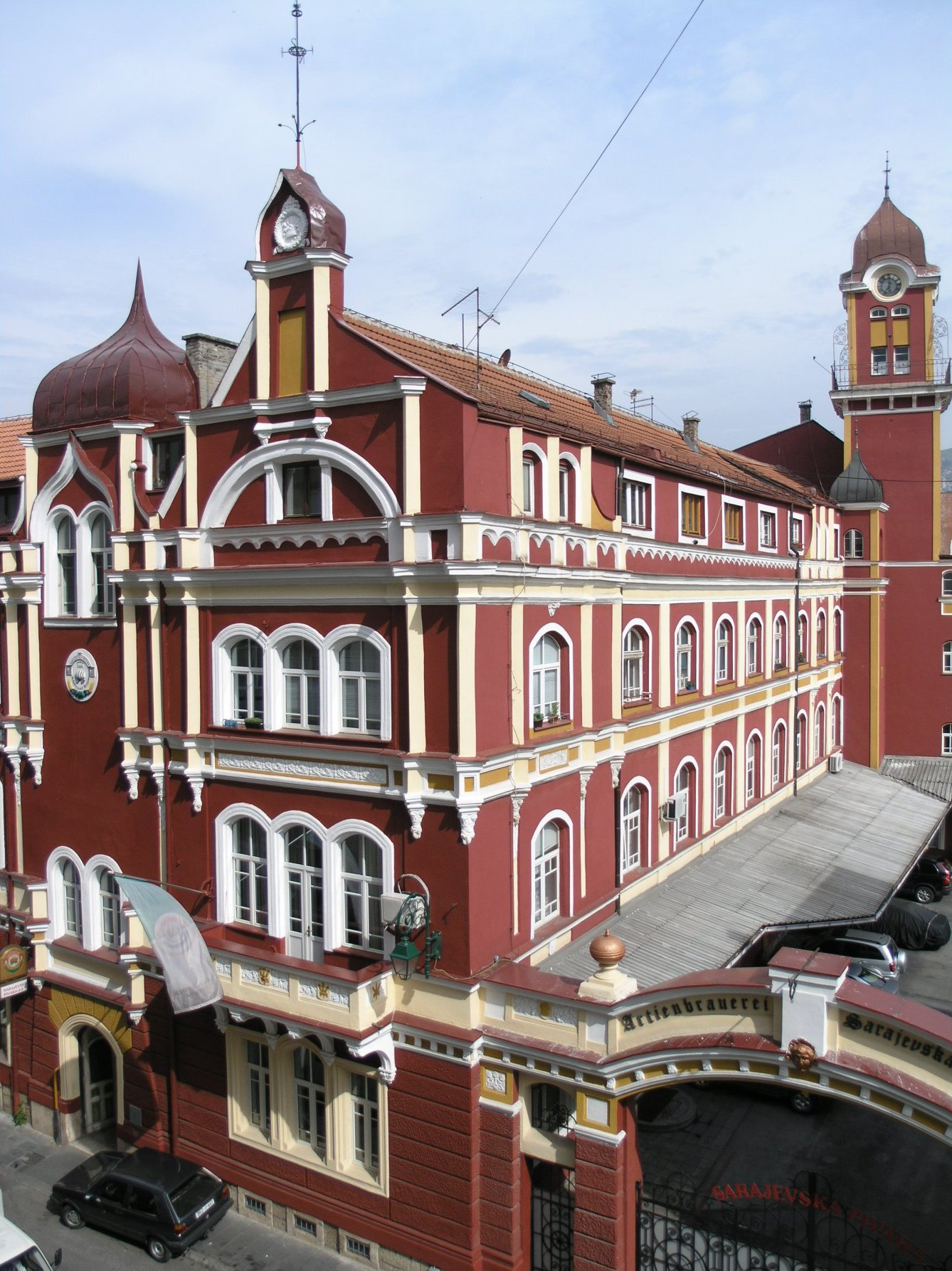
Sarajevo Brewery

Beer is a popular beverage in Bosnia and Herzegovina.

Most of them were established in the 19th century. The largest brewery is Sarajevska Pivara which was established in 1864. Other breweries include Pivara Tuzla (1884), Banjalučka Pivara (1873), Bihaćka Pivovara (1990), and Hercegovačka Pivovara in Mostar (2007)

== Breweries and brands ==
The main beer in Bosnia and Herzegovina is lager, drunk in over 95% of the cases. Popular brands are:

- Preminger
- Nektar
- Tuzlanski pilsner
- Sarajevsko pivo
- Erster

=== Major Breweries ===
- Sarajevo Brewery - Sarajevska pivara
- Tuzla Brewery - Pivara Tuzla
- Bihać Brewery - Bihaćka pivovara
- Banja Luka Brewery - Banjalučka pivara
- Mostar Brewery - Hercegovačka pivovara
