= List of shopping malls in Bosnia and Herzegovina =

This is a list of shopping malls in Bosnia and Herzegovina.

== Banja Luka ==
- Boska (1978)
- RK Kastel (1982)
- Zenit (2001)
- Mercator Centar Banja Luka (2008)
- Fis (2012)
- Emporium (2015)
- Retail Park Cajavec (2015)
- Hiper Kort (2016)
- Delta Planet Banja Luka (2019)
- Bingo Plus (2022)

== Bihać ==
- Bingo (2014)
- Fis (2014)

== Bijeljina ==
- Fis (2004)
- Emporium (2005)
- Bingo (2012)
- Tom (2013)
- Bijeljina City Mall (2019)

== Brčko ==
- Bingo (2007)
- Fis (2008)
- Brčko City Park (2022)
- Kort Centar (2025) (Note: Opened in 2008 as Mercator Centar Brčko, reopened in 2025)

== Bugojno ==
- Fis (2013)
- Bingo (2014)
- TC Rose (2014)

== Čapljina ==
- Mercator Centar Čapljina (2008)

== Doboj ==
- Bingo (2011)
- Doboj City Park (2024)

== Doboj South ==
- Bingo (2010)
- Fis (2016)

== Istočno Sarajevo ==
- Bingo (2015)

== Goražde ==
- Bingo (2015)

== Gračanica ==
- Bingo (2004)
- Fis (2005)
- Etna Shopping Centar (2008)
- Belamionix (2017)

== Livno ==
- Fis (2009)

== Lukavac ==
- Bingo (2005)
- VF (2005)
- Omega (2008)

== Maglaj ==
- Wisa (2007)
- Bingo (2019)

== Mostar ==
- Shopping Centre Mostar (2001)
- Shopping Centre Rondo (2003)
- Mercator Centar Mostar (2006)
- Piramida (2009)
- Bingo (2011)
- Mepas Mall (2012)
- Fis (2016)
- Hercegovinapromet (2017)
- Shopping Centre Plaza (2020)

== Prijedor ==
- Wisa (2005)
- Bingo (2010)

== Sarajevo ==
- Mercator Ložionička (2000)
- Wisa Shopping Center (2000)
- Mercator Centar Dobrinja (2005)
- BTC Merkur Otoka (2006)
- ARIA Centar (2009) (Note: Until 2022 known as BBI Centar)
- Alta Shopping Center (2010)
- Importanne Center (2010)
- Sarajevo City Center (2014)
- Bingo Plus (2015) (Note: Opened in 1999 as TC Intershop, renamed in 2015)
- Bingo City Center Sarajevo (2020)
- Bingo City Center Ilidža (2024) (Note: Opened in 2009 as Grand Centar Ilidža, reopened in 2024)
- Bingo Plus Stup (2025) (Note: Opened in 2008 as Merkur, sold to Bingo in 2016, reopened in 2025)

== Tešanj ==
- Wisa (2001)
- Shopping Centar Jelah (2003)
- Mepromex Tešanjka (2023)
- Bingo (2014)

== Travnik ==
- VF (2003)
- Bingo (2008)

== Trebinje ==
- Bingo (2015)

== Tuzla ==
- Mercator Centar Tuzla (2004)
- Bingo City Center (2016)
- RK Tuzlanska (2001)

== Vitez ==
- GMS Shopping Center (2000)
- Fis (2003)
- Franšizni centar Bosne i Hercegovine (2008)

== Zenica ==
- Bingo (2007)
- Zenica City Center (2008) (Note: Formerly known as Shopping City Džananović)
- VF (2010)

== Žepče ==
- Libertas (2009)
- Fis (2016)

== Zvornik ==
- Zvornik City Park (2023)

== See also ==
- List of supermarket chains in Bosnia and Herzegovina
