= Petrakijina Street =

Street in Sarajevo, Bosnia and Herzegovina

- Interactive map of Petrakijina Street
- Native name: Petrakijina ulica (Bosnian)
- Length: 220 m (720 ft)
- Location: Sarajevo, Bosnia and Herzegovina
- Postal code: 71000
- East end: Pehlivanuša Street
- West end: Mehmed-paše Sokolovića Street

Other
- Known for: Austro-Hungarian villas, Winter Olympics Museum

Petrakijina Street (Bosnian: Petrakijina ulica; Serbo-Croatian Cyrillic: Петракијина улица) is a historic street located in the Stari Grad municipality of Sarajevo, Bosnia and Herzegovina.

== History ==
The street was named after Petar "Petrakija" Petrović, a merchant of Greek-Albanian origin and former deputy mayor of Sarajevo. Originally named Petrakijina in 1904, it was renamed Nikola Tesla Street on 8 June 1948. The original name was restored on 24 August 1993.

In the early 20th century, specifically between 1903 and 1904, four notable Austro-Hungarian villas were constructed along Petrakijina Street: Villa Mandić, Villa Heinrich Reiter, Villa Hermine Radisch, and Villa Forstrath Miklau. These villas were recognized as national monuments by the Commission to Preserve National Monuments of Bosnia and Herzegovina in 2009.

== Austro-Hungarian villas ==
=== Villa Mandić ===
Designed by Czech architect Karel Pařík and completed in 1903, Villa Mandić was built for lawyer and politician Nikola Mandić. The villa showcases eclectic architectural elements, including a prominent façade with columns and a tympanum.

In 1984, the villa became home to the Sarajevo Winter Olympics Museum, commemorating the 1984 Winter Olympics held in Sarajevo. The museum was officially opened on 8 February 1984, coinciding with the opening day of the Olympics.

During the Siege of Sarajevo in 1992, the museum was destroyed. Efforts to restore the building began in 1998, and after extensive renovations, the museum was reopened on 8 October 2020.

=== Other villas ===
Alongside Villa Mandić, the street features other significant Austro-Hungarian villas:

- Villa Heinrich Reiter
- Villa Hermine Radisch
- Villa Forstrath Miklau

== Education ==
The First Bosniak Gymnasium (Bošnjačka gimnazija), one of the most prestigious secondary schools in Bosnia and Herzegovina, is located on Petrakijina Street. Founded in 1992, the building it occupies is a historic Austro-Hungarian structure.

== Development ==
In July 2020, the Stari Grad municipality initiated a renovation project for Petrakijina Street, including the installation of new asphalt over a 220-meter stretch.

== Gallery ==
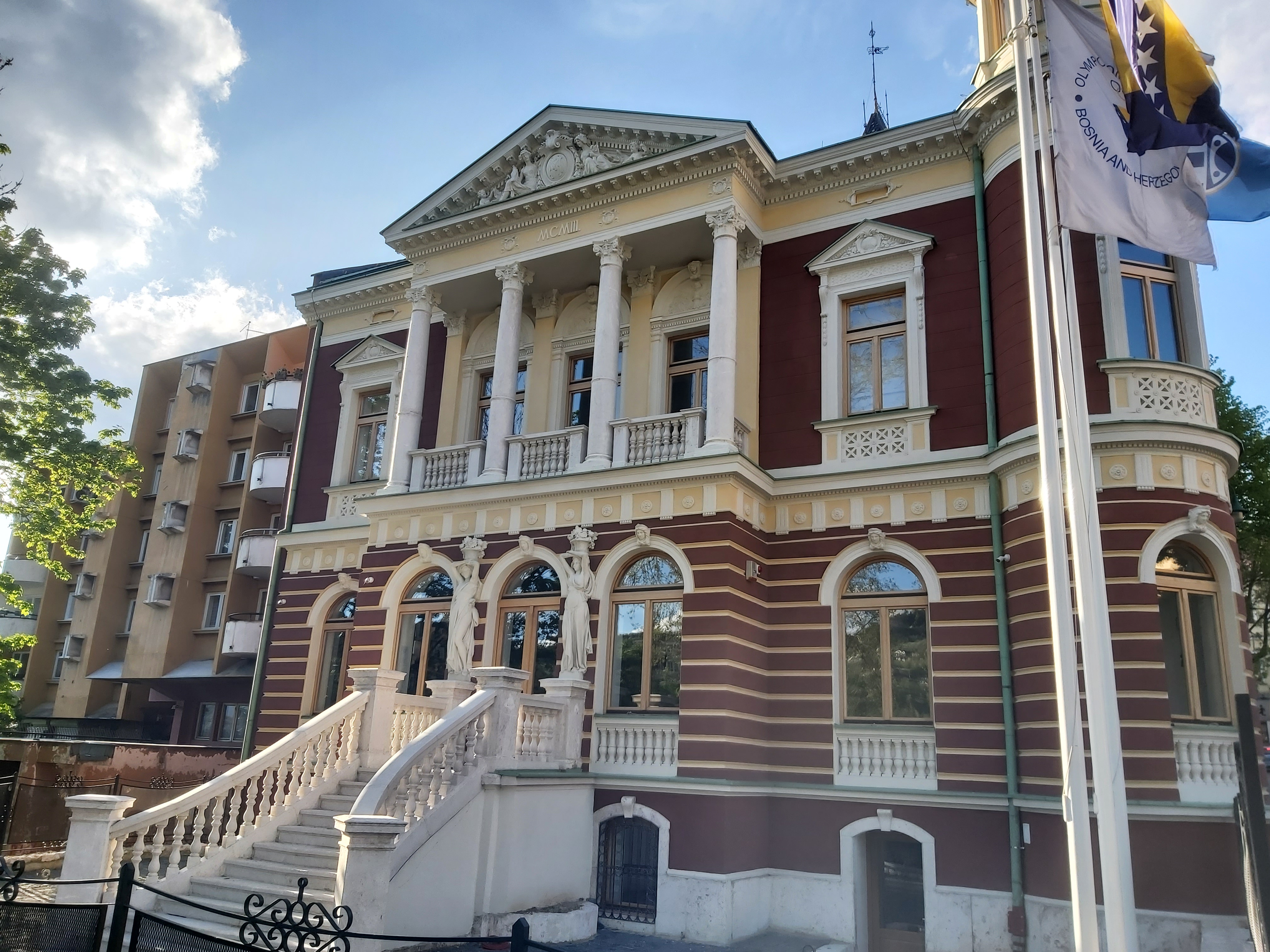
Villa Mandić

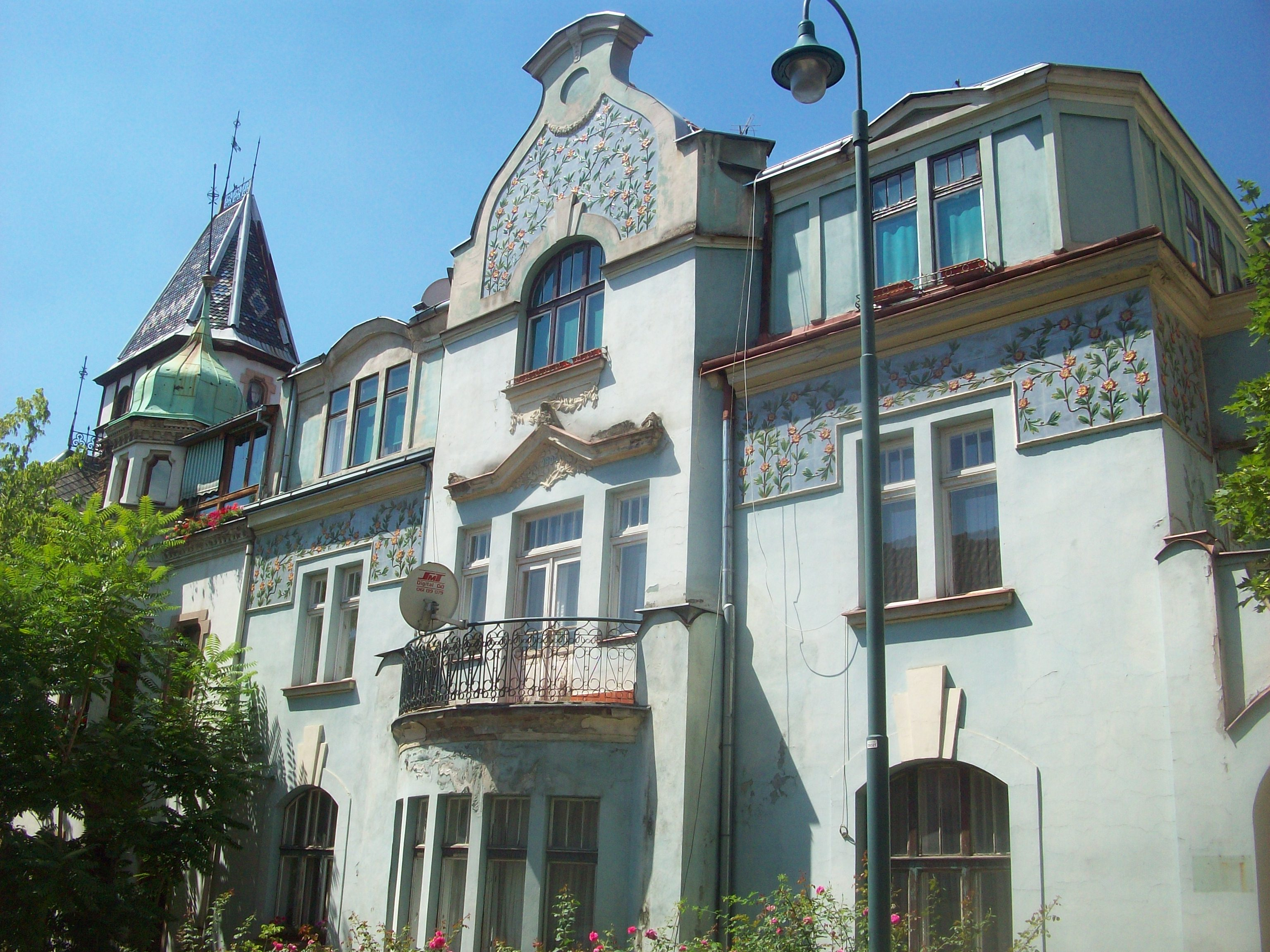
Villa Rädisch

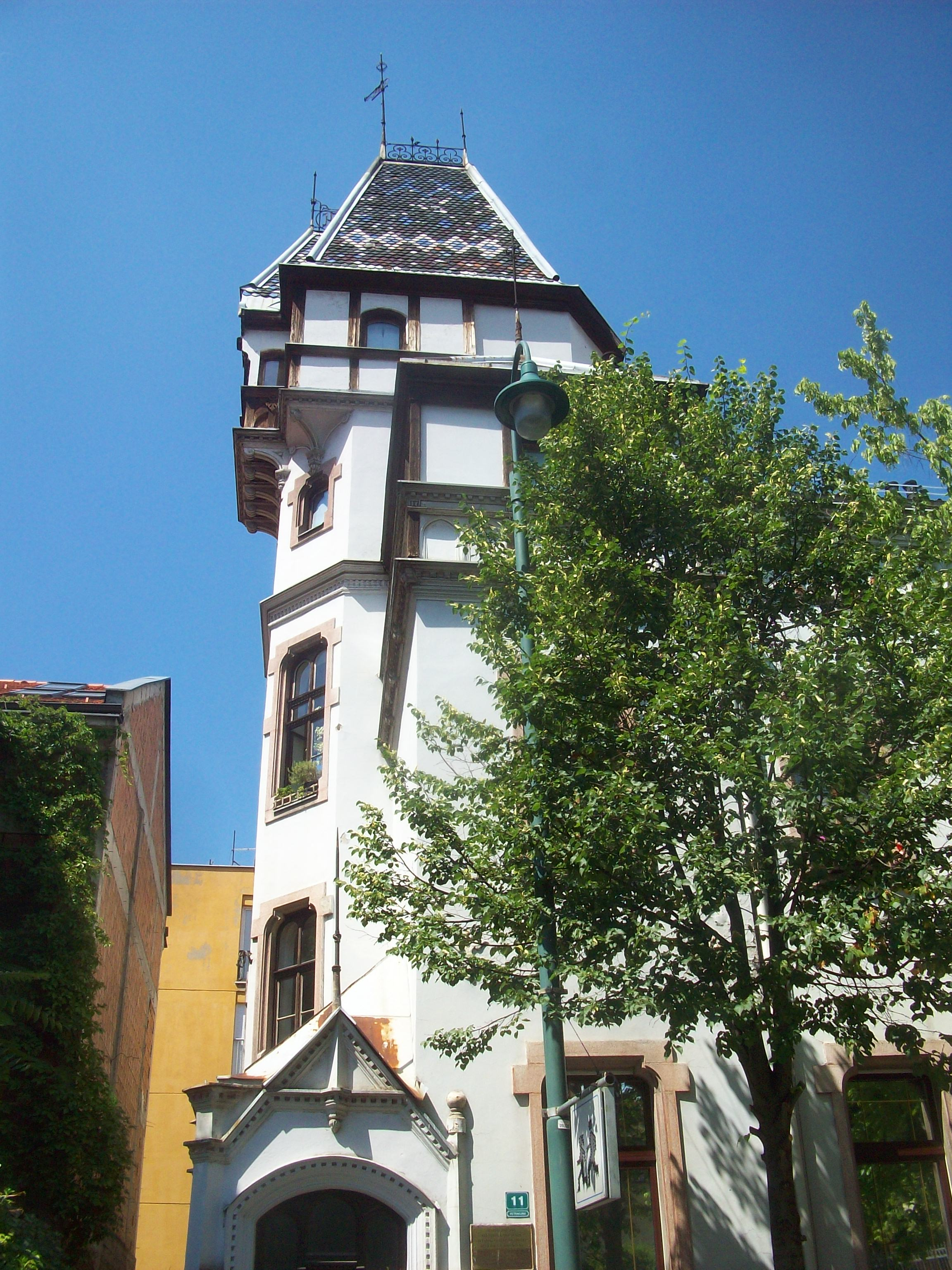
Villa Reiter

== See also ==
- Sarajevo Winter Olympics Museum
- Karel Pařík
- Stari Grad, Sarajevo
