= Dormeo =

Mattress and sleep products brand

- Product type: Mattress and sleep products brand
- Current owner: Dormeo AG (trademarks); various national operators
- Country: Slovenia
- Introduced: 2002
- Markets: Europe, North America, Asia
- Previous owners: Studio Moderna

Dormeo is a brand of mattresses and sleep related products. The brand was initially marketed in Central and Eastern Europe and was later distributed in other European markets, North America and Asia. Following the financial difficulties and eventual bankruptcy of Studio Moderna in 2023, the Dormeo trademarks were sold separately and the brand's operations became divided among companies in different countries.

== History ==
Dormeo was launched in 2002 as a mattress brand of Studio Moderna, with its mattresses initially manufactured in Italy. Studio Moderna sold the products through television shopping, catalogues, call centres, e-commerce and retail stores. By 2018, production was outsourced to factories in Italy, Spain, Poland and China.

Romania became one of Studio Moderna's larger markets after the company entered the country in 2002. In 2017, its Romanian subsidiary reported turnover of 261 million lei, with Dormeo mattresses and Delimano kitchen products, and more than 40 Dormeo and Top Shop outlets.

Dormeo products use Octaspring technology, a patented foam spring system in which individual foam springs are used in place of steel coils. During the 2010s, Octaspring components were manufactured in Belgium, while conventional Dormeo mattresses continued to be produced in Italy. Dormeo entered the North American market in 2012, establishing a headquarters and distribution centre in Plano, Texas. In 2013 the company opened a manufacturing facility in Winchester, Virginia, for Octaspring components. In the same year, Dormeo Octaspring sponsored Channel 4's Bedtime Live and a weather segment on Daybreak in the United Kingdom.

In 2015 Sinomax USA, which already supplied Dormeo with pillows, mattress toppers and foam components, acquired an undisclosed equity stake in Dormeo N.A. The Winchester facility was subsequently closed. In 2017, Octaspring technology was used in aircraft seat cushion designs developed by Vanema, Boxmark, Studio Moderna and Stelia. The technology was recognized at the Crystal Cabin Awards, where an Octaspring-based seat cushion received an award in the Material and Components category. In 2019 Vanema's Octaspring aircraft seating was shortlisted for the Seating Award at the International Yacht & Aviation Awards.

In 2018, Studio Moderna Brands products were sold in about 30 countries, including Australia and Japan, and were distributed through retailers such as Mattress Firm in the United States and Sleep Country Canada.

In 2023, ownership of the Dormeo brand changed following the restructuring of Studio Moderna and the administration of its UK subsidiary, Dormeo UK Ltd. Dormeo products are marketed by Dormeo Home d.o.o. and other companies operating independently of the former Studio Moderna group. In October 2025, Dormeo held a "dream job" contest at its Dormeo Home store in AFI Cotroceni, Bucharest, in which the winner received €1,000 for sleeping on and testing the company's products.

In May 2026, Dormeo presented the Dormeo AI Simulator, a system developed by the company that uses a questionnaire on sleeping habits to generate a personal sleep profile and recommend a mattress. The simulator is available in Dormeo Home stores and was presented in partnership with Slovenian electronics retailer Big Bang at its store in BTC City, Ljubljana.

== Products ==
Dormeo products include mattresses, mattress toppers, pillows, duvets and bed linen. The range includes all-foam, pocket-sprung and memory-foam mattresses, as well as models using Octaspring technology. The brand has produced mattresses and toppers in a range of designs and materials, including foam-spring constructions intended to provide support and ventilation.

== See also ==
- Studio Moderna
- Memory foam
