= Angellika Morton =

American model

Angellika Morton began as a straight size model and transitioned to plus-size modeling in 1997. In 1999, she became the first model to be inducted into the International Model Hall of Fame.

== Career ==
Angellika started modeling in Washington DC during the mid 1980s as a straight size model. Eventually, she ended up with Ford as a plus size model. She has done photo shoots for Talbots, Chatherines, Lane Bryant, Evans, Ulla Popken, Just My Size and others.

== Awards and honors ==
- In 1998, she was the first model to appear on two consecutive MODE covers and she has appeared on three covers in total.
- In June 1998, she was one of the models on the runway at the first Lane Bryant runway show.
- In 1999, she was the first model inducted into the International Model Hall of Fame.
