= Meister-Anker =

German watch and clock brand

A Meister-Anker electronic digital clock

The vacuum fluorescent display of a Meister-Anker digital clock

Meister-Anker is a German brand of watches and clocks. It was introduced in 1968 as a private label of the mail order company Quelle, which did not make watches itself but had them produced by other manufacturers, many of them in East Germany.

== History ==
Quelle launched Meister-Anker as its own brand in 1968. The watches were made by various firms, among them Bernhard Förster of Pforzheim, the state-owned Glashütter Uhrenbetriebe (GUB) in Glashütte, the Uhren- und Maschinenfabrik Ruhla in Ruhla, and the Swiss Fabrique d'Horlogerie SINDACO of Locarno-Muralto.

The East German watch factories in Glashütte and Ruhla produced mainly for export, and much of their output went to West Germany. Only a small share reached shops in East Germany itself, where Glashütte watches in particular were almost impossible to obtain. (After German reunification, GUB became the company that now makes Glashütte Original watches.) Mail order companies and department stores were among the largest buyers, and usually sold the watches under their own names; Quelle's watches mostly carried the Meister-Anker logo on the dial. Ruhla exported large numbers of watches to the West in return for hard currency. In 1969 the factory developed a chronograph with a greatly simplified mechanism of only eleven parts. Quelle's 1976 catalogue offered this Ruhla chronograph as a bargain for 45 marks, when the cheapest chronograph with a conventional movement cost 159 marks.

The watches were inexpensive. Besides Quelle's own catalogue, they were also sold through the Neckermann catalogue and in Tchibo shops, and for a time in watch shops in East Germany.

After the insolvency of Quelle's parent company, Arcandor, in 2009, Quelle's numerous private labels were sold to other companies. Meister-Anker went to K – Mail Order Invest of Pforzheim, the owner of the mail order company Versandhaus Klingel.
