= Pedro del Hierro =

Spanish fashion designer

- Born: Pedro del Hierro; 3 October 1948; Madrid, Spain
- Died: 3 April 2015 (aged 66); Madrid, Spain
- Occupation: Fashion designer
- Label: Pedro del Hierro

Pedro del Hierro (October 3, 1948 - April 3, 2015) was a Spanish fashion designer. He founded the Pedro del Hierro retail clothing brand and store chain, now part of Tendam.
