= Pedro del Hierro (brand) =

Spanish clothing company

- Company type: Public
- Industry: Luxury goods
- Founded: 1974; 52 years ago
- Founder: Pedro del Hierro
- Headquarters: Madrid, Spain
- Number of locations: 300
- Area served: Worldwide
- Key people: Nacho Aguayo (Creative Director); Alex Miralles (Creative Director); Jaume Miquel (CEO)
- Products: Apparel and footwear; Department store; Other specialty
- Operating income: €1,154,700 (2017)
- Parent: Tendam

Pedro del Hierro, also known as Del Hierro, is a Spanish fabrics and clothing company specialising in high-end, luxury cashmere and wool products, stablished in 1974 by Spanish designer Pedro del Hierro.

As of 2023, there are 390 Pedro del Hierro stores, of which 299 are in Spain, 61 in Portugal, and eight in Mexico.
