= Sarajevo Winter Olympics Museum =

Coordinates: 43°51′37.3″N 18°25′21.9″E

- Olimpijski muzej Sarajevo
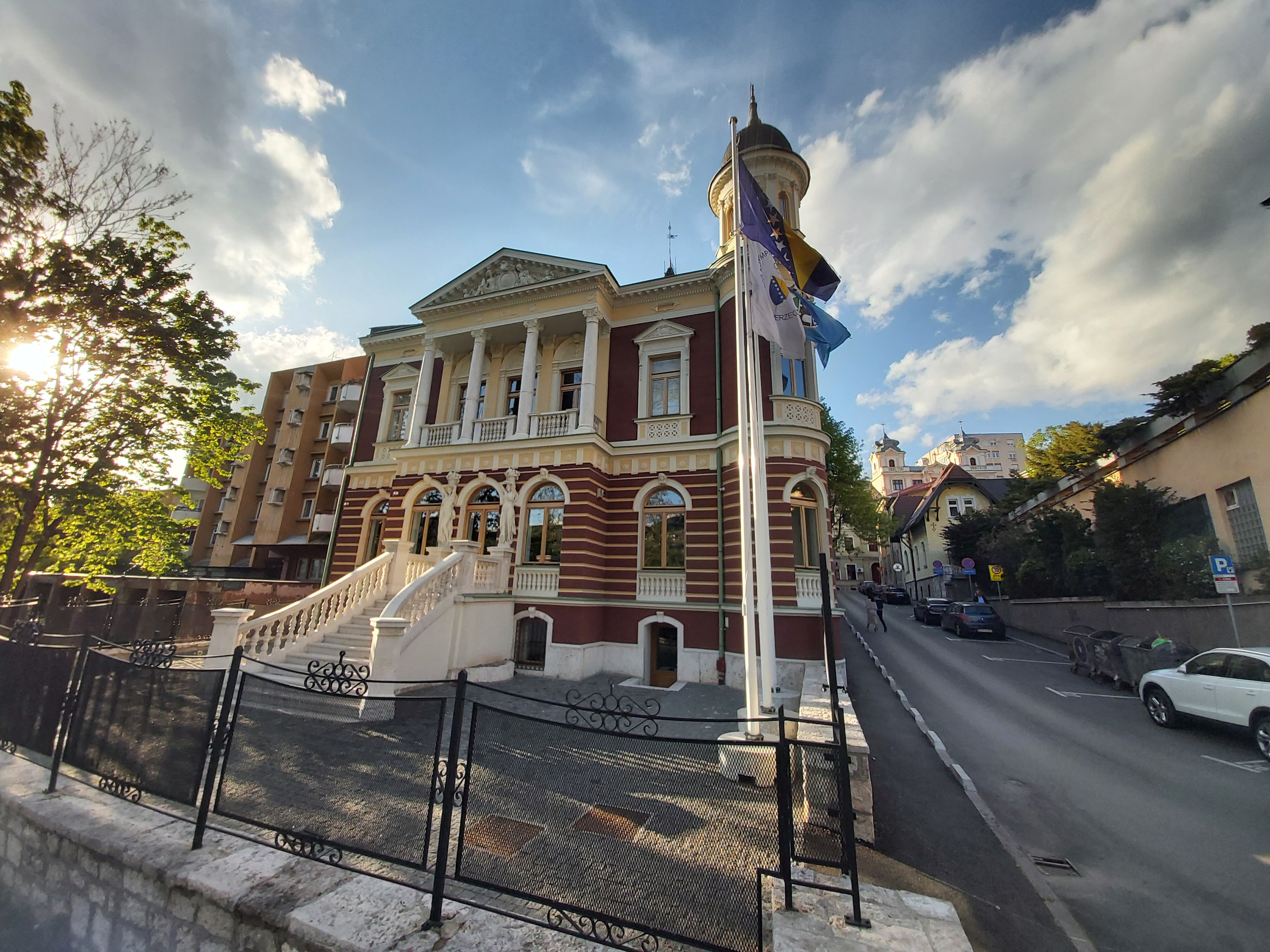
- Former name: The Mandić Villa
- Established: 1984
- Location: Petrakijina street, Sarajevo, Bosnia & Herzegovina
- Type: Olympic museum
- Director: Edin Numankadić
- Architect: Karel Pařík
- Nearest parking: On site
- Website: https://okbih.ba/

The Sarajevo Winter Olympics Museum is a museum dedicated to the XIV Winter Olympic Games and the XIV European Youth Olympic Winter Festival that were both held respectively in 1984 and 2019 in Sarajevo.

It was founded by the decision of the Organizing Committee of the XIV Winter Olympic Games with the desire to permanently preserve the memory of the organization and the Olympic event. The museum opened on February 8, 1984.

The museum realized more than 300 thematic programs from 1984 to 1992. The museum was destroyed on April 27, 1992, during the Siege of Sarajevo. Saved artifacts were transferred to a new Olympic museum that opened in 2004 on the 20th anniversary of the Winter Olympic Games in Sarajevo which is located in the Zetra Olympic Hall.

On October 8, 2020, the museum was reopened and had new features from the 2019 Winter Olympic youth festival that was held in Sarajevo and East Sarajevo.

== History ==
The building of the Olympic Museum, the “Mandić Villa”, was built for the lawyer in Sarajevo, Nikola Mandić in 1903, according to the project of Karel Pařík. It used to be the seat of the American Consulate, and more recently of the City Committee of SC Sarajevo. The Villa was built on the very edge of the slope with a beautiful view of the city according to the pattern of the courts and palaces of the aristocracy. It is connected to the Markale market and the center of Sarajevo by a series of stairs. Behind it peeks the tower of the villa of Heinrik Reiter, one of the directors of the brewery in Sarajevo, which was also designed by Pařík at the same time as Mandić's villa was built.

In the presence of the president of the International Olympic Committee, Juan Antonio Samaranch, the museum was officially opened on February 8, 1984, on the opening day of the XIV Winter Olympics in Sarajevo. On April 27, 1992, the museum was destroyed and a majority of its artifacts were lost in the fire.

In January 1998, academician Ivan Straus developed a "Project for the reconstruction and new functional organization of the Museum of the XIV Winter Olympic Games in Sarajevo", and later the conceptual design. Based on this, in December 1999, architect Dragan Bijedić and civil engineer Vladimir Savković, within the designer firm "Architect", made a detailed design called "Olympic Academy Sarajevo, a design for the remediation of the construction." The realization of this project began in 2000, which put the facility on the list of cultural assets of special national interest for BiH. It is for this reason that the Institute for the Protection of Monuments monitored the activities, both in the design and in the implementation of the designed solutions.

Although the renovation of the museum lasted from its devastation in 1992 until today in very difficult socio-economic conditions, it was successfully completed, primarily because of the Olympic Committee of BiH, Olympic Solidarity, the City of Sarajevo, but also the wider community.
