= Versandhaus Klingel =

Former German mail order company

Klingel
- Type: GmbH & Co. KG
- Industry: Mail order, online retail
- Founded: 1923
- Founder: Robert Klingel
- Defunct: January 31, 2024
- Fate: Insolvency
- Headquarters: Pforzheim, Germany
- Revenue: over €1 billion (2017)
- Number of employees: over 2,200 (2021)

Klingel (legally, in its final years, K – Mail Order GmbH & Co. KG) was a German mail order and online retailer based in Pforzheim. Founded in 1923, it specialised in fashion and other goods for "best agers", customers aged roughly 55 to 70. The group filed for insolvency in May 2023 and ceased trading on 31 January 2024.

== History ==
=== Origins ===
The company was founded in Pforzheim in 1923 as Robert Klingel GmbH + Co. KG, named after its founder, Robert Klingel. The Kohm family took over the business three years later. It initially sold high-quality textiles, above all fabrics.

Fritz Kohm (born 1882) joined the Nazi Party on 1 December 1931. His son Willy Kohm (1913–1995), the company's authorised signatory (Prokurist), joined on 1 February 1940.

The original company building was destroyed in the bombing of Pforzheim during the Second World War. In 1953 the head office moved to Sachsenstraße 23 in Pforzheim's Nordstadt district.

=== Kohm family ownership ===
The business remained in the hands of the Kohm family. Willy Kohm's sons Joachim and Andreas Kohm became managing partners in 1975 and 1978 respectively. The general partner of the German company, K – Mail Order Verwaltungs GmbH (formerly Robert Klingel Verwaltungs GmbH), was registered in Horn, in the Swiss canton of Thurgau.

In 1993 Klingel took over the activities of the Dutch mail order company Ter Meulen Post, formerly part of the Rotterdam department store chain Ter Meulen. It bought the name, the customer address list and much of the company's inventory, and kept 55 of the remaining 100 staff.

In July 2012 Klingel announced that it would market its customer addresses to other companies exclusively through AZ Direkt, a subsidiary of Bertelsmann. Under the "list privilege" provision of German data protection law at the time, this did not require customers' consent. In 2020 the company stopped selling real fur and joined the Fur Free Retailer Program.

=== Insolvency and closure ===
In early May 2023 the main company, K – Mail Order GmbH & Co. KG, applied to open insolvency proceedings under self-administration. The company blamed a double-digit fall in sales, worse than the industry average, and the disruption caused by a change of IT systems in the second half of 2022. No investor could be found for the group as a whole. At the end of August 2023 the creditors' committee decided that the business would close, with the online and catalogue sales channels kept running until the end of January to sell the autumn and winter collection. About 1,300 jobs in Pforzheim were lost, in addition to some 300 employees who had already resigned during the insolvency proceedings.

The group's brands were sold off separately. The rights to the Klingel brand itself went to the mail order company Bader at the end of 2023. The company ceased trading on 31 January 2024. In April 2024 the Mannheim public prosecutor's office opened an investigation into suspected insolvency offences.

== Brands ==
At the time of its closure the group comprised 14 mail order brands and 23 private labels. Besides Klingel itself, its brands included Wenz, Mona, Babista, Diemer, Happysize, Miamoda, Meyer Mode, Vamos and Wellsana. Several were sold to other companies during the insolvency:

- Alba Moda (women's fashion), to the Goldner Fashion Group, with effect from 1 February 2024
- Babista (menswear), to Vanderstorm Ventures, a company owned by Tobias Kohm, with effect from 1 November 2023
- Diemer (jewellery), to the Göde group, with effect from 1 February 2024
- Happy Size (plus-size fashion), to the Popken Fashion Group, with effect from 1 January 2024
- Mona (women's fashion and shoes), to Bader, with effect from 15 January 2024
- Vamos (shoes), to Weltbild, with effect from 31 January 2024
