= Hercegovina Osiguranje =

Hercegovina Osiguranje (Croatian for Herzegovina Insurance) is an insurance company based in Mostar, Bosnia and Herzegovina which mainly serves the country's Croat community. It was formed in 1998.

The firm is active in all municipalities in the country with a Croatian majority, as well as a few where a large Croatian minority is present. It is one of the few insurance firms in the nation which is ISO 9000 certified .
