= Tendam =

Spanish fashion company

- Industry: Retail
- Headquarters: Madrid, Spain
- Area served: mainly Spain and Portugal, presence in further 77 countries all around the world
- Key people: Jaume Miquel, CEO
- Products: Clothing
- Revenue: € 1.154,7 millions (2017)
- Number of employees: 10,291 (2017)
- Subsidiaries: Cortefiel; Springfield; Women's Secret; Pedro del Hierro
- Website: www.tendam.es

Tendam (formerly The Cortefiel Group) is a Spanish fashion retailer. Tendam is present in 79 countries with 1,462 directly operated stores and 594 franchises, a total of 2,056 points of sale.

== History ==
Tendam started out in 1880 as a family-run haberdashery store on Calle Romanones in Madrid. The business moved into textile production and distribution, and in 1933 the company built the La Palma shirt factory. It was followed in 1945 by the tailoring factory, which in 1946 produced the first men's suits under the Cortefiel label. In 1954, and coinciding with the founding of Manufacturas del Vestido, the firm became a holding company.

The Group continued to grow during the 1980s with the creation of the men's tailoring brand Milano (1984) and its casual youth fashion brand, Springfield (1988). In 1989 the firm acquired Pedro del Hierro, and in 1993 launched women'secret, its underwear and swimwear brand created by and for women.

During the 1980s work also got underway on the diversification of the Group's retail formats. Its international expansion strategy dates back to 1993, although the period of fastest growth was registered between 2000 and 2003, when the sales surface area handled by the Group increased by more than 70%. In 2005 MEP Retail acquired a stake in the Group, bringing about a change in the share ownership and management team. This same period also saw a sharp rise in the Group's global franchise business.

The women'secret online store was launched in 2000, and 2010 saw the consolidation of the Group's ecommerce area with the creation of the SPF.com online store, followed by further online stores from Pedro del Hierro, Cortefiel and Fifty Factory.

The Group has a network of international buying offices in Spain, Hong Kong and India. Distribution is centralised at the Madrid logistics platform, backed up by an additional centre in Hong Kong, supplying both the Group's own stores and franchises. The multibrand growth strategy has been further reinforced through international expansion and the development of the online channel.

== Brands ==
Tendam brands include as of 2023:

| Brand | No. of stores July 2023 | | | | Year founded |
| Brand | Worldwide | Spain | Portugal | Mexico | Year founded |
|---|---|---|---|---|---|
| Women'secret | 753 | 325 | 65 | 26 | 1993 |
"A brand created by and for women. Today, it is present in 67 countries and at 772 points of sale."
| Springfield | 685 | 283 | 63 | 23 | 1988 |
For "young, urban cosmopolitan" men and since 2006 also for women)
| Cortefiel | 461 | 298 | 60 | 26 | 1945 |
The first brand created by Tendam, which was originally called Grupo Cortefiel since its inception in 1945. It is aimed at men and women, 35–45.
| Pedro del Hierro | 390 | 299 | 61 | 8 | 1974 |
Created by Madrid designer Pedro del Hierro, became part of Tendam in 1989 and owned by the group since 1992.
| Dash and Stars | 0 | 0 | 0 | 0 | February 2022 |
Sustainable… women's sports clothing and activewear. 8 corners in Cortefiel, Springfield and Women'secret stores in Spain.
| Hi&Bye | 0 | 0 | 0 | 0 | 2023 |
Aimed at girls 14–18. It features vibrant colours and designs for everyday including underwear sets in lace and cotton, ribbed tops, sweatshirts and swimming costumes (swimsuits). Colours currently include vibrant lilac, pink, blue, and classic black, white and grey for underwear. Sold in corners of Women'secret stores.
| High Spirits | 0 | 0 | 0 | 0 | March 2021 |
For women 18–35. The brand is available in Spain and Portugal in some Springfield stores.
| Hoss Intropia | 0 | 0 | 0 | 0 | February 2021 |
Tendam acquired the Hoss, Intropia and Hoss Intropia brands as part of their receivership process in November 2019. "Brand for the cosmopolitan woman… A quality, modern product with a personality and… identity… all its own."
| OOTO | 0 | 0 | 0 | 0 | September 7, 2022 |
Sold at 70+ Cortefiel points of sale in Spain and Portugal and via cortefiel.com.
| SlowLove | 0 | 0 | 0 | 0 | March 2021 |
Available online.
| Fifty (factory outlets ) | 70 | 53 | 10 | 2 | |
Outlet for merchandise from Tendam brands as well as Milano, Only and Pieces, Vero Moda, Levi's and Jack and Jones, Selected and Dockers. Stores in Spain, Portugal, 2 in Mexico, 1 in Bosnia and Hercegovina, and 2 in Serbia, plus online sales. Formerly marketed as "Fifty Factory".
| Total | 2,359 | 1,258 (53%) | 259 (11%) | 83 (3.5%) | |

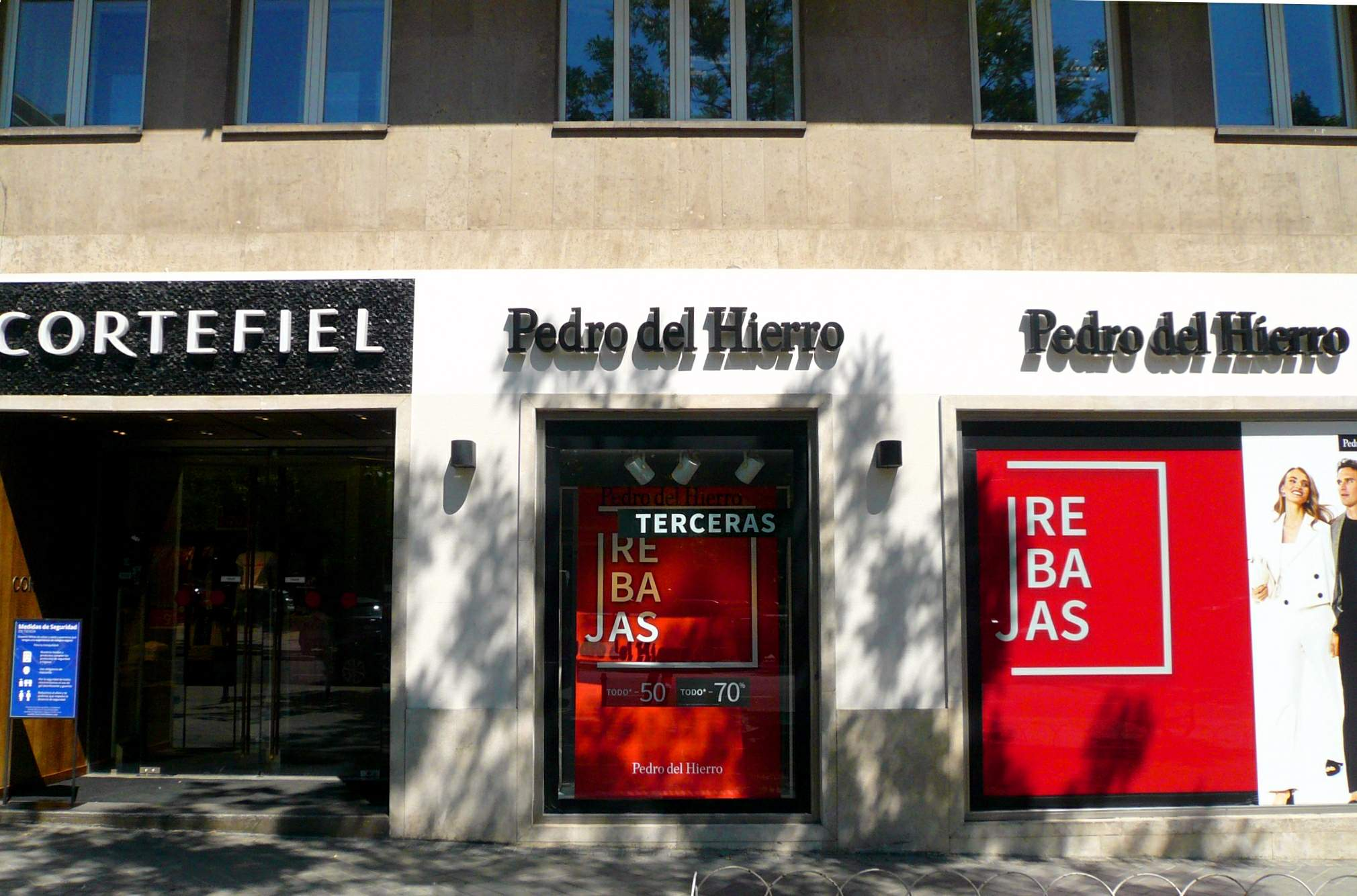
Tendam stores on the Paseo de la Castellana in Madrid

Each brand has its own design team as well as sales and management structure. They share the administration, finance, technology, expansion and sourcing and human resource divisions, as well as other corporate functions, based at the central offices in Madrid.

== Stores and international presence ==
Tendam brands’ are present in 86 countries with 1,990 physical points of sale and 47 online markets in 2023 across five continents: Europe, North and South America, Asia, and Africa. International expansion is based on two management models: The proprietary management model allows Tendam to operate in an integrated business in which the complete management of the market is controlled. The franchise model is managed through franchisees specialized in the distribution sector, with extensive knowledge of their local markets and financial capacity to develop their brands. Tendam has a large presence especially in Spain and Portugal. As of April 2023, Tendam has 67 stores in Mexico, 30 in Ecuador of which 15 are Women'Secret, and stores in Paraguay and Venezuela as well.
