= Doğtaş =

Doğanlar Mobilya Grubu
- Type: Public
- Traded as: BİST: DGNMO
- Industry: Furniture
- Founded: 1972 (Doğtaş); 1935 (Kelebek Mobilya)
- Founder: Hacı Ali Doğan (Doğtaş)
- Headquarters: Düzce, Turkey
- Area served: Worldwide
- Key people: Davut Doğan (Chairman); İsmail Doğan (CEO)
- Products: Home furniture, mattresses, kitchen & bathroom sets
- Owner: Doğanlar Holding
- Number of employees: 1,200+
- Parent: Doğanlar Holding
- Subsidiaries: Doğtaş, Kelebek Mobilya, Lova Yatak, Ruum Store
- Website: www.doganlarmobilyagrubu.com

Doğanlar Mobilya Grubu (formerly known as Doğtaş Kelebek Mobilya) is a Turkish furniture manufacturer and retail company. Operating under Doğanlar Holding, the company manages multiple brands including Doğtaş, Kelebek Mobilya, Lova Yatak, and Ruum Store. It is listed on Borsa Istanbul.

== History ==
=== Kelebek Mobilya (1935–2012) ===
Kelebek Mobilya was established in 1935 in Istanbul upon the directive of Mustafa Kemal Atatürk to manufacture specialized plywood for aircraft wings. The company continued its plywood manufacturing under the Kelebek brand in Haliç, Istanbul, until 1986. In 1978, the company opened a modular furniture factory in Düzce. Kelebek became a publicly traded company on the Istanbul Stock Exchange in 1990.

=== Doğtaş (1972–2012) ===
Doğtaş was founded in 1972 as a small woodworking and furniture workshop by Hacı Ali Doğan in Biga, Çanakkale. Over the following decades, managed by the Doğan family, the workshop expanded into a national furniture brand and eventually formed the foundation of Doğanlar Holding.

=== Merger and Rebranding (2012–Present) ===
In 2012, Doğtaş acquired a controlling stake in Kelebek Mobilya. Following the acquisition, the combined corporate entity was named Doğtaş Kelebek Mobilya San. ve Tic. A.Ş.

In December 2021, the company officially changed its corporate title to Doğanlar Mobilya Grubu İmalat Sanayi ve Ticaret A.Ş. to consolidate its growing portfolio of sub-brands under a single corporate identity.

== Operations and Brands ==
The group manufactures modular furniture, kitchen and bathroom fittings, and mattresses primarily at its 40,000-square-meter indoor manufacturing plant located in Düzce. The company operates in both domestic and international markets, maintaining flagship stores in regions including Europe, the Middle East, and North America (via Doğtaş USA).

The primary brands operated by the group are:

- Doğtaş – Focused on living room, bedroom, and dining furniture.
- Kelebek Mobilya – Focused on modular furniture, kitchen, and bathroom designs.
- Lova Yatak – Specialized in mattresses and sleep solutions.
- Ruum Store – An e-commerce brand offering flat-pack modular furniture.
