= Carpisa =

Italian Manufacturer and retailer

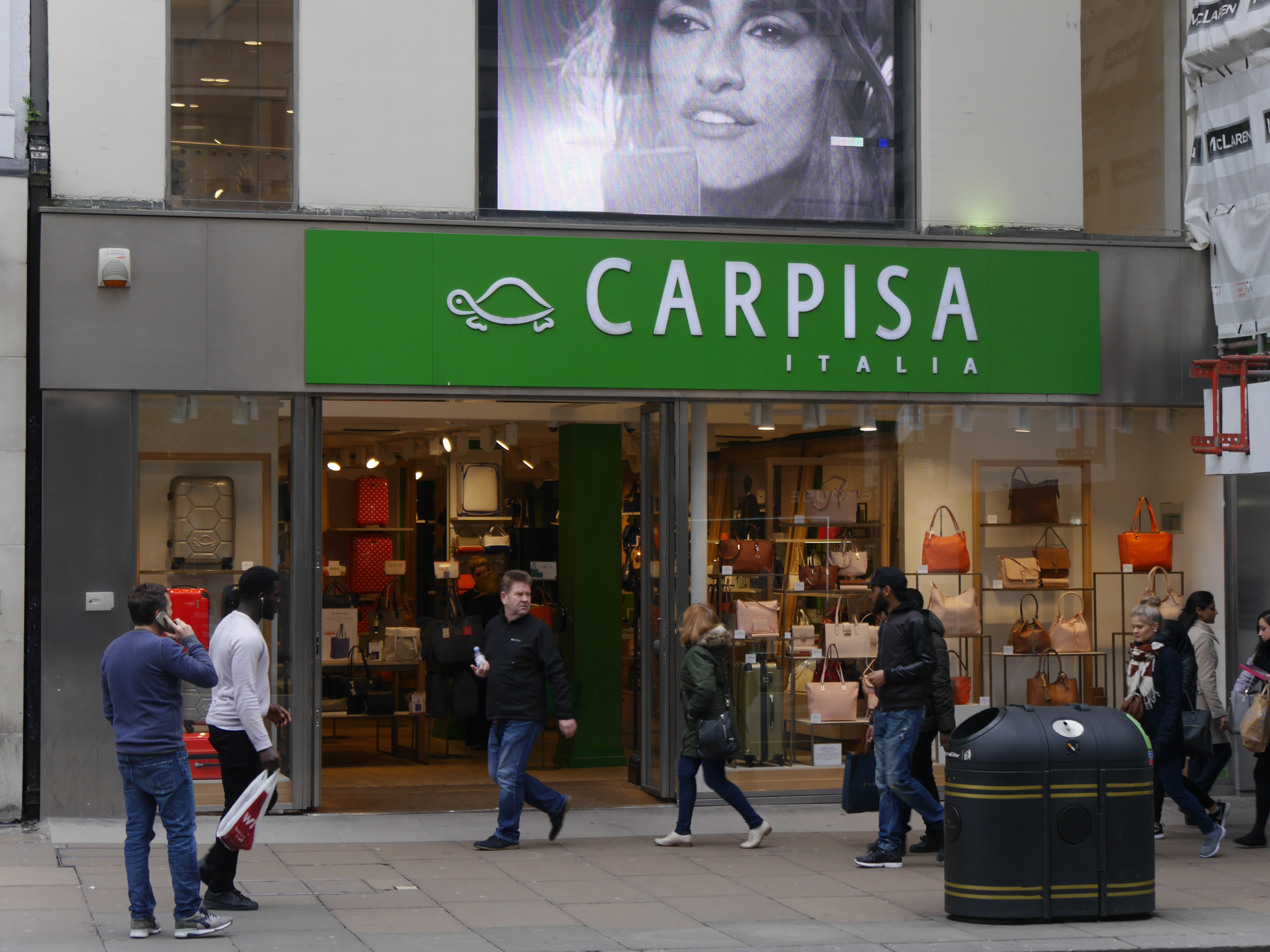
Carpisa, Oxford Street, London, 2016

Carpisa is an Italian manufacturer and retailer of luggage, handbags, wallets and accessories, with over 600 outlets worldwide.

Carpisa was founded in 2001, is owned by Kuvera SpA, and has a "franchise network of more than 600 stores in Italy and abroad". Carpisa has been called a "fast fashion brand".

The headquarters building of over 10,000 square meters, the CasaCarpisa, is located in the Nola Interporto, in Nola, Italy.
