= Villa Mandić (Sarajevo) =

Coordinates: 43°51′37″N 18°25′22″E

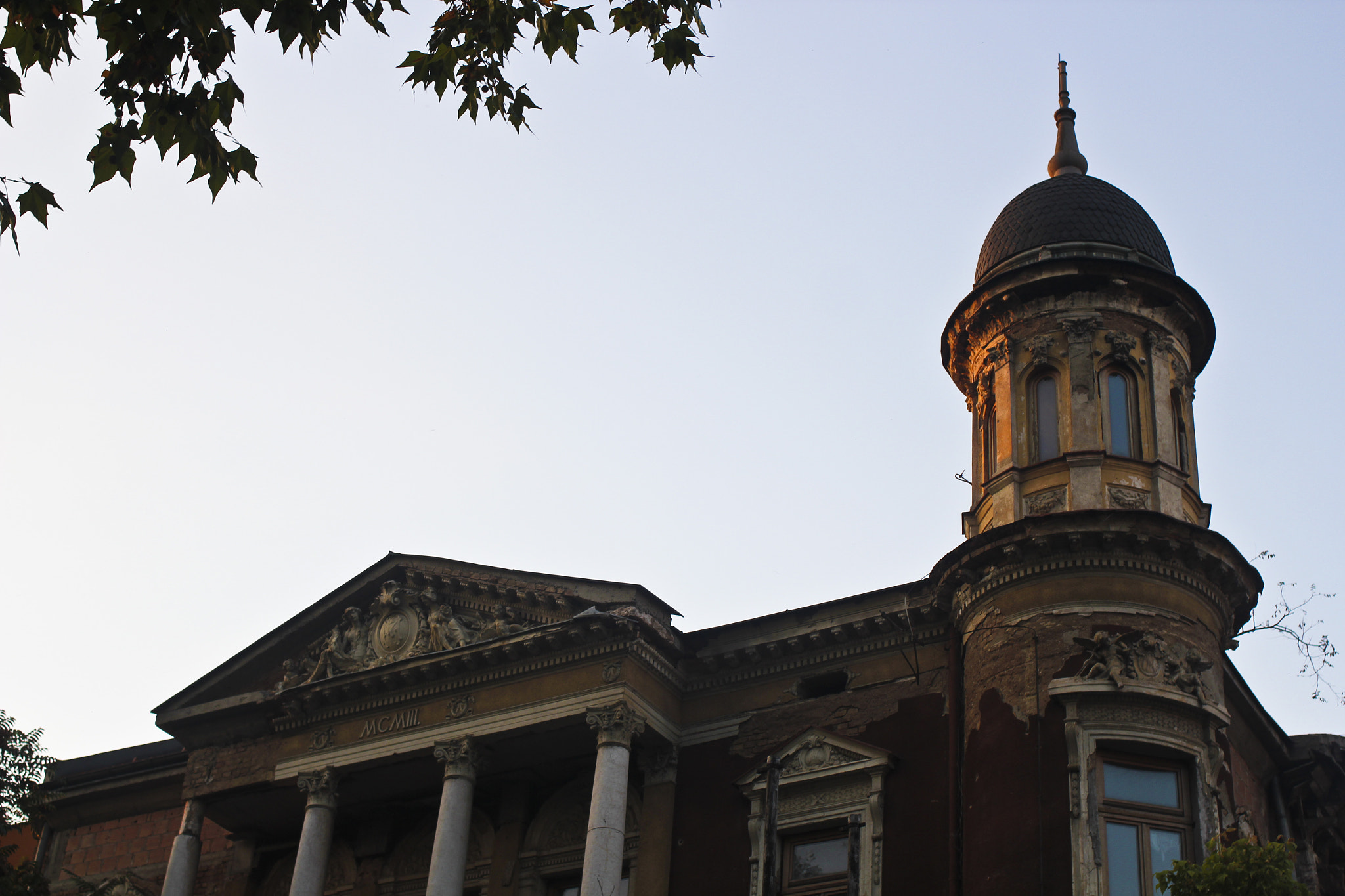
Vila Mandić

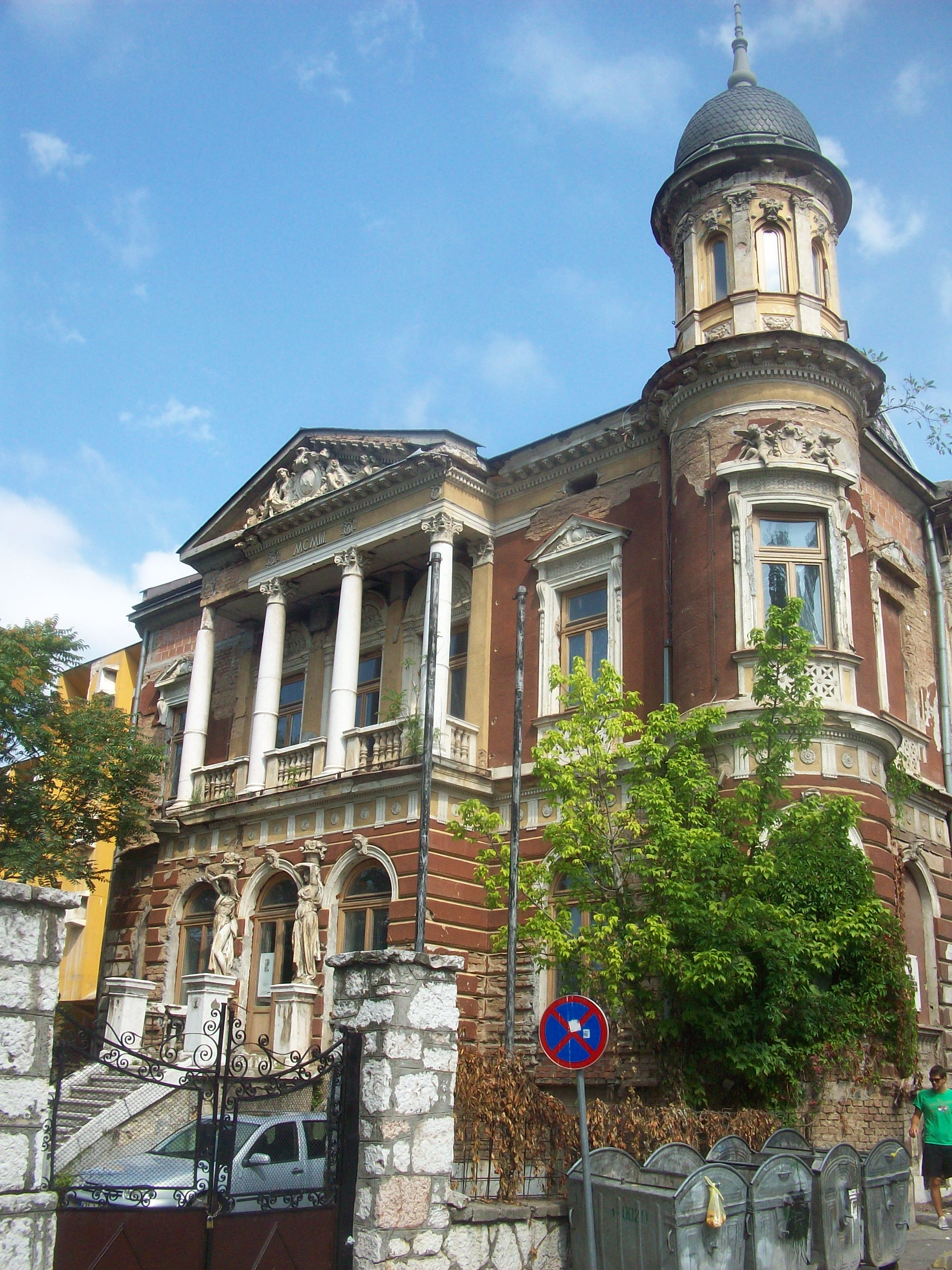

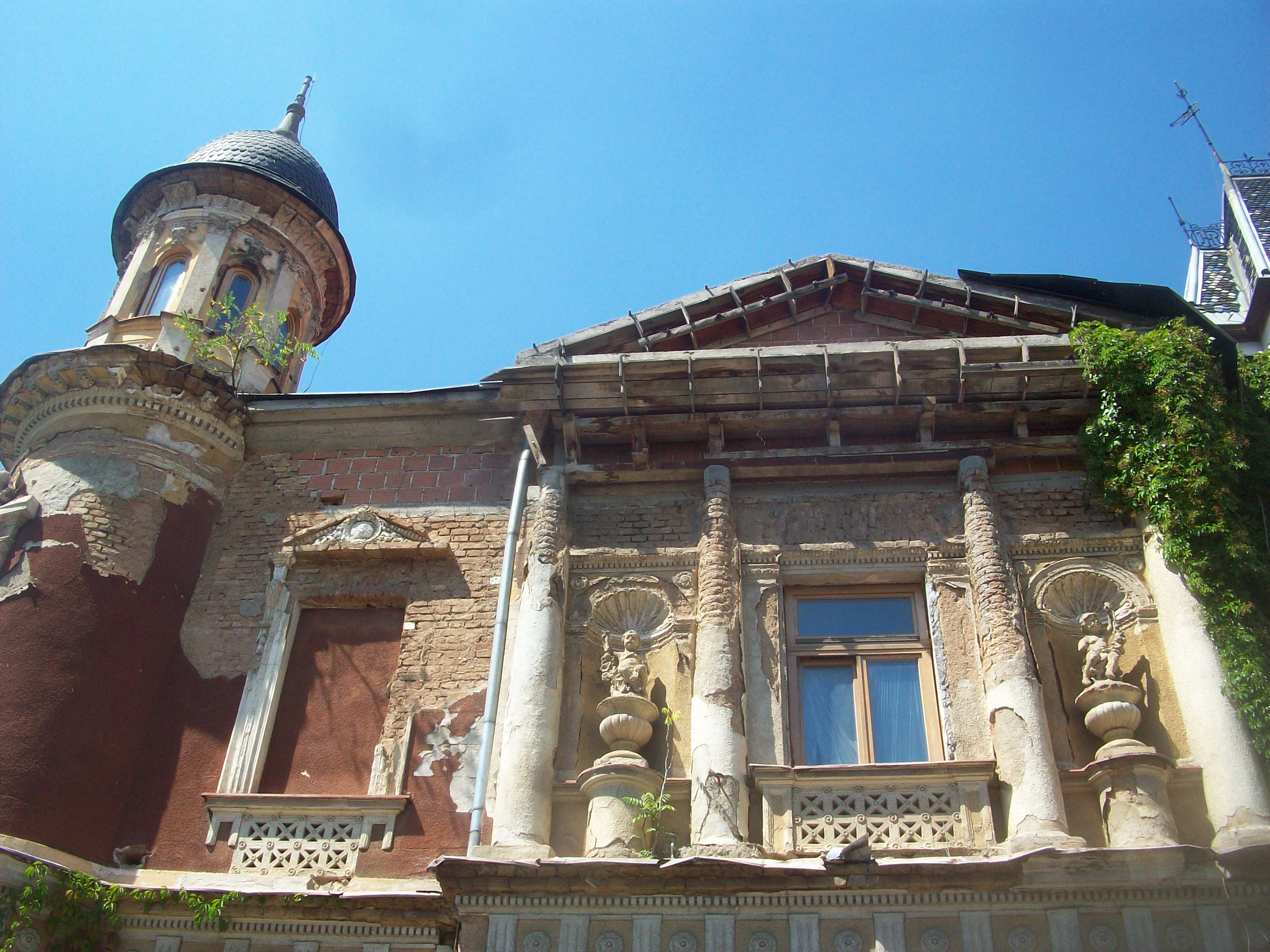

Villa Mandić is an eclectic-style villa located in the Petrakijina Street in Bosnia and Herzegovina's capital Sarajevo.

Together with the nearby villas (villa Reiter, villa Rädisch, villa Miklau) it was declared National Monument in 2009.

== History ==
The villa was completed in 1903 for the then politician and lawyer Nikola Mandić. It was designed by Czech architect Karel Pařík, who at the turn of the 19th and 20th centuries devoted himself to extensive modernization and Europeanization of the then still oriental-looking town of Sarajevo. The magnificent multi-storey villa has a number of historical elements; striking façade with columns and tympanum, monumental entrance, windows with shambles etc.

In 1945 the villa was nationalized and put into use as a consulate of the United States of America. Eventually it became seat of the municipal committee of the Union of Communists of Sarajevo.

Since 1984 the villa has housed a museum dedicated to the Olympic Games held in the Bosnian capital. The exhibition was carried out in a similar way to the Olympic Museum in Lausanne, Switzerland. Between 1984 and 1992 there were 300 different exhibitions devoted to sport.

During the siege of the city during the war in the first half of the 1990s, the building was damaged by grenade launchers and severely damaged. The villa was one of the first buildings to be bombarded; as a result, in April 1992 the Museum employees moved a large part of the exhibits into the cellars of the Zetra sports hall. The Olympic Museum has been located in this hall since 2004.

After the war, the villa was one of the few historic buildings that had not undergone extensive reconstruction, despite the fact that in 1998 a rehabilitation project was implemented, which was officially launched in 2000. It is currently a cultural monument, along with several surrounding villas (vila Heinricha Raithera, vila Hermine Radisch & vila Forstratha Miklaua). The renovation of the building was only completed in the second half of 2018 and is expected to be completed in January 2019. The city of Sarajevo donated 100,000 convertible marks to the museum's restoration.

== See also ==
- Karel Pařík
- Architecture_of_Bosnia_and_Herzegovina#Austro-Hungarian_period
