= Coffee Fellows =

German coffeeshop chain

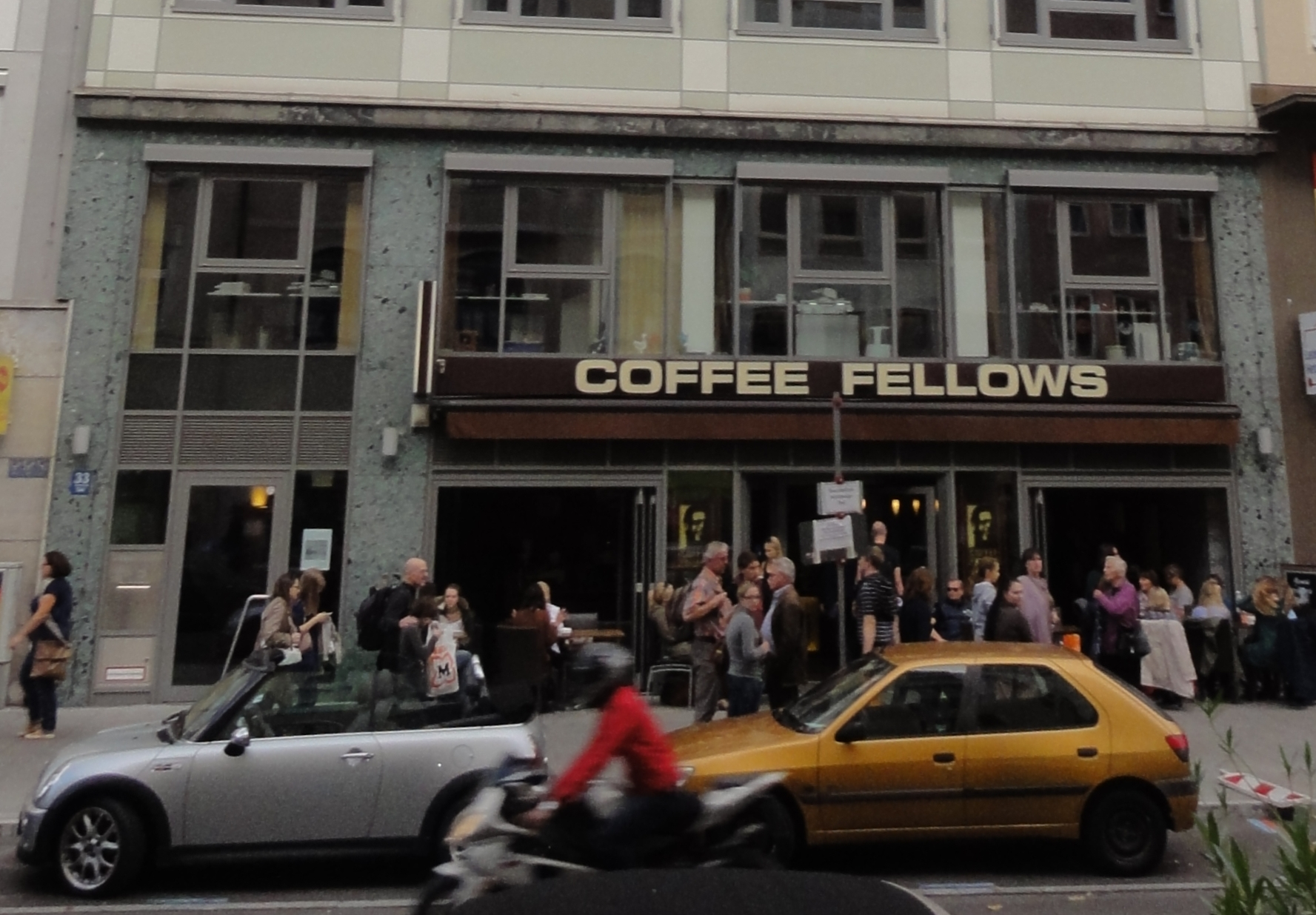
- A branch of Coffee Fellows in Munich
- Industry: Coffee shop
- Founded: 1999; 27 years ago
- Founder: Kathrin Tewes
- Headquarters: Germany
- Number of locations: 239
- Website: coffee-fellows.com

Coffee Fellows is a German coffeeshop chain founded in 1999 in Munich, Germany, by Kathrin Tewes and co-managed by her and her husband, Olympic Gold medalist Stefan Tewes who joined her in management in 2000. As of 2018, they have about 209 stores in Germany, most of them franchised. They have over 240 stores in Europe and Asia.

== History ==
The idea of founding a coffee shop chain in Germany occurred to Kathrin Tewes after her stay in London and North America in the 1990s, where the concept of coffeeshops was already widespread. Along with her husband, she established Coffee Fellows based on the idea of offering a comfortable and agreeable environment for customers. The first store was opened on Leopoldstraße in 1999, which was followed by a second, albeit less successful location in Düsseldorf. However, another branch in Schützenstraße in Munich, which was also the company's first franchise location, developed more successfully.

In 2000, Kathrin's husband Stefan quit his job as a consultant for Roland Berger to work with his wife. By 2007, Coffee Fellows had grown to ten branches in Germany, and by 2011, there were already 40, mainly located in southern Germany. In the same year, the company took over 25 branches of the Coffeeshop Company, which were mainly located in shopping centres in eastern and northern Germany. Since then, the company has placed itself in the top 10 coffee shop chains in Germany.

In 2009, Coffee Fellows earned a Coffee Shop Award for the continuous improvements and further development of the concept as well as the whole management of the business. At the end of 2010, Coffee Fellows was running 36 shops, mostly in southern Germany, and the business planned to expand into northern Germany. In 2015, Tewes added 10 stores, and opened their 100th coffee shop in December 2015. This made them the third largest coffeeshop chain in Germany after McCafé and Starbucks.

In 2018, the network reached 200 coffee houses in Europe, and Coffee Fellows also opened its first hotel in Dortmund. Further hotels in Trier and Munich were added later. The following year, Coffee Fellows entered the Asian market for the first time with the opening of three branches in Mongolia.

On 8 January 2025, Coffee Fellows filed for bankruptcy in Belgium.

== Locations ==
As of July 2021, there is a total of 239 stores in the following countries:

Country	Number of stores
Austria	3
Belgium	3
Germany	224
Luxembourg	1
Netherlands	7
Spain	1
Switzerland	3
Mongolia	2
United States	3

The US stores are all in the Houston, Texas area.
