= Pivara Tuzla =

Brewing company

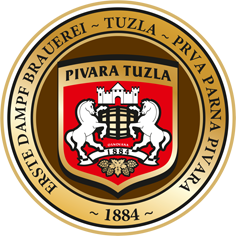
- Company type: Public
- Traded as: PITZ
- ISIN: BAPITZRK1005
- Industry: Beverages
- Founded: 1884; 142 years ago
- Headquarters: Tuzla, Bosnia and Herzegovina
- Key people: Fahrudin Salihović (CEO)
- Owner: Bingo Tuzla
- Number of employees: 209 (2020)
- Website: pivaratuzla.ba

Pivara Tuzla or Tuzla brewery, is a Bosnian brewing company founded in 1884, based in Tuzla, Bosnia and Herzegovina. It is the third oldest brewery in Bosnia and Herzegovina.

== History ==
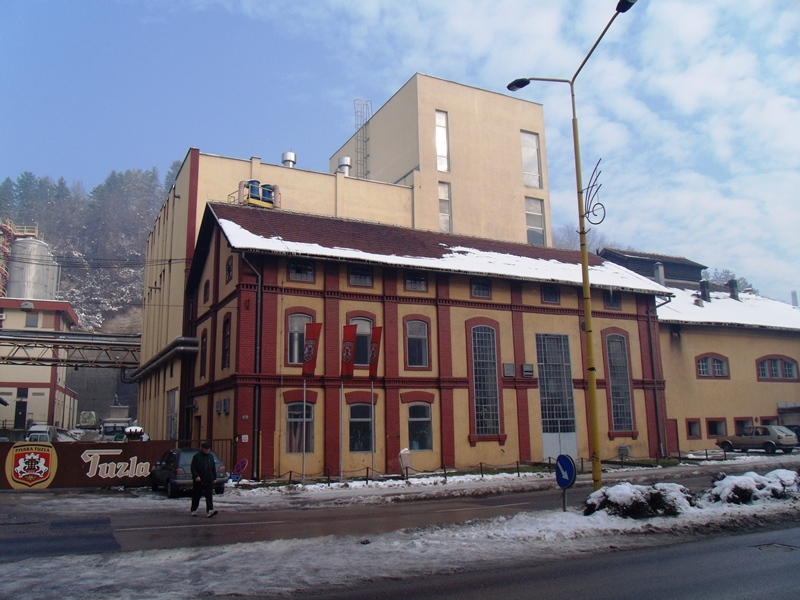
Tuzla Brewery

Pivara Tuzla was founded in 1884 under the name Erste Dampf Brauerei (The first steam brewery) Dolnja Tuzla, by Tasing and Köhn, who brought a Czech pilsner beer brewing technique. With the arrival of the Austro-Hungarian rule to the Tuzla area, industrial capacities were expanded.

Tuzla Brewery also owns a line of supplementary product programs installed at the end of the nineties, which is used for the production of soft drinks and mineral water.

== Brands ==
- Tuzlanski pilsner (pilsner)
- Erster beer (lager)
- Crno Premium beer (dark beer)
- Radler Premium beer (radler)
- Tuzlanski kiseljak (mineral water)
- Panonska Ledena (soft drink)
- Laganese (juice)
- Fenix (energy drink)
