= Robot (supermarket) =

Robot General Trading Co d.o.o.
- Trade name: Robot
- Native name: Robot d.o.o.
- Company type: Private
- Industry: Retail
- Founded: 1995 in Sarajevo; Bosnia and Herzegovina
- Founder: Selver Oruč
- Headquarters: Rajlovačka cesta 41, Sarajevo, Bosnia and Herzegovina
- Number of locations: ▲25 stores (September 2017)
- Area served: Bosnia and Herzegovina
- Products: Discount store Hypermarket; Supermarket; Wholesale/Distribution
- Net income: (2014)
- Number of employees: 1,500 (December 2015)
- Subsidiaries: _{Bira Bihać - home appliances factory Robot Commerce Split}
- Website: www.robot.ba

Robot General Trading Co d.o.o. is Bosnian domestic supermarket chain and group. The company's headquarters is located in Sarajevo, Bosnia and Herzegovina. It was founded in 1995 by Bosnian businessman Selver Oruč. The main activity of Robot is the production of household appliances through its own brand AWT – Appliance White Techniques (formerly known as BIRA Bihać) as well as trade, wholesale and retail of technical goods, consumer goods and food products. Robot sells merchandise through wholesale departments, and it was among the first companies in BiH that started to build modern shopping centers in major Bosnian cities.

In December 2015, Robot had 23 stores (Hypermarkets, Supermarkets or Shopping malls) opened in Bosnia and Herzegovina and more than 1,500 employees. The Group also operates in Croatia through the company "Robot Commerce" Split.

Robot Shopping Centar is usually formatted as large hypermarkets with additional facilities such as kids playground, cafes, boutiques and restaurants.
