= Bingo (supermarket) =

Bosnian supermarket chain

- Company type: LLC
- Industry: Retail
- Founded: 1993; 33 years ago
- Founder: Senad Džambić
- Headquarters: Bosanska poljana bb, Tuzla, Bosnia and Herzegovina
- Number of locations: 225 stores
- Area served: Bosnia and Herzegovina
- Key people: Ljiljana Kunosić, CEO
- Products: Grocery; Restaurant; General merchandise Convenience store Discount store Hypermarket; Supermarket; Wholesale/Distribution
- Revenue: €1.115 billion (2024)
- Net income: €74.65 million (2024)
- Total equity: €505.49 million (2018)
- Number of employees: 8,108 (December 2023)
- Subsidiaries: _{Interex BiH; Tuš trade d.o.o. BiH; Hekom d.o.o. Mostar; Wilson d.o.o. Sarajevo; Trgovina na veliko i malo d.o.o. Kalesija; MIP Management d.o.o. Čitluk; BINGO MIP d.o.o. Čitluk; Majevica d.d. Srebrenik; Kaletex d.o.o. Kalesija; Kvin d.o.o. Tuzla; Autosaobraćaj d.o.o.Tuzla; Tuzla-remont d.d. Tuzla; Transservis–trgovina d.o.o. Tuzla; Eko život d.o.o. Tuzla; Duka & Bosna d.o.o. Brčko; Novitet d.o.o. Bos. Petrovac}
- Website: bingotuzla.ba

Bingo (full name: Bingo import export Tuzla d.o.o.) is Bosnia's largest supermarket chain and the company with the highest revenue, profit, and number of employees in the Federation of Bosnia and Herzegovina, with its headquarters in Tuzla.

The company had 8,108 employees across 225 stores, generating a revenue of 1.94 billion BAM, and profit of 158.3 million BAM in 2023.

== History ==
Bingo was established in 1993 by Bosnian businessman Senad Džambić in Tuzla in 1992.

Džambić, the sixth child of a miner and an electrician by trade, had started some small-scale business in the 1980s: “Before the war, two brothers and I had some 120 beehives on a bus and could produce up to 30 tons of honey a year. In the nineties I worked in a mine, I also owned billiards, pinball machines and poker machines, since 1985 I have been doing that and a company was formed. Bingo comes from that time. Let's earn something, invest immediately".

In 2010, Bingo received an EBRD loan to support energy efficiency - the first of many other loans from European development banks.

In 2014, Bingo became the biggest domestic retail company in Bosnia and Herzegovina by acquiring companies Interex BiH and Tuš Trade BiH. Turnover in 2014 was higher than 500 million BAM.

In 2015, Bingo had 175 stores open in Bosnia and Herzegovina and more than 5,500 employees. The same year, Džambić (with a revenue of 258.9 million euros) was ranked by Forbes as the second-richest man in Bosnia and Herzegovina after Izudin Ahmetlić, owner of the Hifa Group.

After the collapse of Croatia's Agrokor holding, Džambić bought several of its subsidiary companies in Bosnia and Herzegovina. He also bought Tuzla's Majevica snack factory.

In 2017, Bingo became the largest supermarket chain in Bosnia and Herzegovina after the split between Konzum and Mercator in Bosnia and Herzegovina.

The same year, Džambić bought Tuzla's Dita factory, which had been self-managed by employees since the bankruptcy in 2014.

In 2018, Džambić rescued the company Tuzlanski kiseljak d.o.o. which was owned by Pivara Tuzla.

On 19 April 2024, Bingo opened its 225th store.

== See also ==
- List of companies of Bosnia and Herzegovina
