= Banjalučka Pivara =

Bosnian brewing company

Banjalučka pivara
- Type: Public
- Industry: Beverages
- Founded: 1873; 153 years ago
- Headquarters: Banja Luka, Bosnia and Herzegovina
- Key people: Nicholas Penny (President of the steering board); Ilija Šetka (General director)
- Products: Beers and lagers
- Revenue: ▲€23.40 million (2016)
- Net income: ▼€3.13 million (2016)
- Total assets: ▲€26.43 million (2016)
- Total equity: ▲€17.79 million (2016)
- Owner: Olvi
- Website: banjaluckapivara.com

Banjalučka pivara (or Banja Luka Brewery, Serbian Cyrillic: Бањалучка пивара) is a Bosnian brewing company based in Banja Luka, Bosnia and Herzegovina, the country's second-largest city. Founded as part of activities by the Trappist order in the village of Delibaša, the brewery was nationalized after World War II and in 1975 included in newly founded company "Bosanska Krajina".

145 years ago, in a small place beside Banja Luka, beside the Vrbas grove, a brave little Banja Luka brewery was created by the work of a trappist monk from the Marija Zvijezda monastery. The founder of this small brewery was Franz Pfanner, the leader of the Trappist Order in Banja Luka, who together with other monks, besides the brewery, also established a cheese factory to produce the famous Trappista cheese, as well as one of the first power plants in Europe, adhering to his modest lifestyle and chore "Pray and work" ("Ora et labora").

In 2025, the Finnish beer and non-alcoholic drinks producer Olvi announced its intention to buy the brewery then controlled by a European group. Besides allowing Olvi to expand into a new geographic area, the transaction could open new growth and export opportunities for the Bornean firm in the Balkans and the Mediterranean region.

On January 2, 2026, it was announced that the Finnish firm had completed the acquisition of Banjalučka pivara.

== Brands ==
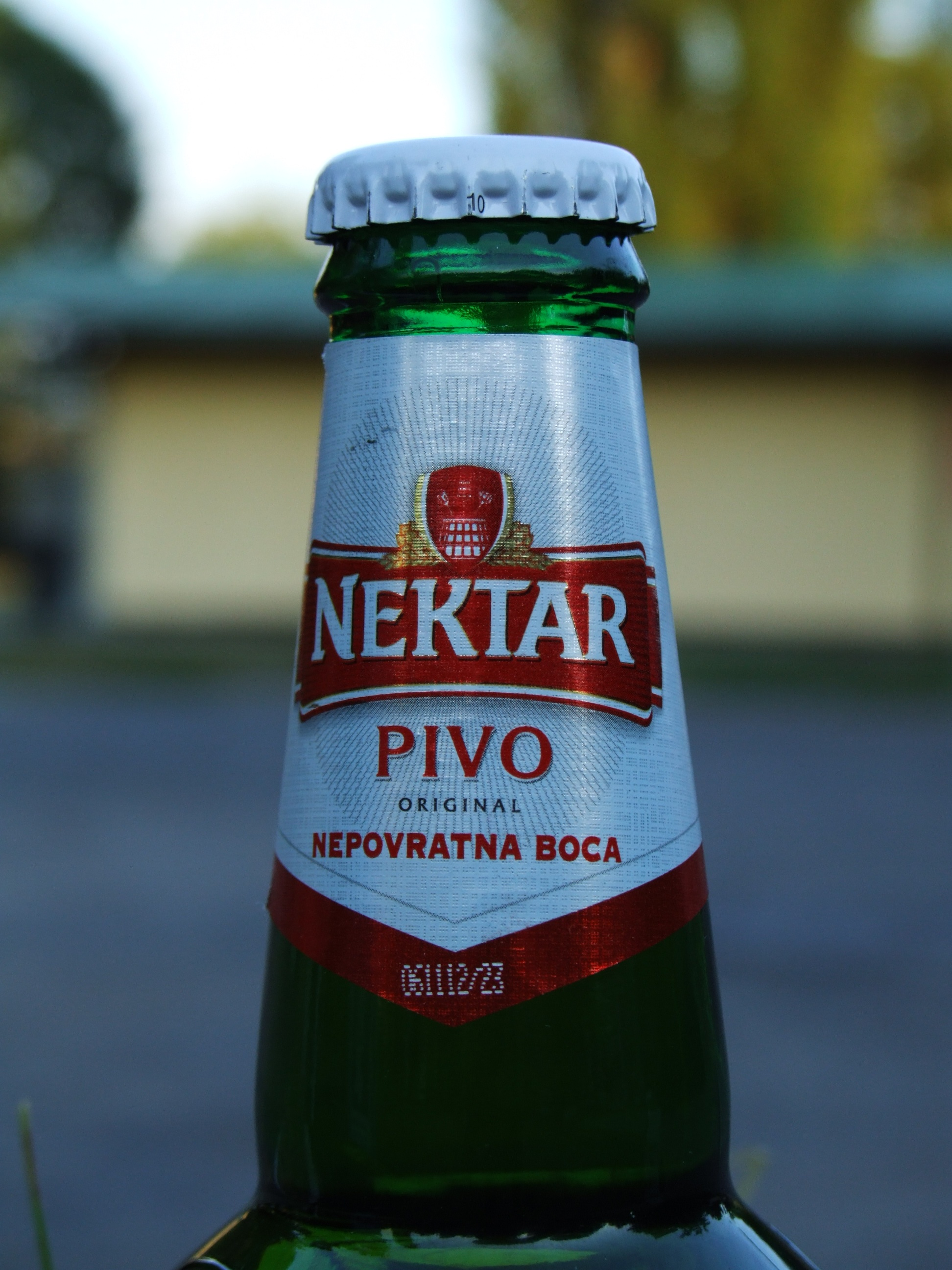
Nektar - beer from Banja Luka

- Nektar Pivo, lager beer
- Nektar Limun, shandy with flavour of lemon
- Nektar Grejp, shandy with flavour of grapefruit
- Nektar Crveni Grejp, shandy with flavour of red grapefruit
- Banjalučko pivo, lager beer
- Kaltenberg pivo, royal Bavaria beer
- Crni Đorđe pivo, dark beer named after Karađorđe
- Kastel pivo, lager
