= Bihaćka pivovara =

Bihaćka pivovara d.d.
- Type: Public
- Industry: Beverages
- Founded: 1990
- Headquarters: Bihać, Bosnia and Herzegovina
- Key people: Adem Ibrahimpašić (President of the steering board); Edin Ibrahimpašić (General director)
- Products: Beers, lagers, soft drinks and water
- Revenue: 19.622.771 BAM (2010)
- Operating income: 2.175.682 BAM (2010)
- Net income: 2.090.203 BAM (2010)
- Total assets: 47.889.291 BAM (06.2011)
- Website: www.preminger.ba

Bihaćka pivovara is a Bosnian brewing company based in Bihać, Bosnia and Herzegovina. They produce pale lager beer Preminger, and slightly lighter beer called Unski Biser. Since May 2007, the company has had a certified environmental management system according to DIN EN ISO 14001: 2004. Since June 2011, the company has introduced the HACCP system. Total revenue in the period from the complete privatization of the company in 2000 to today has doubled, profit has tripled, and the number of employees has increased by 40 percent.
