= Studio Moderna =

Studio Moderna Group is an omnichannel, multi-brand and direct-to-consumer retailer, primarily operating across Central and Eastern Europe.

In 2011, Studio Moderna launched Octaspring technology. and sold the first Dormeo mattress featuring Octaspring springs.
