= Ulla Popken =

German clothing retailer

- Company type: Clothing
- Industry: Clothing
- Genre: Women's Plus sizes
- Founder: Johann Popken
- Headquarters: Rastede, Ammerland, Germany
- Number of locations: 320+
- Key people: Ulla Popken; CEO: Thomas Schneider
- Products: Women's clothing

Ulla Popken is a German clothing retailer headquartered in Rastede. It specializes in Women's plus size clothing and sells these in more than 320 stores across Europe as well as in the United States through a biweekly 48-page catalog.

== History ==
In 1880, Johann Popken, the grandfather of Ulla Popken's husband Friedrich, founded a textile company in Hamelin. During the 20th century, his son Karl operated the business until he stopped in 1960 due to failing health. Eight years later, Karl's son Friedrich and his wife Ulla took over operations. In 1968, they opened the first specialty maternity shop in Oldenburg, Germany. By 1978, the company had three stores in Bremen, Hanover, and Hamburg.

In 1993, the company started marketing in the United States. After the launch of their online store in 1999, the company opened its first U.S. store in Towson, Maryland the following year. Ulla Popken's U.S. headquarters are located in Glen Arm, Maryland.

In 2008, Astrid Popken and her husband, Thomas Schneider, took over the management of Ulla Popken in Germany. In 2012, the Popken Fashion Group was created. Under this umbrella are four brands: Ulla Popken, Gina Laura, menswear label JP1880, and Studio Untold.
