= Sarajevska pivara =

Brewery in Bosnia and Herzegovina

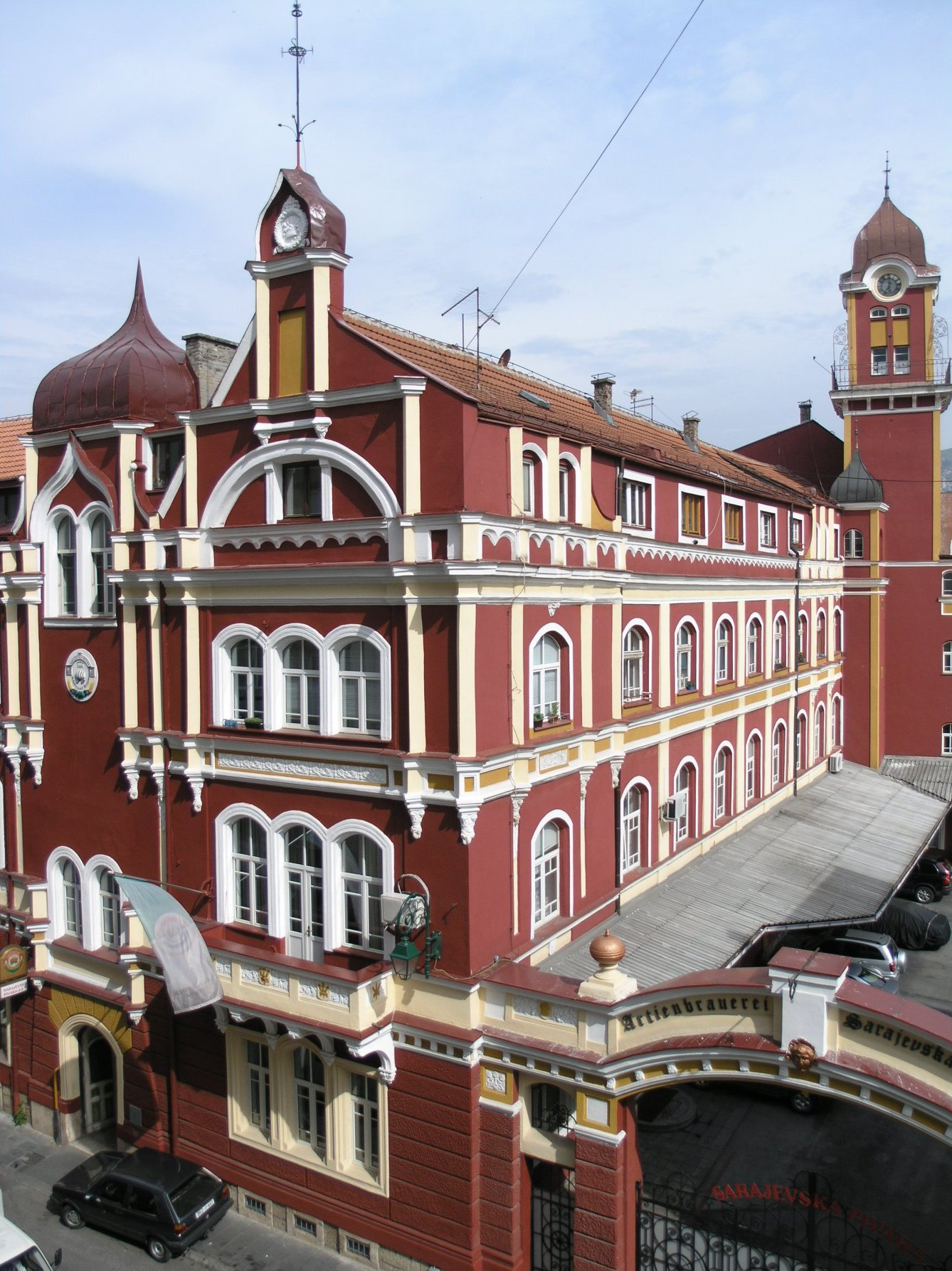
- Sarajevska pivara building erected 1881
- Company type: Public (SASE: SRPVRK1)
- Industry: Beverages
- Founded: May 24, 1864
- Headquarters: Sarajevo, Bosnia and Herzegovina
- Key people: Hilmo Selimović (President of the steering board)
- Products: Beers, lagers, soft drinks and water
- Revenue: 76,188 million BAM (2007)
- Number of employees: 320
- Website: Official Website

Sarajevska pivara or Sarajevo Brewery in English (SASE: SRPVRK1) is a Bosnian brewing company based in Sarajevo.

== History ==
The Sarajevska pivara opened in 1864 as the first local industry and shortly became one of the leading producers in Bosnia, with considerable amounts exported to Montenegro, Croatia and Albania. By 1903, the brewery was reported to brew 54,570 hectoliters annually, 86,485 hl in 1909 and 100,480 hl in 1910. Just before World War I, Sarajevska Pivara was producing 116,000 hl per year, and in 1916 it passed the limit of 150,000 hl.

Today's President of the Steering Board, Hilmo Selimović, was appointed to a position of Sarajevska pivara d.d. General Director on 1 August 1983. Since that period, Sarajevska Pivara had steady production growth, growing from 299,000 hectoliters in 1984 to 784,000 hectoliters in 1991. With these results, Sarajevska Pivara became one of the four leading companies in the former Socialist Federal Republic of Yugoslavia.

== Brands ==
- Sarajevsko, lager
- Sarajevsko Premium
- 0% beer
- Lejla voda

Licences:

- Pepsi
- Oettinger

== Museum ==
The brewery hosts a museum, explaining the company's history throughout Ottoman times, the Austro-Hungarian Empire, the Socialist Federal Republic of Yugoslavia and the War in Bosnia.

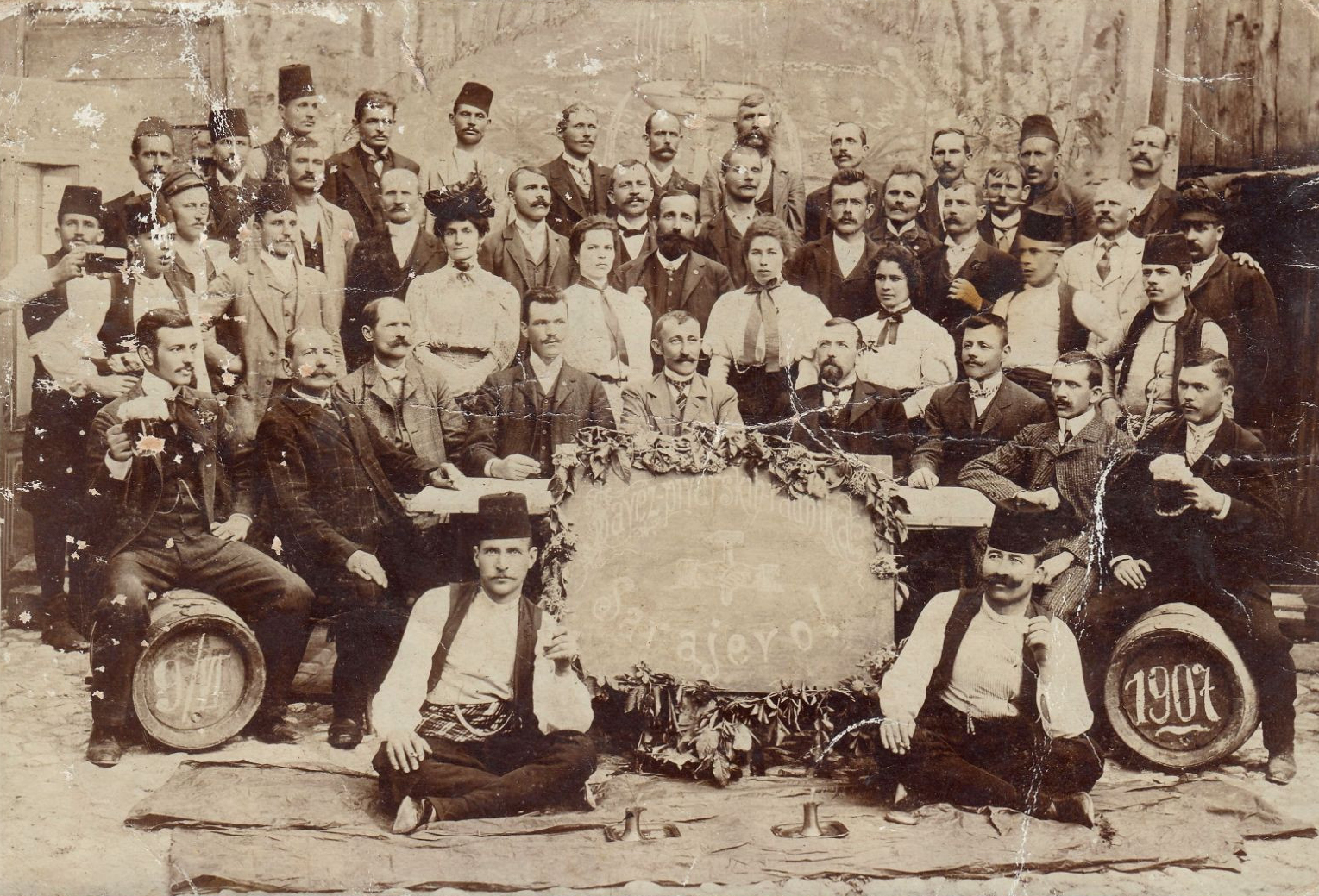
Savez Pivarskih Radnika (Brewery Workers' Union), Sarajevo, 9 June 1907

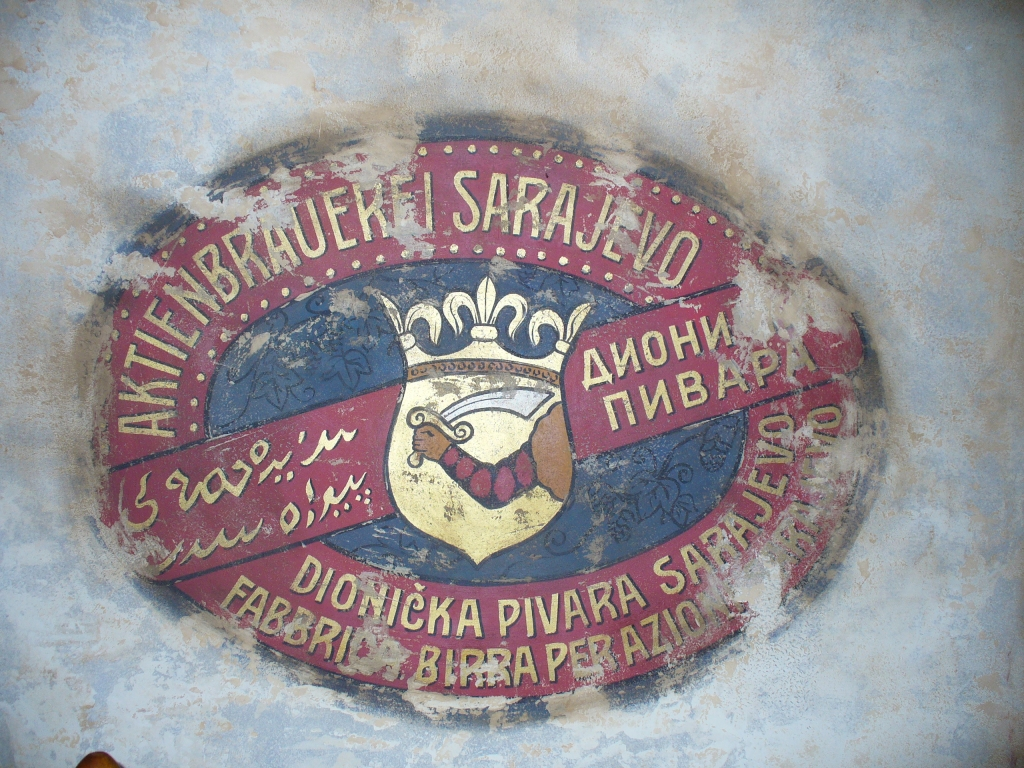
Old logo

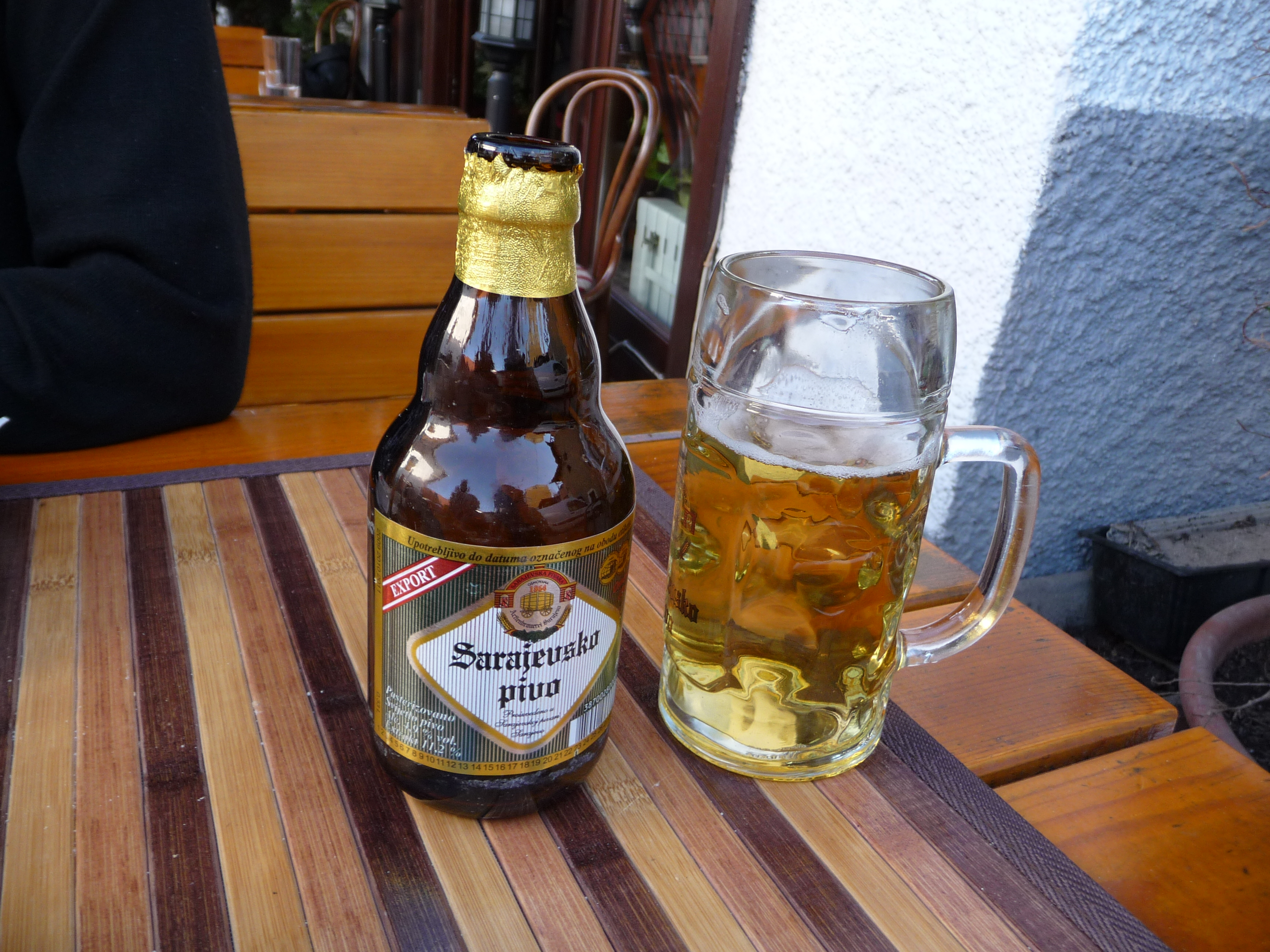
Sarajevsko
