= Manosque =

Manosque Manòsca (Provençal)
- Commune
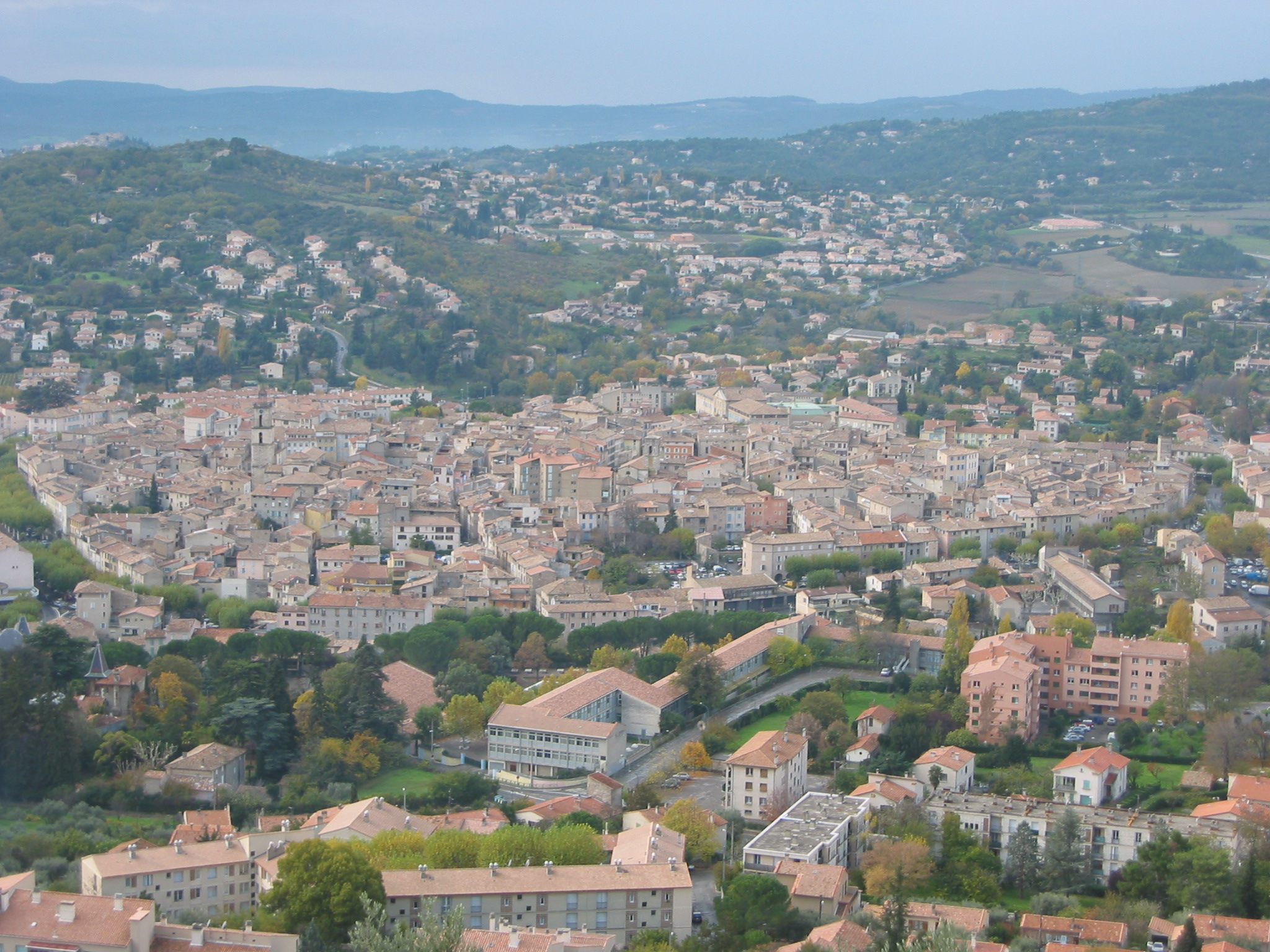
- Manosque seen from the Mont d'Or

- Coat of arms
- Location of Manosque
- Location within France Location within Provence-Alpes-Côte d'Azur
- Coordinates: 43°50′03″N 5°47′02″E
- Country: France
- Region: Provence-Alpes-Côte d'Azur
- Department: Alpes-de-Haute-Provence
- Arrondissement: Forcalquier
- Canton: Manosque-1, 2 and 3
- Intercommunality: Durance-Luberon-Verdon Agglomération

Government
  - Mayor (2026–32): Camille Galtier
- Area^{1}: 56.73 km^{2} (21.90 sq mi)
- Elevation: 330 m (1,080 ft)
- Highest elevation: 730 m (2,400 ft)
- Lowest elevation: 279 m (915 ft)
- Population (2023): 22,718
  - Density: 400.5/km^{2} (1,037/sq mi)
- Time zone: UTC+01:00 (CET)
  - Summer (DST): UTC+02:00 (CEST)
- INSEE/Postal code: 04112 /04100
- ^{1} French Land Register data, which excludes lakes, ponds, glaciers > 1 km^{2} (0.386 sq mi or 247 acres) and river estuaries.

Manosque (French pronunciation: [manɔsk]; Provençal Occitan: Manòsca in classical norm or Manosco in Mistralian norm) is the largest town and commune in the Alpes-de-Haute-Provence department in southeastern France. However, it is not the préfecture (capital) of the department, which is the smaller town of Digne-les-Bains. Manosque is located at the far eastern end of the Luberon near the Durance river.

== History ==
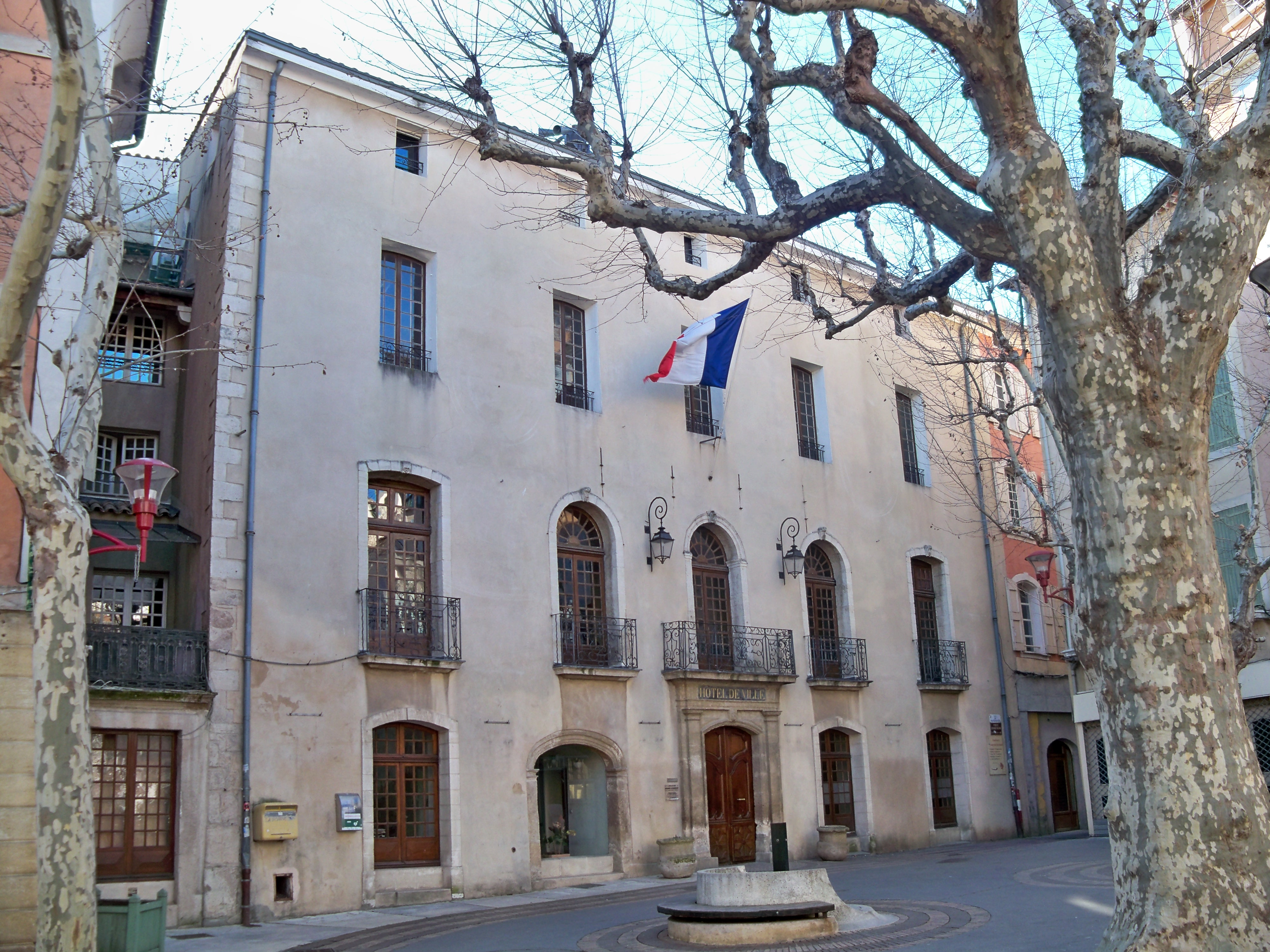
The Hôtel de Ville

It was in the 13th century that the city walls were constructed: they have been completely destroyed apart from a few remaining gates.

The Hôtel de Ville dates back at least to about 1750.

== Population ==
Historical population

Year	Pop.	±% p.a.
1793	4,726	—
1800	5,360	+1.81%
1806	5,570	+0.64%
1821	5,544	−0.03%
1831	5,543	−0.00%
1836	4,995	−2.06%
1841	5,311	+1.23%
1846	5,684	+1.37%
1851	5,073	−2.25%
1856	5,897	+3.06%
1861	5,936	+0.13%
1866	5,919	−0.06%
1872	6,124	+0.57%
1876	6,136	+0.05%
1881	5,775	−1.21%
1886	5,450	−1.15%
1891	5,572	+0.44%
1896	5,265	−1.13%
1901	5,098	−0.64%

Year	Pop.	±% p.a.
1906	5,017	−0.32%
1911	4,853	−0.66%
1921	5,036	+0.37%
1926	4,989	−0.19%
1931	5,661	+2.56%
1936	5,635	−0.09%
1946	6,734	+1.80%
1954	7,750	+1.77%
1962	10,080	+3.34%
1968	16,281	+8.32%
1975	19,150	+2.35%
1982	18,760	−0.29%
1990	19,107	+0.23%
1999	19,603	+0.29%
2007	21,777	+1.32%
2012	22,099	+0.29%
2017	22,333	+0.21%
2023	22,718	+0.29%

Source: EHESS and INSEE (1968-2023)

== Personalities ==
- Economy
  - Olivier Baussan, founder of L’Occitane and Oliviers & Co.
- Science
  - Félix Esclangon (1905-1956), physicist, born and buried in Manosque.
- Medicine
  - Fava of Manosque was a Jewish physician and surgeon in the early 14th century (c. 1321).
  - Pierre Gérard Vassal (1769-1840) doctor and surgeon born in Manosque.
- Writers
  - Marc-Antoine Laugier (1711-1769) born in Manosque, Jesuit writer and music critic considered the father of naturalism.
  - Élémir Bourges (1852-1925) born in Manosque, novelist and journalist.
  - Jean Giono (1895-1970) born and died in Manosque, buried in the communal cemetery.
  - Pierre Magnan (1922-2012) born in Manosque, passionate writer of Provence.
  - René Frégni born in Marseille, lived in Manosque.
  - Sonia Chiambretto writer, lived in Manosque, worked with others on the archives of the Papon case.
- Politicians
  - François Joseph de Pochet (1729-1794), born in Manosque, deputy to the Estates General of 1789, representing the sénéchaussée of Aix-en-Provence.
  - Henri Maurel (1867-1935), born in Manosque, deputy for Bouches-du-Rhône in 1919.
  - Pierre Augier (1910-1963), deputy for Vaucluse, and mayor of Pertuis, born in Manosque.
- Actors
  - Christian Barbier (1924-2009) spent the last years of his life in Manosque and died there.
  - Hafsia Herzi born in Manosque in 1987.
  - Grégory Basso born in Manosque in 1974, French actor and singer, participant in TV reality shows.
- Artists
  - The English painter Ralph Rumney spent the last years of his life in Manosque.
- Musicians
  - The composer Adolphe Blanc was born in Manosque on the 24 June 1828.
  - The jazz musician Olivier Gatto born in Manosque en 1963.
  - The French rock guitarist, singer, and movie soundtrack artist - Stéphane Honde (aka Steph Honde) : "Rock You Like a Hurricane" in collaboration with Micki Milosevic under the band name "Unprotected Innocence", Sony Music Entertainment in the movie HellBoy, released by Lionsgate, April 2019.
  - The French rock group Café Bertrand.
  - The bass-baritone Vincent le Texier.
- Sports
  - The athlete Salvatore Alario, junior French high jump champion in the 1970s.
  - The motocross driver Jean-Michel Bayle born in Manosque in 1969.
  - The swimmer Esther Baron was a member of the EP Manosque club.
  - The amateur French cycling champion 1971 Richard Podesta.
  - The international athlete Gloria Garrido was born in Manosque in 1951
  - The professional racing cyclist Julien El Farès, born in Manosque in 1985.
  - The racing cyclist Édouard Fachleitner (1921-2008), nicknamed "le berger de Manosque" (the shepherd of Manosque), second in the Tour de France 1947.
  - The middle-distance runner (800 metres) Florent Lacasse.
  - The flyweight boxer Karim Guerfi, junior world champion, champion of France, champion of Europe (2013).

== Twin towns ==
Manosque is twinned with:

- Leinfelden-Echterdingen, Germany
- Voghera, Italy

== See also ==
- Coteaux de Pierrevert AOC
- Communes of the Alpes-de-Haute-Provence department
