= Groupe L'Occitane =

Global beauty company

Groupe L’Occitane
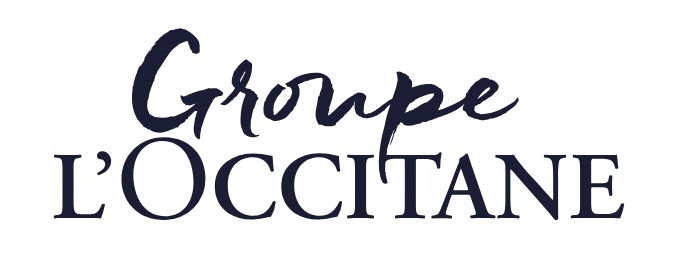
- Type: Private
- Industry: Cosmetics, skincare, wellness
- Founded: 2000
- Founder: Reinold Geiger
- Headquarters: Luxembourg City, Luxembourg
- Area served: Worldwide
- Key people: Reinold Geiger (chairman and CEO); André J. Hoffmann (Board Member); Karl Guénard (Board Member)
- Brands: L'Occitane en Provence (flagship); Melvita; Erborian; L'Occitane au Brésil; Elemis; Sol de Janeiro; Dr. Vranjes Firenze
- Revenue: €2.135 billion (FY2023)
- Owner: Reinold Geiger (controlling shareholder)
- Number of employees: 8,835 (as of 31 March 2023)
- Website: group.loccitane.com

Groupe L’Occitane is a multinational holding company specializing in cosmetics, skincare, and wellness products. Founded in Luxembourg in 2000, the group manages a portfolio of beauty and personal care brands operating in over 90 countries. Its most prominent brand is L’Occitane en Provence, a French skincare and fragrance company established in 1976.

The company has received international coverage in financial and industry media, including Reuters, the Financial Times, Forbes, and WWD, for its public listing, acquisitions, and brand expansion strategy.

== History ==
Groupe L’Occitane was incorporated in 2000 in Luxembourg to serve as the holding company for L'Occitane en Provence, which had been founded in 1976 by Olivier Baussan. The group’s formation was led by Austrian businessman Reinold Geiger, who acquired a controlling stake in the brand in the 1990s.

In 2010, Groupe L’Occitane became the first French company to list on the Hong Kong Stock Exchange, raising approximately US$787 million in its IPO. Shares began trading on 7 May 2010, raising funds primarily to finance store openings. China Investment Corporation invested US$50 million as a cornerstone investor. By 2010, L’Occitane operated more than 1,500 retail locations in over 80 countries, including 753 branded stores. In the year ended March 2009, it generated sales of €537.3 million.

In 2013, the company employed about 6,600 people worldwide and launched a new brand, L’Occitane au Brésil, focused on products from Brazil.

In 2019, it acquired UK-based skincare company Elemis for US$900 million, marking a significant entry into the U.S. premium skincare market.

In 2021, the group acquired a majority stake in U.S.-based brand Sol de Janeiro for $450 million.

In 2022, L’Occitane acquired Australian clean beauty brand Grown Alchemist. In April 2024, the Group sold its stake in Grown Alchemist to former CEO André Hoffmann, with CEO Anna Teal retaining a minority interest.

In April 2024, controlling shareholder Reinold Geiger offered to take the company private at HK$34 per share, above the then-market price of HK$29.5. The €6.5 billion deal, backed by debt financing from Credit Agricole Corporate and Investment Bank, Blackstone, and Goldman Sachs, resulted in L’Occitane’s delisting from the Hong Kong exchange.

In July 2024, it acquired a majority stake in Italian fragrance brand Dr. Vranjes Firenze.

== Corporate structure ==
Groupe L’Occitane is registered as L’Occitane International S.A. in Luxembourg. It operates from its global headquarters in Luxembourg, with regional offices in Geneva, Paris, Hong Kong, Tokyo, New York, and São Paulo.

It was listed on the Hong Kong Stock Exchange under the ticker SEHK: 973 from 2010 to 2024. In April 2024, Geiger initiated a buyout to take the company private.

== Global presence ==
As of fiscal year 2025, the L’Occitane Group operates in more than 90 countries worldwide. The company manages a total of 3,052 retail outlets, including 1,348 company-owned stores and 1,704 points of sale through third parties.

The Group reports that its largest markets include the Americas, Asia-Pacific, and Europe, Middle East and Africa (EMEA), with the Americas contributing the highest share of sales in recent years.

== Brands and subsidiaries ==
The L’Occitane Group manages a portfolio of beauty and personal care brands with diverse geographic origins.

- L’Occitane en Provence – The flagship brand, founded in 1976 in Manosque, France. Its products are inspired by ingredients and traditions from Provence and are sold globally through both owned stores and third-party outlets.
- Melvita – An organic skincare brand established in 1983 in Ardèche, France, and acquired by the Group in 2008. Melvita was one of the first French beauty brands to be certified organic and distributes through pharmacies, organic retailers, and e-commerce.
- Erborian – A French–Korean hybrid skincare brand, acquired in 2012. The brand is best known for introducing “BB Cream” to the European market and combines Korean skincare technology with French cosmetic traditions.
- L’Occitane au Brésil – A brand launched by the Group in 2013, inspired by Brazilian biodiversity and culture. It sources ingredients from local producers in Brazil and markets collections tied to native plants and regional traditions.Their products are sold exclusively in Brazil.
- LimeLife by Alcone – A U.S.-based direct-selling cosmetics brand in which the Group acquired a majority stake in 2018. LimeLife markets professional-grade cosmetics and skincare through a network of independent beauty guides, primarily in North America.
- Elemis – A British premium skincare brand, acquired in 2019 for US$900 million. Elemis is recognized for its Pro-Collagen line and is distributed through spas, cruise lines, and retail partners in the UK and U.S.
- Sol de Janeiro – A beauty brand founded in the US in 2015 inspired by Brazilian beach culture. L’Occitane acquired an 83% stake in 2021. The brand gained popularity with its “Brazilian Bum Bum Cream” and has ranked among top sellers at Sephora.
- Grown Alchemist – An Australian skincare brand in which the Group acquired a majority stake in 2022. In April 2024, the Group sold its stake to André Hoffmann, former CEO and board member, with CEO Anna Teal retaining a minority interest.

The Group previously owned Le Couvent des Minimes, a French botanical skincare line created in 2004 and sold in 2017.

== Sustainability and ESG strategy ==
Groupe L’Occitane has committed to net-zero carbon emissions by 2050 and a 55% reduction by 2031, in line with the Science Based Targets initiative (SBTi). It has also introduced in-store refill stations, eco-refill packaging, and biodiversity programs with traceable ingredient sourcing.

== Criticism and controversies ==
In March 2022, L’Occitane faced backlash for continuing operations in Russia during the Ukraine invasion, citing franchise obligations and employee safety. Following public pressure, the company announced it would shut down its Russian stores and e-commerce operations in April 2022.
