= Melvita =

International retailer of body, face, and home products

- Industry: skincare and cosmetics
- Founded: 1983
- Founder: Bernard Chevilliat
- Headquarters: Lagorce, France
- Owner: Groupe L'Occitane
- Website: Official website

Melvita is an international retailer of body, face, and home products based in Lagorce, France. The company was founded in 1983 by biologist and beekeeper, Bernard Chevilliat on a farm in the Ardèche, France.

The company developed soaps, natural skin and body care and toiletries ahead of the trend for natural and organic products during the 1980s and 1990s, and was one of the first brands to be granted the ECOCERT label for certified organic health and beauty products in France in 2002. It is France's largest certified organic beauty brand and now has a range of over 400 products.

Melvita was bought by French cosmetics brand L'Occitane in 2008 and as part of their expansion programme launched in the UK in 2010, with the first flagship store located in Covent Garden in London. The company also has stores in Hong Kong, Germany and Russia. Its US site closed in September 2013.
