= Frégni =

Frégni or Fregni is a surname. Notable people with the surname include:

- Mirella Fregni, later known as Mirella Freni, (1935–2020), Italian opera soprano
- René Frégni (born 1947), French novelist
