= GP Explorer =

Formula 4 car competition

- Venue: Circuit Bugatti
- Location: Le Mans, France; 47°57′00″N 00°12′27″E
- Corporate sponsor: Air Up
- First race: 8 October 2022
- Last race: 5 October 2025
- Laps: 15 laps

GP Explorer was an annual Formula 4 car competition organized by French content creator Lucas "Squeezie" Hauchard with support from FFSA Academy, bringing together internet personalities across the globe to race against each other. Primarily featuring French content creators, it later grew to include other personalities worldwide. The competition used chassis from Mygale prepped by Alpine and Oreca with de-tuned Renault engines.

All three editions of GP Explorer were held at the Circuit Bugatti at Le Mans, France, the first of which was held on 8 October 2022. Broadcast live on Twitch, it was the highest-viewed French stream on the platform at the time, reaching a peak of over one million viewers and an average of 400,000 viewers.

== Event history ==
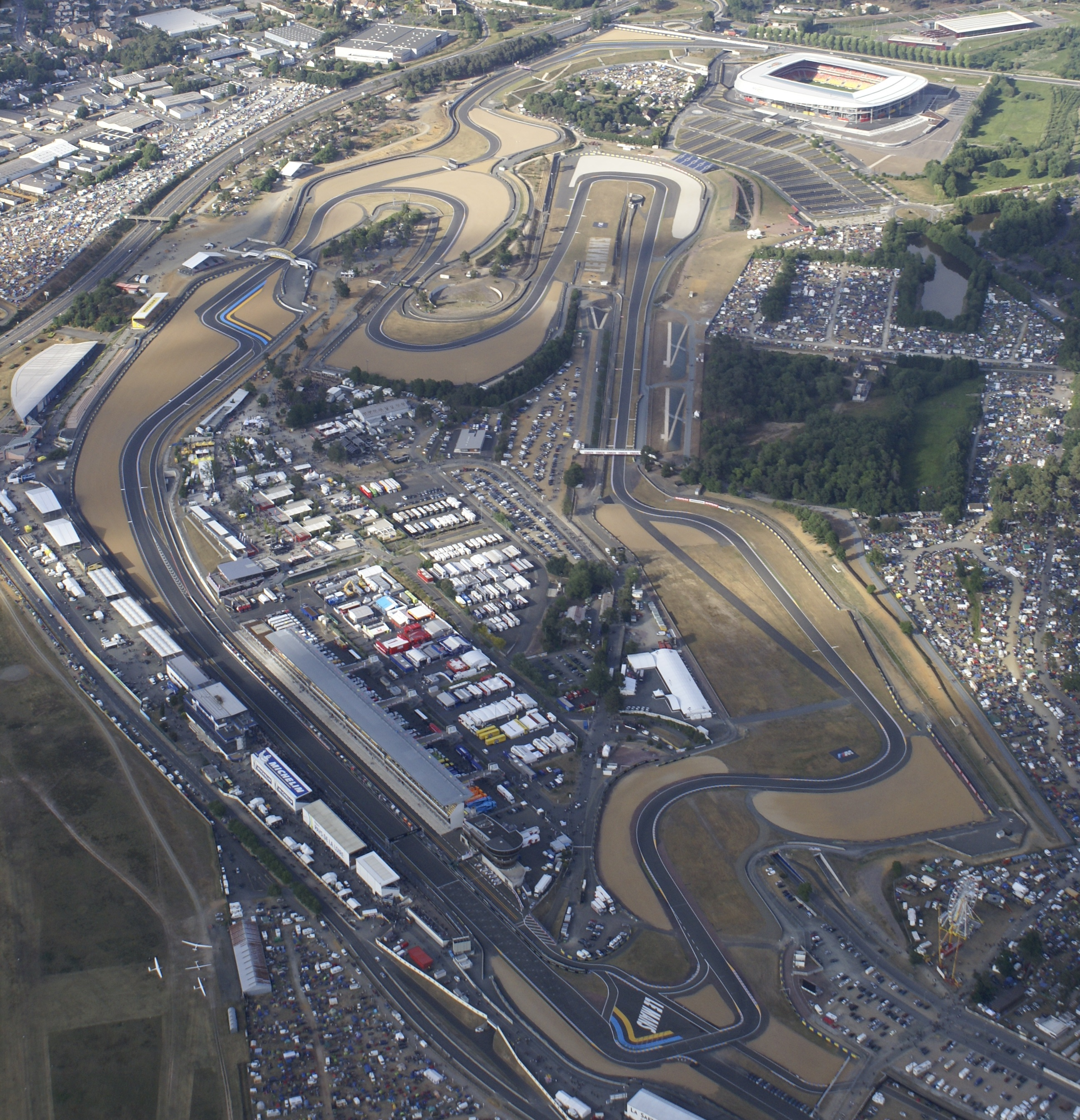
Circuit Bugatti played host to GP Explorer in all three years of competition.

During the ZEvent charity in 2020, Squeezie pledged to host a real-life Formula Renault tournament if the charity's live stream met a donation goal of €100,000. Two years later on 5 April 2022 during one of his Twitch live streams, Squeezie revealed GP Explorer, a race for French content creators competing in Formula 4 machinery around Circuit Bugatti at Le Mans, France. The inaugural race began on 8 October 2022, bringing together 22 French content creators, divided into eleven teams. Participants trained for several months, with some obtaining racing licenses.

The second race in 2023 featured French music artists alongside content creators, including SCH, Soso Maness and Kekra. The third race in 2025 was the last and most diverse GP Explorer event, dubbed "The Last Race", which featured an added sprint race, a revised points system, live broadcasting of team radio, international streams, and creator drivers from outside of France, including the United States, Spain, Canada, and Switzerland.

== Results by year ==
=== 2022 ===
Sylvain Levy of Vilebrequin won the race from second on the grid, ahead of Pierre-Olivier "Depielo" Valette and Étienne "Étienne Moustache" Jouneau. The trophies were handed out by Jamel Debbouze, Bigflo & Oli, and Matthieu Vaxivière.

During qualifying, Jordan "Joyca" Rondelli suffered a major accident at the exit of the Dunlop curve. His team's mechanics managed to repair the car and the videographer was able to start the race. Joyca described his hit, saying, "I got there, in the big Dunlop of death, there's a wall that's a little scary, well, I took it." The event, broadcast live on Twitch, gathered just over one million concurrent viewers, becoming the most viewed French stream and one of the top 10 most viewed streams on the platform. 40,000 spectators were present at the race.

| Pos. | No. | Personality | Team | Laps | Time/Retired | Grid |
|---|---|---|---|---|---|---|
| 1 | 16 | (France) Sylvain Levy | NordVPN Vilebrequin | 15 | 27:32.000 | 2 |
| 2 | 64 | (France) Depielo | Oscaro | 15 | +0.248 | 1 |
| 3 | 99 | (France) Étienne Moustache | World of Tanks | 15 | +5.100 | 3 |
| 4 | 94 | (France) LeBouseuh | PUBG Mobile | 15 | +23.079 | 8 |
| 5 | 14 | (France) Squeezie | MWII Racing Team | 15 | +26.329 | 6 |
| 6 | 30 | (France) Valouzz | Oscaro | 15 | +42.280 | 14 |
| 7 | 15 | (France) Djilsi | Alpine | 14 | +1 lap | 15 |
| 8 | 6 | (France) Manon Lanza | Alpine | 14 | +1 lap | 10 |
| 9 | 11 | (France) Bibi | Black Adam | 14 | +1 lap | 11 |
| 10 | 31 | (France) Dobby | Fruitz | 14 | +1 lap | 9 |
| 11 | 7 | (France) Gotaga | MWII Racing Team | 14 | +1 lap | 16 |
| 12 | 26 | (France) ThéoBabac | Rhinoshield | 14 | +1 lap | 17 |
| 13 | 27 | (France) Kaatsup | PUBG Mobile | 14 | +1 lap | 13 |
| 14 | 49 | (France) Amixem | World of Tanks | 14 | +1 lap | 20 |
| 15 | 3 | (France) Seb la Frite | Igraal | 14 | +1 lap | 18 |
| 16 | 12 | (France) Domingo | Cupra Team PAX | 14 | +1 lap | 21 |
| 17 | 24 | (France) Prime | Black Adam | 13 | +1 lap | 4 |
| 18 | 8 | (France) Sofyan | Igraal | 13 | +2 laps | 19 |
| 19 | 13 | (France) Deujna | Fruitz | 13 | +2 laps | 22 |
| 20 | 29 | (France) Joyca | Rhinoshield | 13 | +2 laps | 12 |
| Ret | 21 | (France) Xari | Cupra Team PAX | 12 | Collision | 7 |
| Ret | 10 | (France) Pierre Chabrier | NordVPN Vilebrequin | 12 | Collision | 5 |

=== 2023 ===
Pierre-Olivier "Depielo" Valette won the second edition of GP Explorer from pole position, ahead of Sylvain Levy and Étienne "Étienne Moustache" Jouneau. 60,000 spectators were present at the race, and the event's live stream garnered over one million concurrent viewers for the second year in a row.

French YouTuber Manon Lanza was subject to misogyny and sexual harassment by viewers online following a collision between herself and Maxime Biaggi on lap 2 of the race. These comments were quickly condemned by the organizers of GP Explorer and fellow content creator drivers in the event. Lanza was stretchered out of her car and taken to hospital for evaluation.

| Pos. | No. | Personality | Team | Laps | Time/Retired | Grid |
|---|---|---|---|---|---|---|
| 1 | 64 | (France) Depielo | Racers by Alpine | 15 | 38:41.998 | 1 |
| 2 | 1 | (France) Sylvain Levy | NordVPN Vilebrequin | 15 | +4.824 | 3 |
| 3 | 43 | (France) Étienne Moustache | Wargaming.net | 15 | +6.836 | 2 |
| 4 | 94 | (France) LeBouseuh | Overwatch 2 | 15 | +18.923 | 4 |
| 5 | 16 | (France) Ana On Air | Mouv' | 15 | +37.873 | 5 |
| 6 | 10 | (France) Pierre Chabrier | NordVPN Vilebrequin | 15 | +38.656 | 7 |
| 7 | 14 | (France) Squeezie | Gentle Mates | 15 | +40.180 | 9 |
| 8 | 49 | (France) Amixem | Wargaming.net | 15 | +41.363 | 8 |
| 9 | 13 | (France) Soso Maness | Samsung | 15 | +50.511 | 10 |
| 10 | 27 | (France) Kaatsup | Overwatch 2 | 15 | +54.309 | 12 |
| 11 | 7 | (France) Gotaga | Gentle Mates | 15 | +59.086 | 16 |
| 12 | 38 | (France) Mister V | Subway | 15 | +1:08.312 | 15 |
| 13 | 23 | (France) Theodort | Alpine | 15 | +1:20.373 | 14 |
| 14 | 15 | (France) Djilsi | Alpine | 15 | +1:26.425 | 17 |
| 15 | 3 | (France) Seb la Frite | Rhinoshield | 15 | +1:32.332 | 18 |
| 16 | 98 | (France) Theo Juice | Subway | 15 | +1:35.400 | 19 |
| 17 | 28 | (Switzerland) Baghera Jones | Cupra | 15 | +1:50.518 | 20 |
| 18 | 31 | (France) Maghla | Rhinoshield | 14 | +1 lap | 23 |
| 19 | 66 | (France) Horty | Cupra | 13 | +2 laps | 24 |
| Ret | 8 | (France) Billy | Crunchyroll | 14 | - | 21 |
| Ret | 92 | (France) Kekra | Crunchyroll | 10 | - | 22 |
| Ret | 19 | (France) SCH | Samsung | 8 | - | 13 |
| Ret | 97 | (France) Maxime Biaggi | Mouv' | 2 | Collision | 6 |
| Ret | 11 | (France) Manon Lanza | Racers by Alpine | 2 | Collision | 11 |

=== 2025 ===
The third GP Explorer event was the final year of competition. The 2025 edition garnered the largest audience in the competition's history, being broadcast to 1.4 million viewers on Twitch, 1.22 million viewers on live television via France 2, and drawing 200,000 live spectators across three days at Circuit Bugatti, peaking at 80,000 on Sunday.

International broadcasts were featured for the first time, including English language streams hosted by Pokimane and Hasan Piker who were both present at the event. The trophies were presented by Charles Milesi, Victor Martins, and Sébastien Loeb.

For the first time in the competition, a sprint format was used. Spanish streamer Karchez won both races. An additional exhibition race was also introduced, dubbed the 'Race of Legends', where the four personalities who finished in the top four places in the previous two editions, those being Depielo, Sylvain Lévy, Etienne Moustache and LeBouseuh, competed against each other in Ligier JS P4 sports cars in a 12-lap race. Etienne Moustache ultimately emerged victorious.

==== Sprint race ====
| Pos. | No. | Personality | Team | Laps | Time/Retired | Grid |
|---|---|---|---|---|---|---|
| 1 | 21 | (Spain) Karchez | Cupra | 8 | - | 1 |
| 2 | 97 | (France) Maxime Biaggi | Lego Racing Team | 8 | +4.681 | 5 |
| 3 | 14 | (France) Squeezie | Netflix | 8 | +5.558 | 3 |
| 4 | 77 | (France) Houdi | Durex | 8 | +8.467 | 8 |
| 5 | 2 | (Canada) Cocottee | Erborian | 8 | +10.249 | 9 |
| 6 | 15 | (France) Djilsi | Lego Racing Team | 8 | +11.703 | 14 |
| 7 | 7 | (France) Gotaga | Lofi Girl Gentle Mates | 8 | +14.324 | 19 |
| 8 | 23 | (France) Théodort | Andros Be Nuts! | 8 | +15.846 | 16 |
| 9 | 4 | (France) Nikof | Lofi Girl Gentle Mates | 8 | +19.869 | 18 |
| 10 | 17 | (Spain) Ander | Cupra | 8 | +20.630 | 22 |
| 11 | 48 | (France) Lea Élui | Sol de Janeiro | 8 | +25.288 | 17 |
| 12 | 3 | (France) Anyme | Durex | 8 | +28.384 | 23 |
| 13 | 28 | (Switzerland) Baghera Jones | Erborian | 8 | +35.777 | 24 |
| 14 | 42 | (United States) Ludwig Ahgren | The Crew Motorfest | 8 | +36.028 | 7 |
| 15 | 92 | (France) PLK | Subway | 8 | +36.218 | 6 |
| 16 | 16 | (France) Ana On Air | Alpine | 8 | +37.584 | 4 |
| 17 | 31 | (France) Maghla | Sol de Janeiro | 8 | +42.821 | 20 |
| 18 | 38 | (France) Mister V | Subway | 8 | +45.958 | 10 |
| 19 | 51 | (United States) Michael Reeves | The Crew Motorfest | 8 | +54.824 | 12 |
| 20 | 19 | (France) SCH | Samsung | 8 | +1:00.969 | 11 |
| 21 | 10 | (France) AmineMaTue | Netflix | 8 | +1:02.091 | 13 |
| 22 | 56 | (France) Maastu | Andros Be Nuts! | 7 | +1 lap | 21 |
| Ret | 27 | (France) Kaatsup | Alpine | 6 | Accident | 2 |
| Ret | 99 | (France) Billy | Samsung | 2 | Accident | 15 |

==== Feature race ====
| Pos. | No. | Personality | Team | Laps | Time/Retired | Grid |
|---|---|---|---|---|---|---|
| 1 | 21 | (Spain) Karchez | Cupra | 16 | - | 1 |
| 2 | 27 | (France) Kaatsup | Alpine | 16 | +10.642 | 4 |
| 3 | 97 | (France) Maxime Biaggi | Lego Racing Team | 16 | +11.329 | 10 |
| 4 | 92 | (France) PLK | Subway | 16 | +12.682 | 5 |
| 5 | 77 | (France) Houdi | Durex | 16 | +13.421 | 7 |
| 6 | 17 | (Spain) Ander | Cupra | 16 | +17.857 | 2 |
| 7 | 7 | (France) Gotaga | Lofi Girl Gentle Mates | 16 | +23.005 | 6 |
| 8 | 15 | (France) Djilsi | Lego Racing Team | 16 | +23.154 | 13 |
| 9 | 42 | (United States) Ludwig Ahgren | The Crew Motorfest | 16 | +51.674 | 8 |
| 10 | 16 | (France) Ana On Air | Alpine | 16 | +56.693 | 14 |
| 11 | 19 | (France) SCH | Samsung | 16 | +56.987 | 11 |
| 12 | 4 | (France) Nikof | Lofi Girl Gentle Mates | 16 | +1:04.789 | 15 |
| 13 | 38 | (France) Mister V | Subway | 16 | +1:23.338 | 16 |
| 14 | 51 | (United States) Michael Reeves | The Crew Motorfest | 16 | +1:23.570 | 12 |
| 15 | 2 | (Canada) Cocottee | Erborian | 16 | +1:24.038 | 20 |
| 16 | 56 | (France) Maastu | Andros Be Nuts! | 16 | +1:35.592 | 18 |
| 17 | 10 | (France) AmineMaTue | Netflix | 16 | +1:36.922 | 22 |
| 18 | 3 | (France) Anyme | Durex | 16 | +3:49.398 | 19 |
| 19 | 28 | (Switzerland) Baghera Jones | Erborian | 16 | +4:09.596 | 17 |
| 20 | 48 | (France) Lea Élui | Sol de Janeiro | 16 | +6:29.667 | 24 |
| 21 | 99 | (France) Billy | Samsung | 16 | +8:33.304 | 23 |
| 22 | 31 | (France) Maghla | Sol de Janeiro | 16 | +9:25.691 | 21 |
| 23 | 14 | (France) Squeezie | Netflix | 15 | Accident | 9 |
| Ret | 23 | (France) Théodort | Andros Be Nuts! | 2 | Accident | 3 |

==== 'Race of Legends' ====
| Pos. | No. | Personality | Team | Laps | Time/Retired | Grid |
|---|---|---|---|---|---|---|
| 1 | 43 | (France) Étienne Moustache | Wilkinson Sword | 16 | - | 2 |
| 2 | 94 | (France) LeBouseuh | Wilkinson Sword | 16 | +8.415 | 4 |
| 3 | 64 | (France) Depielo | Wilkinson Sword | 16 | +35.076 | 1 |
| 4 | 16 | (France) Sylvain Levy | Wilkinson Sword | 16 | Disqualified | 3 |
