= Adolphe Blanc =

French composer

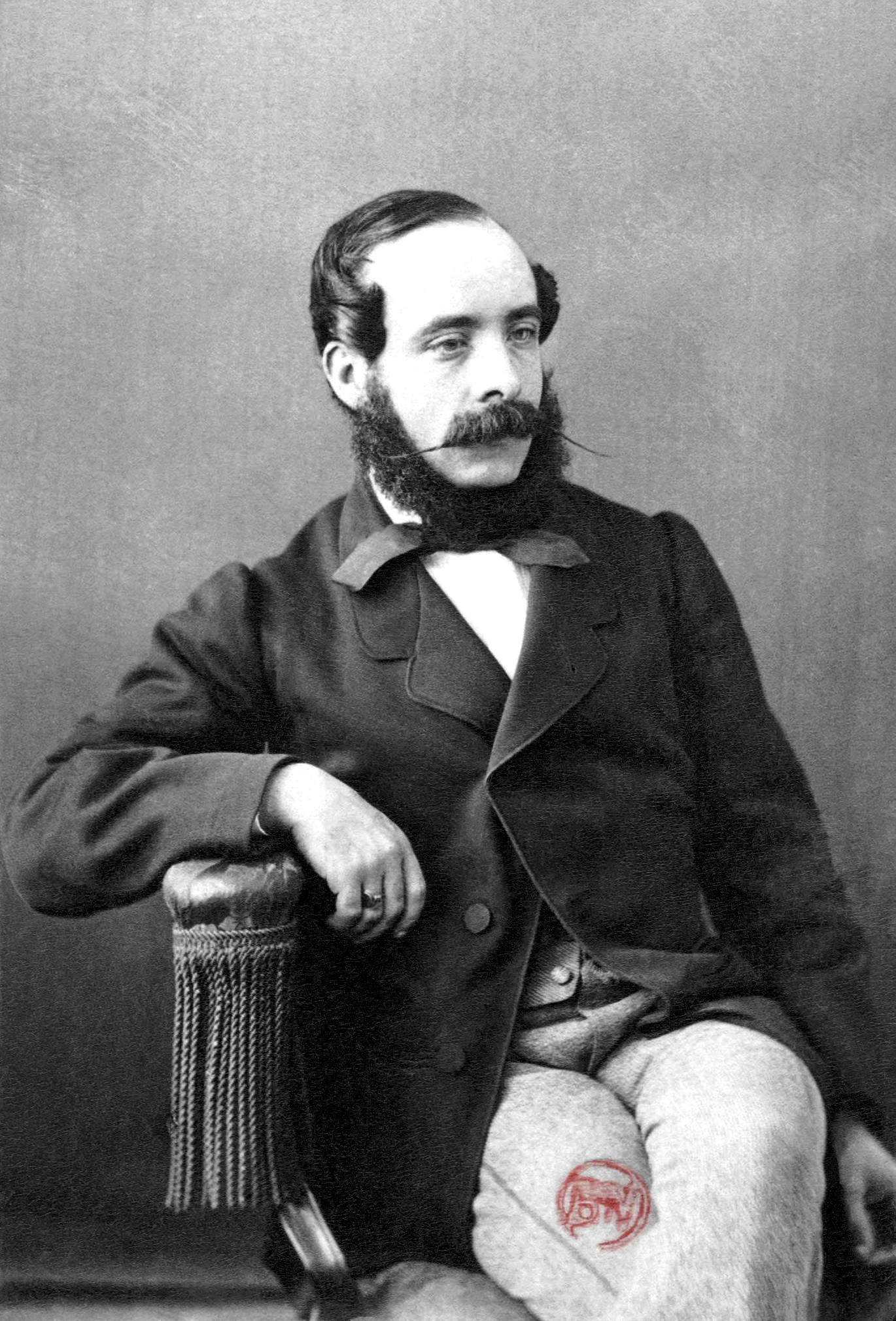

Adolphe Blanc (24 June 1828 – May 1885) was a French composer of chamber music.

Blanc was born in Manosque, Alpes-de-Haute-Provence. At the age of 13 he was sent to study violin at the Paris Conservatoire. Though he studied under Fromental Halévy, and though his one-act comic opera Les Deux Billets was performed in 1868, Blanc's refined music lies in the Romantic Viennese tradition of hausmusik for private performance, music that was essentially peripheral to the public musical life of contemporary Paris, which was centered on opera, and as a result Blanc has been largely overlooked. There are three string trios, four string quartets, seven string quintets of various configurations, 15 piano trios, piano quartets and quintets as well as settings and arrangements, songs, pieces for piano and violin, choral works and some orchestral works.

Adolphe Blanc was awarded the Prix Chartier in 1862.

He was conductor at the Théâtre Lyrique in Paris, 1855 – 1860, and died in Paris.

None of his music, save perhaps the Septet opus 40, can be called familiar. The following have been recorded:

- Trio for piano, clarinet and cello op. 23
- Quintet for piano, flute, clarinet, horn and bassoon op. 37
- Septet for clarinet, horn, bassoon, violin, viola, cello and double bass, op. 40 (1860)
- Sonatine concertante for two pianos, op. 64
- String quintets numbers 3 (op. 21), 4 (op. 22) and 7 (op. 50)
