= Kekra =

French-Moroccan rapper

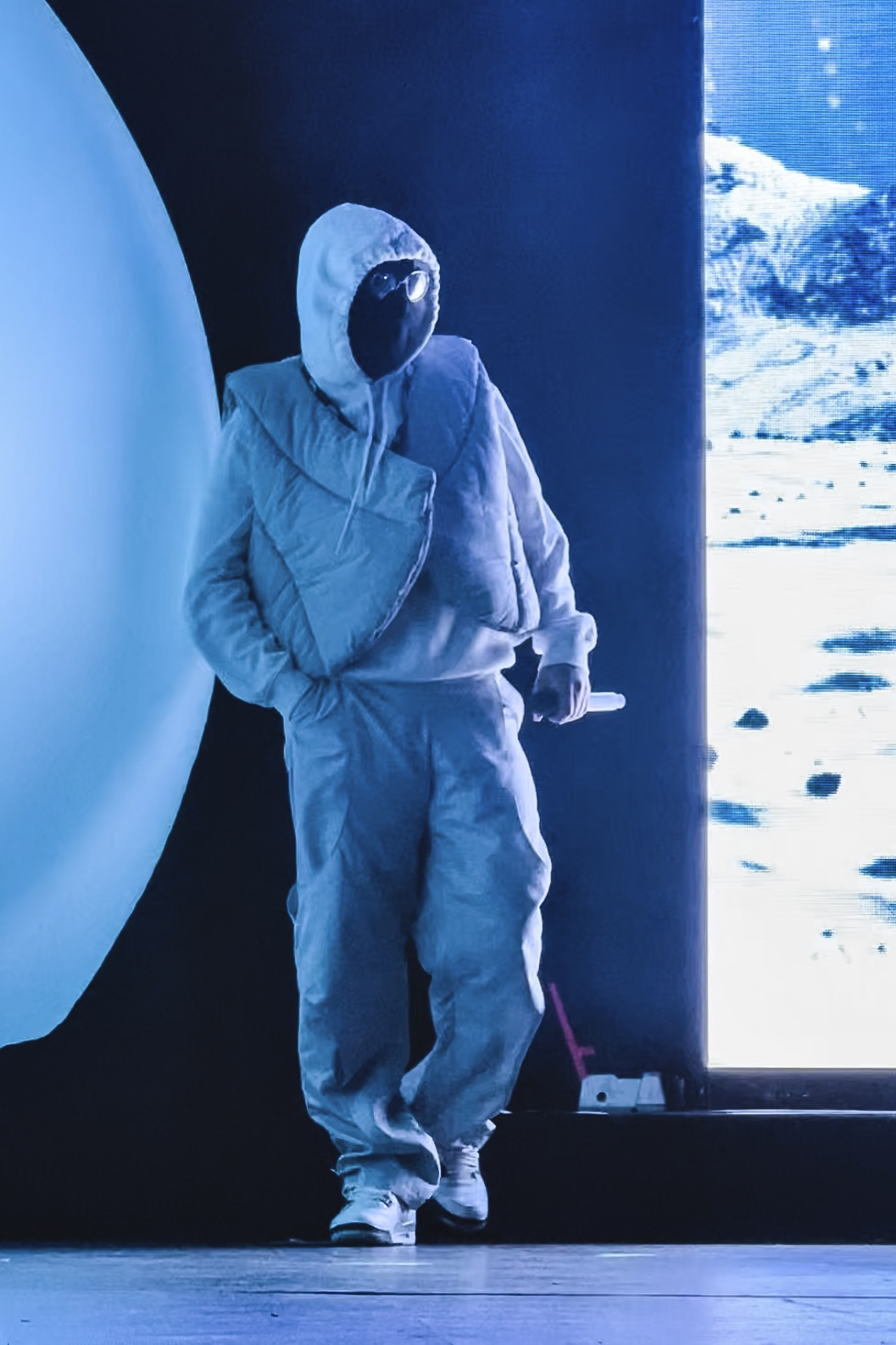

Background information
- Born: Unknown; Courbevoie
- Genres: Drill; Grime; Morap
- Occupations: Rapper, Singer

Kekra (backward-slang for "crack") is a French-Moroccan rapper and singer from Courbevoie, Hauts-de-Seine. He is recognized for his anonymity, concealing his face with a mask in music videos and public appearances, with very little known about his personal life.

Kekra is also known for his diverse musical style, which blends various subgenres of hip-hop and electronic music, including trap, grime, cloud rap, UK drill, and 2-step garage. He is fluent in English and Moroccan Arabic frequently incorporates elements of London's music scene into his work.

== Anonymity ==
Kekra's anonymity is a central part of his artistic persona. He has offered several reasons for wearing a mask in interviews. In one instance, he stated that the music is what matters, not the person behind it. In a different interview with Viceland, he claimed he wears the mask "so my mother doesn't find out I'm a rapper; she would be disappointed. She'd be ashamed, I think. Because I'm ashamed of what I'm currently doing. Because rap isn't a real job; rap is shit." These comments sparked some controversy within the French rap community.

During an appearance on the radio show La Sauce, he provided a third explanation, drawing a parallel to a trip he took to Asia where people wore masks to prevent the spread of illness. He suggested this symbolized his desire not to "mix with others," a stance he indicated would later change.

== Career ==
Kekra began his career in 2015, releasing two free online projects, Freebase, Vol. 01 and Freebase, Vol. 02. His first physical release, the mixtape Vréel, came in 2016 and helped him gain a wider audience. That same year, he followed up with the third volume in his Freebase series. He continued his momentum in 2017 with the release of Vréel 2 and Vréel 3, which further cemented his presence in the French music scene.

In 2018, Kekra released his debut studio album, Land, which reached number 32 on the French charts. He followed up with his second studio album, Vréalité, in June 2019. This album was notable for featuring one of the few collaborations of his career, on the title track "Vréalité" with fellow rapper Niska. The song became the album's biggest hit, peaking at number 38 on the charts.

He continued the Freebase series with the release of Freebase, Vol. 04 in March 2020. This project included his second career feature on the track "Kohhkra," a blend of his name and that of Japanese artist Kohh. In June 2020, he reissued the project with four additional tracks.

On April 2, 2021, Kekra released a self-titled album, Kekra, which contained 17 solo tracks. To promote the album, he performed a live-streamed concert from the top of the Grande Arche de la Défense the day before its release. A reissued version of the album, titled ꓘǝʞɹɐ, was released on June 30, 2021, featuring ten new songs.

On December 15, 2022, Kekra announced his seventh album, Stratos, which was released on January 23, 2023. The album was available for pre-order in four exclusive editions, each with a unique bonus track.

In July 2023, it was announced that Kekra would be participating as a driver in the GP Explorer 2, a Formula 4 race organized by French streamer Squeezie and live-streamed on Twitch. He teamed up with Billy (also known as RebeuDeter) for the event.

Kekra is known for shooting his music videos in various international locations, including Japan, Jamaica, Togo, Thailand, and the United Kingdom. His music has also been played on the London-based radio station NTS.

== Discography ==
Studio albums

- Vréel (2016)
- Vréel 2 (2017)
- Vréel 3 (2017)
- Land (2018)
- Vréalité (2019)
- Kekra (2021)
- Stratos (2023)
- Vréel 4 (2025)

Mixtapes

- Freebase, Vol. 01 (2015)
- Freebase, Vol. 02 (2016)
- Freebase, Vol. 03 (2016)
- Freebase, Vol. 04 (2020)

EPs

- HLM Bootleg (2020)

Reissues

- Vréel 2luxe (2017)
- Freebase, Vol. 04 (2020)
- ꓘǝʞɹɐ (2021)
