= Hôtel de Ville, Manosque =

Town hall in Manosque, France

Hôtel de Ville
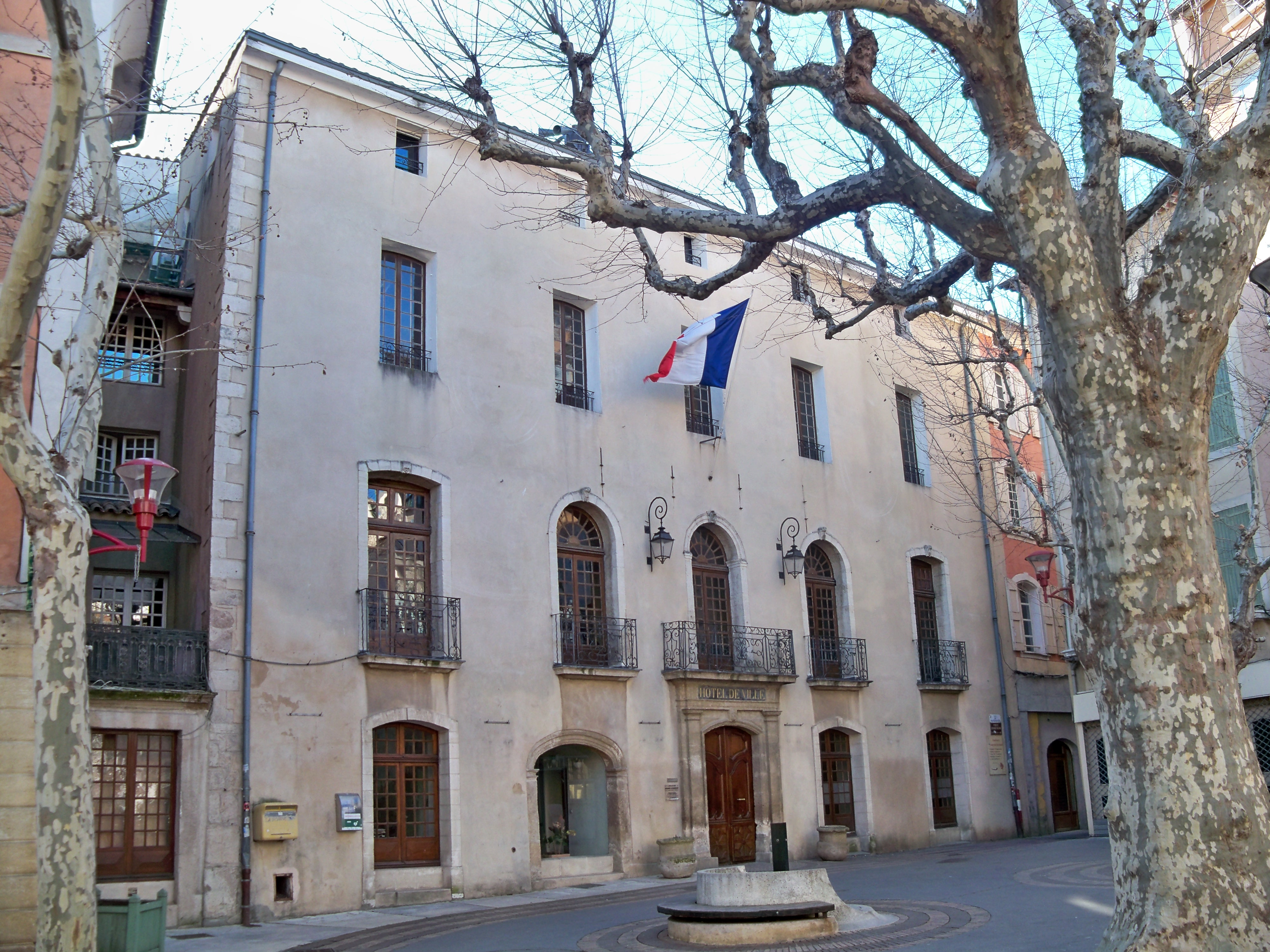
- The main frontage of the Hôtel de Ville in February 2011

General information
- Type: City hall
- Architectural style: Renaissance style
- Location: Manosque, France
- Coordinates: 43.8338°N 5.7823°E
- Completed: c.1750

Monument historique
- Official name: Hôtel de ville
- Type: Inscrit
- Designated: 1946
- Reference no.: PA00080425

The Hôtel de Ville (French pronunciation: [otɛl də vil], City Hall) is a municipal building in Manosque, Alpes-de-Haute-Provence, in southeastern France, standing on Place de l'Hôtel de Ville. It was designated a monument historique by the French government in 1946.

== History ==
The original meeting place of the consuls, established in 1397, was the since-demolished clergy house attached to the Church of Saint-Sauveur.

In 1770, the consuls decided to acquire a more substantial building for their meetings. The building they selected was the Hôtel de Pochet. This building was designed in the Renaissance style, built in brick with a cement render finish and dated back to at least 1750. It had been owned by the Bessière family in the mid-18th century. The head of the family was Jean-Joseph-François de Bessière: his daughter, Thérèse de Bessière, married a lawyer, Joseph-François Pochet, on 6 November 1753. Pochet went on to be an administrator of the Estates of Provence and a deputy for the city of Aix-en-Provence in the National Assembly in 1789.

The consuls held their first meeting in the building in 1772 and, after the French Revolution, it became the chosen meeting place of the new elected town council. Over the next two centuries the complex was expanded by acquiring adjacent buildings. The design involved a symmetrical main frontage of five bays facing onto the street. The central bay featured a segmental-headed doorway with a moulded surround and a keystone flanked by a pair of Doric order columns supporting an entablature. The other bays on the ground floor were fenestrated by segmental-headed windows with keystones; there were three round-headed windows flanked by a pair of segmental-headed windows on the first floor, a row of casement windows on the second floor and a series of small square windows at attic level. Internally, the principal room was the Salle du Conseil (council chamber).

Works of art in the town hall include part of a silver bust created in 1674 by the sculptor, Pierre Puget, depicting the Italian lay brother of the Benedictine Order, Gérard Tenque. Tenque went on to become the first Grand Master of the Knights Hospitaller. Only the head survives, the remainder of the bust having been melted down in 1793 during the French Revolution. Another work of art is the mosaic of the Villa Pèbre, which was discovered by Balthazar, Marquis de Brossard during excavations near Vinon-sur-Verdon in 1859. Composed of three scenes, the mosaic is now displayed in the council chamber.
