= Squeezie =

French YouTuber and gamer (born 1996)

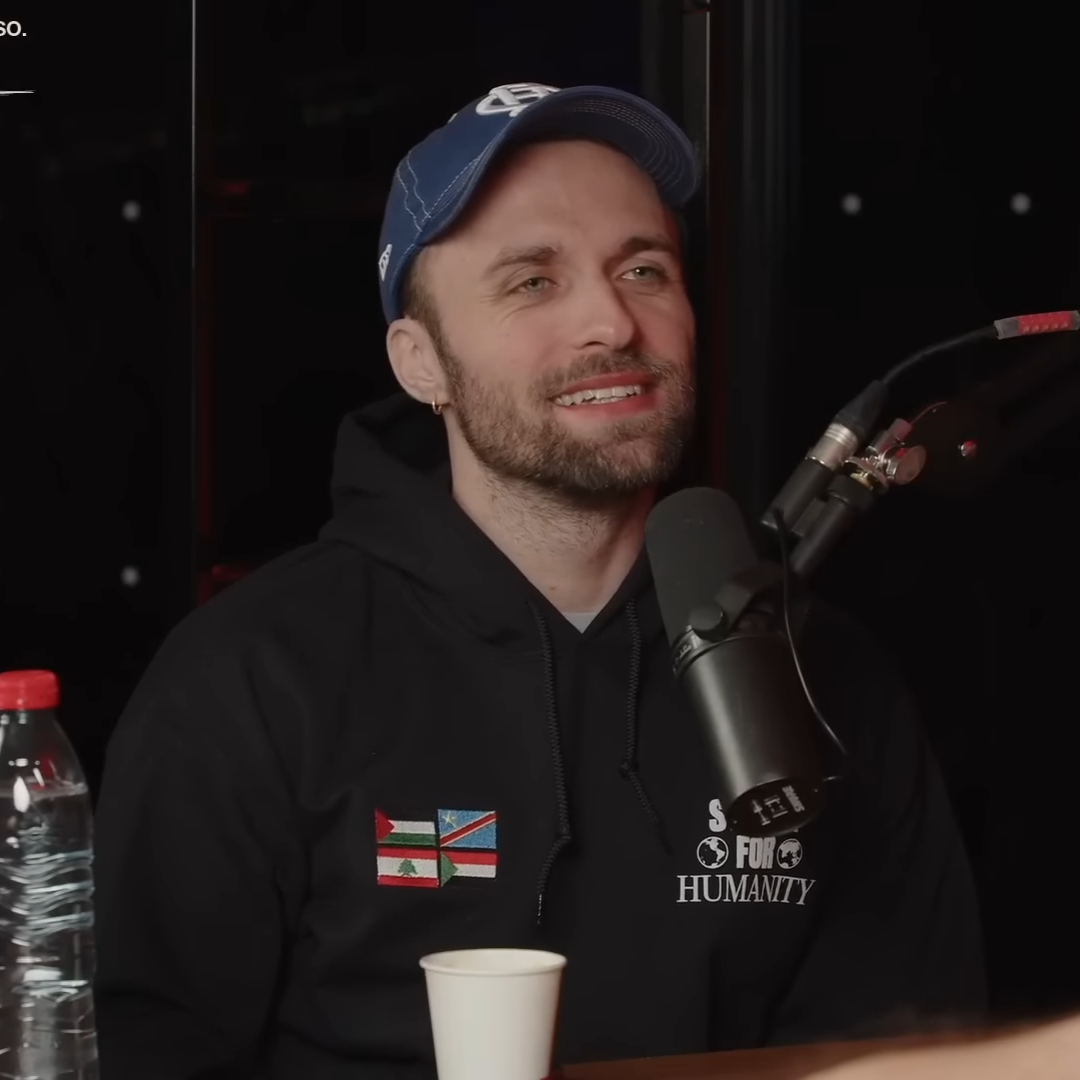
- Squeezie in 2025
- Born: Lucas Adrien Hauchard; 27 January 1996 (age 30); Vitry-sur-Seine, France
- Occupation: YouTuber

YouTube information
- Channel: Squeezie
- Years active: 2011–present
- Genres: Let's Play; comedy
- Subscribers: 20.2 millions
- Views: 12.1 billion
- Last updated: 11 March 2026

Lucas Adrien Hauchard (French pronunciation: [lyka oʃaʁ]; born 27 January 1996), known professionally as Squeezie, is a French YouTuber. He is the second most subscribed French-speaking YouTuber, after Tibo InShape, with over 20.2 million subscribers and 12 billion views. He became famous for his Let's Play commentaries and vlogs. He now makes videos where he plays real life games with other YouTubers or personalities and videos where he tells real stories (most of the time horrific ones). He has a music career and occasionally makes music videos. He also collaborated with Cyprien Iov on Bigorneaux & Coquillages, which stopped activity in 2019, the channel has over 5.9 million subscribers as of July 2025.

In September 2018, he launched a gaming channel titled Squeezie Gaming on which are exposed edited videos of his lives on Twitch. In 2022 he organized the GP Explorer, a Formula 4 competition; the second edition took place in 2023, and the third in October 2025.

== Early life and career ==
=== Beginnings on YouTube ===
Lucas Hauchard launched on YouTube in May 2008 with a first channel specialized in the game Dofus, Dofus Bouclier. This channel, inactive since June 2008, has two videos. In November 2010, he created another channel, TheVideobc, inactive since 18 November 2010, which has three videos; it also has a video game thematics.

He created his current YouTube channel under the pseudonym Squeezie in 2011, at the age of 15. Focused on video games testing, his channel achieved a fairly high profile, making him the youngest French person to gain over one million subscribers on YouTube, at the age of 17. He reached about 300,000 views per video during this period, during which he obtained his baccalauréat.

=== Growing popularity ===
In April 2013, when he had half a million subscribers, he teamed up with Cyprien, another French YouTuber, to create the channel CyprienGaming (currently Bigorneaux & Coquillage).

In 2014, he was frequently accused of plagiarising PewDiePie, an accusation he refuted through a video. In March 2014, according to SocialBlade, Lucas Hauchard became the most popular French YouTuber, ahead of The Sound you Need, Cyprien, Rémi Gaillard and Norman. At the end of 2014, the same website reported that Squeezie's videos were viewed 70.7 million times, more than Rémi Gaillard, Norman and Cauet combined.

He appears in the YouTube Rewind 2015, a video created by YouTube bringing together YouTubers and Internet personalities who marked the year.

In 2017, he participated in Fort Boyard, with Cyprien. Squeezie peaked at more than 1,860,000 subscribers in 2017, adding more than a billion to its viewing meter. He surpassed Norman in number of subscribers in June 2018 and then Cyprien a year later, becoming the first French-language videographer in number of subscribers.

In January 2024, a documentary series of five episodes aired on Prime Video, directed by his accomplice Théodore Bonnet, Merci Internet tells the life of Squeezie from his childhood to his popularity on the internet.

=== On Twitch ===
Squeezie started regular live broadcasts on Twitch in 2018. He has 6 million followers and he participated in the French-speaking live with the most viewers with a peak of 395,000 viewers with some of the biggest French streamers such as Gotaga and Locklear.

==== GP Explorer ====
During the fourth ZEvent, Squeezie had as a €100,000 donation goal "IRL Formula Renault tournament". On April 5, 2022, he gives the details of his new project, GP Explorer, during a Twitch stream.

The first edition took place on October 8th 2022 on the Bugatti Circuit in Le Mans. 22 French streamers and YouTubers participated in eleven teams. This event became very popular with 40,000 spectators at the racetrack and more than 1,000,000 viewers at once on Twitch, as well as 12.5 million cumulated viewers.

The second edition took place on September 9th 2023 on the same track. 24 streamers, YouTubers and rappers (SCH, Soso Maness and Kekra) participated in 12 teams.

The third and last edition took place on October 3 to October 5, 2025.

=== Music ===
Squeezie has created a lot of music over the years. He started selling his first album, named Oxyz, on 25 September 2020. He release his first song in 2017 in a YouTube video named “Placements de Produits” with Maxence.

In 2018, Squeezie released more songs such as, Freestyle de l'autodérision, top 1, Freestyle de potes feat. Maxenss and Seb, pas tout seul and 90 VS 2000 feat. Mcfly and Carlito.

In 2019, he released two songs, Le gaming c'est fini and Bye bye feat. Joyca. Squeezie and Joyca filmed a video where they collaboratively composed a summer hit in 3 days, Bye Bye, in competition with Kezah and Freddy Gladieux, who composed the song Mirador with the same constraints. They were then judged by the singer/rapper Gims who designated Mirador as the "winning summer hit". The two singles have had some success, going so far as to be performed live at the Solidays 2019 music festival by their authors. They have also been broadcast in several nightclubs and on national radio stations such as Fun Radio. The two singles are classified in the sales rankings of several musical platforms and the title Mirador has even been officially certified gold.

=== Gaming ===
Squeezie, along with Gotaga and Brawks, founded a French-based esports organization known as Gentle Mates. They have multiple esports teams competing in games like Valorant, League of Legends, and Age of Empires. Squeezie also has his own YouTube channel entirely dedicated to gaming, which he made in 2018, and has now over 5.1 million subscribers and totals roughly 3 billion views.

== Discography ==
=== Albums ===
- 2020: Oxyz

=== Singles ===
- 2017: Placements de produits feat. Maxenss
- 2018: Freestyle de l'autodérision
- 2018: Top 1
- 2018: Freestyle de potes feat. Maxenss and Seb la Frite
- 2018: Pas tout seul
- 2018: 90 VS 2000 feat. Mcfly and Carlito
- 2019: Le gaming c'est fini
- 2019: Bye bye feat. Joyca
- 2020: Influenceurs
- 2020: Guépard feat. Némir
- 2020: Servis feat. Gambi
- 2020: Tout
- 2020: Mario Kart
- 2021: Time Time feat. KronoMuzik and Myd (as Trei Degete)
- 2021: Arrêtez
- 2022: Adieu les filles
- 2023: Spaceship (as Trei Degete)

== Filmography ==
=== Dubbing ===
==== Cinema ====
- 2015: The SpongeBob Movie: Sponge Out of Water by Paul Tibbitt: Kyle the Seagull (French voice)
- 2016: Ratchet & Clank by Kevin Munroe: Ratchet (French voice)

==== Web-series ====
- 2016: Les Kassos (episode 42, Irrito)
- 2018: L'Épopée temporelle (season 2, episode 1, Le temps cassé) by Cyprien Iov
- 2015: Technophobe by Théodore Bonnet
- 2016: The Cartouche by Théodore Bonnet

== Awards and nominations ==
Ceremony	Year	Category	Result	Ref.
The Streamer Awards	2025	Best International Streamer	Nominated	
The Streamer Awards	2025	Best Streamed Event (GP Explorer 3)	Nominated	

== See also ==
- List of most-followed Twitch channels
