= Lofi Girl =

French YouTube channel and music label

- Logo used since 2024

Instagram information
- Page: lofigirl
- Followers: 1.4 million

TikTok information
- Page: lofigirl
- Followers: 1.5 million

X information
- Handle: @lofigirl
- Followers: 263 thousand

YouTube information
- Channels: Lofi Girl; Lofi Records; Lofi Studio
- Years active: 2017–present
- Genre: Music radio
- Subscribers: 15.8 million
- Views: 2.608 billion
- Last updated: 2 June 2026
- Website: lofigirl.com

Lofi Girl (formerly ChilledCow until 2021) is a French YouTube channel and music label established in 2017. It provides livestreams of lo-fi hip hop music 24/7, accompanied by a Japanese-style animation of a girl (officially named Jade) studying or relaxing in her bedroom with a cat on the window.

== Format ==
The channel offers several videos and livestreams of lo-fi music in hip hop style. The best known video is a live stream of lo-fi music that has run for several years.

The music is either released through the ChilledCow label, or used with permission from the artist.

The music is always live, preventing YouTube from putting ads that could cut the stream.

The playlist is updated fairly frequently. The music broadcast by the channel can be used to practice "deep work". According to Emma Winston of the University of London, the success of the channel comes from the music that "seems familiar to the listener, like a past time gone and fantasized that did not really exist".

Fareid El Gafy writes in the Washington Square News, "Thanks to this playlist, I've cranked out a multitude of essays, study sessions, scripts and rough cuts to the tune of pop culture samples, muted snares and artificial record scratches."

Lee Taber, Leya Breanna Baltaxe-Admony and Kevin Weatherwax of the University of California, Santa Cruz, showed in a study that parasocial interactions can be applied to characters such as the Lofi Girl.

== Mascot ==
The Lofi Girl, studying in winter

Lofi Girl streams are accompanied by an animation of a girl studying or relaxing who has come to be known as the Lofi Girl, the Lofi Study Girl, or the "24/7 lofi hip hop beats" girl (officially named Jade). She is depicted with headphones on, occasionally glancing at her cat sitting on the windowsill. The channel began using the Lofi Girl for its streams in March 2018.

Creator Dimitri Somoguy originally used the character Shizuku Tsukishima from the Studio Ghibli film Whisper of the Heart (1995) as the face of the channel, with footage of her studying or writing used in the streams. When the popularity of the streams ultimately led to the channel being taken down for copyright violations, Somoguy decided to maintain the Ghibli-esque aesthetic but with an original character and put out a call for artists.

One of the artists who responded was Juan Pablo Machado. Originally from Colombia, Machado moved to Lyon in 2013 to study at the École Émile-Cohl, after a stint at the art school of Bogotá. In September 2018, during his last year of his master's degree, he decided to respond to a call for tenders received by his school. The tender from ChilledCow called for a "student busy revising for her classes, with Miyazaki-esque visuals." Machado, who was not previously familiar with the lo-fi aesthetic, decided to send in his sketches. Several positions were tested for the Lofi Girl, including a lying position, at the end of which she would return to her initial position; this did not carry over into the final product because it took too long to animate. The background was originally plain black in order to save animation time, but Machado eventually decided to place La Croix-Rousse (Lyon, France) in the window instead.

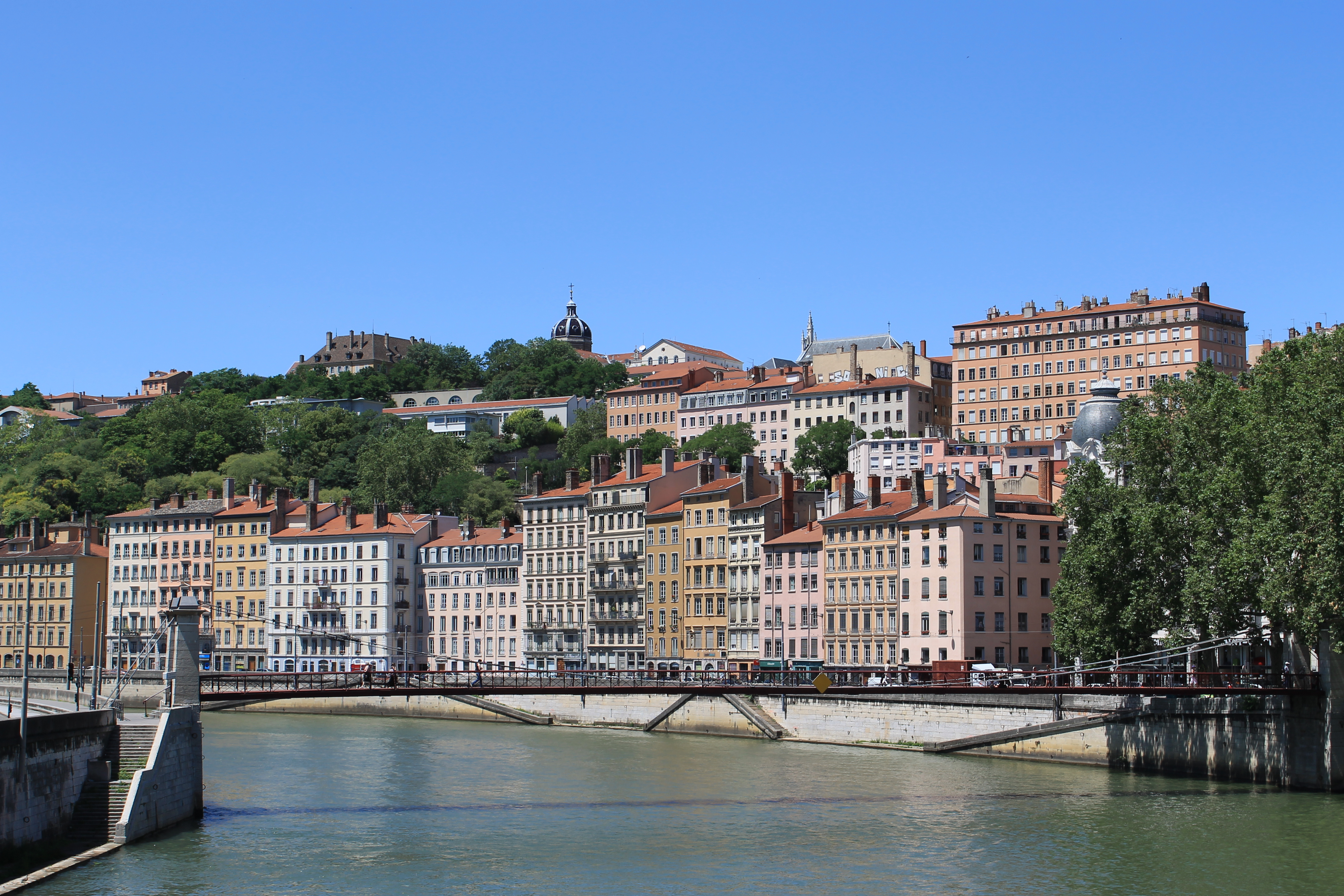
The view through the window of Lofi Girl's study is La Croix-Rousse hill in Lyon, France.

On 11 November 2023, Lofi Girl's X (formerly Twitter) account posted a shot of her gazing longingly out the window. In a picture posted on 12 November, she pondered a framed photograph. Shortly after, both she and "Synthwave Boy" disappeared from their respective streams, and their streams were replaced by a stream of a snowflake forming over the course of several hours. When the snowflake finished forming, a new animated music video premiered featuring both Lofi Girl and a Synthwave Boy.

== History ==
=== Creation and initial suspensions ===
The YouTube channel "ChilledCow" was created by Dimitri Somoguy on 18 March 2015. ChilledCow began streaming lo-fi hip hop music, branding it as relaxation music for those who are working or studying on 25 February 2017.

The live stream was taken down by YouTube between July and August 2017 for using footage of the character Shizuku Tsukishima studying from the animated film Whisper of the Heart (1995). In September 2017, the livestream was reinstated with a custom animation of a girl studying.

In February 2020, YouTube briefly removed the channel without explanation, but reinstated it after a public backlash. The original live stream that was stopped by the take-down was 13,000 hours long, making it one of the longest videos on YouTube.

=== Renaming and subsequent history ===
First logo of Lofi Girl from 2021 to 2024

On 18 March 2021, six years after the creation of the channel, it was announced that the channel would rebrand from ChilledCow to Lofi Girl. The YouTube community posts explained how Lofi Girl had become the icon of the channel, and that it would fit as the new channel name.

On 2 February 2022, the channel reached the milestone of ten million subscribers. The stream that was on at the time had been running since 22 February 2020, and had over seven million likes. The channel celebrated this by having a party event in the chat.

On 10 July 2022, YouTube took down two of the channel's streams ("beats to relax/study to" and "beats to chill/sleep to") after receiving a Digital Millennium Copyright Act takedown request from Malaysian record label FMC Music Sdn Bhd. The two streams had nearly 800 million combined views and had been streaming continuously for about 21,000 hours each. YouTube later confirmed that the copyright infringement claims were "abusive" and that the claimant's channel had been terminated. Lofi Girl resumed streaming on 12 July. According to a spokesman for FMC Music, the copyright claims were filed by hackers who had gained access to the company's YouTube account. Following the incident, Lofi Girl criticized YouTube for not investigating the claims more thoroughly and for not providing content creators an opportunity to appeal false claims.

Beginning on 18 March 2025, Lofi Girl celebrated its tenth anniversary with a week-long anniversary event.

On 29 July 2025, the channel broadcast a video showing Lofi Girl closing her computer, which displayed the words "The End", before dressing in a ceremonial dress and a graduation cap. This step elicited strong emotion among the community of followers. However, the character remains present on the Lofi Girl YouTube channel, and the video was only a humorous moment for the fans.

== Juan Pablo Machado ==
Juan Pablo Machado is a Colombian-French artist best known for his animation work on the channel. Machado is originally from Cali, Colombia. After a stint at an art school in Bogotá, he moved to Lyon in 2013 to study at the École Émile-Cohl. He left the École Émile-Cohl in 2018. In 2017, during his final year of study, he decided to respond to a call for artists received by his school. The call came from the channel.

The founder of the channel wanted "a student busy reviewing her courses, with a visual in the style of Miyazaki". According to Machado, "I didn’t know anything about hip-hop lofi hip-hop, nor did I draw my style from Japanese animation. I took it as a challenge". Several positions for the character were tested, including a lying position, at the end of which the character would return to her initial position; the lying position was unused because it was too long to animate. The background was originally left black to save time, However, the idea to show the passage of time emerged, and Machado decided to make Lyon's La Croix-Rousse hill appear by the window, with the sky changing to match the time of day.

== Other projects ==
=== Synthwave channel launch ===
On 11 April 2023, the channel launched a third live stream, "synthwave radio 🌌 - beats to chill/game to", featuring a boy with his pet dog next to him sitting in front of a desktop computer. The extensive teaser campaign accompanied the stream's launch: On 10 April 2023, the animation of the Lofi Girl and her cat disappeared. The audio music stream continued with a still visual background, but without record and track labels. Over the course of 24 hours, the video slowly zoomed in towards the open blue window. On 11 April at 5:00 pm UTC, the blue room could be clearly seen, and a new character entered with a small dog and began typing at a computer. The community dubbed the unnamed boy, "Synthwave Boy", "Synth Boy" or just "Lofi Boy". The following day, Lofi Girl's YouTube channel uploaded the character's entry animation with the title "Synthwave Launch 🌌 - Lofi Boy POV", confirming the new character's name. As of February 2024, this stream has been inactive for seven months. On 2 July 2023, a new stream was created, and the former removed from the channel. As of May 2024, this stream is live.

=== Snowman music video ===
In November 2023, the Lofi Girl and Synthwave Boy disappeared from their respective live shows. A third livestream showing a snowflake forming subsequently appeared on the channel.

This event led up to channel releasing its first music video, "Snowman". The clip begins with Lofi Girl reading a book on a public bench. As the snow begins to fall, a flake falls on her hand. A flashback shows a young Lofi Girl playing in a snowy forest. A woman, presumably her mother, makes her put on a scarf before she runs off to play some more. She and a man who appears to be her father finish making a snowman before they stop to look up at a constellation. After the flashback ends, the clip returns to Lofi Girl in the present shedding tears as she quickly walks through the city of Lyon. She walks past Synthwave Boy, bumping into him and dropping her book by accident. She continues walking regardless of that. The video ends with Lofi Girl stopping to look up at the same constellation she and her father looked up at in the flashback.

=== Peaceful Piano and Dark Ambient radio launch ===
On 22 February 2024, the Lofi Girl and Synthwave Boy disappeared from their respective streams, with a video posted onto the channel showing the two characters putting on their shoes and taking items from their apartments. The video ended with a teaser for an upcoming event on 26 February. On 26 February 2024, two new streams were uploaded to the channel, titled "☀️" and "🌙", respectively. At 6:00 pm GMT+1, both streams went live and allowed viewers to take part in an interactive choose-your-own-adventure style event, where viewers could pick the item each character took with them by voting in the livestream chat. They could also choose the direction that each character would walk. The characters would walk to the Parc de la Tête d'Or, located in Lyon, France, where Synthwave Boy placed a note on a bench for Lofi Girl to discover, presumably on the next day.

After several minutes of a looping animation of both characters on the park bench, they would return to their respective locations, where it was revealed that the event was to launch two new livestreams with genres focusing on peaceful piano and dark ambience respectively.

=== Lofi Café ===
A Lofi Girl themed café, named Lofi Café, is set to open in Paris in early 2027.

=== Lofi House ===
On 17 September 2026, the Lofi Girl launched a house music stream called "Lofi House". The mascot appearing in the streams is Lofi Teacher (officially named Julien Maison). He is depicted as a "30-year-old high-school biology educator".

=== Collaborations ===
==== Lego ====
In September 2023, the Lofi Girl channel announced a partnership with The Lego Group, releasing a mix titled "Lofi Girl – chill beats for LEGO building" featuring a Lego version of Lofi Girl.

==== Chess.com ====
In December 2023, the YouTube channel released a video titled "Lofi Girl x Chess.com ♟ - chill beats to play chess to" in partnership with the internet chess site Chess.com. But a year later, Lofi Girl also collaborated again with Chess.com, with releasing a new Synthwave album tittled "Lofi Girl x Chess.com - Synthwave beats to play chess to ♟️".

==== Renault ====
In March 2024, the channel of the French automobile manufacturer Renault broadcast a video with a character who looks like the Lofi Girl. It is a collaboration to announce the new Renault 5.

==== Fortnite ====
In May 2024, the channel announced the establishment of a space on Fortnite.

==== Gentle Mates ====
In July 2024, the e-sports structure, Gentle Mates announced on their various social networks the arrival of Lofi Girl as main sponsor, who will accompany them during their competitions. This collaboration has even led to the Lofi Girl M8 racing team ahead of the third and final GP Explorer 3: The Last Race event—a Formula 4 (F4) automobile competition which took place 3–5 October 2025. The driving team is made up of two notable French esport personalities from Gentle Mates: M8 founder Gotaga (Corentin Houssein) and manager of the Fortnite team Nikof (Nicolas Frejavise).

==== Zenless Zone Zero ====
In July 2024, the video game company MiHoYo collaborated with Lofi Girl to release a Zenless Zone Zero-themed video with lofi remixes of the game's songs.

==== Sega ====
In 2024, the channel partnered with Sega to celebrate the tenth anniversary of the release of the game Alien: Isolation.

==== Ubisoft ====
In March 2025, Ubisoft collaborated with Lofi Girl to release an Assassin's Creed Shadows-themed video with Lofi remixes of the game's songs.

==== Spirit City: Lofi Sessions ====
In 2024, development studio and publisher Mooncube Games released Spirit City: Lofi Sessions, a game inspired by the aesthetics of Lofi Girl. On August 11, 2025, Mooncube Games announced an official partnership with Lofi Girl, bringing Lofi Girl music into the game as collected albums.

==== The Sims ====
In March 2026, The Sims also collaborated with Lofi Girl to release The Sims-themed video with Lofi remixes of the game's songs.

==== Secret Lair ====
In August 2026, Lofi Girl also collaborated with Magic: the Gathering's Secret Lair product line, with releasing a video titled "Lofi Girl x Secret Lair - beats to cast to 💫" and a collection of Magic: the Gathering trading cards.

== Viewership ==
In February 2020, the main live "lofi hip hop radio - beats to relax/study to" was viewed 218 million times, and in July 2022 more than 668 million. In 2023, an average of 40,000 people are connected every day at the same time.

In 2024, the channel is among the 10 most watched channels in France and the main live "lofi hip hop radio - beats to relax/study to" is considered by the Nouvel Observateur as one of the "20 [videos] that have marked the platform."

== Reception and cultural impact ==
Lofi Girl's viewership has since been released to acclaim and developed ever since the beginning of the live stream. Fareid El Gafy from Washington Square News praised the live stream about studying, saying "Thanks to this playlist, I've cranked out a multitude of essays, study sessions, scripts and rough cuts to the tune of pop culture samples, muted snares and artificial record scratches." Xavier Piedra of Mashable praised it for its relaxing songs that keep the listener focused. He also noted that the playlist is updated frequently and often contains a mixture of old and newly added songs. The live stream was the first live stream listed on Cassidy Quinn of KGW's "Top 10 non-news live channels to watch on YouTube while social distancing". Quinn described the songs in the live stream as "a constant stream of low-key music you play in the background while you get work done, do chores, whatever you're doing at home right now". ChilledCow's lofi hip-hop playlist was also named the best lo-fi beats playlist by Red Bull. In 2021, The A.V. Club claimed that lo-fi beats to relax and study "turns the average person into a superhuman academic whose powers of concentration are rivaled only by headphone-wearing cartoon girls sitting at their desks during rainy days", while Rolling Stone said that "Lo-fi's slow, smooth beats aren't just for studying and working. They represent the revenge of producers who have found a way to put their talent to good use in difficult times." Amid the peak of the COVID-19 pandemic, Dazed Digital writer Sophia Atkinson referred to Lofi Girl as a "social distancing role model", it seemingly being "crystal clear that the anime girl was always operating in a post-COVID reality".

=== In popular culture ===
The character quickly went viral, and was established as an Internet meme. She has been referenced in popular culture. An example is contained within Steven Universe Future, where the character Connie is depicted studying in the same pose and environment as the Girl. In September 2020, a trend started on Reddit whereby the Lofi Girl would be redrawn to match the context of a certain country or place. Will Smith has also published his own version, replacing the study girl with Smith wearing a Bel-Air hoodie.

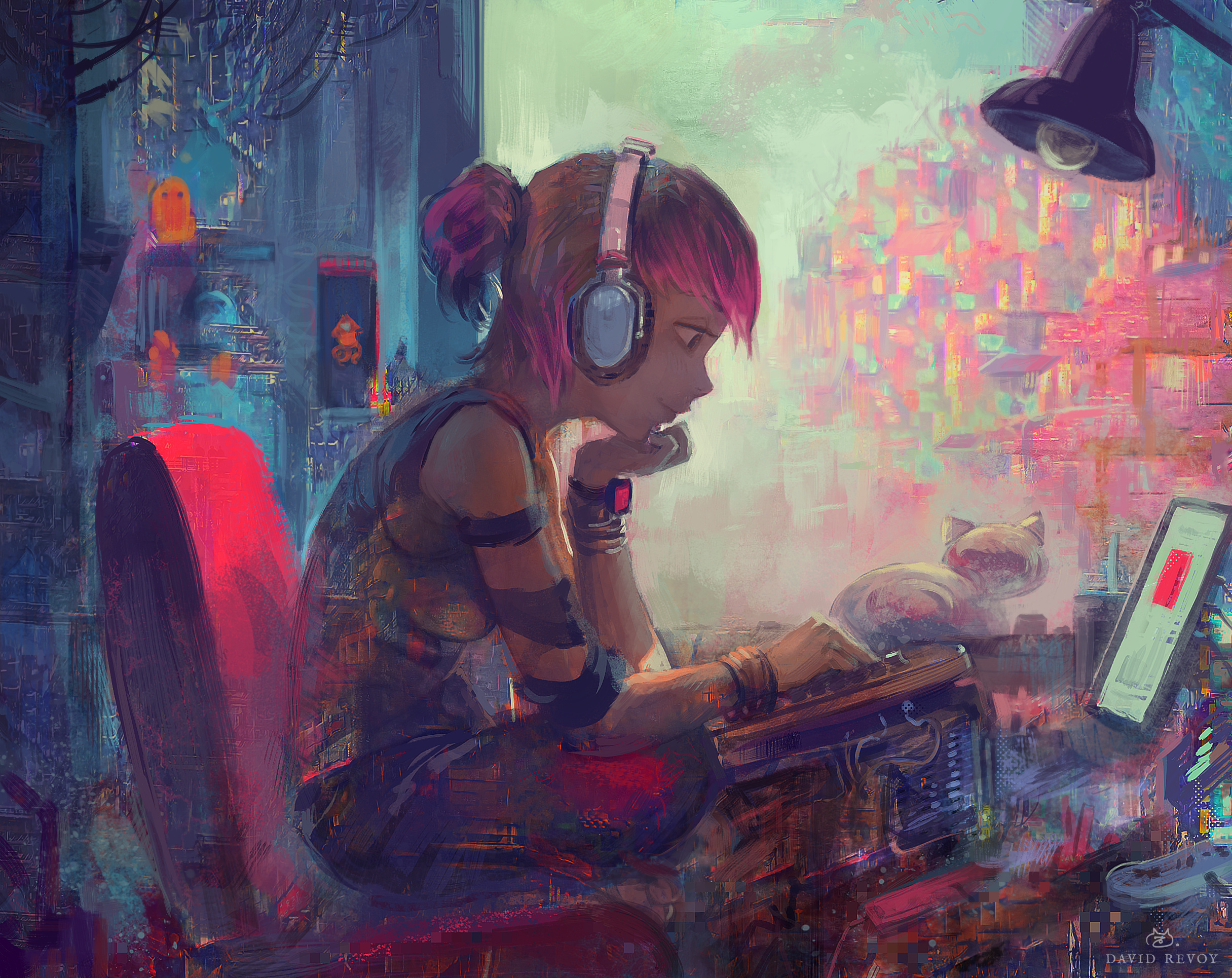
An artwork inspired by Lofi Girl and cyberpunk by David Revoy. Drawing done in Krita.

In 2019, a similar YouTube channel named "College Music" partnered with McCann London, Vice Media, and Samaritans to create a PSA promoting mental health awareness that starred a character similar to Lofi Girl. Titled "what happened to our study girl?", it initially depicted her studying before suddenly having a stress-induced mental breakdown, and considers committing suicide with a knife before ultimately deciding against it. The video ends with a message imploring people struggling with suicidal thoughts to seek help, with the video providing links and numbers of various hotlines. College Music said they were inspired to make the PSA after noticing that an increasing number of users were using the channel's live chat box to talk about the stress they're going through, and that a small number admitted to having suicidal thoughts. McCann's chief creative officer Laurence Thomson said they went with the partnership because "If students are using these lo-fi channels as chat forums to talk about suicide and stress – then this seemed like the perfect place to offer support".

To promote the release of the new expansion Shadowlands, the official YouTube account for MMORPG World of Warcraft posted a Warcraft-themed parody of Lofi Girl's "Lofi beats to relax/study to" stream. Youtooz released a one-foot-tall replica of the lo-fi anime girl, complete with a desk and school supplies. In 2022, Disney released a compilation album of lofi remakes of Disney songs. The album was promoted as having been compiled by Minnie Mouse, and critics pointed out obvious influences from Lofi Girl. Italian rapper Tha Supreme released in the summer of 2022 an animated music video for the single Siri, featuring a scene of the singer's anime-styled depiction drawn in the same setting and pose of Lofi Girl.

In 2022, Paradox Development Studio released lofi versions of the soundtracks to Crusader Kings 3 and Victoria 3 on YouTube. Both videos featured parodies of Lofi Girl based on the historical setting of the games.

=== In politics ===
Video uploaded by former British prime minister Boris Johnson of his speeches over lo-fi music

During the 2019 United Kingdom general election, then prime minister Boris Johnson released a video parodying the channel titled "Lo fi boriswave beats to relax/get brexit done to", featuring a picture of Johnson riding a train while his campaign speeches play over lo-fi music.

In 2023, Taiwan presidential frontrunner Lai Ching-te launched a 24-hour lofi beats channel featuring an anime-styled boy studying with his dog. The 24-hour channel launched on 27 September 2023, on the 30th anniversary of the party and crowdsourced much of its playlist. The initiative was covered by regional media and received submissions from television stars, high school students, as well as one Taiwan mayor. Lai also released lofi versions of Democratic Progressive Party campaign anthems from 1996 to 2024 featuring the same characters.
