= Fava of Manosque =

Fava of Manosque was a Jewish physician and surgeon known to practice medicine in the early 14th century in Provence, France. She is sometimes known as Hava or Hana of Manosque.

As one of many Jewish medical practitioners during the Middle Ages, Fava apparently received her training from family members. She was part of a prominent medical family with her mother (Astrugus), husband, son (Bonafos) and two grandsons also practicing surgery. At the time, medical training was restricted. "Since they were not allowed into the medical schools, Jewish doctors, both male and female, learned through apprenticeship to other doctors." They were known to treat the maladies of Christian men and women as well as members of the Jewish community.

In late 1321 or early 1322 Fava was charged with inappropriately treating a Christian man with injuries to his testicles, which were described at the time as "the most intimate organs of his body." In court, she was asked if she had palpated the wound, but she denied this saying she had merely described the procedure to her son, Bonafos, who had conducted all physical contact with the patient, though she had examined the wound and dictated the medicines used in the procedure.
