= Reinold Geiger =

Austrian billionaire businessman

- Born: 10 July 1947 (age 77); Dornbirn, Austria
- Education: Swiss Federal Institute of Technology; INSEAD
- Occupation: Businessman
- Title: Chairman and CEO, L'Occitane en Provence
- Spouse: Dominique Maze-Sencier (died 2017)
- Children: 3

Reinold Geiger (born 10 July 1947) is an Austrian billionaire, and the chairman and executive director of French cosmetics retailer L'Occitane en Provence. On the 2023 Forbes list, he was the 9th richest Austrian with a net worth of US$ 1.4 billion.

== Education and career ==
Geiger, the son of a carpenter, received a bachelor's degree in engineering from the Swiss Federal Institute of Technology in Zürich, in 1969 and an MBA degree from INSEAD in Fontainebleau (France) in 1976. After graduating he founded several small companies, including a tourism company in London.

In 1978, Geiger founded the AMS Packaging Company in Paris, which specialized in the production of cosmetics packaging. He later sold the company at a profit. In 1994, Geiger started investing millions in the then small cosmetics company L'Occitane and took over the management. He expanded the company into a global group and it was listed on the Hong Kong stock exchange in May 2010.

In 2021, he stepped down as CEO of L’Occitane but remained chairman and executive director of the company. Geiger owned 70 percent of the company in 2023.

Forbes lists his net worth at USD 2.4 billion, as of February 2024.

== Personal life ==
Geiger was married to Dominique Maze-Sencier until her death in May 2017. The couple had 3 sons, Maximilien, Nicolas and Adrien. Geiger lives in Geneva, Switzerland. He owns properties in the alps, on the Île de Ré and in Trancoso, Brazil.
