= René Frégni =

French novelist

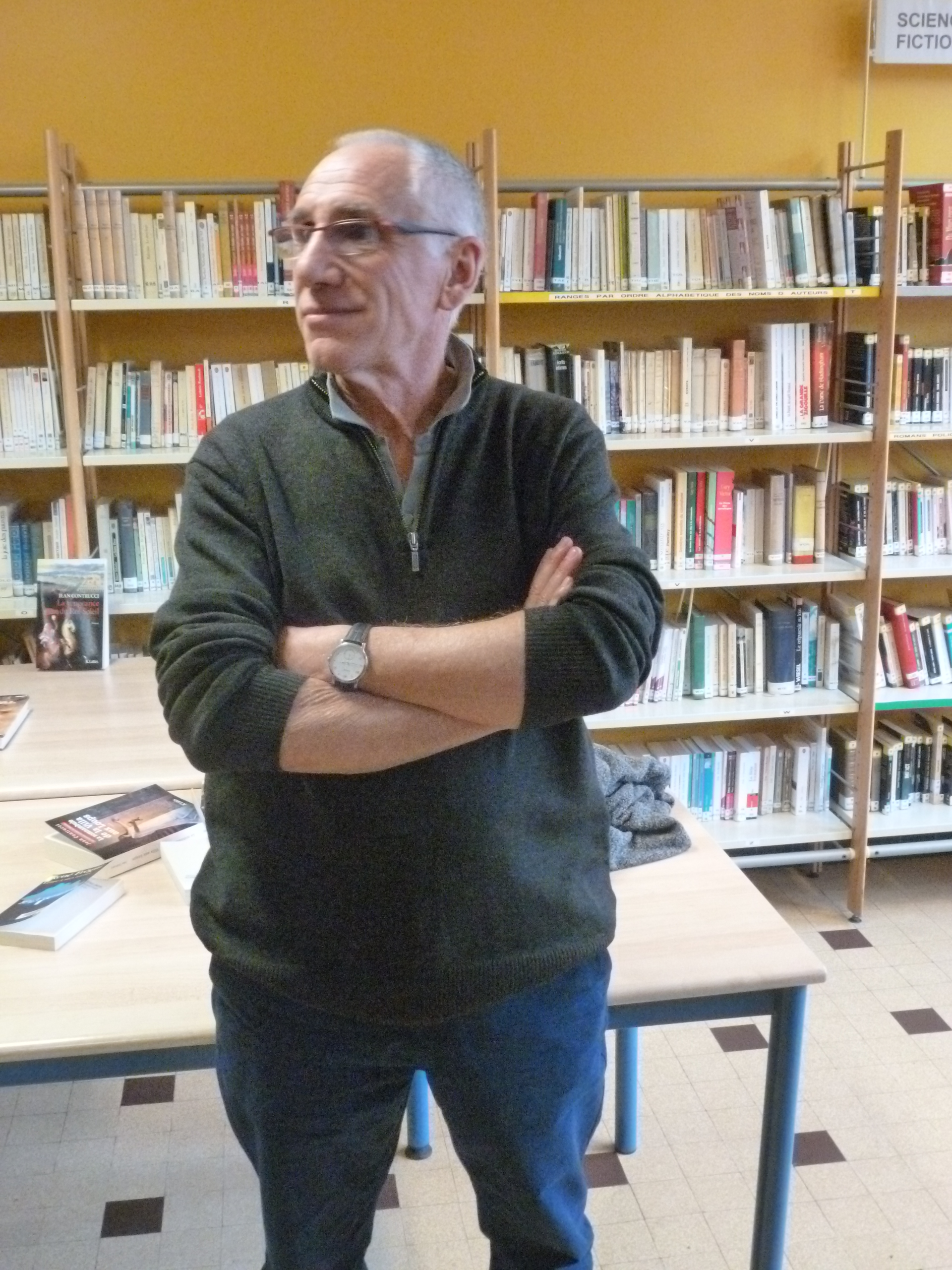
- Frégni in 2014
- Born: 8 July 1947 (age 79); Marseille, France
- Occupation: Novelist

René Frégni (born 1947) is a French novelist.

== Early life ==
Frégni was born in 1947 in Marseille.

== Career ==
Frégni owned a restaurant on the main square of Manosque, which he sold after his business associate was arrested for money laundering. He wrote about the experience in his 2004 novel entitled Lettre à mes tueurs.

Frégni is the author of 15 novels. He won the Prix Eugène-Dabit du roman populiste for Les chemins noirs in 1989. He also won the Prix Mottart from the Académie française for Tendresse des loups in 1990. He also the Prix Paul-Léautaud for Elle danse dans le noir in 1998, the Prix Antigone for On ne s'endort jamais seul in 2001, the Prix Monte-Cristo for Tu tomberas avec la nuit in 2009, and the Prix Jean-Carrière for La Fiancée des corbeaux in 2011. Moreover, he won the Targa Jean Giono in 2012.

== Personal life ==
Frégni resides in Manosque. His daughter lives in Montpellier.

== Works ==
- Frégni, René (1988). Les Chemins noirs. Paris: Denoël. ISBN 9782207235157. OCLC 416696617.
- Frégni, René (1990). Tendresse des loups. Paris: Denoël. ISBN 9782207236710. OCLC 911342783.
- Frégni, René (1992). Les Nuits d'Alice. Paris: Denoël. ISBN 9782207239346. OCLC 26958313.
- Frégni, René (1994). Le Voleur d'innocence. Paris: Gallimard. ISBN 9782072575471. OCLC 937653529.
- Frégni, René (1996). Où se perdent les hommes?. Paris: Denoél. ISBN 9782070413638. OCLC 84580257.
- Frégni, René (2001). Elle danse dans le noir. Paris: Gallimard. ISBN 9782070419890. OCLC 48514697.
- Frégni, René (2002). On ne s'endort jamais seul. Paris: Denoël. ISBN 9782070422548. OCLC 638953264.
- Frégni, René (2004). Lettre à mes tueurs. Paris: Gallimard. ISBN 9782070305537. OCLC 70874773.
- Frégni, René (2006). L'Été. Paris: Gallimard. ISBN 9782070339730. OCLC 71138607.
- Frégni, René (2008). Maudit le jour. Paris: Gallimard. ISBN 9782070344215. OCLC 271806528.
- Frégni, René (2008). Tu tomberas avec la nuit. Paris: Denoël. ISBN 9782070398218. OCLC 668196788.
- Frégni, René (2012). La Fiancée des corbeaux. Paris: Gallimard. ISBN 9782070448289. OCLC 829976100.
- Frégni, René (2014). Sous la ville rouge. Paris: Gallimard. ISBN 9782072560439. OCLC 937062924.
- Frégni, René (2016). Je me souviens de tous vos rêves. Paris: Gallimard. ISBN 9782070107049. OCLC 948667907.
- Frégni, René (2017). Les Vivants au prix des morts. Paris: Gallimard. ISBN 9782072732829. OCLC 985661997.
