= Sol de Janeiro =

Viral American skincare and fragrance brand

- Industry: Personal Care
- Founded: 2015, New York, US
- Founder: Heela Yang, Marc Capra, Camila Pierotti
- Headquarters: New York City, U.S., United States of America
- Area served: Worldwide
- Key people: Jordan Saxemard (CEO)
- Products: Fragrance and body care
- Number of employees: 464 (2024)
- Parent: Groupe L'Occitane
- Website: soldejaneiro.com

Sol de Janeiro, which means "Sun of January," is an American skincare and fragrance brand founded in 2015 by Heela Yang, Marc Capra, and Camila Pierotti. Sol de Janeiro products are inspired by Brazilian beach culture and are known for their signature scent base of pistachio and vanilla. The brand is majority-owned by Groupe L'Occitane. Jordan Saxemard was named CEO in April 2026, following the exit of cofounder and CEO Heela Yang.

After launching at Sephora in 2016, Sol de Janeiro grew through social media and influencer marketing, and became Sephora's top selling brand in 2024. The brand is best known for its Brazilian Bum Bum Cream and its Cheirosa fragrance mists. It has since expanded beyond Sephora to other retailers, including Ulta Beauty, and was recognized by Fast Company and TIME in 2024.

== History ==
Sol de Janeiro was founded in 2015 by Heela Yang, Marc Capra, and Camila Pierotti. All three founders were connected to Brazil in some way, as Pierotti is from Rio de Janeiro, and Yang and Capra had lived in Brazil for some time. The idea for the brand started from a message the founders wanted to convey, rather than the product itself. They wanted to share the beauty culture of Rio's beaches, where beauty is about feeling good in their own bodies, rather than trying to fit into one set beauty standard. Once they knew the message they wanted to put out, the founders decided to focus their products on body care.

To get their products into stores, the founders pitched their brand to Sephora, and according to Yang, the meeting went so well that Sephora offered them a contract that same day. In the following years, the brand's product range had expanded into hair, bath, lip, and fragrance, even though Sol de Janeiro was still best known for its original Brazilian Bum Bum Cream.

In 2021, Groupe L'Occitane acquired a majority stake in Sol de Janeiro, taking 83% ownership of the brand at a valuation of US$450 million. According to L'Occitane, acquiring Sol de Janeiro was meant to strengthen its brand lineup across global markets, and the deal was expected to help Sol de Janeiro expand beyond the United States.

In April 2026, brand cofounder Heela Yang stepped down as CEO and was succeeded by Jordan Saxemard. Klitos Teklos served as interim chief creative officer at Sol de Janeiro into 2026 before becoming Tory Burch's first chief brand officer.

== Products ==
Sol de Janeiro became well known for its Brazilian Bum Bum Cream, which is a body cream that has a sweet, gourmand scent. The brand named the cream's scent Cheirosa 62. In Brazil, cheirosa means "smelling delicious", and each fragrance in the Cheirosa collection has a number that represents a specific mood, moment, or cultural reference. The scent became so popular among customers that in 2020, Sol de Janeiro released Cheirosa 62 as a fragrance mist. The brand positioned its fragrance mists as a more upscale option at the time, since body mists were mostly associated with large mall retailers like Victoria's Secret and Bath & Body Works. Sol de Janeiro continued to expand its Cheirosa collection with more scents, including floral fragrances like Cheirosa 68 and Cheirosa 40.

By 2025, fragrance mists had become the brand's best-selling category, outselling its original body care products. Even with fragrance mists leading the brand's sales, Sol de Janeiro continued to expand in the body care category, launching its first body lotion called Body Badalada in May 2025. The lotion was sold exclusively at Sephora and on the Sol de Janeiro website.

In 2026, Sol de Janeiro continued expanding its product line, adding several new lotions to the Body Badalada collection after the original lotion's success. That same year, it also released its first solid fragrance called the Jelly perfume balm, which is available in three different Cheirosa scents. Additionally, in July 2026 Sol de Janeiro launched its first fragrance line created for men, which is made up of two cologne mists, Cheiroso 10 and Cheiroso 7. This fragrance line takes inspiration from Brazilian soccer culture, and its release was intentionally timed with the 2026 FIFA World Cup.

== Retail and growth ==
After launching in 2015, Sol de Janeiro's retail presence grew quickly. The brand's partnership with Sephora started in 2016. The original Brazilian Bum Bum Cream and foot cream sold well on Sephora's website, which led to the products landing in stores nationwide just a few weeks later. In 2020, during the COVID-19 pandemic, Sol de Janeiro shifted its focus from in person events to selling online. According to the founder Yang, the company's digital business tripled and accounted for nearly half of the company's total sales. After years of being exclusively sold at Sephora, Sol de Janeiro started to expand to other retailers, entering Dufry duty free stores in 2023, and Ulta Beauty in 2024. Also by 2024, Sol de Janeiro had become Sephora's top selling brand.

Social media played a significant role in Sol de Janeiro's growth in 2023, when the Brazilian Bum Bum Cream went viral on TikTok after large influencers, including Alix Earle, organically posted about the product. Cofounder Yang credited social media for more than 90% of the company's growth that year, highlighting that this growth came from organic posts rather than paid content. That growth was reflected in the brand's sales, as L'Occitane reported that sales rose 174% to $454 million from April to September 2023. By 2024, Sol de Janeiro's net sales had grown to €686.1 million ($780 million).

== Marketing ==
Sol de Janeiro puts social media content creators at the center of its marketing and was working with over 6,000 influencers by 2024. In 2023, the brand's fragrance mists generated a combined 850 million views on TikTok. In December 2023, a Sephora customer review claimed that Sol de Janeiro's new Delícia Drench Body Butter attracted wolf spiders, a claim that spread on social media through Reddit, TikTok, and X. The brand responded on social media, posting an Instagram story and commenting on TikTok videos to deny the rumor and say none of its products contain the chemicals said to attract spiders.

With in person events on hold in 2020, Sol de Janeiro focused its marketing on sending product samples to customers through partnerships. In 2023, Euphoria star Barbie Ferreira was chosen as a brand ambassador. As part of the partnership, Ferreira appeared in the brand's summer campaign, "Where Will They Take You," where she promoted limited edition fragrance mists. The campaign reportedly raised overall sales by 33%, with over 50 paid creators posting about it and generating more than $2 million in earned media value. Throughout 2023, Sol de Janeiro held pop ups in New York City and Los Angeles to celebrate becoming Sephora's top body care seller of all time. For the 2026 launch of its Cheiroso men's fragrance line, Sol de Janeiro released a campaign called "Play It Your Way", featuring Brazilian actor André Lamoglia and content creator Alejandro Rosario.

== Awards and honors ==
In 2023, Glossy included Sol de Janeiro in its Glossy 50 list. Fast Company named Sol de Janeiro to its 2024 list of the most innovative companies. That same year, TIME named the brand one of its TIME100 Most Influential Companies.
