= Olivier Baussan =

French businessman

- Born: 18 July 1952 (age 74); France
- Occupations: Cosmetics creator and businessman, company founder and CEO
- Awards: Knight of the Order of Agriculture (2009)

Olivier Baussan (born 18 July 1952) is a French cosmetics businessman and the founder of L'Occitane en Provence, Oliviers & Co and Première Pression Provence.

== Biography ==
=== Early life ===
Baussan completed his degree in literature at the Université d'Aix-en-Provence.

== Career ==
At the age of 23 he began to focus on creating cosmetic products from the flora of Provence.

The acquisition of an old soap factory that had been on the decline, in partnership with a chemist friend, Yves Millou, launched the growth of the small business. The group was created in 1976. In 1981 he opened his first store in Volx in Haute Provence. In 1992, he sold the company to Austrian businessman Reinold Geiger but retained a 5% stake.

Through l’Occitane en Provence he launched a brand of premium olive oil, Oliviers & Co, in 1996. Most of the oils sold through the company are produced by families or small cooperatives, all of whom must follow Baussan’s exacting methods of cultivation and production.

In July 2006, he opened the eco-museum of l’Olivier in Volx and, two years later, he opened the Première Pression Provence to commemorate the producers of olive oil in Provence.

== Philanthropy ==
He is Vice President of the L’Occitane Foundation, a charitable organization that focuses on the economic emancipation of women in Burkina Faso as well as the support for the visually impaired. The company decided in 1997 to include the names of products in braille on most of the packaging. He partnered with the Helen Keller Foundation to provide eye exams to schools in the Bronx, Brooklyn, and in Los Angeles. In addition, he decided that all the proceeds from the sale of L’Occitane’s “Animal Soaps Set” go to Orbis, a non-profit organization that works to fight blindness in developing countries.

== Awards ==
In 2009 Baussan received a medal of the Knight of the Order of Merit of Agriculture from Michel Barnier, the French minister of agriculture.

In February 2011 he was nominated by the Vanity Fair Hall of Fame for his philanthropic work.
