= L'Occitane en Provence =

French multinational cosmetics retailer

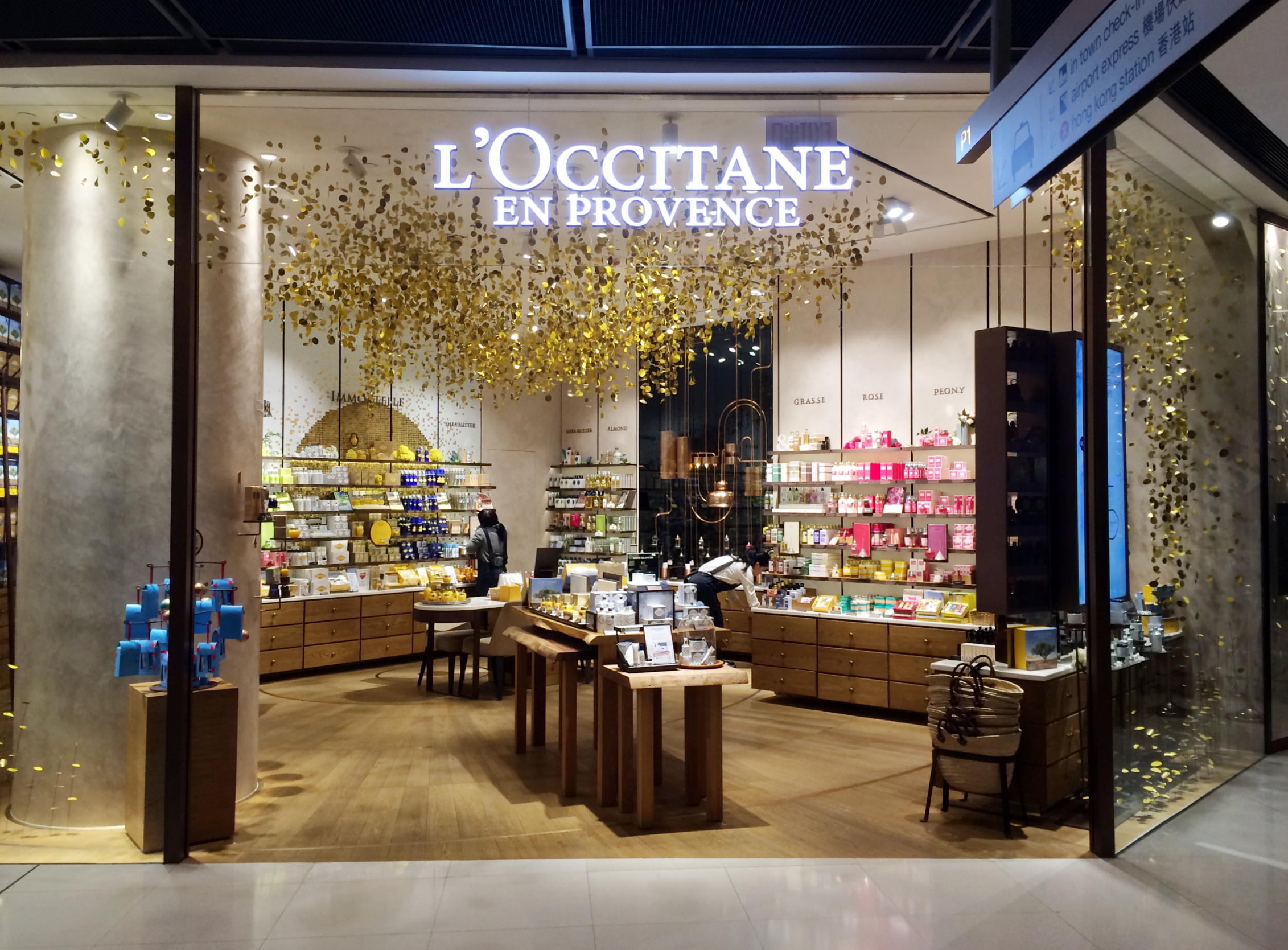
- L'Occitane storefront in the International Finance Centre, Hong Kong, 2016
- Type: S.A.
- Traded as: SEHK: 973
- Industry: Personal care
- Founded: 1976; 50 years ago
- Founder: Olivier Baussan
- Headquarters: Manosque, France
- Products: Cosmetics, beauty products
- Parent: Groupe L'Occitane
- Website: www.loccitane.com

L'Occitane en Provence (French pronunciation: [lɔk.si.tan ɑ̃ pʁɔ.vɑ̃s]), commonly known as L'Occitane, is a French retailer of body, face, hair, and home products, as well as fragrances. The company is based in Manosque, France, and was founded in 1976 by Olivier Baussan. In 2010, L’Occitane was listed on the Hong Kong Stock Exchange, and in 2024 its controlling shareholder, Reinold Geiger, moved to take the company private.

L’Occitane markets itself as a maison de beauté, or beauty house, emphasizing ingredients and traditions from the Provence region of southern France. It operates over 3,000 stores in more than 90 countries, with significant markets in Asia, Europe, and North America. The United States represents one of its largest retail and e-commerce markets.

The company is part of Groupe L'Occitane, which owns several beauty and wellness brands, including Melvita, Elemis, and Erborian. Its corporate strategy includes a focus on sustainability, ethical sourcing, and environmentally conscious packaging practices.

== History ==
=== Founding and early years ===
In 1976, 23-year-old Olivier Baussan began producing essential oil from wild rosemary and lavender using steam distillation, which he sold at open-air markets in his native Provence. The following year, he revived the traditional art of Marseille soap-making in Manosque using an old soap factory. The first L’Occitane factory and boutique opened in 1981 in Volx, a village in Provence. The company’s name, L’Occitane, is derived from the French term for “the woman from Occitania,” a historical region of southern France where the Occitan language was traditionally spoken. The name reflects the brand’s Provençal heritage.

=== Ownership changes and expansion ===
In the 1990s, Baussan sold a majority stake in the business to venture capital investors to finance expansion, which reduced his role in management.

In 1994, Austrian businessman Reinold Geiger acquired a 33% stake in the company and became majority shareholder in 1996. He invited Baussan to return as creative director, while shifting the company’s focus toward international marketing. In the late 1990s, the company adopted the name L’Occitane en Provence to emphasize its regional heritage and international appeal.

French cosmetics group Clarins became a financial investor in 2001 through a subscription of convertible debentures, eventually holding 23.3% of shares. In 2007, management executed a leveraged buyout, raising Geiger’s stake to 48.7% and reducing Clarins’ stake to 10%.

=== Global growth ===
In January 2021, the company’s U.S. unit filed for Chapter 11 bankruptcy in New Jersey, citing rent costs and the impact of the COVID-19 pandemic. The company exited bankruptcy in August 2021 with a restructuring plan that provided for full repayment of debts.

During the 2022 Russian invasion of Ukraine, the company initially announced it would keep its Russian stores open to protect employees from retaliation. Days later, L’Occitane reversed its position and closed its Russian shops and website, although operations later resumed under a separate local entity.

=== 50th anniversary ===
In line with L'Occitane's 50th anniversary in 2026, the retailer had a rebrand with its almond collection newly renamed as "Amande Sublime". Forbes magazine described the new packaging "more cohesive, sleek and sophisticated, but the heart of the brand remains the same." CEO Adrien Greiger stated: "50 years is both an achievement and a challenge... This anniversary opens a new chapter focused on a reasserted brand cause: Crafting life ties, with heart and reason. For the next 50 years, L’Occitane en Provence has undertaken to preserve its heritage while reinventing itself, by thinking globally, acting locally, and offering beauty inspiring to all generations."

In April 2026, L'Occitane appointed South Korean actor Park Bo-gum as its 50th anniversary brand ambassador for his "warm and authentic image" which "aligns with the brand's philosophy of respecting nature and people".

== Beauty products ==
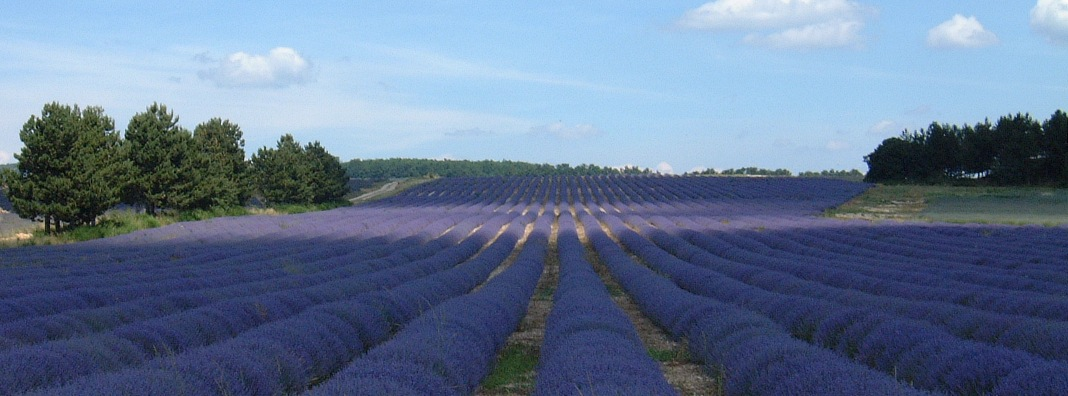
Lavender fields in Provence

All of L’Occitane’s products are developed and produced at its facility in Manosque, which employs about 1,000 people. The company sources a significant share of raw materials from Provence, including lavender and almonds, and has supported programs to encourage traditional cultivation in the region.

In Corsica, L’Occitane established fields of immortelle (Helichrysum italicum), a flowering plant used in its skincare lines, in collaboration with local producers seeking to maintain traditional cultivation practices. The company has also worked with organisations such as the Office National Interprofessionel des Plantes à Parfum to support aromatic and scented plant production.

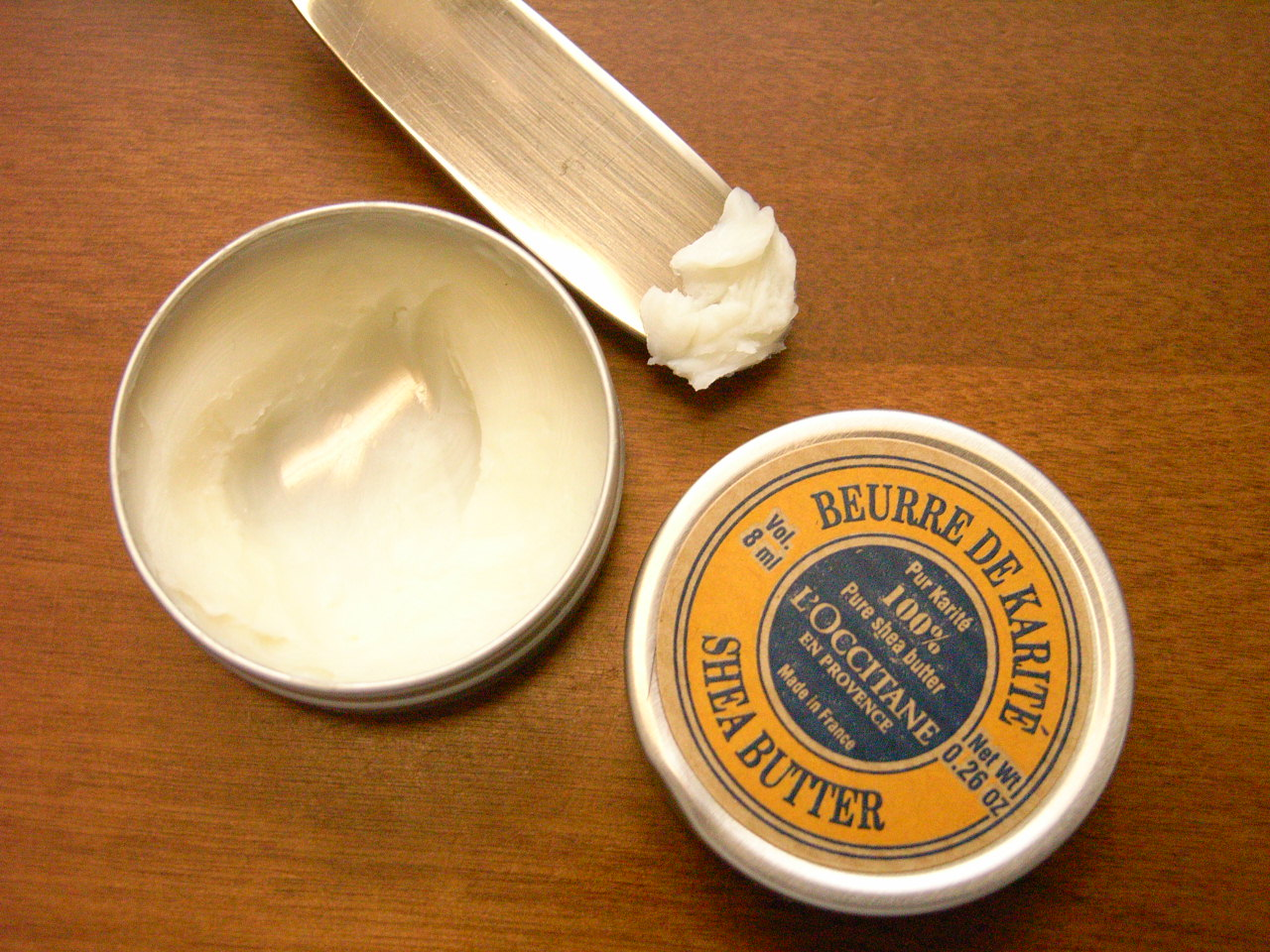
A tin of L'Occitane shea Butter

Since the 1980s, L’Occitane has sourced shea butter directly from women’s cooperatives in Burkina Faso. The company links this program to Fair Trade principles and ECOCERT certification, and it has been cited as contributing to income generation for local communities.

According to the company, it does not conduct animal testing and avoids animal-derived ingredients apart from beehive products. It states that many formulations follow the specifications of ECOCERT for organic cosmetics.

== The L'Occitane Foundation ==
La Fondation d'Entreprise L'Occitane is a private organisation founded in 2006 by the company, with a budget of €4 million over 6 years, to support visually impaired people and help the economic emancipation of women; it supports associations for the visually impaired, particularly in Burkina Faso with NGOs that are specialised in training professionals to reduce blindness. The L'Occitane Foundation has formed a partnership with Orbis, an organisation that fights against avoidable blindness in developing countries. To support economic emancipation of women, the L'Occitane Foundation partnered with the association Faa-I-tuora to improve the way of living of people in Dissin, in the South West region of Burkina Faso.

In 2013, the United Nations Development Programme (UNDP) decided to recognise L'Occitane en Provence as an exemplary company within the framework of its 2013 "Growing Inclusive Markets" initiative. Since 2013, L'Occitane Foundation has rewarded an ophthalmologist every two years for his work in the fight against blindness. In 2013 Professor Volker Klaus received the first l'Occitane Sight Award with a €50,000 grant for his action in Africa.
