= Galeries Modernes =

Dutch department store chain

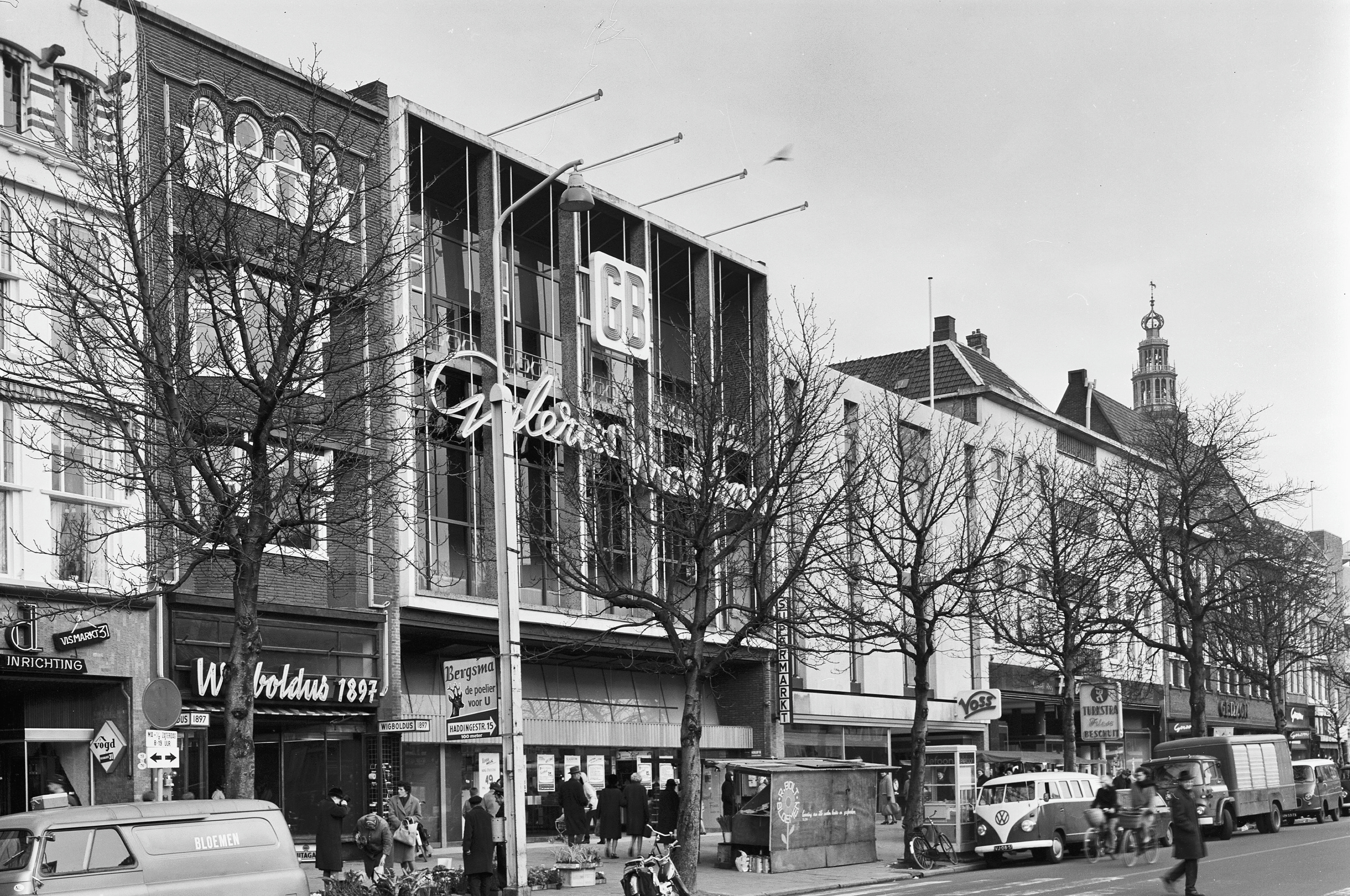
Galeries Modernes store on the Vismarkt in Groningen, 1967

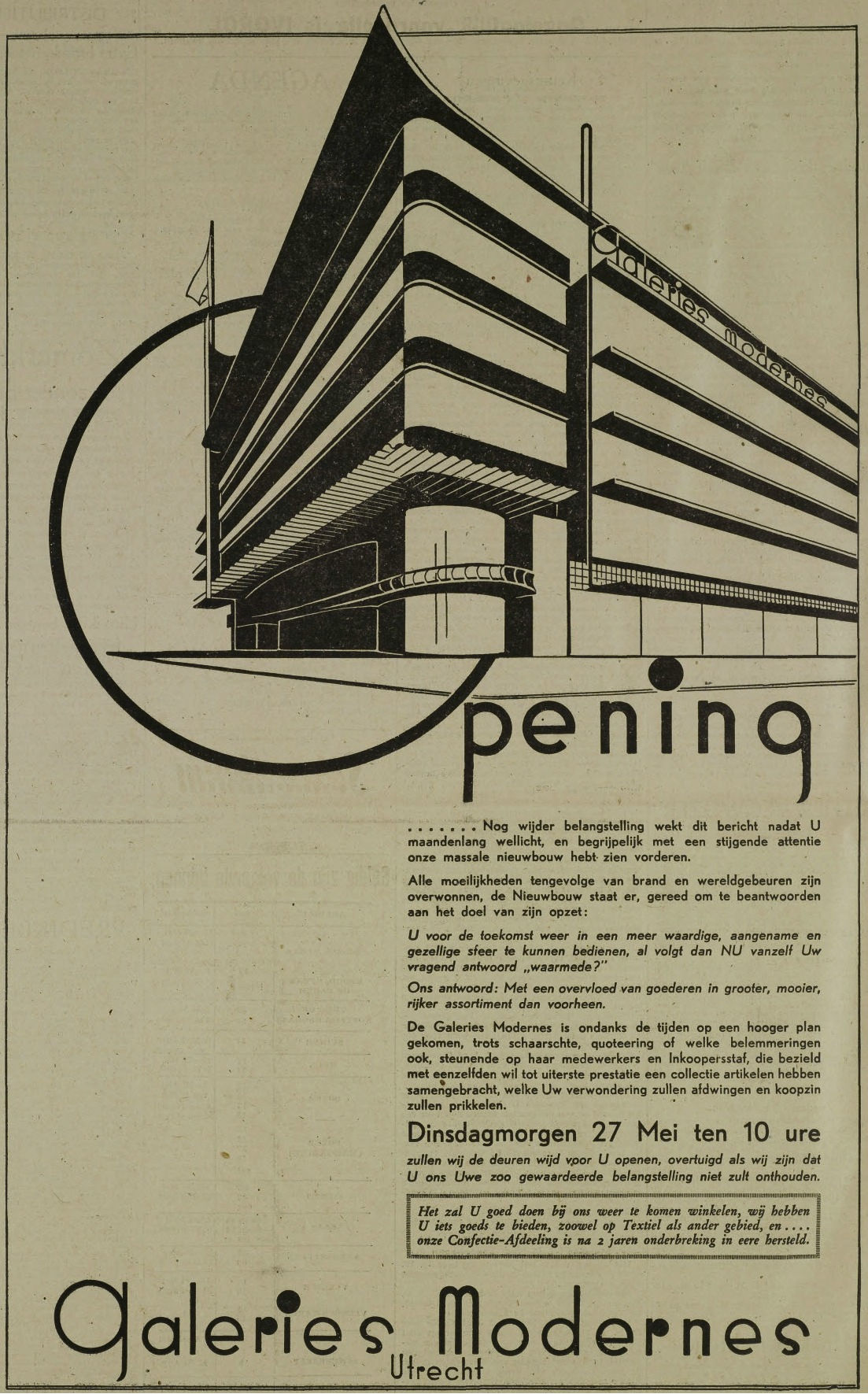
Newspaper ad for the relocated Utrecht store

Galeries Modernes was a department store chain in the Netherlands in the 20th century, with roots in the earlier company Grand Bazar Français. The last branches were closed in 1984.

== History ==
The history of the Galeries Modernes chain goes back to 1871, when the French merchant Zephyrin Couvreur opened his first Grand Bazar Français on the Hoogstraat in Rotterdam. Five years later, in 1876, a brother of Zephyrin opened a branch on Reguliersbreestraat in Amsterdam. By purchasing adjacent plots of land, the store could be expanded further. In the early 1930s it was decided to demolish the buildings and build a new building. A branch in Utrecht followed in 1901.

In 1921, the Couvreur family decided to merge the previously separate companies in Amsterdam, Rotterdam and Utrecht and establish a public limited company. In 1925 the name was changed to Galeries Modernes.

In 1960, the S.A. Le Grand Bazar d'Anvers (GB Group) and the N.V. Company for the Exploitation of Shops and Warehouses 'Galeries Modernes Grand Bazar Français' founded the new N.V. Galeries Modernes-Nederland. In the decades preceding this, both companies already maintained friendly ties with each other.

In October 1968, the chain was taken over by Koninklijke Bijenkorf Beheer (the parent company of De Bijenkorf department stores) through the acquisition of the shares of the Belgian GB Group. In addition, the remaining shares, which were held by a number of Belgian institutional investors, were acquired. As a result, KBB became full owner.

At the time of the takeover, Galeries Modernes was doing poorly, but through the takeover KBB tried to prevent the chain from falling into American or German hands. In the Netherlands there were still branches in The Hague, Rotterdam, Groningen, Arnhem and Utrecht. A reorganization plan was drawn up, in which the activities of Galeries Modernes were reduced and taken over by Maxis and De Bijenkorf.

In 1970, the Rotterdam-Hoogstraat, Gorinchem and Enkhuizen branches closed. Groningen followed in 1973 and the Arnhem branch was converted into a Bijenkorf. The last branch closed in mid-1984.

== Former branches (alphabetical) ==
In addition to the branches below, the Galeries Modernes had a logistics center of 12,500 m^{2} on the Hageweg in Vianen, which was opened in October 1962.

=== Amsterdam ===
In Amsterdam, a branch was opened on Reguliersbreestraat in 1876 by a brother of Zephyrin Couvreur. After its closure in 1970, this branch was transformed into a HEMA in early 1971, because the existing HEMA branch on Kalverstraat was too small.

=== Arnhem ===
In 1960, the Galeries Modernes Nederland, the Grand Bazar d'Anvers S.A. and the N.V. Manufacturenhandel Bunker from Arnhem to establish the N.V. Galeries Modernes Arnhem, with the input of the Bunker companies. The staff was taken over. The branch was opened in 1961 and existed on Ketelstraat until 1974. This branch was subsequently converted into a branch of De Bijenkorf.

=== The Hague ===
This branch was located at Vlamingstraat 32.

=== Enkhuizen ===
This branch opened in 1923 and closed in 1979.

=== Gorinchem ===
In 1923 a branch was opened in Gorinchem of the French Bazar. In 1934, the branch in Gorinchem was renovated and the name changed to Galeries Modernes. This branch at Langendijk 82 was closed in 1970.

=== Groningen ===
Grand Bazar Français, or the French Bazar, was the first department store in the city of Groningen in 1904. It was established by Couvreur & Tanchette at Vismarkt 27, after it was first established in a smaller form at Herestraat E 30 from 1898 onwards. After the bankruptcy of the Grand Bazar in 1934, the T.A.N.T.E. department store was established here in November 1936. opened; the CV Second General Dutch Exhibition rented the building from the Grand Bazar Français Nouvelles Galeries. The building went up in flames in May 1939. Partly due to the Second World War, a new building of Galeries Modernes by architect Frans Klein was not built on the same site until 1954. In the wave of reorganization that followed after the takeover by Bijenkorf, it was decided to close the Groningen branch. The curtain finally fell in 1974. The Groningen Public Library was located in the building from 1975 to 1992.

=== Leiden ===
In Leiden there was a branch at Vischmarkt 4.

=== Rijswijk ===
In Rijswijk there was a branch in the In de Bogaard shopping center.[10] After the closure, this branch was converted into a Maxis supermarket branch.

=== Rotterdam-Hoogstraat ===
On November 8, 1956, a branch of the Galeries Modernes was opened on Hoogstraat in a building designed by the architectural firm Van den Broek en Bakema. It was a rectangular building measuring 30 by 50 meters, consisting of 3 floors with sales space and a floor with offices and warehouse. The sales floor area was approximately 2,300 m^{2}. Although the building had largely closed facades, a strip of glass was provided at the top of the floors through which daylight entered. The branch closed its doors in 1970.

=== Rotterdam-Hoogvliet ===
In Hoogvliet there has been a branch on the Binnenban since September 12, 1962. In 1981 it was announced that the branch would be expanded to 2,500 m^{2} and a restaurant of 500 m^{2}. On March 24, 1983, this branch was renamed Maxis and Galeries Modernes ceased to exist.

=== Rotterdam-Statenweg ===
On October 29, 1940, a branch was opened on the corner of Statenweg and Walenburgerweg in Rotterdam. It was a store with an area of about 600 m^{2} spread over two floors. The design by the architect Brouwer resulted in a light, modern and well-organized store. In 1957 the building was demolished because it was no longer useful after the Galeries Modernes had moved into its new building on Hoogstraat. The 'Statenflat' now stands at this location.

=== Utrecht ===
From 1901 onwards there was a department store in Utrecht in the Bakkerstraat^{[nl]}. The owner, the Belgian businessman Georges Couvreur, made sure that the public was welcome without any obligation to make purchases. Three years later, due to its success, it was possible to move to more spacious accommodation on the corner of Lange Viestraat^{[nl]} and Oudegracht^{[nl]}. In 1925 an expansion took place with a textile department. In addition, the name was changed from Grand Bazar Français to Galeries Modernes with the aim of attracting more buyers. In 1939, a fire broke out and destroyed the department store.

After the fire, the Galeries Modernes was housed in emergency accommodation on the Neude^{[nl]}. In 1941, the department store reopened on the site of the burned down department store. There she was given access to a new and larger building designed by the architect Dick Brouwer^{[nl]} who made the design in 1938 in functionalist style with large glass areas and horizontal lines. This Galeries Modernes closed in 1981, and a year later a branch of the department store Kwantum^{[nl]} opened. Ten years later, Kwantum Hallen moved to Nieuw Amsterdamlaan 12 in Utrecht. In 1991, the building on the corner of Lange Viestraat and Oudegracht was converted into the Blue Building shopping center, with blue facade panels. Later it was called De Planete Shopping Center. In 2012, De Planet was purchased by Syntrus Achmea, which announced in 2013 that it would restore the building to its former glory.

== Trivia ==
Popularly, the name 'Galeries Modernes' was shortened to "The GalMod".
