= Stadshart Amstelveen =

Shopping center in Amsterdam, Netherlands

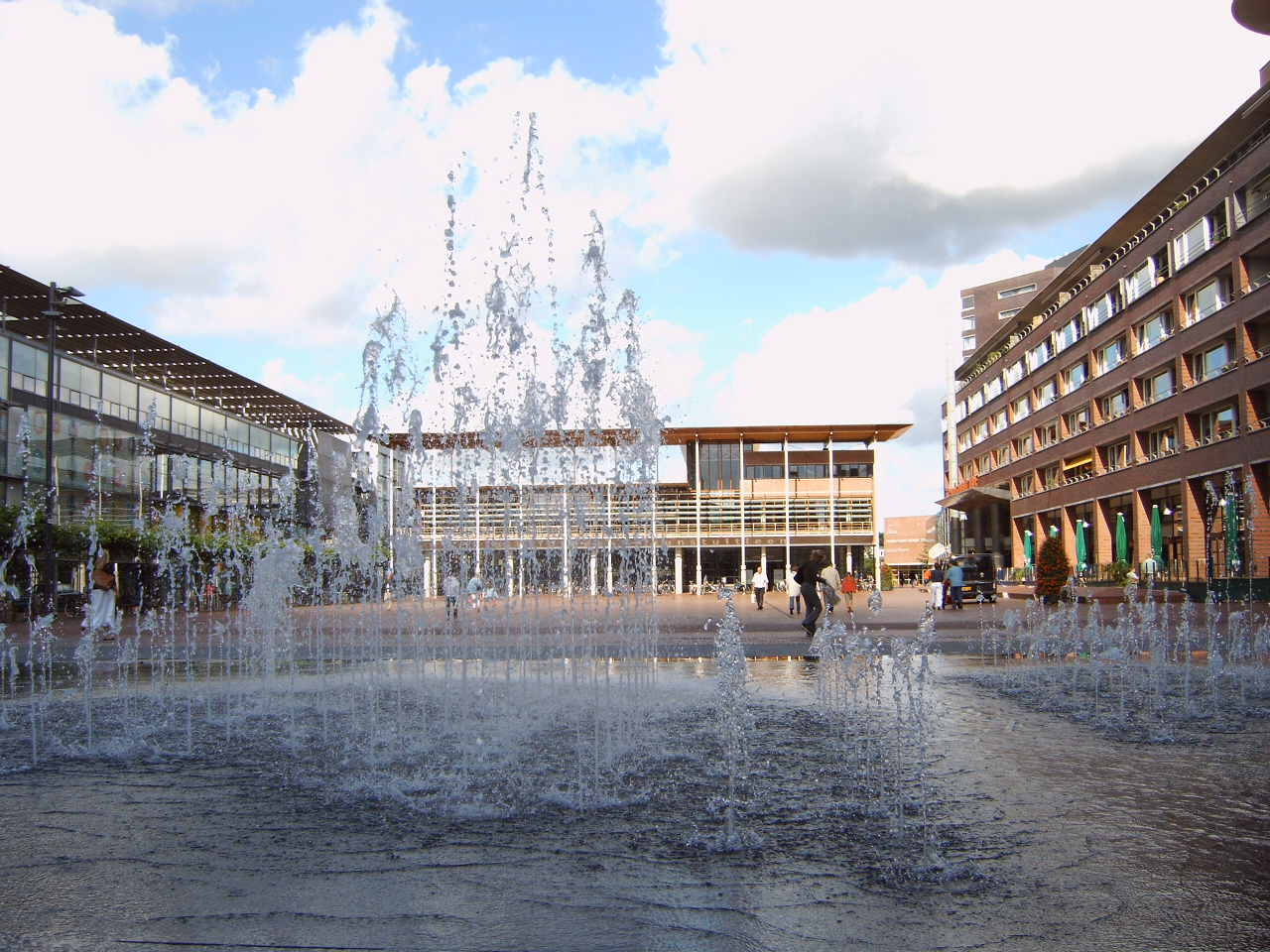

Stadshart Amstelveen is a shopping center that forms the city center of Amstelveen, a suburb of Amsterdam. The shopping center was built around the previous, smaller Binnenhof shopping center and the former 1960 Square, today Stadsplein ("city square"), and was redesignated with its present name in 1998. The center is home to about 230 shops including a branch of the upscale department store De Bijenkorf, of which there are only 7 branches in all of The Netherlands. The southern part of Rembrandtweg street and the Stadstuinen ("city gardens") are also part of it. Since 2019, Stadshart Amstelveen also has a mascot, named Sammie Het Zwijntje, "Sammie the Pig", named after the well-known boar statue at HEMA.

== Cultural facilities ==
The Amstelveen Central Library is located here together with the art lending library. Cobra Museum is here as is a pop music theater P60, a theater, a music school and a Volksuniversiteit (analogous to a community college in the U.S.).
