= Brico =

Belgian hardware store chain

- Type: Public
- Industry: Retail
- Founded: 1973; 53 years ago in Schoten, Belgium
- Headquarters: Groot-Bijgaarden, Belgium
- Area served: Belgium; Luxembourg
- Products: DIY, garden-related
- Parent: Until 2002: GIB Group; Since 2002: Maxeda
- Website: www.brico.be

Brico is a Belgian hardware store chain. The chain focuses mainly on DIY items but also sells garden-related articles. The chain has 140 locations (as of February 2016) spread over Belgium, about 95 of which are franchised.

== History ==
The first store opened in 1973 in Schoten. The name Brico comes from the French bricoler, which means to do DIY. During the 1980s, Brico produced two brands of its own, namely Stop and Bricobi. Currently, these brands are known as Central Park and Sencys. Until 2002, Brico was part of the GIB Group, which was sold to the Dutch Vendex (currently Maxeda). Maxeda also owns the Hardware store chains Praxis and Formido.

Former locations of Leroy Merlin in Belgium have become part of Brico NV and have been reformed and renamed Plan-It. These stores focus mainly on larger DIY and decoration projects.

In 2006, the first Brico City shops were opened. These are smaller stores in the city centers (Antwerp, Brussels, Liege, Ghent ) that focus on the most basic and easy-to-store items.

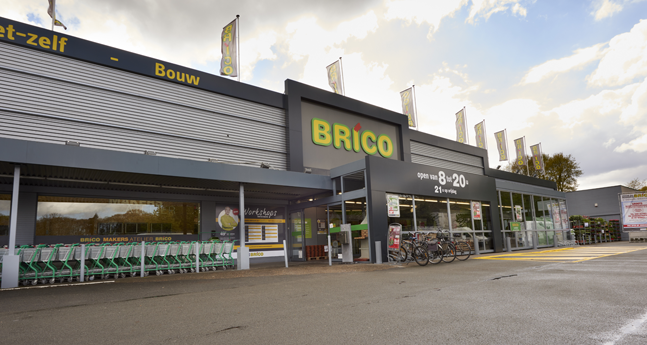
Brico in Sint-Denijs-Westrem

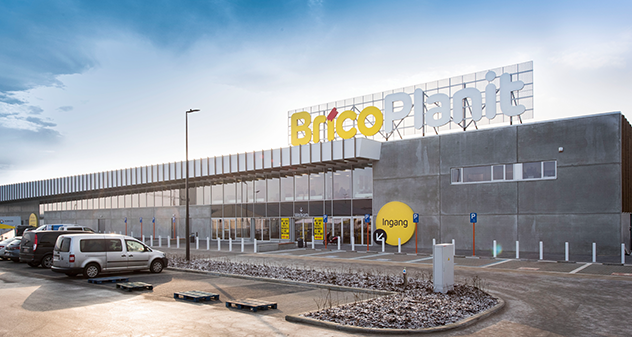
BricoPlanit in Ternat

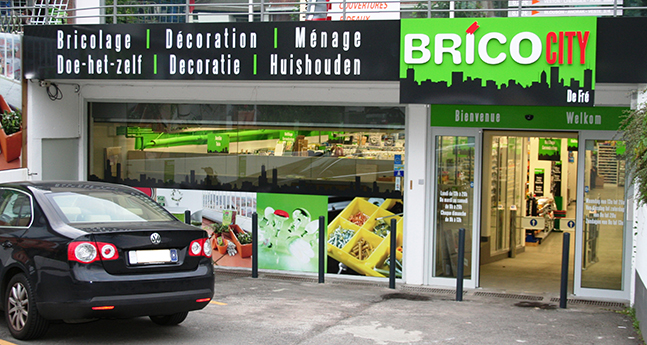
BricoCity in Ukkel

In January 2024, Brico's parent company Maxeda engaged the investment bank Rothschild to sell its 138 Brico and 14 BricoPlanit stores in Belgium. Of the 138 Brico stores, 81 were run by franchisees, and the rest, including all 14 BricoPlanit stores, were operated directly by Maxeda. Brico's chief executive stated that the stores were for sale but that no buyer had yet been found.

In December 2025, Maxeda announced plans to transfer ten Benelux stores to independent operators, four in Belgium, four in the Netherlands and two in Luxembourg. According to a trade union representative, Brico planned to convert ten Belgian stores to franchises by summer 2026 with the first four by February 2026. The stores affected included standard Brico stores as well as BricoCity and BricoPlanit outlets.

In February 2026, Maxeda DIY Group reached an agreement with its creditors under which they wrote off part of their claims in exchange for a minority stake, while shareholder GoldenTree contributed new capital. The recapitalization was completed on 24 March 2026. In October 2026, trade press reported that Maxeda had ended its most recent fiscal year with a loss.

== Sponsoring ==
Throughout the 1990s, the chain played a significant role as a co-sponsor of the Mapei cycling team through the brand Bricobi. This collaboration not only showcased the chain's commitment to sports and teamwork but also solidified its presence within the competitive world of cycling.

== Online store ==
In 2006, Brico responded to the changing landscape of retail by introducing its own webshop. This move allowed customers to access Brico's products and services through an online platform, conveniently integrated into the existing Brico website.
