= Formido =

Formido may refer to:

- Formido (Deimos (deity)), the personification of terror in Roman and Greek mythology
- Formido (game), a video game released by MHGames under the terms of the GNU General Public License (GPL)
- Formido (store), a Dutch Hardware store-chain
