= MS Mode =

Dutch fashion retailer

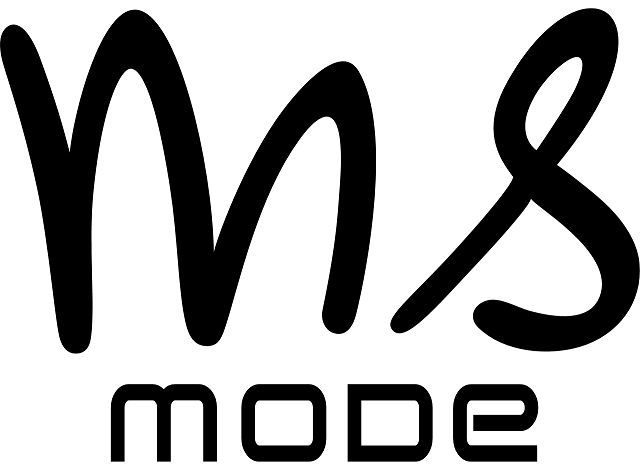
- Type: Private limited company
- Industry: Retail
- Founded: Diemen, Netherlands (1964)
- Founder: Max Abram
- Headquarters: Diemen, Netherlands
- Number of locations: 430 stores (2014)
- Area served: Western Europe
- Number of employees: ~5000 (2010)

MS Mode is a Dutch fashion retailer operating over 200 stores in the Netherlands, France, Belgium, Spain, and Luxembourg, founded by Max Abram. The business originates from the Amsterdamse Albert Cuypmarkt but the first real store started off in 1964, in Rotterdam as Mantel Specialist only selling ladies' coats but later selling clothing for women of all ages. MS Mode sells all sizes in the range of sizes 38-54 at the same price.

MS Mode was formerly called M&S, but this caused confusion with British department store Marks & Spencer, which also uses 'M&S' as an abbreviation.

The company was formerly owned by Maxeda which also owned the Vroom & Dreesmann and Bijenkorf department stores. Since 2010, MS Mode is part of Roland Kahn's Excellent Retail Brands, together with Coolcat, America Today and Sapph.
