= De Bijenkorf =

Chain of department stores in the Netherlands

- Type: Private
- Industry: Retail
- Genre: Department stores
- Founded: 1870; 156 years ago
- Headquarters: Amsterdam, Netherlands
- Products: Clothing, footwear, bedding, furniture, jewelry, beauty products, house wares
- Parent: Selfridges Group
- Website: www.debijenkorf.nl

De Bijenkorf (Dutch pronunciation: [də ˈbɛi.ə(ŋ)kɔr(ə)f]; literally, "the beehive") is a chain of high-end department stores in the Netherlands, with its flagship store on Dam Square in Amsterdam. The chain is owned by Selfridges Group, owner also of Britain's Selfridges and Ireland's Brown Thomas and Arnotts.

It was a member of the International Association of Department Stores from 1929 to 2012, with various CEOs acting as president of the Association.

== History ==
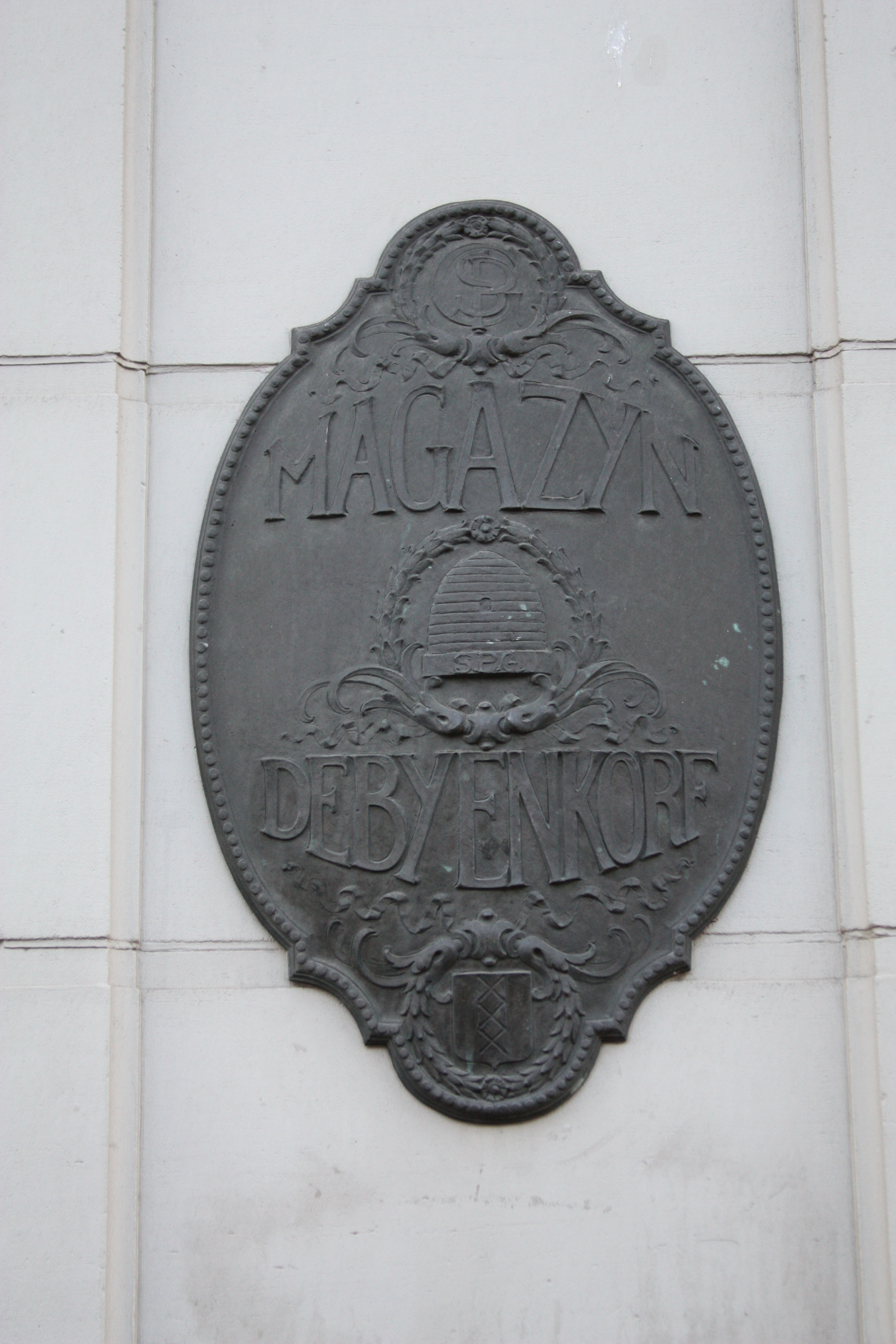

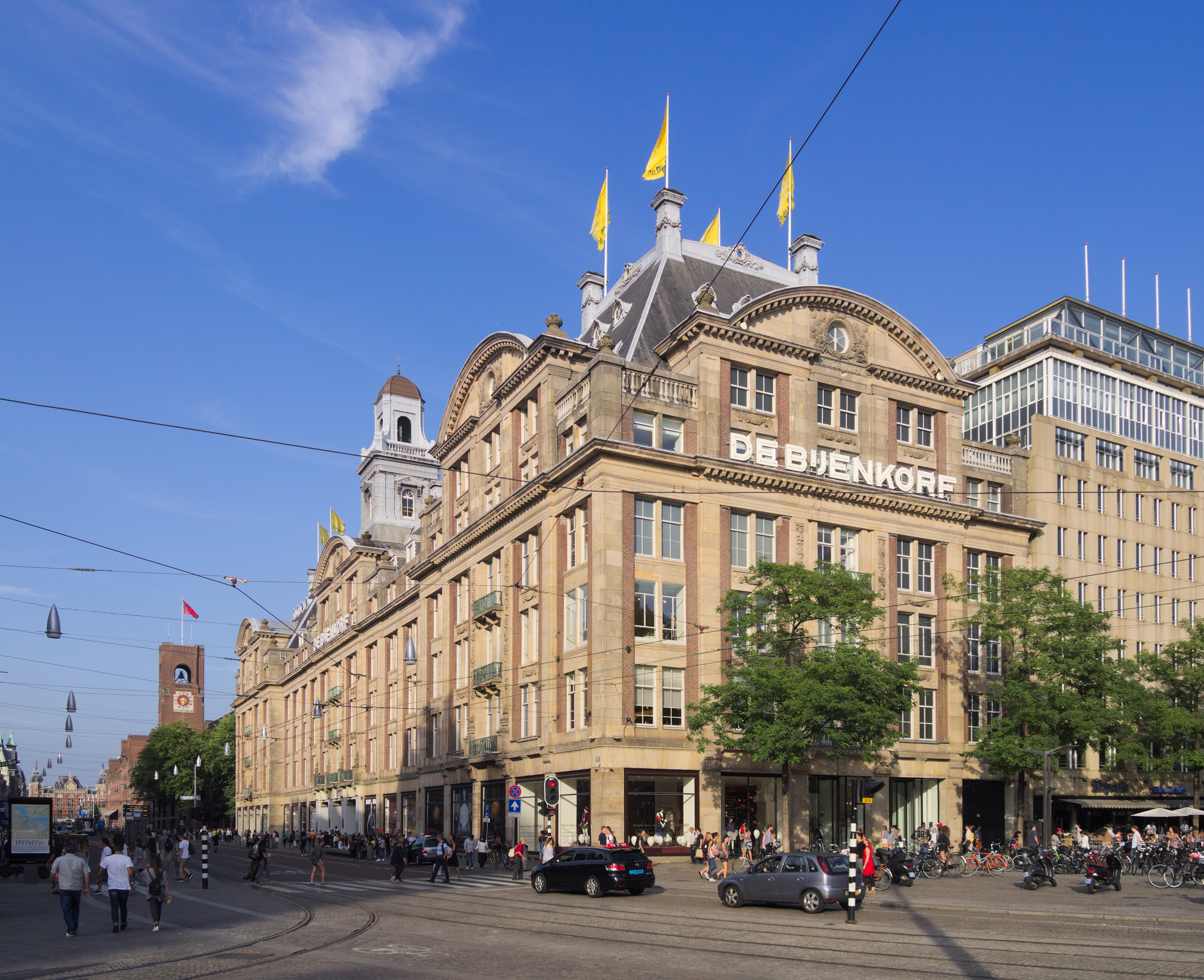
Flagship on Dam Square in Amsterdam

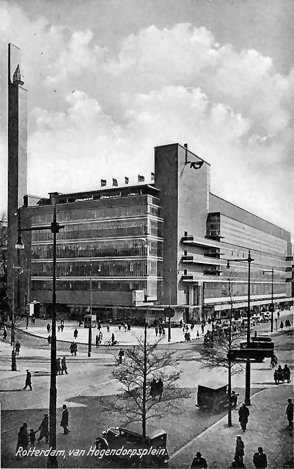
Rotterdam, 1930–1940

De Bijenkorf was founded in 1870 by Simon Philip Goudsmit (1845–1889), starting as a small haberdashery shop at 132 Nieuwendijk, one of Amsterdam's oldest streets and to this day a main shopping street. Initially limited to yarn and ribbons, and employing a staff of four, the stock expanded gradually. After the death of Goudsmit in 1889, Goudsmit's widow expanded the business with the help of a cousin, Arthur Isaac, and her son Alfred, eventually buying adjacent buildings.

In 1909, these connecting shops were replaced by a new building. That same year, a temporary building was erected on the site of the demolished Beurs van Zocher, and construction of a new store started beside it.

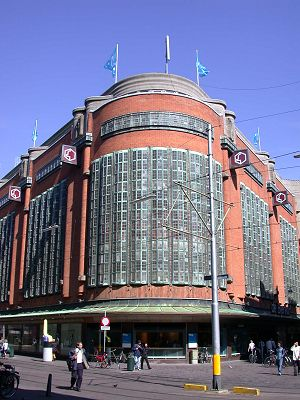
The Hague

In 1926, a second store was built in The Hague: a notable example of Amsterdam School architecture designed by Piet Kramer.

A third store opened in Rotterdam in 1930, designed by renowned architect Willem Dudok. Some 700,000 people attended the opening festivities.

=== Toll of German occupation ===
The Rotterdam store was heavily damaged in the German bombing of Rotterdam of 1940 after Nazi Germany invaded (and preceded the occupation of the country 1940–1945), which ended in the near-total destruction of the city's historic centre. The intact part of the store remained open for business until 1957, but was cleared in 1960 to build the Rotterdam Metro. A new store was designed by Hungarian-American architect Marcel Breuer (1902–1981).

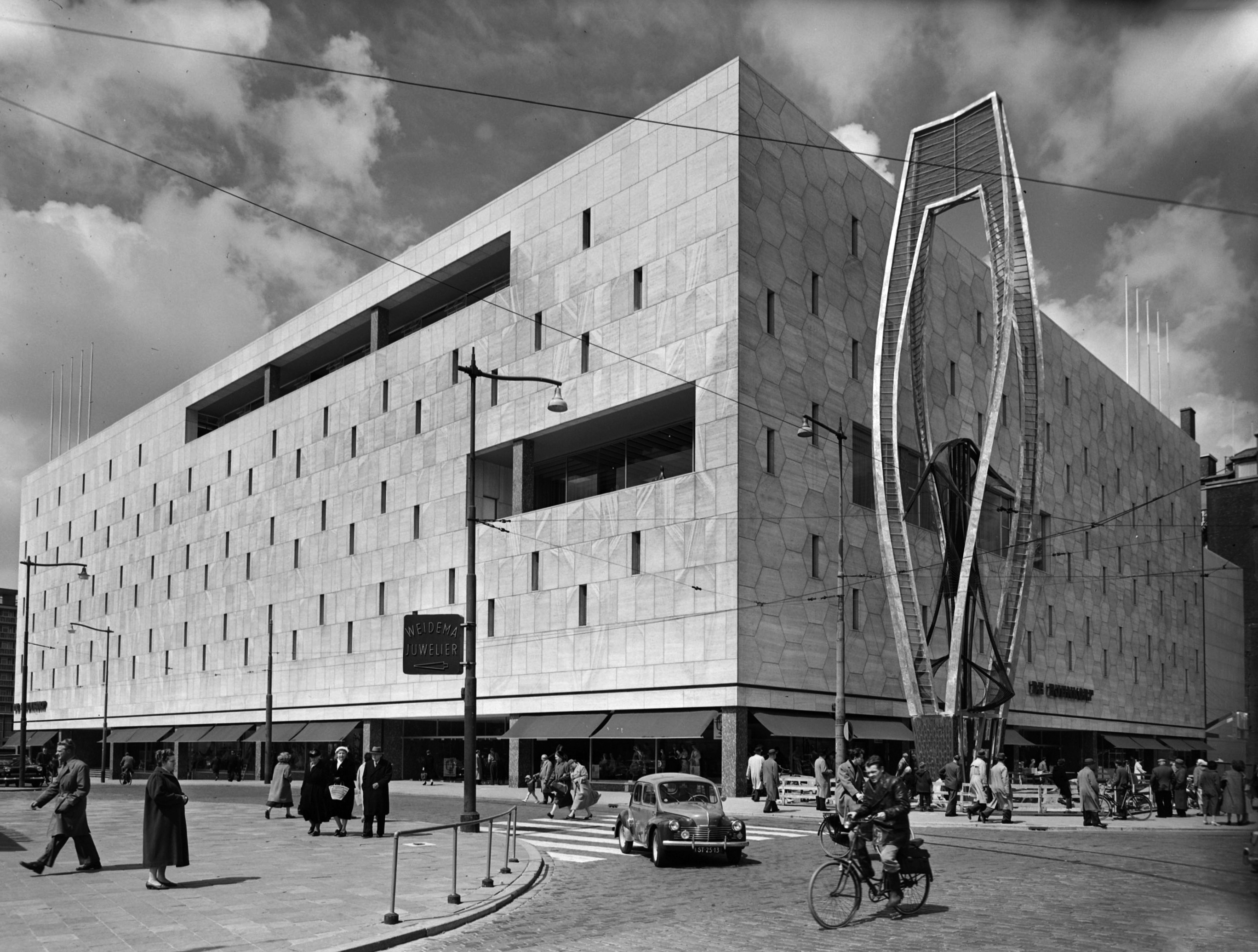
1957 new building Bijenkorf store in Rotterdam designed by Marcel Breuer in cooperation with Abraham Elzas. On the right a sculpture by Naum Gabo

After the invasion, the authorities confiscated the shares of the Jewish owners and German company Riensch & Held took them over. In November 1943, German businessman Herbert Tengelmann was placed on the Board as Wehrwirtschaftsführer. Of the 5000 employees in May 1940 around 1000 were of Jewish origin and of those 737 were murdered by the Nazis. The owners Isaac and Alfred Goudsmit escaped to the United States. The Jewish Dutch owners were able to reclaim their property after the liberation of 1945.

=== Post-war ===
==== Ownership of De Bijenkorf ====
| Year | Group | | | Remarks |
| Year | Part of | Owner | | Remarks |
| Year | Part of | Company | Nationality | Remarks |
|---|---|---|---|---|
| 1966 | Koninklijke Bijenkorf Beheer (KBB)^{(nl)} | | Dutch | |
| 1999 | Vendex KBB NV | | Dutch | Merger of KBB and Vroom en Dreesman; also owned HEMA. |
| 2004 | Vendex KBB NV | VDXK Acquisition BV, in turn owned by KKR, AlpInvest Partners, and Change Capital Partners | American, Dutch | Maxeda paid EUR 2.4 billion for Vendex KBB, took it off the stock exchange and in 2006 merged it into Maxeda, selling HEMA for 1.3 bn euro to Lion Capital and retiring the Vendex KBB name. Maxeda was owned by Kohlberg Kravis Roberts (KKR) & Co. (USA) and AlpInvest Partners (Netherlands). It owned V&D, La Place, De Bijenkorf, Hunkemöller, and MS Mode (then called M&S Mode), which is sold for a total of EUR 4 billion. |
| 2004 | Koninklijke Vendex KBB BV | VDXK Acquisition BV, in turn owned by KKR, AlpInvest Partners, and Change Capital Partners | American, Dutch | Maxeda paid EUR 2.4 billion for Vendex KBB, took it off the stock exchange and in 2006 merged it into Maxeda, selling HEMA for 1.3 bn euro to Lion Capital and retiring the Vendex KBB name. Maxeda was owned by Kohlberg Kravis Roberts (KKR) & Co. (USA) and AlpInvest Partners (Netherlands). It owned V&D, La Place, De Bijenkorf, Hunkemöller, and MS Mode (then called M&S Mode), which is sold for a total of EUR 4 billion. |
| 2004 | Vendex KBB BV | VDXK Acquisition BV, in turn owned by KKR, AlpInvest Partners, and Change Capital Partners | American, Dutch | Maxeda paid EUR 2.4 billion for Vendex KBB, took it off the stock exchange and in 2006 merged it into Maxeda, selling HEMA for 1.3 bn euro to Lion Capital and retiring the Vendex KBB name. Maxeda was owned by Kohlberg Kravis Roberts (KKR) & Co. (USA) and AlpInvest Partners (Netherlands). It owned V&D, La Place, De Bijenkorf, Hunkemöller, and MS Mode (then called M&S Mode), which is sold for a total of EUR 4 billion. |
| 2006 | Maxeda | VDXK Acquisition BV, in turn owned by KKR, AlpInvest Partners, and Change Capital Partners | American, Dutch | Maxeda paid EUR 2.4 billion for Vendex KBB, took it off the stock exchange and in 2006 merged it into Maxeda, selling HEMA for 1.3 bn euro to Lion Capital and retiring the Vendex KBB name. Maxeda was owned by Kohlberg Kravis Roberts (KKR) & Co. (USA) and AlpInvest Partners (Netherlands). It owned V&D, La Place, De Bijenkorf, Hunkemöller, and MS Mode (then called M&S Mode), which is sold for a total of EUR 4 billion. |
| 2011 | Selfridges Group Ltd. | | British | Also owned Selfridges (UK), Brown Thomas and Arnott's (Ireland) Holt Renfrew and Ogilvy (Canada) |
| 2022 | Selfridges Group Ltd. | Central Group/Signa Holding | Thai, Austrian | Also acquired Selfridge's (4 stores), Brown Thomas (6 stores), and Arnott's. Already owned KaDeWe (Germany–Berlin), Globus (Switzerland) and La Rinascente (Italy). |

== Stores ==
As of 2014, De Bijenkorf has 7 stores nationwide. The oldest and largest branches, situated in Amsterdam, The Hague and Rotterdam, have retail space ranging between 15,000 and 21,000 square meters. Smaller stores (7,500–10,000 m^{2} of retail space) can be found in Amstelveen, Eindhoven, Utrecht and Maastricht.

Branches in Arnhem, Groningen, Enschede, Breda and Den Bosch closed in late 2014/early 2015 as the parent group decided to focus up-market and online due to the new premium service strategy. The Arnhem building was taken over by Primark, a move seen by many Arnhemers as drastically reducing the attractiveness of Arnhem as a shopping centre.

Bijenkorf Wonen was a store format that carried home furnishings such as bath and bed linens, housewares, kitchen appliances, dishware, glassware, decorative accessories, et al.

=== Table of store locations ===
De Bijenkorf stores currently operating
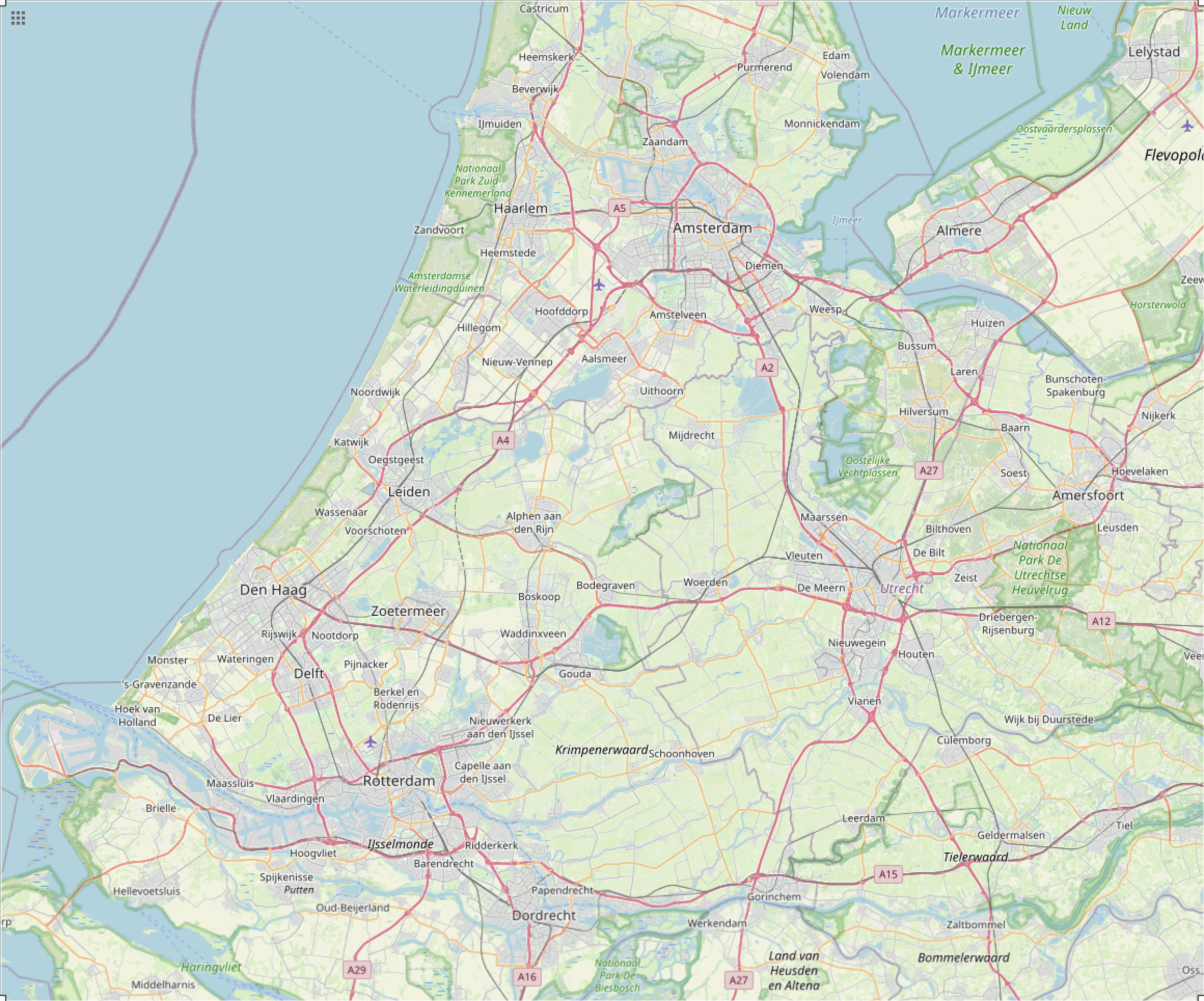
De Bijenkorf stores currently operating

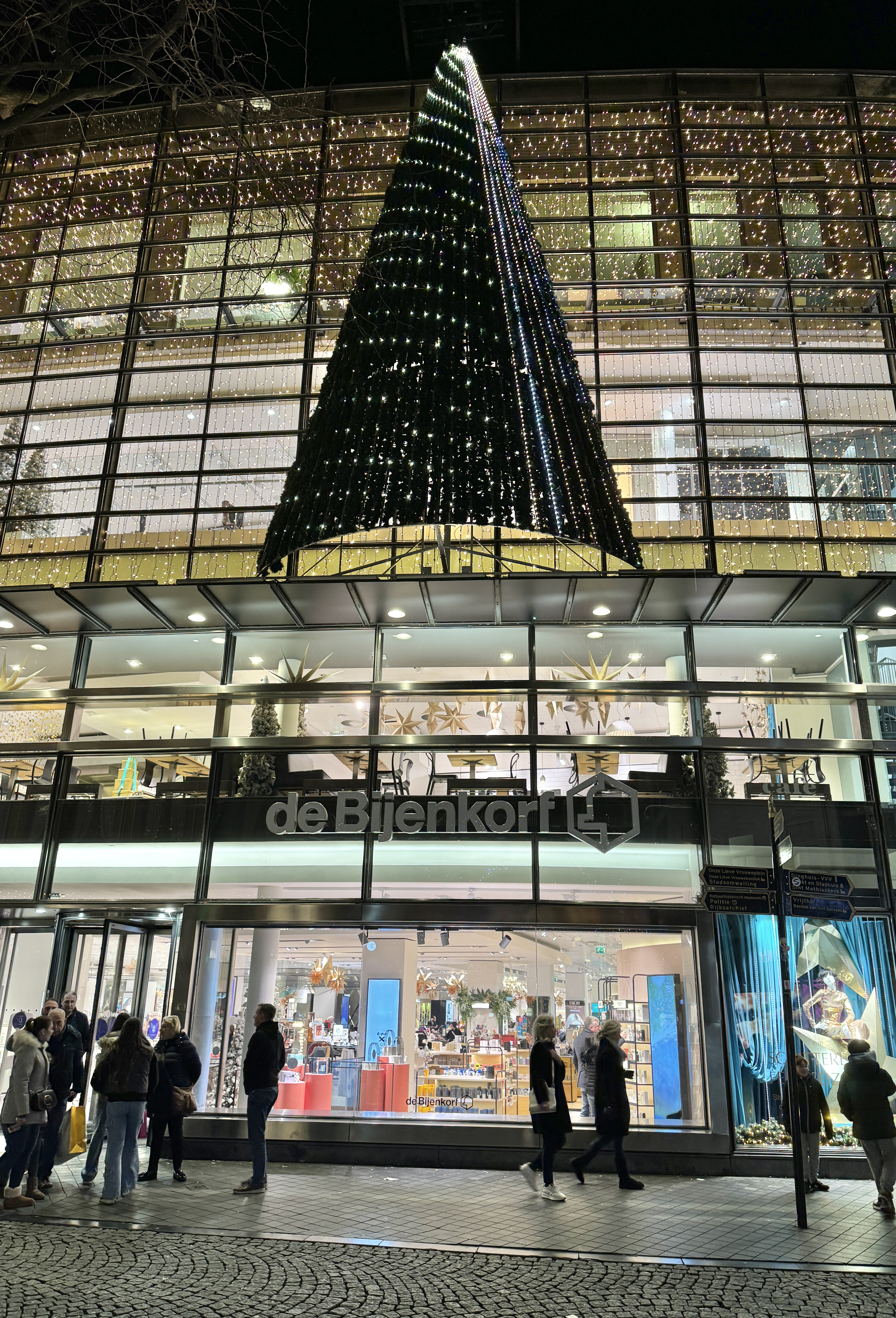
Maastricht, Christmastime, Dec 2023

| City | Street or mall | Format | Opened | Closed | Current tenant |
|---|---|---|---|---|---|
| Amsterdam | Dam | Full-line | 1870 | in operation | |
| The Hague | Wagenstraat | Full-line | 1926 | in operation | |
| Rotterdam (1930–1957) | Van Hoogendorpplein (now Churchillplein) | Full-line | October 16, 1930 | March 13, 1957 | |
| Rotterdam (1957–present) | Coolsingel | Full-line | 1957 | in operation | |
| Eindhoven | Piazza Center | Full-line | 1969 | in operation | |
| Utrecht | | Full-line | 1977/87 | in operation | |
| Amstelveen | Stadshart Amstelveen | Full-line | 1998 | in operation | |
| Maastricht | | Full-line | 2003 | in operation | |
| Arnhem | Ketelstraat | Full-line | 1975 | 2013 | Primark |
| Enschede | | Full-line | 2002 | 2013 | Primark |
| Breda | | Apparel | 2001 | 2016 | Zara |
| Groningen | | Apparel | 2001 | 2016 | Zara |
| Den Bosch | | Apparel | 2001 | 2016 | The Sting Companies |
| Arnhem | | Wonen | 1970s | 1980s | |
| Utrecht | | Wonen | 1977 | 1987 | |
| Haarlem | | Wonen | 1986 | closed | |
| Venlo | | Outlet | 2005 | 2008 | |
| Lelystad | Batavia Stad | Outlet | before 2006 | closed | |
