= GIB Group =

Company from Belgium

- Industry: Retail
- Founded: 1860
- Founder: Baron Vaxelaire
- Successor: Carrefour
- Headquarters: Belgium
- Products: Hardware stores, DIY stores, Supermarkets, Hypermarkets, Convenience stores, Retail, Fast-food
- Website: carrefour.eu

GIB Group (Grand Bazar Innovation Bon Marché) was a Belgian conglomerate, consisting of various retail and restaurant chains that existed until 2002. GIB Group owned GB (Grand Bazar) super/hypermarkets, Brico (home improvement/DIY), Inno (department store), Quick restaurants (Belgium, France, Netherlands, Luxembourg), Lunch Garden self-service restaurants, Auto 5 car wash/service chain, Nopri, GIB Immo, Christiaensen and Unic.

== History ==
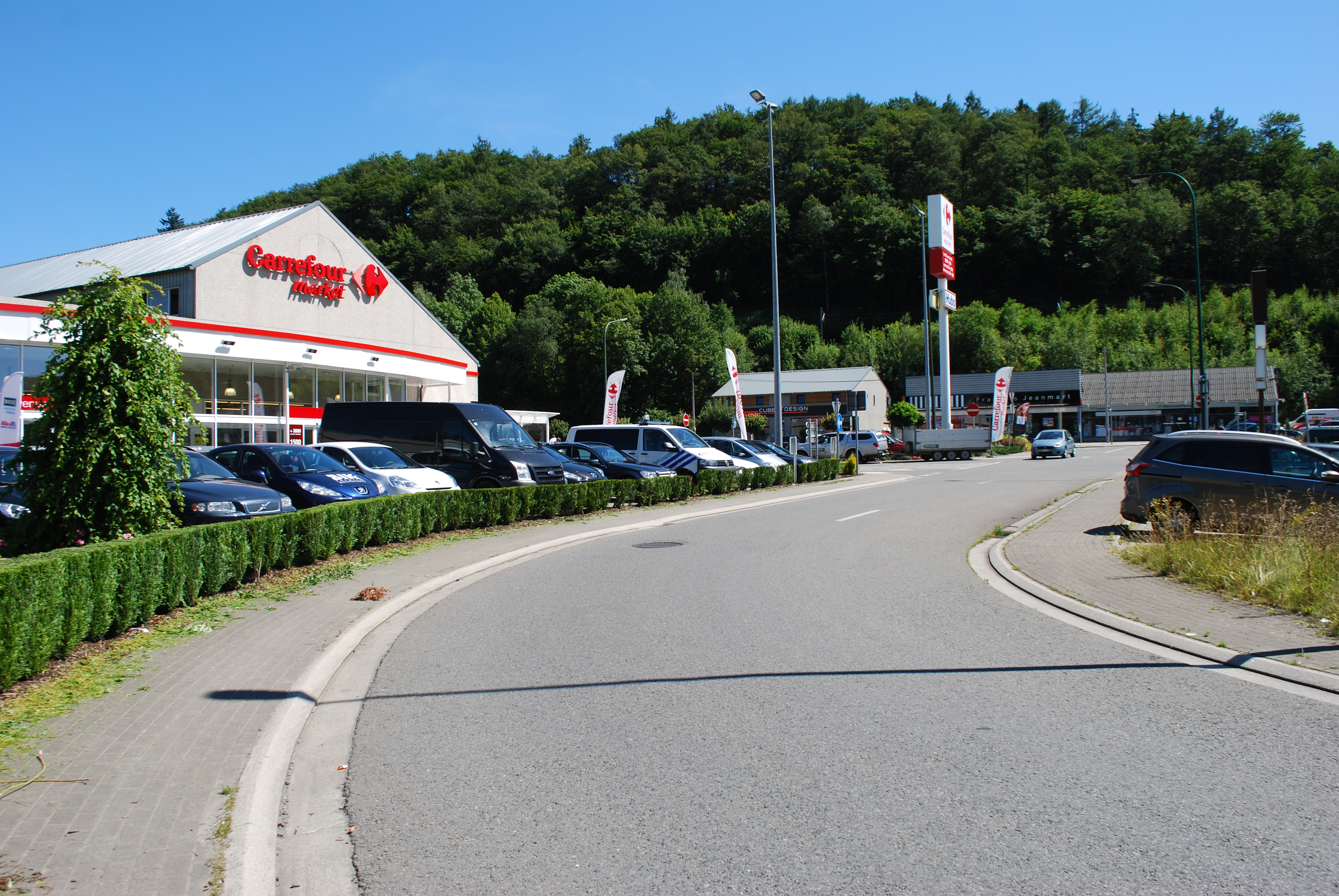
A Carrefour Market store in Aywaille, Belgium.

In 1860, the GIB Group is created by opening the first Au Bon Marché store in Brussels by François Vaxelaire.

In 1933, Nopri department stores were created.

In 1958, the first Super GB supermarket is opened.

In 1960, Baron François Vaxelaire (grandson of namesake) takes over the family business from his father, Raymond Vaxelaire.

In 1961, the first GB hypermarkets are created under the name of Superbazar in Auderghem, Anderlecht and Bruges. The Superbazar stores all became Maxi GB in 1985.

In 1969–74, Baron François Vaxelaire engineers a fusion of GB, Innovation and BM as GIB (GB-Inno-BM). Inno was a previously independent Belgian department store chain that was taken over (it is currently owned by Galeria Kaufhof).

In 1979, GIB and British supermarket chain Sainsbury's founded a garden retailer that would later become Homebase.

In 1997, the first GB Express is opened in Berchem-Sainte-Agathe, in the same year, Super GB Partner and Contact GB are created.

In July 2000, Carrefour Group S.A. takes over the GIB Group, modernizes and rebrands all Maxi GB hypermarkets to Carrefour, the other stores staying under the GB brand, all those stores will also be renovated.

In 2002 Carrefour retires the GIB Group name of the holding subsidiary and sells the Brico chain to Vendex.

In 2007, Super GB, Super GB Partner and Contact GB supermarkets all become Carrefour GB, while GB Express convenience stores are renamed Carrefour Express.

Two years later, Carrefour GB stores in Belgium are rebranded as Carrefour Market, all GB stores will eventually be a Market store in Belgium in 2013/2014. In Wallonia and Brussels, the Champion supermarket chain has also been rebranded, as Carrefour Market-Groupe Mestdagh.

As of May 2013, there were still 58 GB branded supermarkets left, as well as 28 Champion stores. The rest (around 431 GB stores) have completed the transition to "Carrefour" brand.
