= Claudia Sträter =

Dutch women's fashion brand

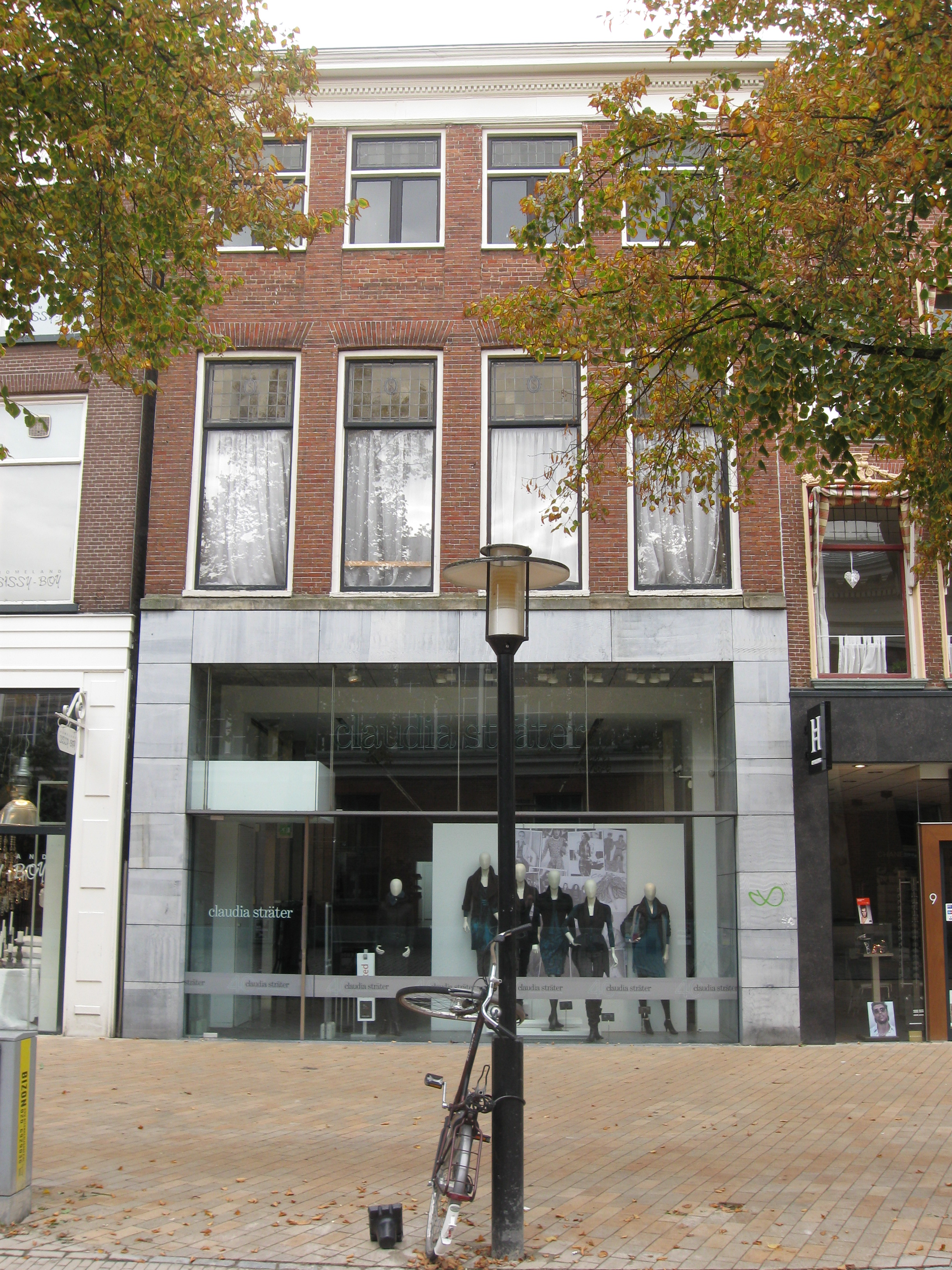
Claudia Sträter store in Groningen. Designed by architect Liesbeth van der Pol and registered Rijksmonument i.e. national heritage site.

Claudia Sträter is a Dutch women's fashion brand and retailer headquartered in Diemen near Amsterdam with stores in The Netherlands, Belgium and Luxembourg.

== History ==
Founded in 1970 as the merger of Claudia Mode (a trade name of Modehuizen Wigi) from Utrecht and Modehuis Sträter from the Kalverstraat in Amsterdam. Joop Witteveen was the first director.

In 1974 Claudia Sträter was made part of Vroom & Dreesmann. In 1978 the company was sold to Vendex, later Maxeda.

Designer Jan Taminiau designed a special collection for the label in 2007.

Claudia Sträter was from 2012 until 2020 a part of the Belgian company FNG NV. In 2013 international expansion began. In 2017 Claudia Sträter had 29 sortes of which 5 in Belgium and 1 in Luxembourg. In September 2020 Claudia Sträter shops were taken over by Martijn Rozenboom after the bankruptcy of FNG Nederland. Later that month the Claudia Sträter chain was sold to Van Uffelen Groep.

== Awards ==
Claudia Sträter was awarded the Dutch Grand Seigneur fashion award of 1998.
