= Quick (restaurant) =

Belgian chain of restaurants

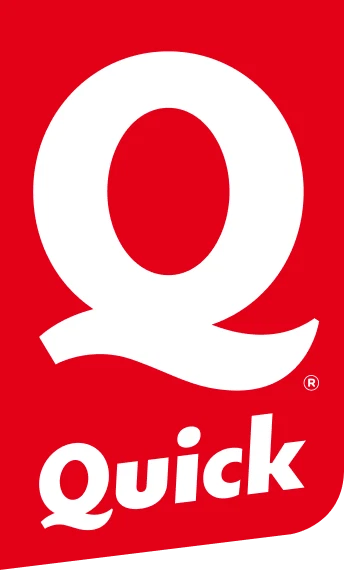
- Logo used since 2023 (Only in France)
- Founded: 1971; 55 years ago Schoten, Belgium
- Founder: Baron François Vaxelaire
- Headquarters: Brussels, Belgium
- Area served: Belgium; France; Luxembourg; Morocco; Tunisia
- Parent: HIG Capital (France); QSR Belgium (Belgium and Luxembourg)
- Website: www.quick.be www.quick.fr www.quick.ma www.quick.lu www.quick.tn

Quick Restaurants' previous logo

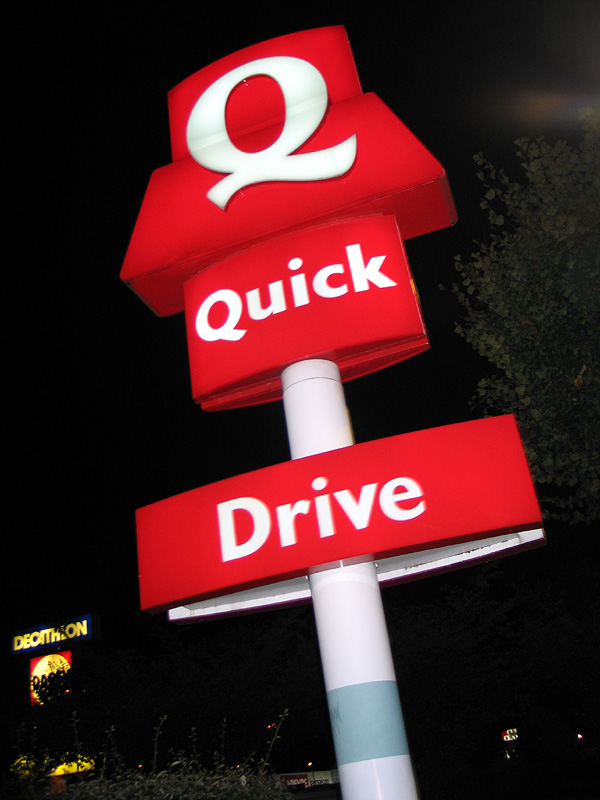
A Quick drive takeway, at Montigny-lès-Cormeilles, Val d'Oise, France

Quick Restaurants is an originally Belgian chain of hamburger fast food restaurants currently based in Bobigny, Seine-Saint-Denis, France. Quick was founded in 1971 by Belgian entrepreneur Baron François Vaxelaire and operates around 400 restaurants.

Quick is similar in theme to McDonald's or Burger King. In 2007, it was taken over by the French government's investment holding company, CDC, and was purchased by Burger King in February 2016. In September 2016, QSR Belgium bought back restaurants of Belgium and Luxembourg to Bertrand Group.

== History ==
The chain was first established in 1971 by retail entrepreneur Baron Vaxelaire (Chairman of the GB/GIB Group) with two restaurants, one in Schoten, just outside Antwerp and another one in Waterloo, south of Brussels. The first Quick in France was opened in Aix-en-Provence on July 19, 1980. By December 31, 2010, it operated over 400 restaurants in Belgium, France, Luxembourg and the French overseas departments or territories of Réunion, New Caledonia, Guadeloupe and Martinique. 72% of these restaurants are operated as franchises.

Quick previously operated in the UK and The Netherlands during the 1980s and 1990s, including a branch in London's Leicester Square, and in Rotterdam, but these are long since closed. From around 2007-08 Quick also had restaurants in Morocco and Algiers, Algeria, as well as Moscow and Tula in Russia, but these have also closed. Currently there are outlets in Morocco, two outlets in Tunis, Tunisia.

In September 2016, QSR Belgium bought back restaurants of Belgium and Luxembourg to Bertrand Group.

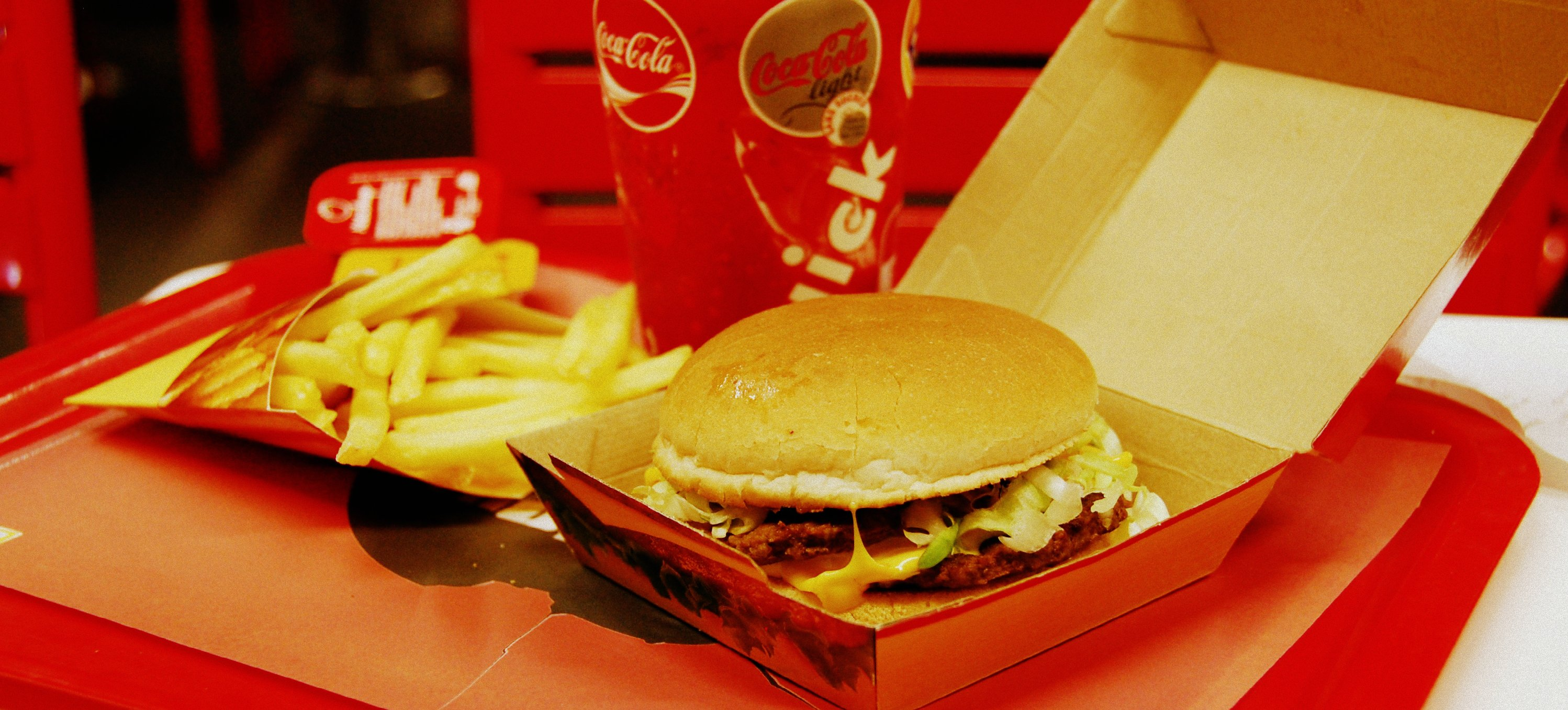
The Giant is one of the hamburgers served by Quick restaurants

In February 2010, Quick announced that eight of its French franchises would offer halal menus to cater to the Muslim population, a number that increased to 22 in August 2010, and only halal menus are being served since then. The move caused controversy from politicians across various parties, including Roubaix's mayor, Marine Le Pen of the National Front, and the UMP, France's ruling political party.

In 2011, Quick unveiled Le Double Mix, a two-in-one sandwich featuring a bread-bun done two different ways on each half, with each side having its own dressings. Available in hamburger or chicken varieties, Le Double Mix was sold as a limited-run sandwich, through April 18, 2011.

== Death of Benjamin Orset ==
On January 22, 2011, 14-year-old Benjamin Orset died after eating two hamburgers at a Quick restaurant in Avignon, France. An autopsy report concluded that he died from food poisoning. Traces of staphylococci were detected in the boy's body, as well as in five of the eight employees. Quick's managing director, Jacques-Edouard Charret, refused to accept responsibility for the death of the boy. However, the investigation found that the death of Orset was a direct result of the meal he had eaten at Quick the day before. Admitting the possibility of a "local failure" rather than any problems with the products supplied centrally, Quick took control of the Avignon restaurant back from the franchisee. Quick also promised to "strengthen its controls and hygiene measures, which are already stricter than the legal standards".

== Morocco ==
In 2003, Quick opened their first restaurant in Casablanca by the biggest movie theater in the country, Megarama. In 2016, the Ténor group became franchiseholder for Quick in Morocco. They opened in Agdal, Rabat another restaurant. Later in 2016, two new restaurants opened, one in Maârif, Casablanca, and the other in Gueliz, Marrakech. From 2017 restaurants with drive through access were opened, the first in Targa, Marrakech, followed by a second one in El Jadida in 2018 and a third one in August 2019 in Dar Bouaaza. Also in 2019 a Quick restaurant opened on the top floor of the Ryad Square shopping mall in Rabat, Hay Riad. In 2022 the first restaurant in Rabat moved to the food court of the Arribat Shopping Mall. In 2023, Quick opened a new restaurant in Saïdia.

== See also ==
- List of hamburger restaurants
