= GB (supermarket) =

Belgian supermarket chain

GB Group
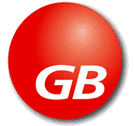
- Industry: Retail
- Founded: 1958
- Founder: François Vaxelaire
- Defunct: 2000
- Headquarters: Evere (Brussels), Belgium
- Products: Groceries
- Parent: GIB Group
- Subsidiaries: GB Express; Maxi GB; Super GB
- Website: carrefour.eu

GB (Grand Bazar) was a Belgian supermarket chain, until 2000 owned by the GIB Group when it was taken over by the Carrefour Group.

== History ==
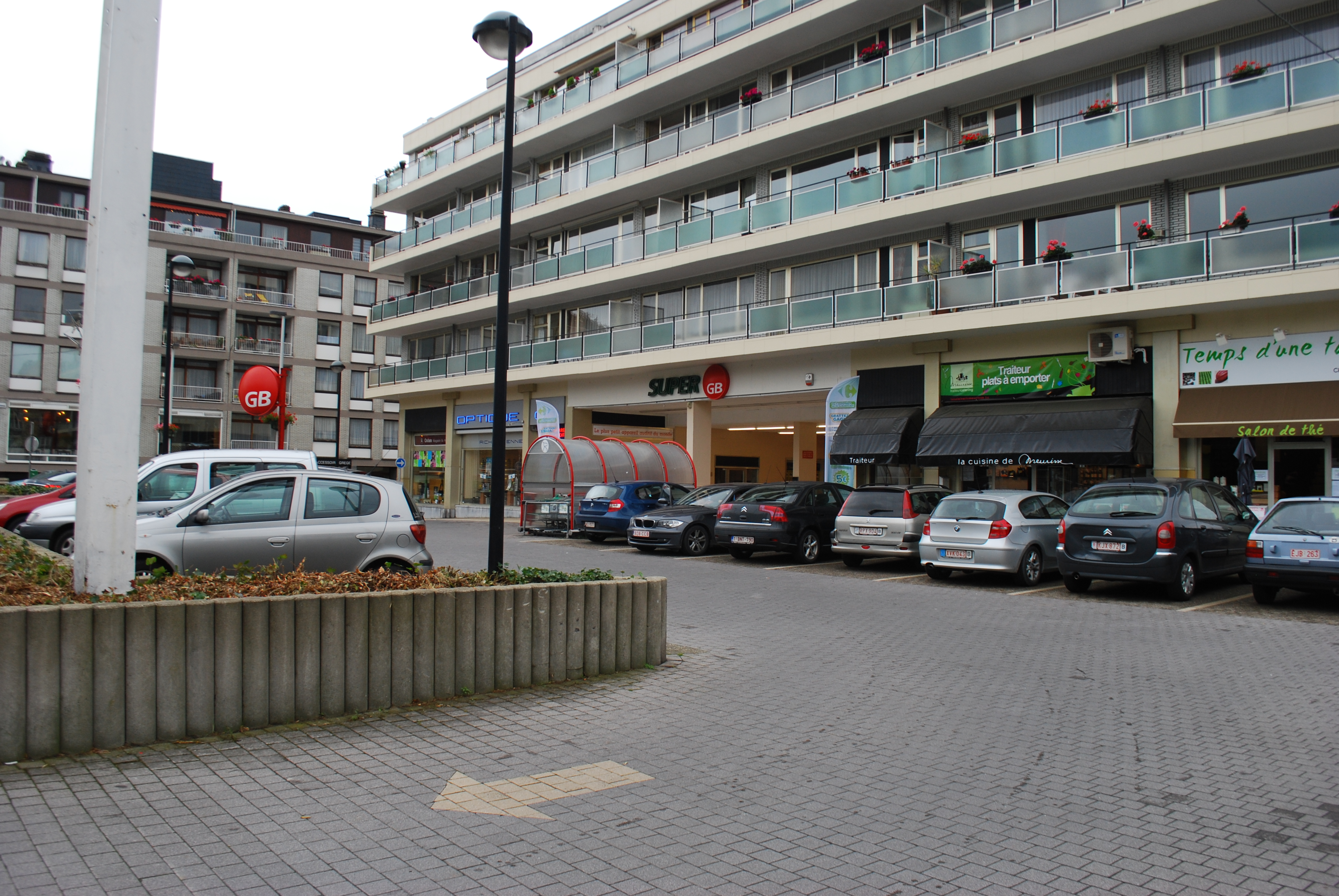
A Super GB store in Embourg (Chaudfontaine), Belgium.

In 1958 the first Super GB is created and opened.

In 1961 the first GB hypermarkets, the first ever stores of this format in Europe, are created under the name of Superbazar in Auderghem, Anderlecht and Bruges. These are the first hypermarkets to open outside the united States. The SuperBazar stores all were reorganized as Maxi GB in 1985.

In 1997 the first GB Express is opened in Berchem-Sainte-Agathe, in the same year, Super GB Partner and Contact GB are created.

In July 2000, Carrefour Group S.A. takes over the GIB Group and modernizes and rebrands all Maxi GB hypermarkets to Carrefour, the other GB stores stays under the GB brand, all those stores will also be renovated.

In 2007 Super GB, Super GB Partner and Contact GB all become Carrefour GB and GB Express stores become Carrefour Express.

Since 2009, Carrefour GB stores in Belgium are re-branding to Carrefour Market, all GB stores will eventually be a Market store in Belgium in 2013/2014.

In 2010 some of these Carrefour supermarkets were closed in a reorganization, while a few of them in Brussels and Wallonia were sold to an independent franchise together with Champion supermarkets, which became re-branded, as Carrefour Market-Groupe Mestdagh.

As of May 2013, there are 58 GB supermarkets left in Belgium, 28 Champion stores in Wallonia, and 431 GB stores have already become Carrefour Market.

== Stores ==
GB Group had several different supermarket stores:

- Super GB, the main supermarket stores, became Carrefour GB in 2007.
- Super GB Partner, supermarkets, became Carrefour GB in 2007.
- Contact GB, smaller supermarkets before owned by the Laurus group, became Carrefour GB in 2007.
- GB Express, convenience stores created in 1997 in Berchem-Sainte-Agathe, became Carrefour Express in 2007.
- Maxi GB, hypermarkets, became Carrefour in 2001
- Bigg's Continent, hypermarkets, became Carrefour in 2001.
