= Formido (store) =

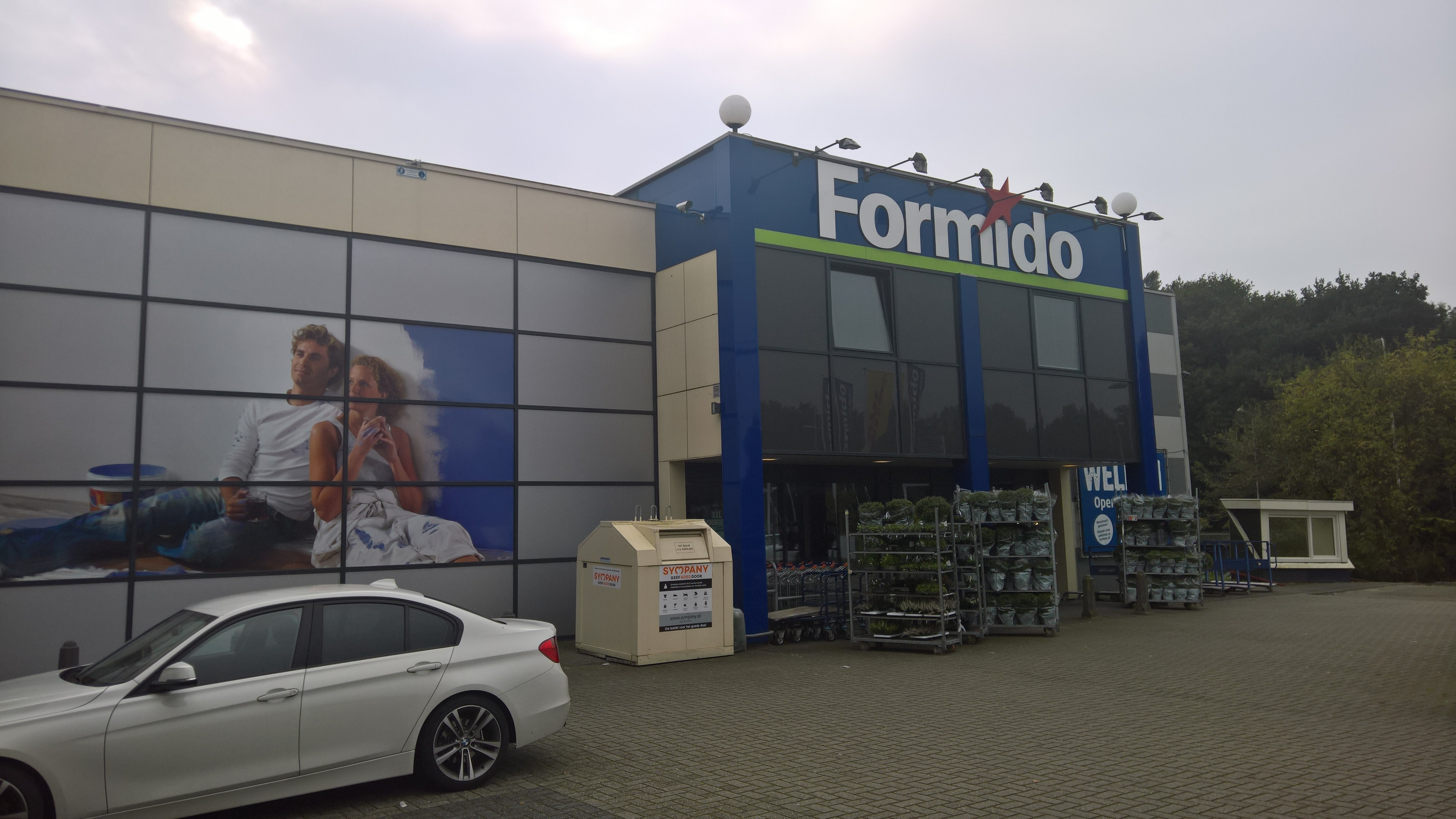
A Formido store.

Formido bouwmarkten B.V. was a Dutch Hardware store-chain. Formido opened its first store on 22 November 1976 in Waddinxveen. It was part of the franchise-organisation Maxeda, which headquarters is located in Amsterdam. As of 2011 Formido had 80 stores, all of which were located in the Netherlands. Of these stores, 15 were managed by Formido and 65 were franchised. Maxeda also owns the Hardware store-chain Praxis and Brico.

In the first half year of 2008 Formido, Praxis and Brico had a combined revenue of 755 million euro.

In September 2017 Maxeda announced that they would deprecate the Formido brand and replace the stores with the Praxis formula.
