= Maxeda =

Dutch retail company

Maxeda DIY Group
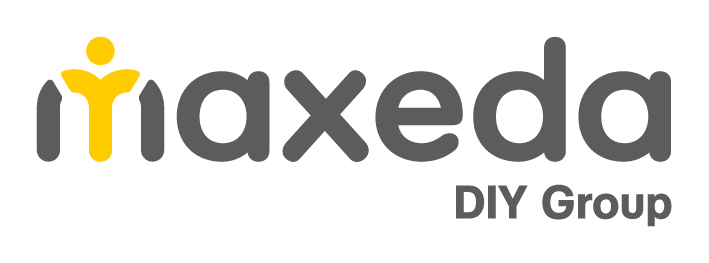
- Type: Private
- Industry: Retail
- Founded: 1999; 27 years ago
- Headquarters: Amsterdam, Netherlands
- Key people: Guy Colleau (CEO)
- Products: General merchandise, financial services
- Brands: Brico, Praxis, BricoPlanit. 2004–10: V&D, La Place, De Bijenkorf. 2004–7: HEMA.
- Revenue: € 1.337 Billion (2015)
- Operating income: € 101 Million (2013/2014)
- Owner: Kohlberg Kravis Roberts
- Number of employees: 7,000
- Website: www.maxeda.nl

Maxeda is a Dutch retail company owned by American investment firm Kohlberg Kravis Roberts & Co. (KKR) which is currently a market leader in the DIY retailing in The Netherlands, Belgium and Luxembourg. When Maxeda acquired Vendex KBB (KBB = Koninklijke Bijenkorf Beheer), Maxeda owned the three most prominent Dutch department stores: Vroom & Dreesmann and De Bijenkorf, both sold in 2010, and HEMA, sold in 2007.

== Activities ==
Maxeda DIY Group is the market leader in the DIY segment and has 345 stores in the Benelux and more than 7,000 employees. Most stores have a floor space of 3,000 to 5,000 m^{2} and carry the name Praxis in the Netherlands (195 stores) and Brico in Belgium and Luxembourg (153 stores). Annual turnover is approximately 1.3 billion. All stores have a total of more than 1 million m^{2} of retail space, with more than 1.5 million customers in the store and online every week.

== History ==
The company was created in 1999 after a merger of Vendex (previously its largest chain Vroom & Dreesmann) and Koninklijke Bijenkorf Beheer (KBB) (with De Bijenkorf and Hema). From 1999 to 2004 it was called Vendex KBB NV.

In 2004, it was announced that Vendex KBB NV would be taken over by a group of investors, Kohlberg Kravis Roberts & Co (KKR), Change Capital Partners and AlpInvest Partners (united in the consortium VDXK Acquisition BV led by KKR). Change Capital later left VDXK. In July 2004, Vendex KBB was definitively taken over by VDXK after all shares were acquired by the group.

Until 2 August 2004, Vendex KBB was listed in the Midkap index of Euronext Amsterdam. The company was converted from an NV into a BV, after a few months Koninklijke Vendex KBB BV was closed down, and the BV that had set up the investment company to buy Koninklijke Vendex KBB BV was renamed Vendex KBB BV. KBB stood for Koninklijke Bijenkorf Beheer, but because of the loss of the Royal designation, the K had become a letter without meaning.

The company was based in Amsterdam with 25,000 employees (16,000 FTEs) in seven countries (the Netherlands, Belgium, Luxembourg, Denmark, Germany, France and Spain) and net sales of more than €4 billion (2003/04). The CEO was Tony DeNunzio (chairman of the board).

On June 14, 2006, the new owners of Vendex KBB announced that the name was changed to Maxeda to highlight a new business philosophy.

In July 2007, HEMA was sold to the British investment company Lion Capital. The acquisition amount has not been released, but analysts estimate it to be approximately €1.3 billion, roughly equal to HEMA's 2006 sales. At the time, HEMA employed approximately 10,000 employees in 336 branches in the Netherlands, Belgium, Germany and Luxembourg.

The strategy changed around 2010 and Maxeda continued with the DIY activities and all Maxeda Fashion businesses were sold. V&D was quickly sold to Sun Capital Partners, de Bijenkorf to Selfridges Group and lingerie chain Hunkemöller to investment company PAI Partners. In January 2011, M&S Mode, a chain of women's fashion stores, was sold to Excellent Retail Brands group (ERB). At that time, M&S Mode had an international network of 417 stores

In 2016, private equity parties Ardian and Goldentree, as venture investors (or so-called Distressed Debt Funds), became part owners of Maxeda by converting their loans into shares. The director of Maxeda DIY Group Roel van Neerpelt then left for Friesland Campina and was succeeded by a director of Kingfisher, Frenchman Guy Colleau.

== Do-it-yourself chains ==
- Brico (Belgium and Luxembourg)
- BricoPlanit (Belgium)
- Praxis (Netherlands)

== Former chains ==
Clothing

- MS Mode (at the time known as M&S Mode) (Netherlands, Belgium, Luxembourg, Germany, France and Spain) - sold in 2010 to Excellent Retail Brands
- Hunkemöller (Lingerie) (Netherlands, Belgium, Luxembourg, Germany, France, Denmark, Aruba, Curaçao, Saudi Arabia, Bahrain, Qatar, United Arab Emirates, Kuwait) — in 2010 sold to PAI Partners.
- Claudia Sträter (Netherlands, Belgium, Luxembourg and Germany) - sold in 2009

Restaurants

- La Place — sold to Sun European Partners (along with Vroom & Dreesmann)

Department stores

- De Bijenkorf (Netherlands) — in 2010 sold to Wittington Investments for €290 million
- Vroom & Dreesmann (Netherlands) — in 2010 sold to American investment company Sun Capital Partners

Variety stores

- HEMA (Netherlands, Belgium and Germany) — in 2007 sold to the British investment group Lion Capital LLP

Consumer electronics

- Dixons (Netherlands) — sold to Dexcom in 2006

Jewellery and watches

- Schaap & Citroen (Netherlands) - sold in 2009

Do-it-yourself

- Formido (Netherlands) - closed 2020

== See also ==
Philips Computers, former parent of Vendex which sold personal computers under the Headstart brand
