= Hunkemöller =

Dutch clothing manufacturer

Hunkemöller International B.V.
- Industry: Fast fashion
- Founded: 1886
- Products: Lingerie
- Website: hunkemoller.com

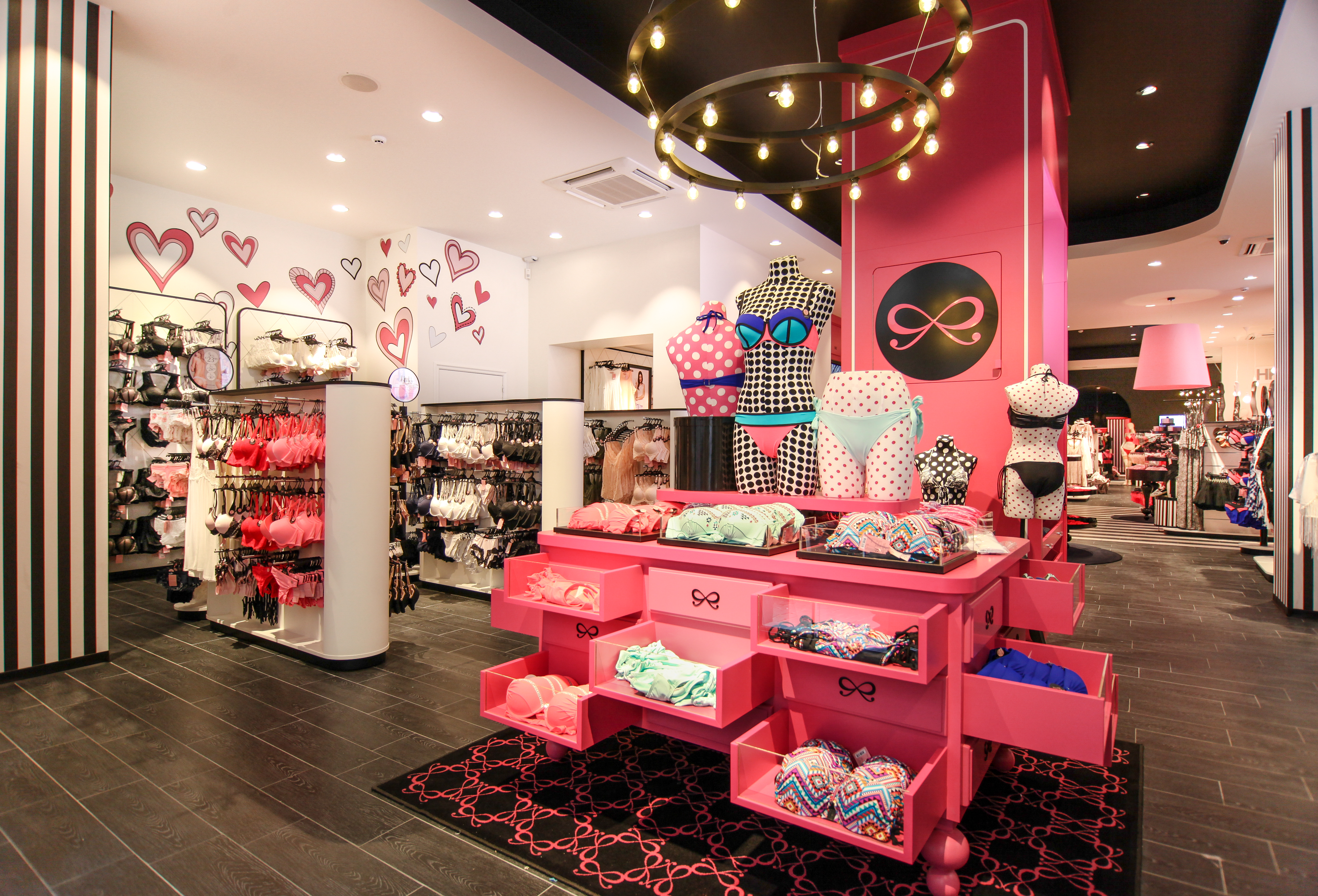
Hunkemöller store in Antwerpen (2017)

Hunkemöller is a Dutch fast fashion retailer selling affordable lingerie and related products.

== Corporate information ==
Hunkemöller identifies itself as a fast fashion company. It was founded in 1886 in Amsterdam as a speciality shop for corsets.

=== Private equity ownership ===
The company was acquired by The Carlyle Group in early 2016. Since the end of 2010 the company belonged to PAI Partners. It previously was part of Maxeda.

In October 2021, The Carlyle Group shared its intention for the sale of the business. In October 2021, its CEO estimated the company's value at €1bn (£855.45m). In 2022, Carlyle sold the company but remained a minority shareholder.

=== Greenwashing ===
In 2022, the German consumer advocate filed a lawsuit against Hunkemöller for misleading advertising after Hunkemöller claimed products were sustainable when they were not produced with sustainable materials.
