= Vroom & Dreesmann =

Dutch retail chain

- Industry: Department store
- Founded: 1887; 139 years ago
- Founder: Willem Vroom; Anton Dreesmann
- Defunct: 15 February 2016; 10 years ago
- Fate: Bankruptcy
- Headquarters: Netherlands
- Number of locations: 67 (2016)
- Area served: Netherlands
- Key people: John van der Ent (CEO)
- Brands: V&D, La Place
- Number of employees: 10,000 (2016)
- Parent: Sun Capital Partners
- Website: vd.nl

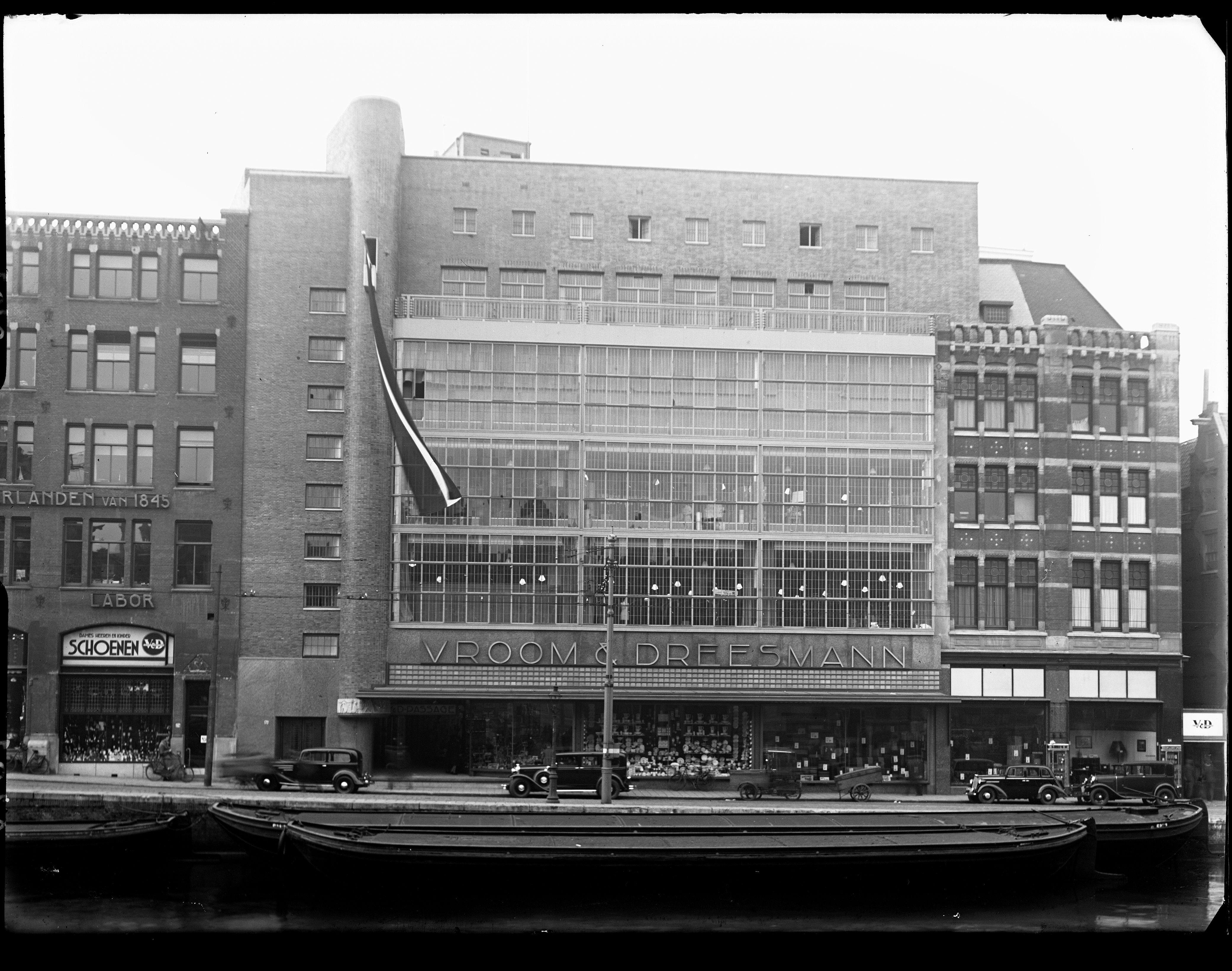
Amsterdam store on the Rokin, 1930

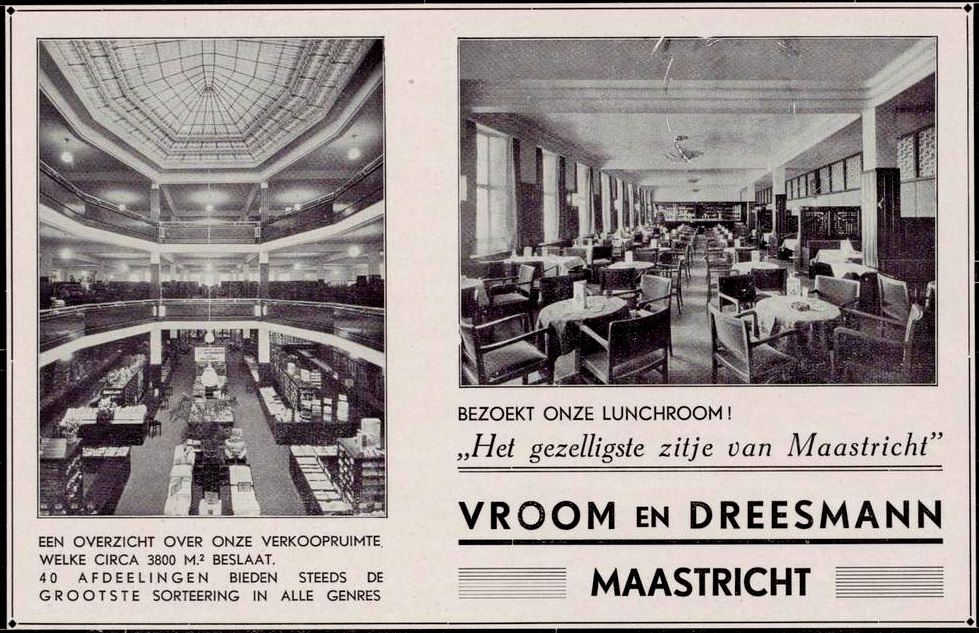
Ad for the Maastricht store, 1935

Vroom & Dreesmann logo in the 1980s

Vroom & Dreesmann (V&D) was a Dutch chain of department stores founded in 1887.

In 2015, V&D operated 67 branches throughout the Netherlands, of which 64 department stores and 3 standalone locations of La Place, V&D's former subsidiary restaurant chain which had in-house and standalone restaurants throughout the country. The department stores' product range included clothing and shoes, jewelry, cosmetics, books, home-entertainment products, electric goods, stationery, cards and posters, furniture and homewares. Most branches also had a La Place in-house restaurant, a travel agent and an ATM. Larger branches also had a bakery.

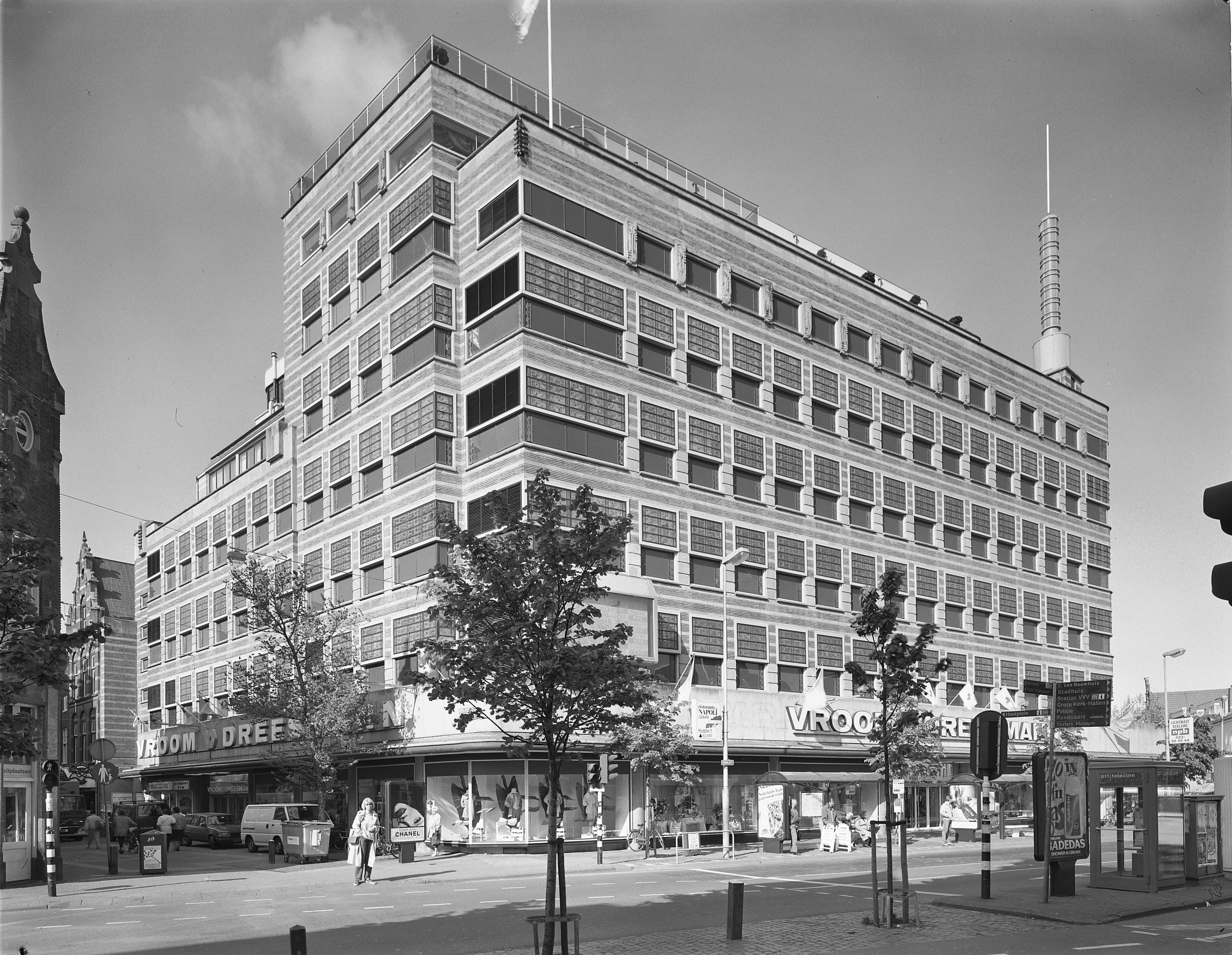
Vroom & Dreesmann on the Grote Houtstraat in Haarlem, 1993

== History ==
=== Foundation and quick expansion, 1887–1972 ===
Vroom & Dreesmann was founded in 1887 by Willem Vroom and Anton Dreesmann. The first branch opened in Weesperstraat^{[nl]} in Amsterdam.

Vroom & Dreesmann expanded rapidly throughout the Netherlands until 1972.

=== Vroom & Dreesmann hits a plateau, 1972–2007 ===
Vroom & Dreesmann was reorganized into Vendex in 1972 and Vendex International in 1982. In 1987, the in-house restaurant chain La Place was opened. In 1988, Anton Dreesman was replaced as the company's CEO with Abraham Verhoef.

In 1993 V&D took over three branches of the bankrupt Rotterdam department store chain Ter Meulen: in Zoetermeer, in the Oosterhof shopping centre in Rotterdam, and in Almere. The former Ter Meulen stores were converted to the V&D format.

In 1999, Vendex merged with Koninklijke Bijenkorf Beheer (KBB), the parent company of retail chains De Bijenkorf and Hema, and was renamed into Vendex KBB. It also inherited KBB's royal designation "Koninklijk".

In 2004, Vendex KBB was sold to a new investor group that included KKR, Alpinvest and Permira. It lost its royal designation as a result, yet was allowed to keep the K in its name. In 2005, Vendex KBB changed its name into Maxeda.

=== V&D, downfall and bankruptcy, 2007–2015 ===
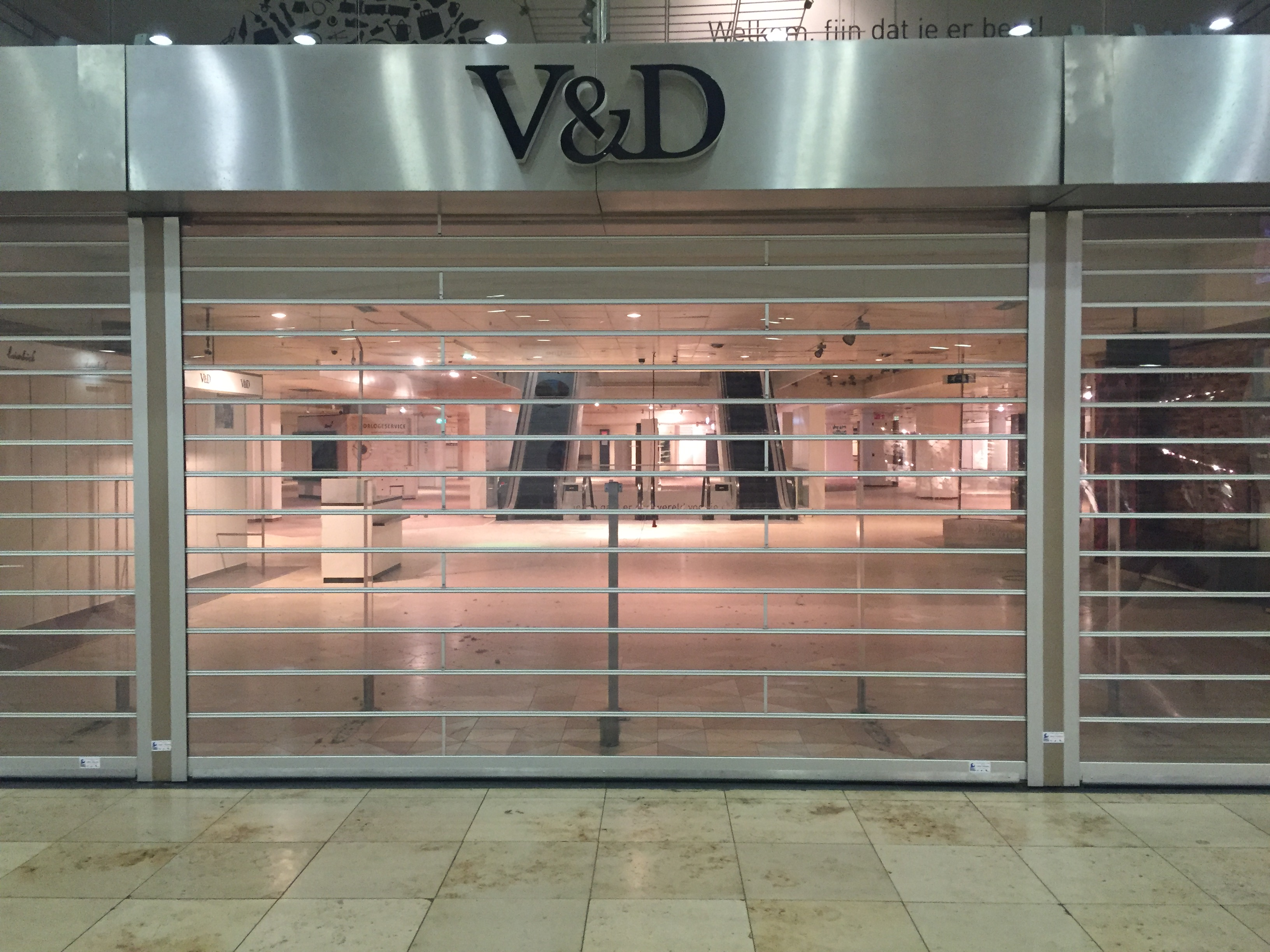
Closed and empty V&D in Utrecht after bankruptcy.

In 2007, Vroom & Dreesmann was rebranded into V&D and the red, white and blue logo was replaced with a black logo. In 2008, the vd.nl website was launched. From 2010 to 2015, V&D was a subsidiary of Sun Capital Partners.

In February 2015, it was unclear whether V&D would continue to exist. Among the reasons mentioned for its demise:

- The rise of the internet with online shopping and the late start of V&D e-commerce.
- Cheaper brick and mortar stores such as the Swedish H&M and Irish Primark that competed successfully for V&D's market share.
- Lacking clear identity, in comparison with these affordable stores and the more exclusive ones, such as De Bijenkorf.
- The sale of the V&D real estate by the joint British-American ownership before Sun Capital, possibly increasing the department store's operational costs.

After negotiations, real estate owners agreed to reduce the area and costs of the rental properties, employees agreed to a gradual pay cut, and the V&D owners agreed to inject capital, but not the amount needed. Eventually, this problem was also resolved. In mid-March 2015, the rent reduction in Den Bosch and Heerlen remained unresolved. In May 2015, V&D kept working on reducing the rents and a new business plan, to be implemented in the short term, which aimed to make V&D profitable again in two years.

In December 2015, the firm was again under court protection for insolvency. The website no longer sold articles. V&D gift cards as well as air miles were no longer accepted for payment. On 31 December 2015, V&D was declared bankrupt. The appointed liquidators kept the department stores open, pending restructuring and takeover talks with interested parties. On 26 January 2016, Supermarket chain Jumbo announced that it had acquired the subsidiary La Place. Talks continued for selling the stores that focused in February on Roland Kahn's retailer CoolCat. By 16 February, the negotiations for a takeover had broken down. About 10,000 employees lost their jobs.

=== Hudson's Bay, 2017–2019 ===
In V&D's latter days, Canadian retail group Hudson's Bay Company negotiated with the landlords to acquire most of the company's premises without having an interest in the company itself. In May 2016 Hudson's Bay Company (HBC) announced that it would take over up to 20 former V&D locations by 2017. HBC said the expansion would cost CAD $340 million and create 2,500 jobs in the stores and another 2,500 temporary construction jobs. The Dutch stores would operate under the "Hudson's Bay" and "Saks Off Fifth" brands.

As of mid-2019, Hudson's Bay Company still operated 15 stores in the defunct Vroom & Dreesmann locations. On August 31, 2019, the company announced that all 15 of those stores would close by year-end.

=== V&D online only, 2018– ===
The brand name V&D was bought by entrepreneurs Ronald van Zetten, Roland Kahn, and Jaco Scheffers. On 5 September 2018 a web store with the V&D brand was opened. In 2025, the brand was acquired by the Lifestyle Retail Group (LRG Online), a UK platform and technology company owned by Chris Griffin and Matt Purt. LRG also owns and operates a number of other retail fascias, including Dress-for-Less in Germany, AFOUND in Sweden, Tobedressed in the Netherlands, DrievIP in Spain and Secret Sales in the UK.
