= Praxis (store) =

Dutch chain of home improvement superstores

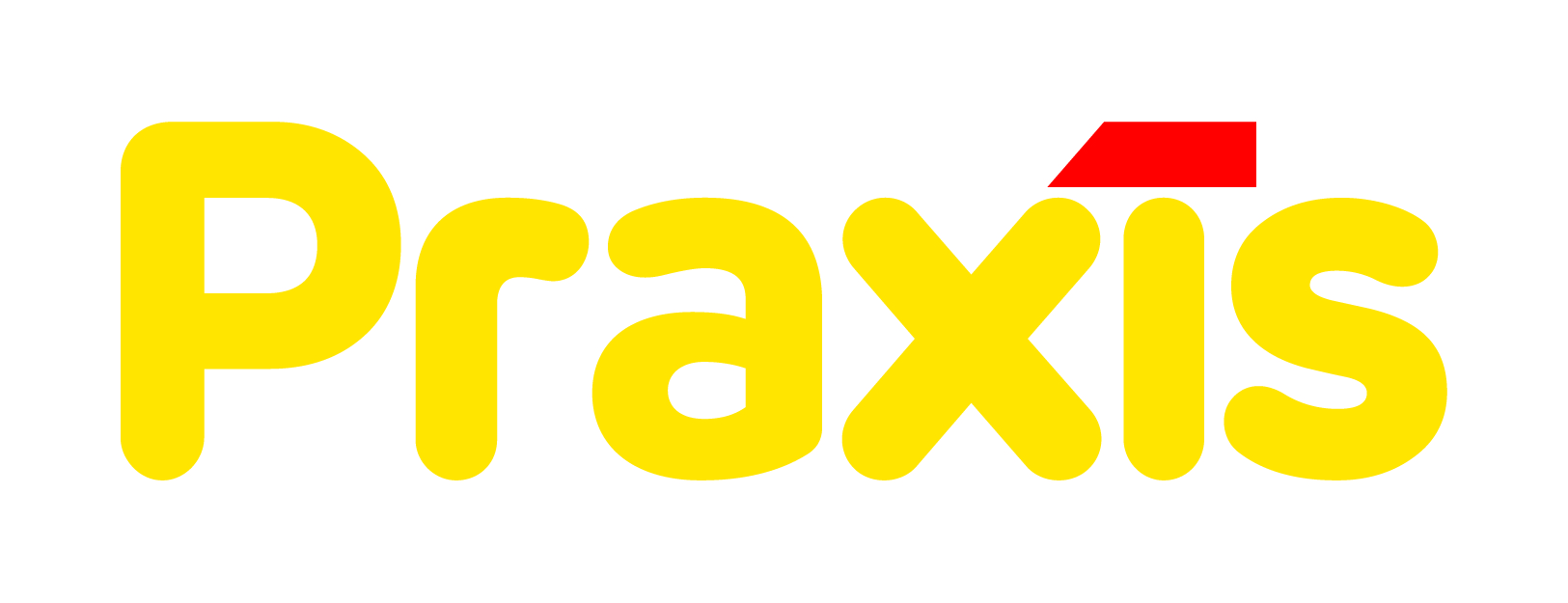
- Industry: Retail
- Founded: 1978 in Venlo
- Headquarters: Diemen, Netherlands
- Number of locations: 145 chains as of 2009
- Area served: Netherlands
- Key people: Joost de Beijer
- Products: Hardware stores
- Owner: Maxeda DIY
- Number of employees: 3,500

Praxis, full name Praxis Doe-Het-Zelf Center B.V. (Praxis Do-It-Yourself Centre B.V.) is a Dutch chain of home improvement (a.k.a. DIY superstores) which offer hardware, garden centres, lumber and other products and services. The company started in 1978 in Venlo and as of 2024 it has 192 stores across the Netherlands, averaging 3,500 m^{2} (38,000 sq ft) in size. Some that are 5,000–8,000 m^{2} (54,000–86,000 sq ft) in size are branded Praxis Mega, or Praxis Mega & Tuin if they have a garden centre. Praxis has a number of smaller stores in cities branded Praxis City. Praxis is headquartered in the Amsterdam suburb of Diemen and employs about 5000 people.

Praxis focuses on construction products and on decorative do-it-yourself products. It also supplies garden materials. It is known to the general public for its sponsoring of the RTL 4 television program Eigen Huis & Tuin since 1990.

Praxis is part of the Maxeda retail group. As of 2011, the Maxeda board member responsible for the DIY division was Nick Wilkinson.
