= HEMA (store) =

Dutch discount retail chain

Hema
- Native name: Hollandsche Eenheidsprijzen Maatschappij Amsterdam
- Type: Private
- Industry: Retail
- Founded: November 4, 1926; 100 years ago in Amsterdam
- Founder: Arthur Isaac; Leo Meijer
- Headquarters: Amsterdam, Netherlands
- Area served: Netherlands; Austria; Belgium; Germany; Luxembourg; France; Spain; Mexico; Qatar; United Arab Emirates
- Key people: Saskia Egas Reparaz
- Services: furnishings fashion photo service foods and other
- Revenue: €2.2 billion (2024)
- Net income: €93 million (2024)
- Owner: Van Eerd family (100%, 2026-present)
- Website: www.hema.nl

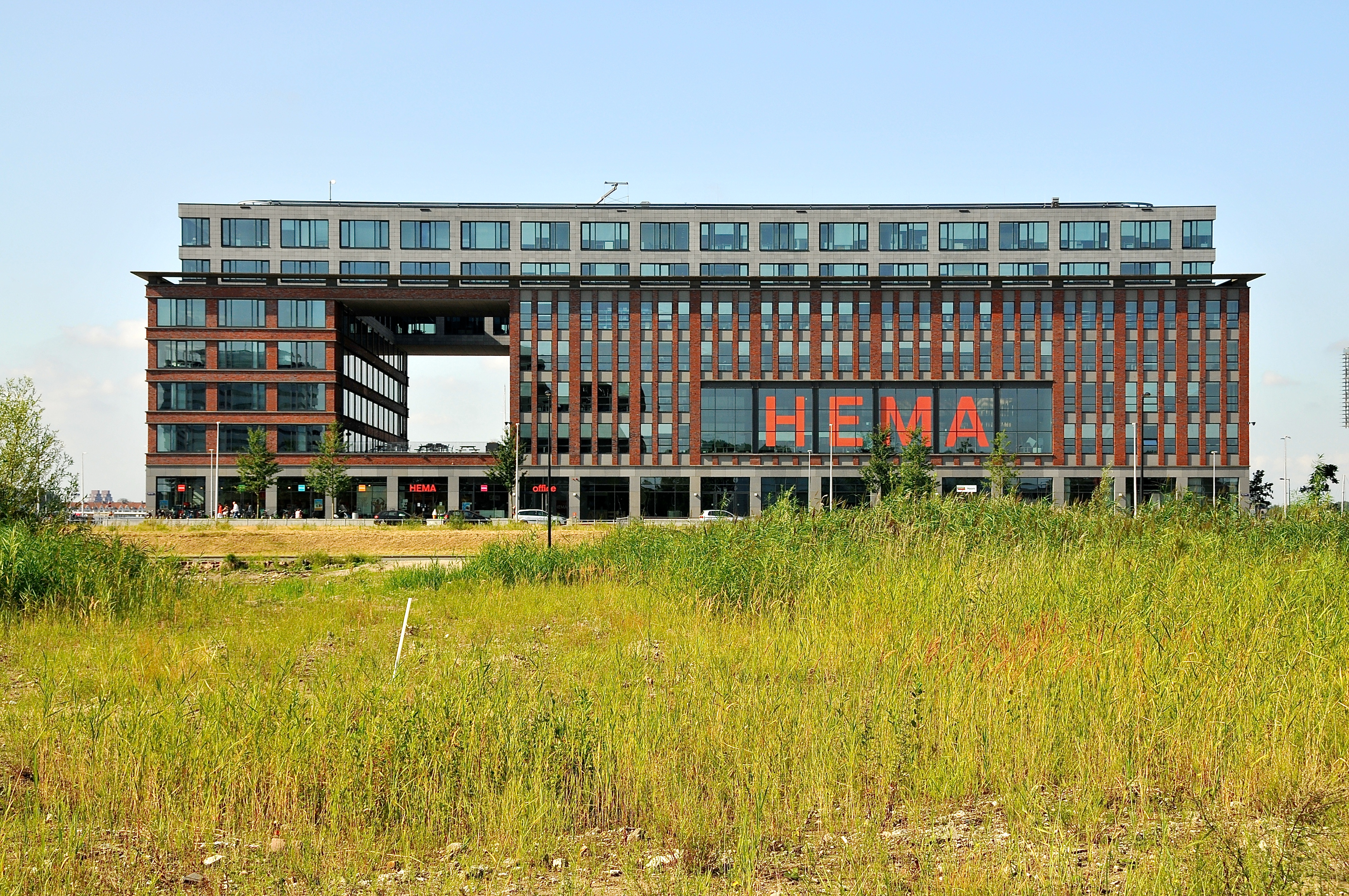

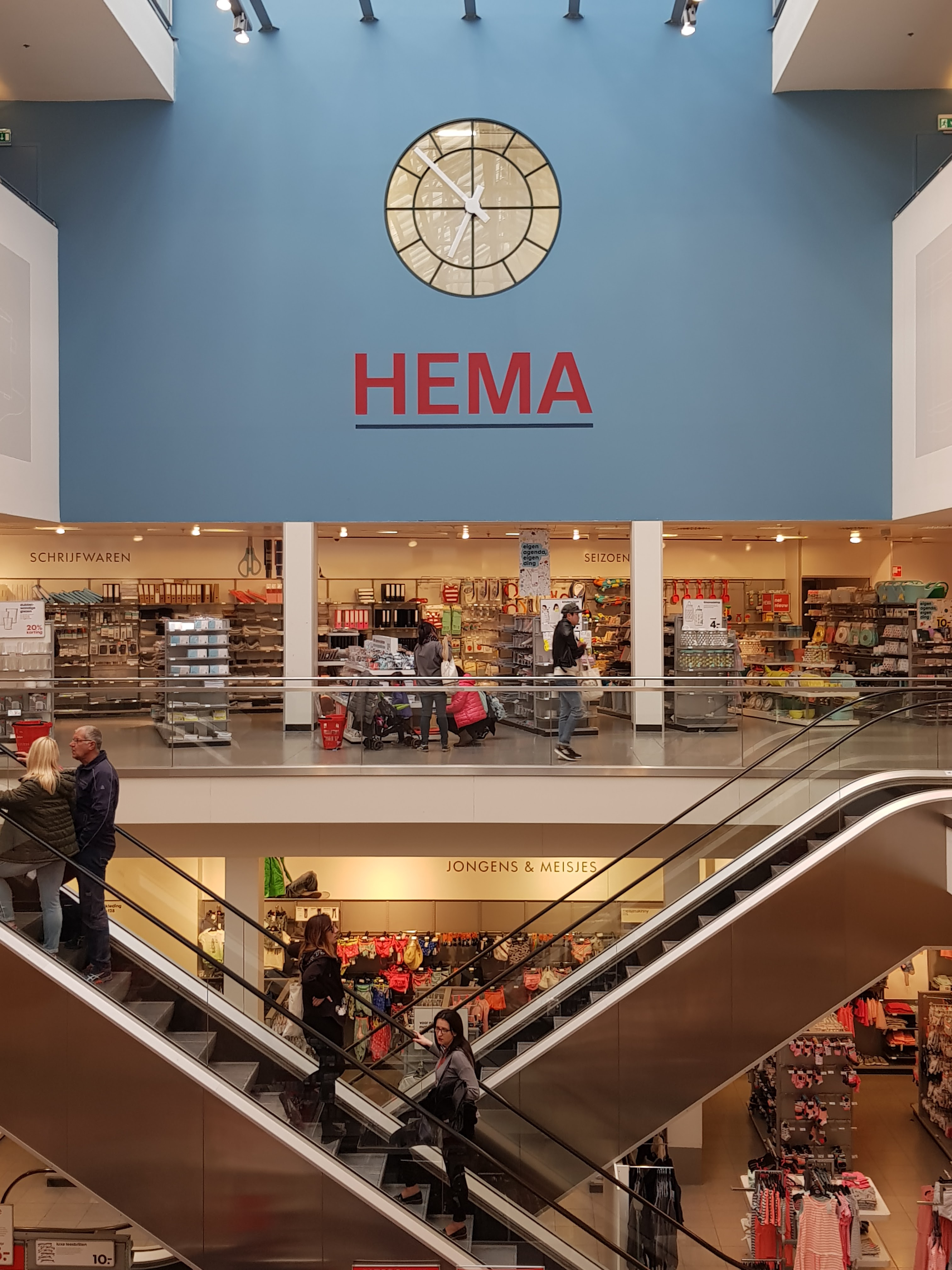
Inside HEMA on Nieuwendijk, Amsterdam, 2017

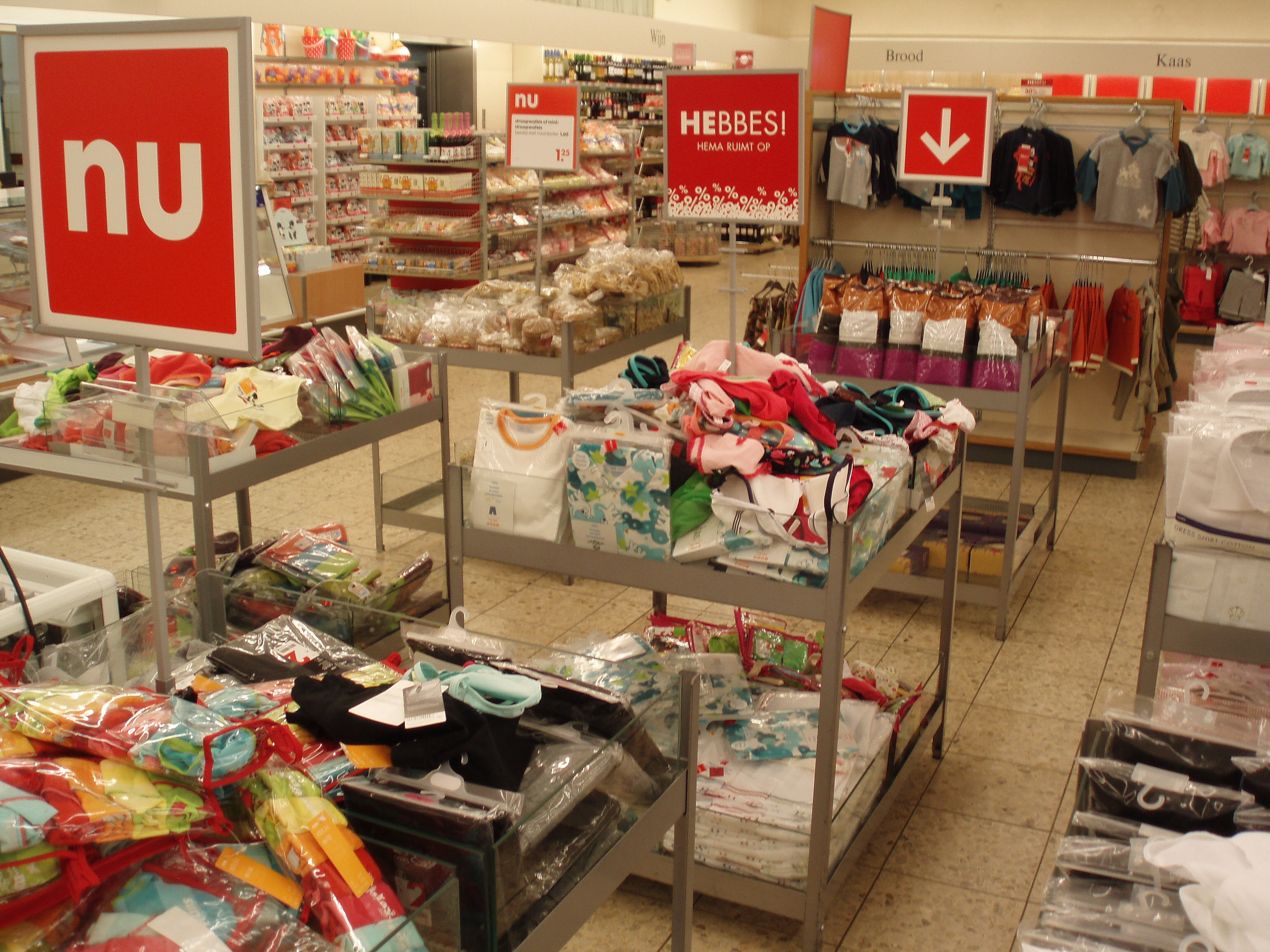
Merchandise for sale at a Dutch HEMA store

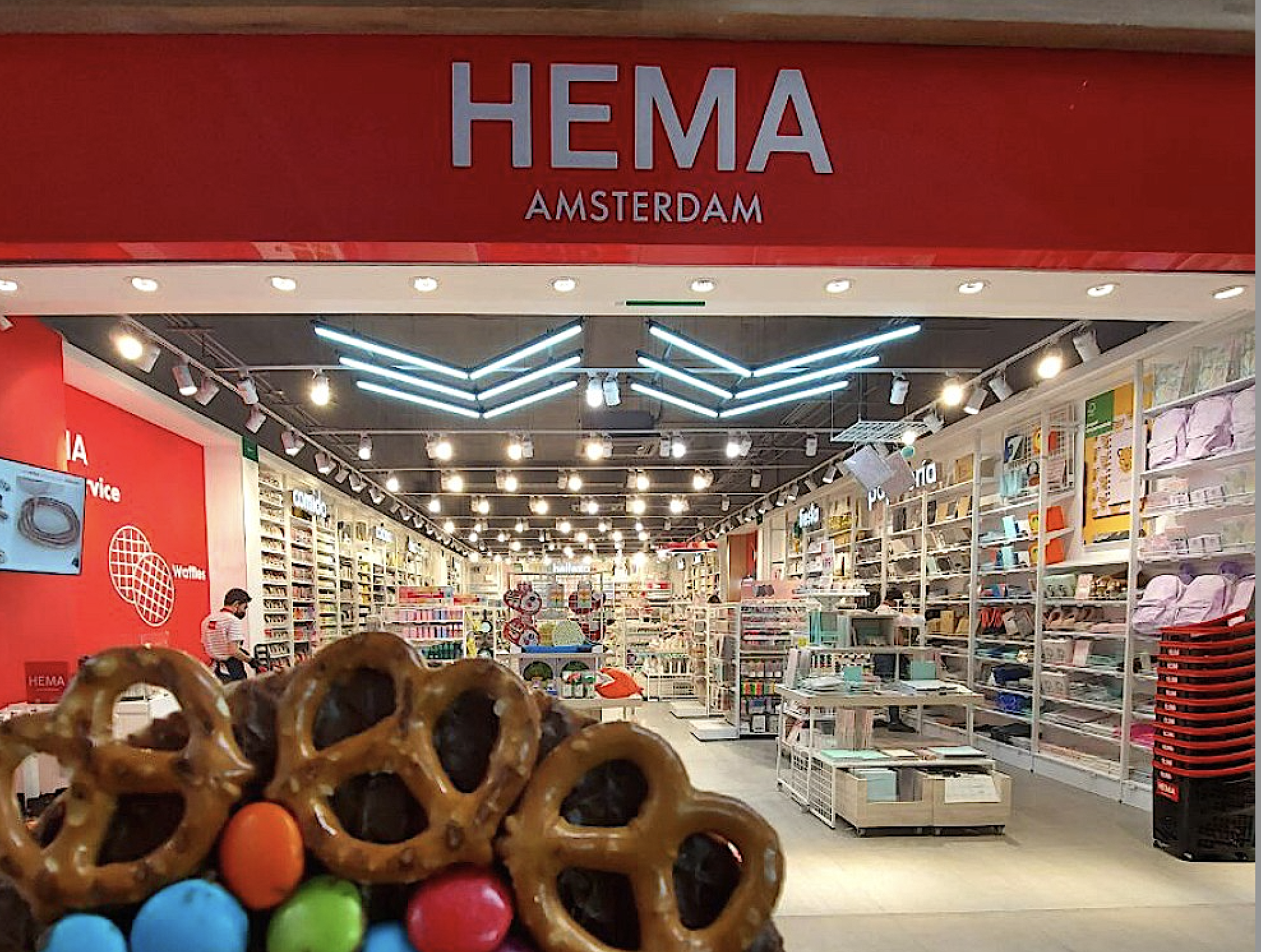
HEMA in Mexico City at Encuentro Oceanía mall

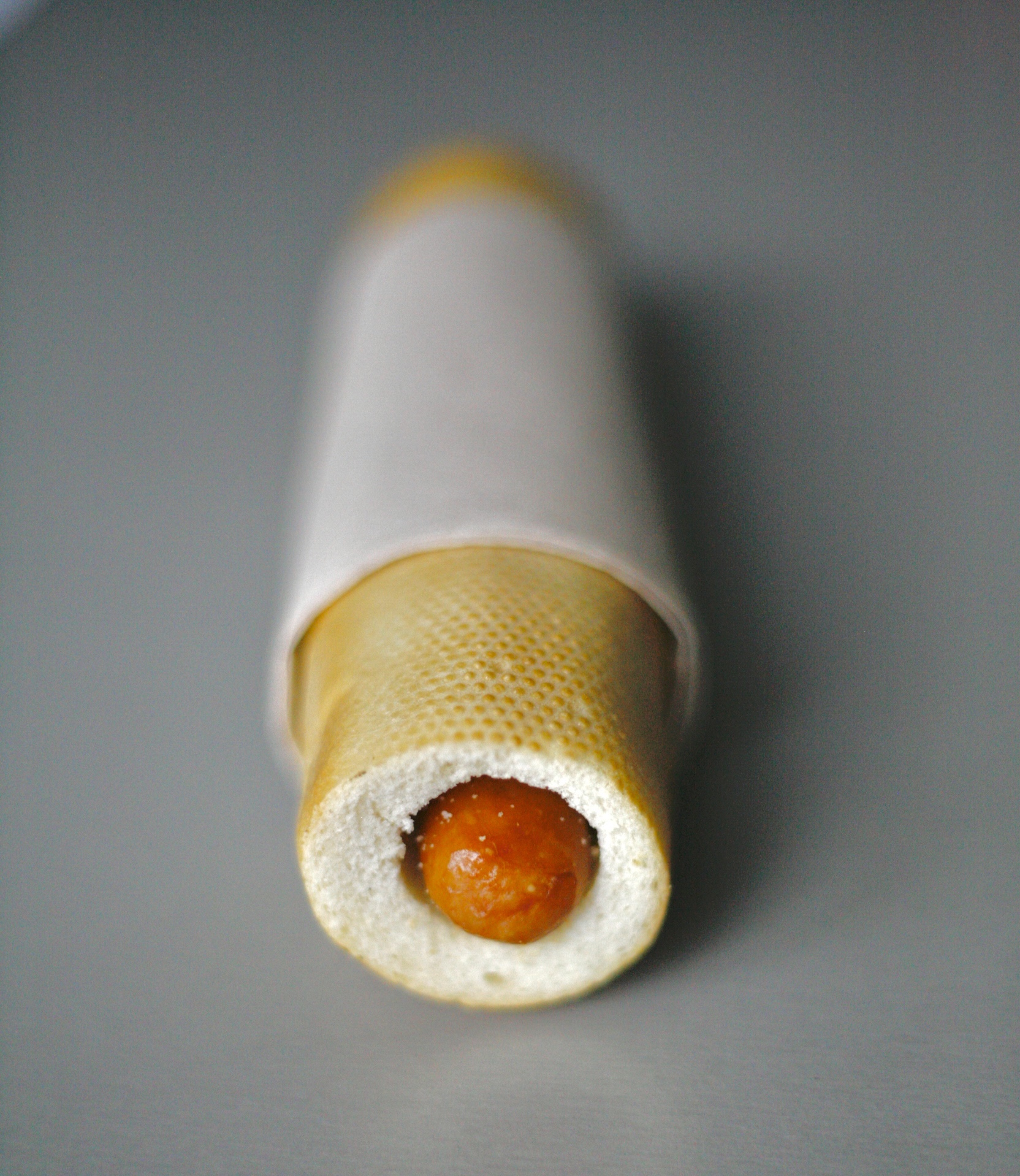
The Hema hot dog is a staple of the Dutch retailer

HEMA (Dutch pronunciation: [ˈɦeːmaː]; originally an acronym for Hollandsche Eenheidsprijzen Maatschappij Amsterdam, "Holland Unitary Pricing Company Amsterdam") is a Dutch variety chain store known by relatively low pricing of generic household goods.

In 2023, the chain had almost 750 branches in 9 countries. Most of its products are manufactured by the chain itself – often featuring original designs.

== History ==
The first HEMA opened in Amsterdam on November 4, 1926, by Arthur Isaac and Leo Meijer, owners of the luxury department store De Bijenkorf. The relative economic boom in the Netherlands in the period 1900–1930 benefited HEMA.

Originally, it functioned as a price-point retailer at prime locations in town centres, goods were sold using standard prices (hence its name), with everything having a standard price of 10, 25 or 50 cents, and later also 75 and 100 cents.

Because the chain was associated with poor people due to its low prices, rich Dutch people didn't want to be seen there. These people corrupted the acronym to Hier Eet Men Afval (here people/men eat waste/trash).

=== World War II ===
During World War II, a number of Jewish employees (there was a relatively high number because of the Jewish roots of the company) were murdered by the Nazis during the Holocaust. The store was also associated with Jews being a, "Jewish business". Windows were smashed, antisemitic slogans were written on shops, etc. The chain even lost its Rotterdam branch during the bombings and reopened in Blijdorp. Mr S. Van der Sluis was the first Jewish employee to be captured by the SS and by 1942 all Jewish staff members were dismissed.

In the beginning of the war HEMA had 2,036 employees and by the end, they had only 735. Additionally, Branches in Arnhem, Rotterdam, and Nijmegen were completely annihilated during the allied bombings. Those who were murdered in the concentration camps and all those who fell during that period are commemorated every year during a wreath laying ceremony on 4 May, the Dutch day of Remembrance of the Dead, at the head office.

=== After World War II ===
After World War II, the standard pricing model could not be sustained and was abandoned. A period of rapid expansion followed. Locations carry a wide variety of goods, including clothing, food, bicycle equipment, gardening tools, and office supplies. In the 1950's it became one of the first Dutch franchises.

Since 1985 they have organized an annual student design competition the best known winner of which is the whistling kettle, Le Lapin, by 1990 winner Nikolai Carels where it has been sold in HEMA stores since 1991. The chains breakthrough and largest expansion came in 1997 when 20 branches opened at once.

HEMA has since been sold and resold several times, once in 2007, again in 2018, and again in 2020.

=== Ownership changes ===
| Year | Remarks |
|---|---|
| 1999 | Koninklijke Bijenkorf Beheer merged with Vroom & Dreesmann to form Vendex KBB |
| 2004 | Maxeda bought Vendex KBB which owned HEMA, V&D and De Bijenkorf. |
| 2007 (July) | HEMA sold to the British investment company Lion Capital. Analysts estimate the purchase at €1.3 billion, roughly equal to HEMA's 2006 sales. At the time, HEMA employed approximately 10,000 employees in 336 branches in the Benelux and Germany. |
| 2018 | Lion Capital sells the chain to Ramphastos Investments, owned by Dutch billionaire Marcel Boekhoorn. However, he later lost control of HEMA to its bondholders. |

=== 21st century ===
In 2010, under Lion Capital ownership, standard pricing was reintroduced. In 2015, Hema was the most indispensable brand in the Netherlands for the 8th time running.

After HEMA's proprietors expressed their intention to potentially sell the business in 2020, Flacks Group and a consortium led by Parcom Capital showed interest in acquiring the chain. In October, Van Eerd Group and Parcom began exclusive negotiations for a joint purchase agreement.

Led by new CEO Egas Reparaz, the company announced in July 2021 its exit from the UK market with the sale of its six stores there, shifting its focus to the Netherlands, Belgium, Luxembourg, and France. Later, it also decided to withdraw from Spain, closing all its stores during 2022.

Two other countries in which it was active in 2021, Germany and Austria, were seen as potential growth markets and would be explored further. Some collaborations in other countries were respected, but not further developed. On November 24, 2021, it was announced that HEMA would sell its bakeries to Bacu, which already baked for Jumbo and would do the same for HEMA.

In February 2026, the Van Eerd family acquired 100% ownership of the chain after purchasing the stake it did not previously hold in the Dutch firm.

== Branches ==
HEMA has also expanded into other countries since the 1990s.

HEMA branches by country:

| Country | Number of stores | Since |
|---|---|---|
| Netherlands | 555 (2018) | 1926 |
| Austria | 7 (2019) | 2018 |
| Belgium | 106(2024) | 1984 |
| France | 78 (2020) | 2009 |
| Germany | 17 (2024) | 2002 |
| Luxembourg | 4 (2016) | 2006 |

On 4 January 2014, Hema's CEO Ronald van Zetten announced that it would branch out to Spain and the United Kingdom opening the first stores within six months as well further expanding in France. The first Spanish store opened on 3 April on Calle Fuencarral in Madrid. The first British store opened in the Victoria Place shopping centre, above Victoria station, in London on 12 June 2014, and six more followed. By the summer of 2021, all had been closed. All stores in Spain closed in 2022.
