= La Place (restaurant chain) =

International Dutch restaurant chain

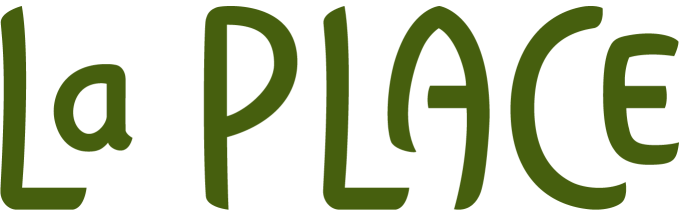
- Genre: Restaurant
- Founded: 1987
- Founder: Paul Bringmann
- Headquarters: Nieuwegein, Netherlands
- Products: Food & drinks
- Revenue: €215 million (2011)
- Parent: Jumbo
- Website: www.laplace.com

La Place is a Dutch restaurant chain, owned by Jumbo, that started as a restaurant chain in the by now bankrupt department store giant Vroom & Dreesmann. La Place has about 100 restaurants in the Netherlands, Belgium, Germany, Indonesia and the United States. By 2026 the number of restaurants, once well over 200 and on three continents, had dwindled to 47. 45 of these are in the Netherlands, 2 in Paris.

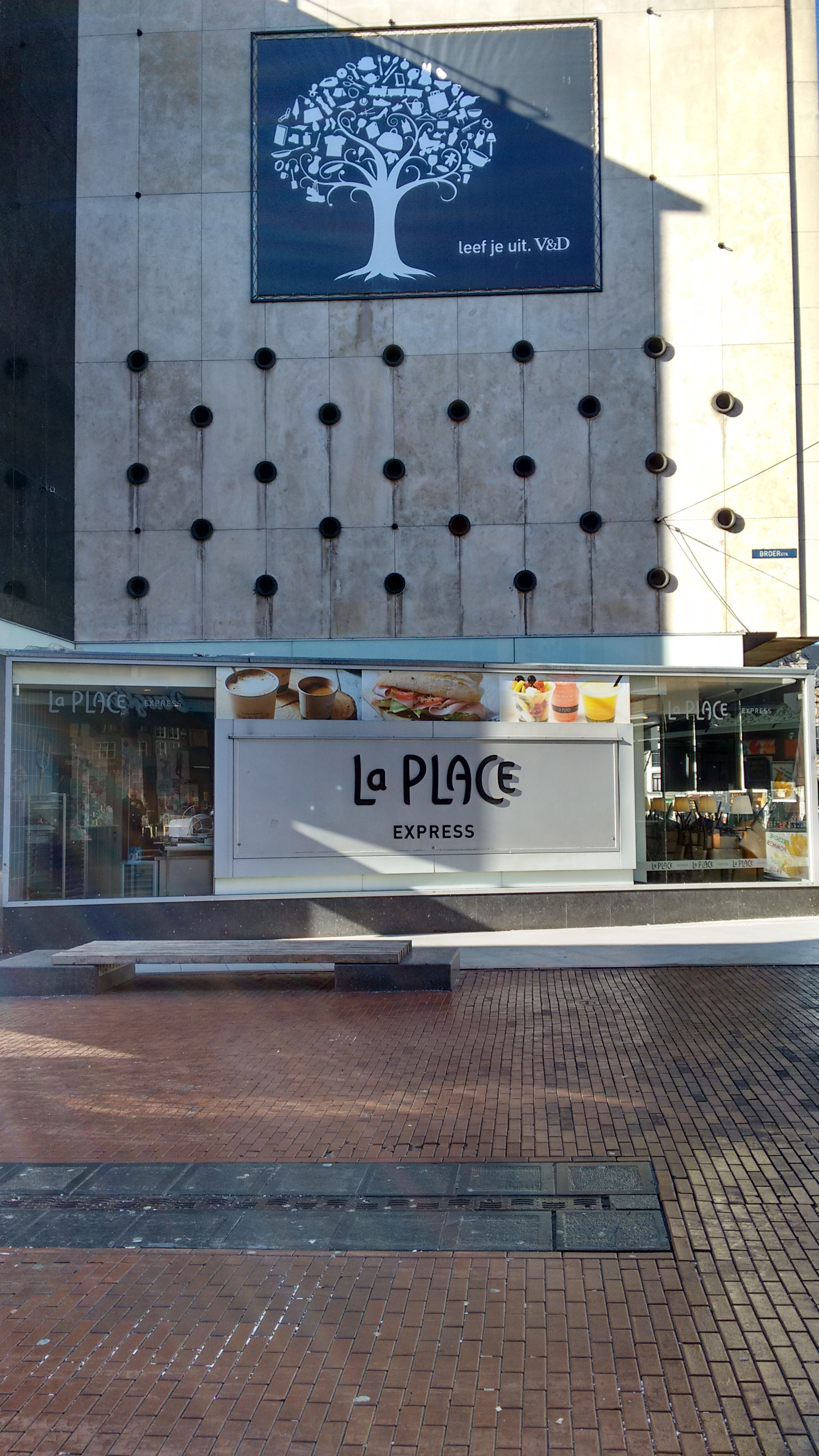
Chain at a V&D store in Nijmegen, Netherlands

== History ==
The first restaurant was opened on 17 September 1987 in Utrecht, Netherlands.

The first restaurant of the restaurant chain in Belgium was opened on 25 October 2007 in Antwerp. Another restaurant in Belgium opened in 2008. In March 2014 both were closed. In March 2010, a third La Place in Belgium opened on the second floor of the new mall K in Kortrijk in Kortrijk. It was also closed in 2014.

In September and November 2013 two new La Place restaurants were opened in Germany. The first one opened in Zweibrücken while the second one opened in Metzingen (Now Closed). On 23 May 2014 a restaurant was opened on Bali. The restaurant is located at the airport Ngurah Rai. On 1 July 2014 a second restaurant was opened at the same airport. On 4 August 2014 a restaurant was opened in the office of Google Inc. in New York City.

On 31 December 2015 V&D and its daughter La Place went bankrupt but continued to operate on Dutch government funds. On 26 January 2016 Jumbo, a Dutch supermarket chain, announced that it had acquired La Place out of bankruptcy for an undisclosed amount of money.

In 2020-2021, about quarter of restaurants were shut down due to the impact of coronavirus. Jumbo retained ownership of only about ten La Place restaurants as Jumbo transferred the operation of more than forty locations to Vermaat group. Nonetheless Jumbo CEO Frits Van Eerd said in 2021 that he saw "a bright future" for La Place, with plans to opens hundreds of La Place locations around the world, although focusing on the Netherlands "with at least a hundred" new outlets in that country. A new concept, La Place Express, a smaller to-go concept for sandwiches and juices located in areas of high foot traffic, would play a crucial role in the expansion, which would be a mix of locations managed by La Place and others being franchises.

== Ownership ==
For years, La Place was owned by the V&D Group Holding, the parent company of the Dutch department store V&D, until it was declared bankrupt on 31 December 2015. Since 2010, the investment company Sun Capital Partners, through its subsidiary Sun European Partners, had been the sole shareholder of the V&D Group Holding. At the time of the bankruptcy, La Place had more than 250 locations worldwide and employed approximately 5,200 people.

A significant part of La Place was sold to the Jumbo Food Group, including the headquarters, the brand name, and 61 "standalone" locations for a total of 48 million euros. These components were incorporated into a new organization, La Place Food B.V. On 4 January 2021, it was announced that the Jumbo Food Group would transfer the operation of a large number of La Place locations to the Vermaat Group as of 1 April 2021. Vermaat took over the employees, assets, and operations of 44 locations, while Jumbo remained the owner of the La Place brand, six owned restaurants, four station locations, and the (inter)national franchise relationships. Jumbo would also continue to focus on the expansion plans for the convenience store chain La Place Express and the rollout of La Place products within Jumbo Supermarkets. In early July 2021, Jumbo CEO Frits van Eerd expressed the ambition that La Place would gain hundreds of additional locations domestically and abroad within a few years.

== Restaurants ==
Number of restaurants per country as of 1 November 2026

Country	First restaurant	Number of restaurants
Netherlands	1987	45
Belgium	2007 (closed in 2015)	0
Germany	2013 (closed in ?)	0
Indonesia	2014 (closed in ?)	0
United States	2014 (closed in ?)	0
Canada	2017 (closed in ?)	0
Spain	2019 (closed in ?)	0
Denmark	2020 (closed in ?)	0
France	?	2
