= List of supermarket chains in Greece =

This is a list of supermarket chains in Greece.

== Convenience stores ==
Name	Stores	Type of store	Parent
AB Shop & Go	25	Convenience store	Ahold Delhaize
4all	120-140	Convenience store	
Festos super & mini market	200-220	Supermarket,Convenience Store	
Kitrino	6	Convenience store	
Mini Stop Kiosk	24-25	Convenience store	
mykiosk®	2	Convenience store	
OK Anytime Markets	95	Convenience store	
Smile Markets	107	Convenience store	
YES! Stores	60-61	Convenience store	

== Supermarkets ==
Name	Stores	Type of store	Parent
Afroditi	20	Supermarket	
Alpha-Beta Vasilopoulos (AB, AB city, AB Food Market, AB Shop&Go)	505	Supermarket	Ahold Delhaize
Ariadni	86	Supermarket	Diamandis Masoutis
Bazaar	150	Supermarket	Bazaar
Chalkiadakis	39	Supermarket	Sklavenitis
Discount Markt	94-95	Supermarket	Σούπερ Μάρκετ Εγνατία Α.Ε.-Egnatia Super Market S.A.
Egnatia Super Market	3	Supermarket	Σουπερ Μάρκετ Εγνατία Α.Ε.-Egnatia Super Market S.A.
Ellinika Market		Supermarket	Diamandis Masoutis
Galaxias	136	Supermarket	Pente SA
Festos super & mini market	200-220	Supermarket,Convenience Store	
GReen Supermarket	3	Supermarket	
Kritikos	160	Supermarket	Diamandis Masoutis
Koutelieris	7	Supermarket	Yioi A.Koutelieri
Lidl	229	Supermarket	Schwarz Gruppe
Market In	146	Supermarket	Market In
Market In Daily's	7	Supermarket	Market In
Market In Economy	6	Supermarket	Market In
Masoutis (incl. Green)	235	Supermarket	Diamandis Masoutis
My Market	222	Supermarket	Metro
Panagiotopoulos Bros S.A.	27	Supermarket	Panagiotopoulos Bros S.A.
Proton	617	Supermarket	Each store independently owned
Sklavenitis (incl. hypermarkets)	433	Supermarket	Sklavenitis
Spar	33	Supermarket	Spar Hellas franchise with each store independently owned
SYN.KA Super Markets	52	Supermarket	SYN.KA
Thanopoulos	3	Supermarket	Thanopoulos

== Hypermarkets ==
Name	Stores	Type of store	Parent
Grand Masoutis	15	Hypermarket	Diamandis Masoutis
Sklavenitis	33	Hypermarket	Sklavenitis

== Cash and carry ==
Name	Stores	Type of store	Parent
Bazaar Cash and Carry Market	10	Cash and carry	Bazaar SA
ENA	14	Cash and carry	Ahold Delhaize
Galaxias	13	Cash and carry	Pente SA
The Mart	11	Cash and carry	Sklavenitis
Masoutis Cash & Carry	22	Cash and carry	Diamandis Masoutis
Metro	48	Cash and carry	Metro

== Defunct supermarket chains ==
- Aldi - German discounter
- Arvanitidis
- Marinopoulos
  - Carrefour
  - Carrefour Marinopoulos
  - Carrefour Express
- Dia
- Plus - German owned
- Veropoulos
- Atlantik
- Super Market Λάρισα ΑΒΕΕ

== See also ==
- List of supermarket chains in Europe
- List of supermarket chains
