= Sklavenitis =

Greek supermarket chain

Hellenic Hypermarkets Sklavenitis
- Type: Société Anonyme
- Industry: Retail (Grocery)
- Founded: 1954; 72 years ago
- Headquarters: Kifissou Avenue 136, Peristeri, Athens, Greece
- Number of locations: 541 (May 2025)
- Key people: Gerasimos Sklavenitis (CEO)
- Products: Groceries, consumer goods
- Revenue: €5.157.697b (2023)
- Net income: €96,995m (2023)
- Number of employees: 40,318 (May 2025)
- Website: sklavenitis.gr

A hypermarket in Efkarpia, Thessaloniki, approximately 12,057sq.metres

Sklavenitis (Greek: Σκλαβενίτης) is a Greek-owned supermarket chain operating primarily in Greece and Cyprus. As of March 1, 2017, it became the largest retail group in Greece, following the acquisition of Marinopoulos Group, which had previously held the leading position in the market. The company currently operates 459 stores in Greece and 27 in Cyprus, surpassing competitors such as Masoutis and Alfa-Beta Vassilopoulos (a subsidiary of the Ahold Delhaize Group).

== History ==
=== Founding and Early Years ===
Sklavenitis was founded in 1954 by Yiannis Sklavenitis (1924–1993) and Spyros Sklavenitis (1927–2006), beginning as a wholesale business in Ano Petralona, Athens. Shortly after its establishment, the company relocated to a privately owned facility on Kifisou Avenue in Peristeri. In 1967, the company was formally registered as "I. Sklavenitis & Co. General Partnership."

Under the company's initiative, the telephone-order service TELEXYP was created, marking the first phone-based grocery delivery service in Greece. In 1969, Sklavenitis opened its first supermarket in Peristeri. In 1975, their younger brother Nassos Sklavenitis joined the company. That year also saw the expansion outside of Peristeri with a large store opening in the Kaminia district of Piraeus. In 1979, the first central warehouses were inaugurated, covering 4,500 m^{2} and including a packaging facility for rice, sugar, and dry goods.

=== 1990s to 2016 ===
In 1992, the original Peristeri store was renovated, adding a 3,050 m^{2} exhibition space. In 1998, the company launched its first hypermarket in Nea Chalkidona.

During the early 2000s, the company experienced stagnation. In 2006, 95% of the company shares were acquired by the four children of Spyros Sklavenitis. Growth resumed through acquisitions:

- In 2007, acquisition of Papageorgiou AEE
- In 2010, eleven stores from Atlantic
- In 2013, nine stores from Extra, five from Balaskas, and four from Doukas

In December 2013, the company entered the Cretan market by acquiring 60% of the Halkiadakis chain (formerly part of Veropoulos), which operated 38 stores and employed 940 staff. In 2014, new 30,000 m^{2} warehouses were opened in Elefsina. In 2015, the company acquired Makro Hellas, which was rebranded as The Mart.

=== Acquisition of Marinopoulos and Expansion ===
On September 3, 2016, Sklavenitis Group announced the acquisition of Marinopoulos Group after extended negotiations. The acquisition was approved by court on January 16, 2017, and by the Competition Commission on January 26. Until that point, Marinopoulos was the largest supermarket chain in Greece.

On March 1, 2017, Marinopoulos ceased operations, and most of its assets were absorbed by a newly established subsidiary, Hellenic Hypermarkets Sklavenitis S.A., which included all Carrefour Express and Carrefour Marinopoulos stores, excluding those in Northern Greece owned by Karypidis.

In the same year, Sklavenitis also acquired a 55% stake in the Kronos chain, completing the acquisition in 2019.

=== 2020s Developments ===
In 2020, amid the COVID-19 pandemic, the company launched its online supermarket (e-market). In April 2021, it acquired 9 of 11 stores in Ioannina operated by SEP Papadopoulos. At the end of 2022, it purchased 4 stores from the Athens-based Yegos chain (a former ELOMAS member), which were rebranded as Yegos in early 2023. The remaining two stores were sold to Masoutis.

In spring 2023, Sklavenitis acquired all stores of the Thessalian AS Agora chain (formerly part of ELOMAS) located in Larissa and Pieria. That same year, the company opened its first store in Mytilene. Sklavenitis achieved national recognition by ranking 5th on the Forbes 2023 list of top Greek businesses.

In 2024, the group expanded further by acquiring two stores of the Flevaris chain in Rhodes, one store in Asprovalta, and nine stores of the Papantoniou chain in Cyprus.
