= Gandia =

Gandia Gandía
- City and municipality
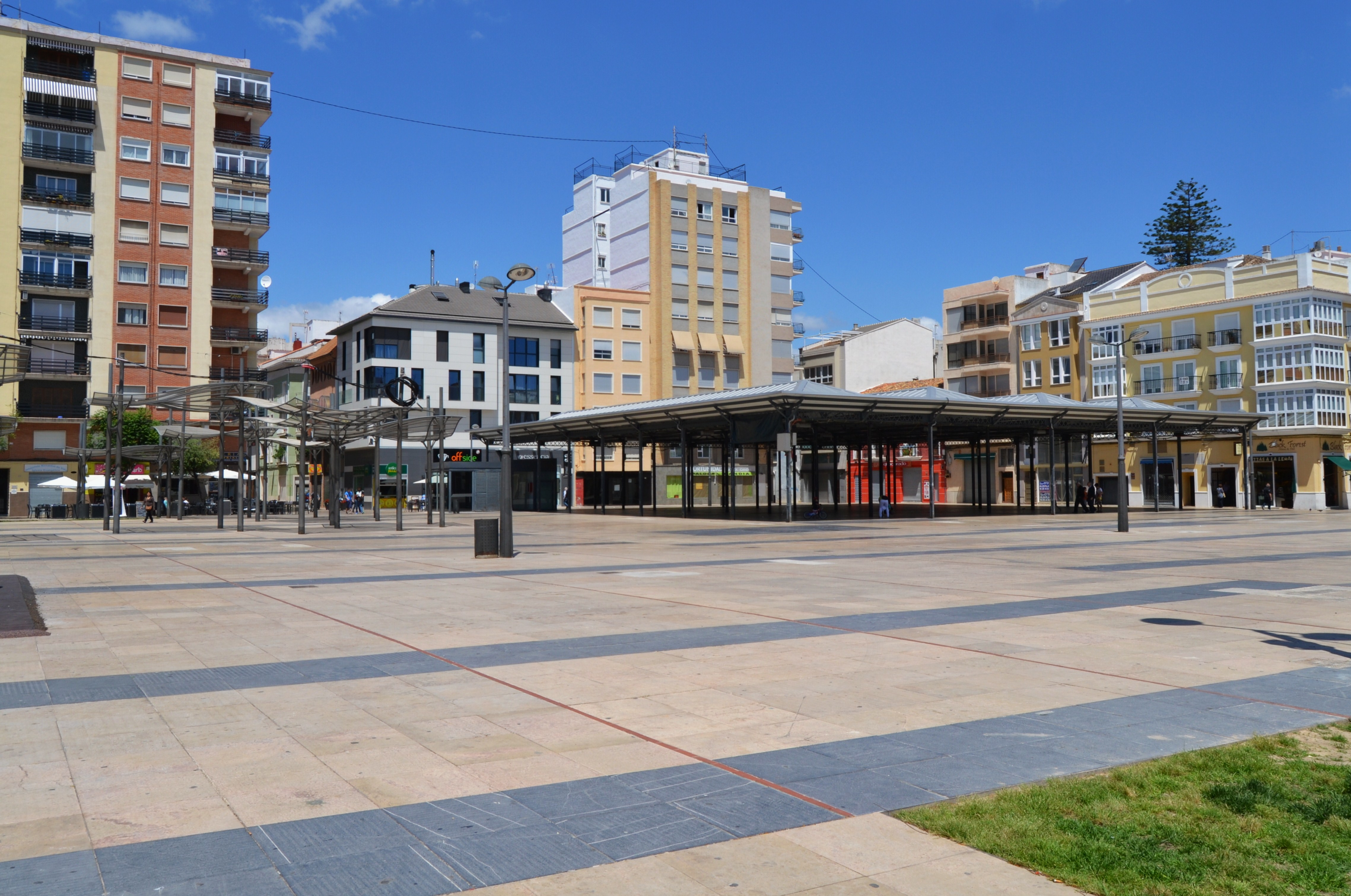
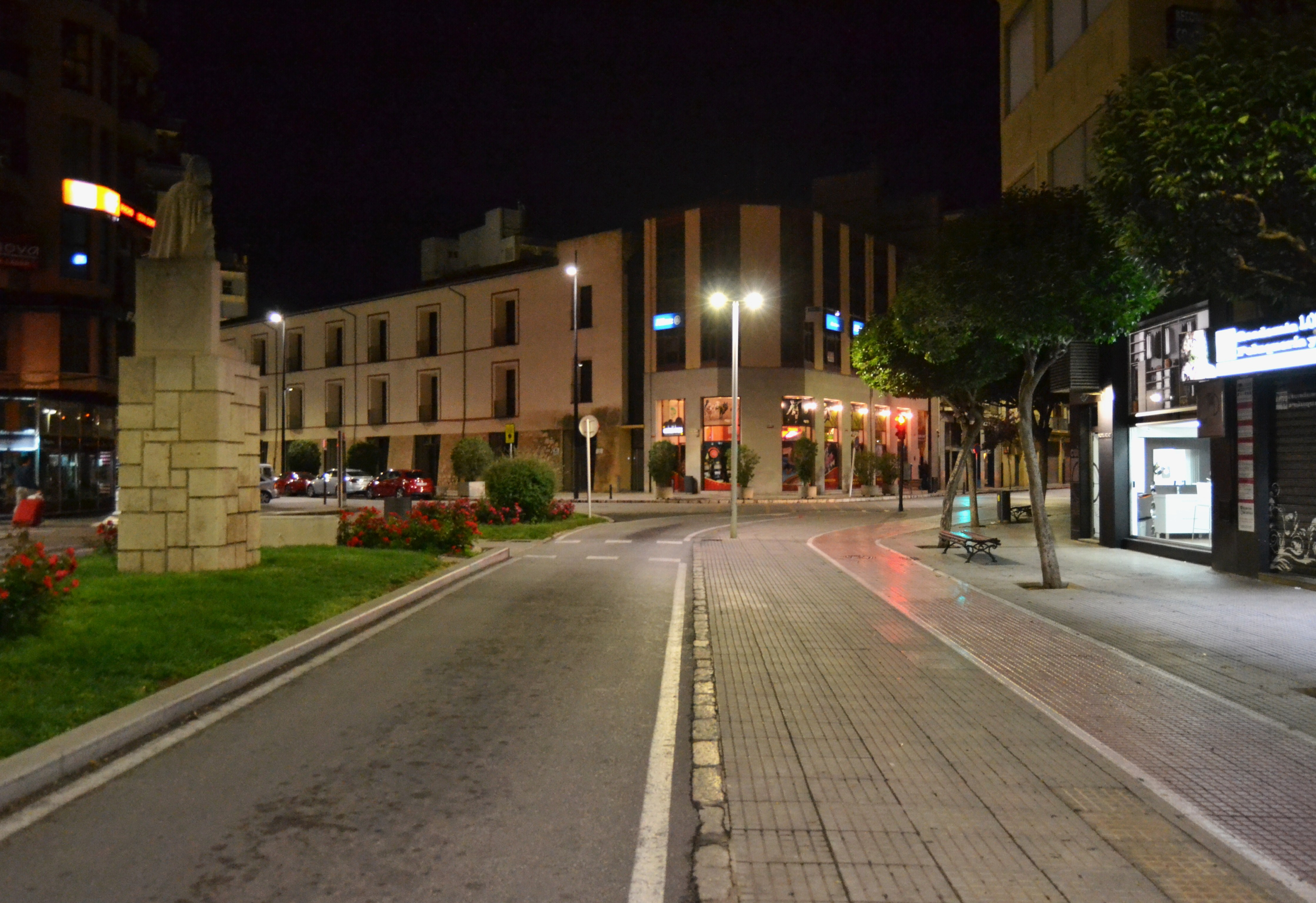
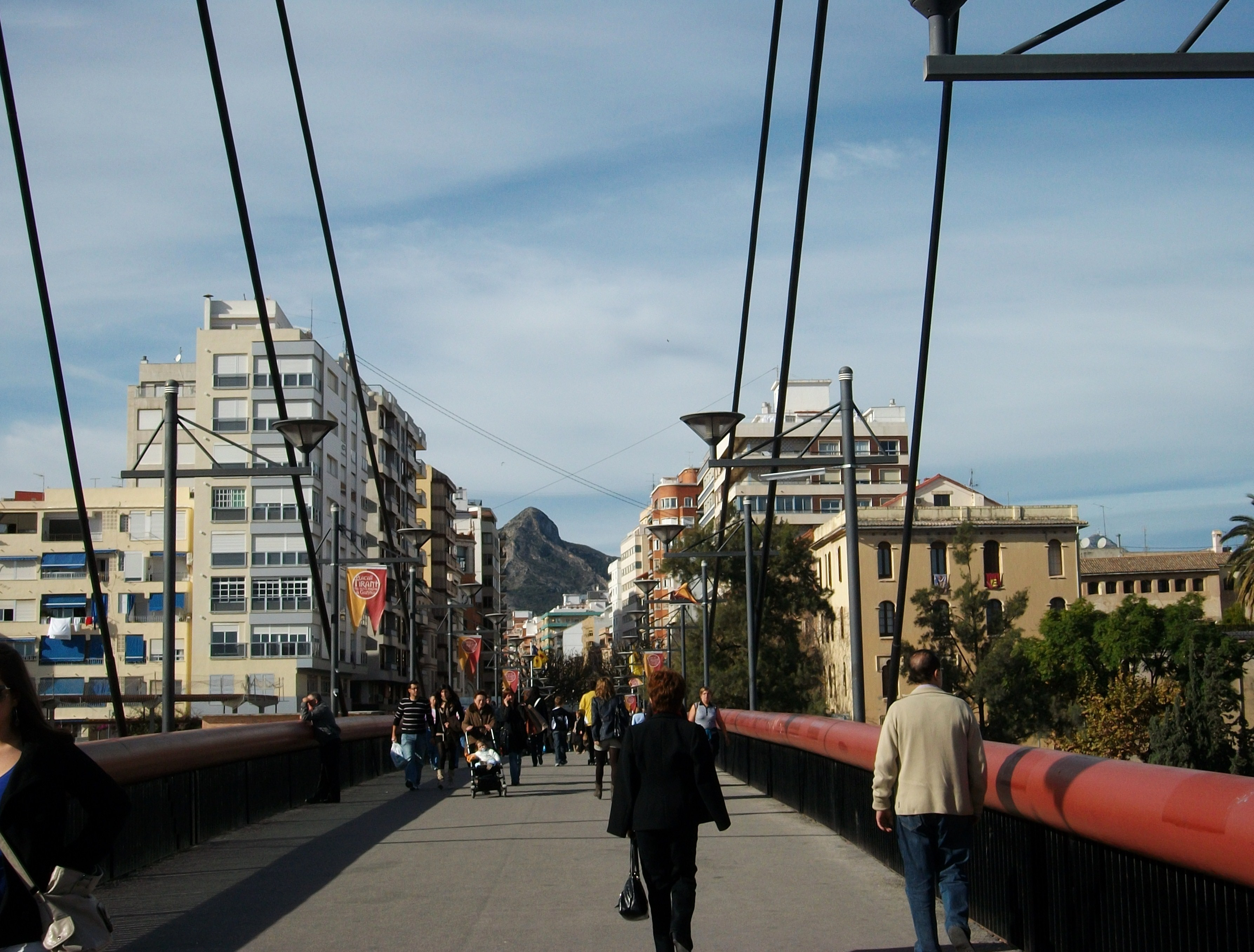
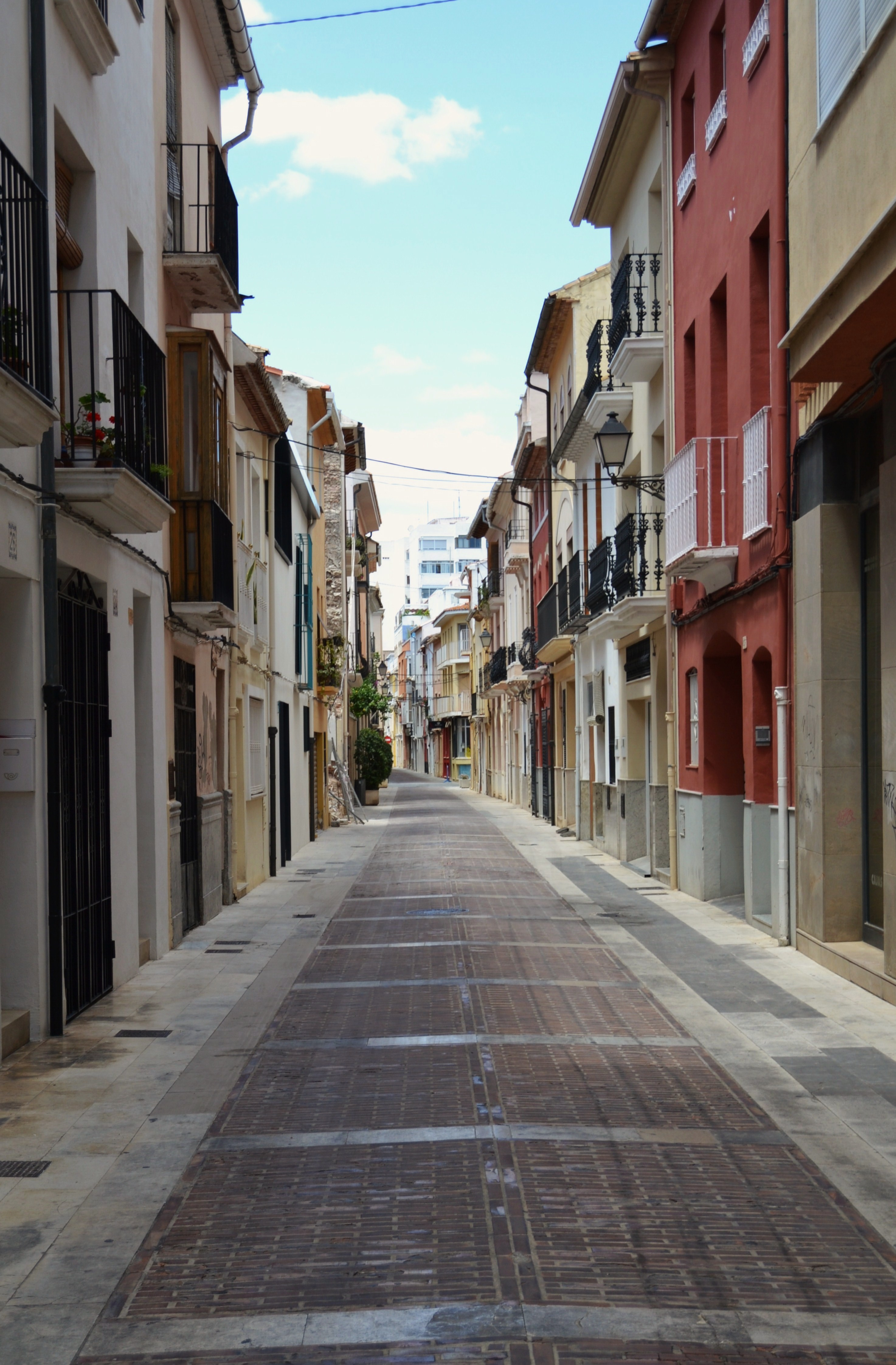
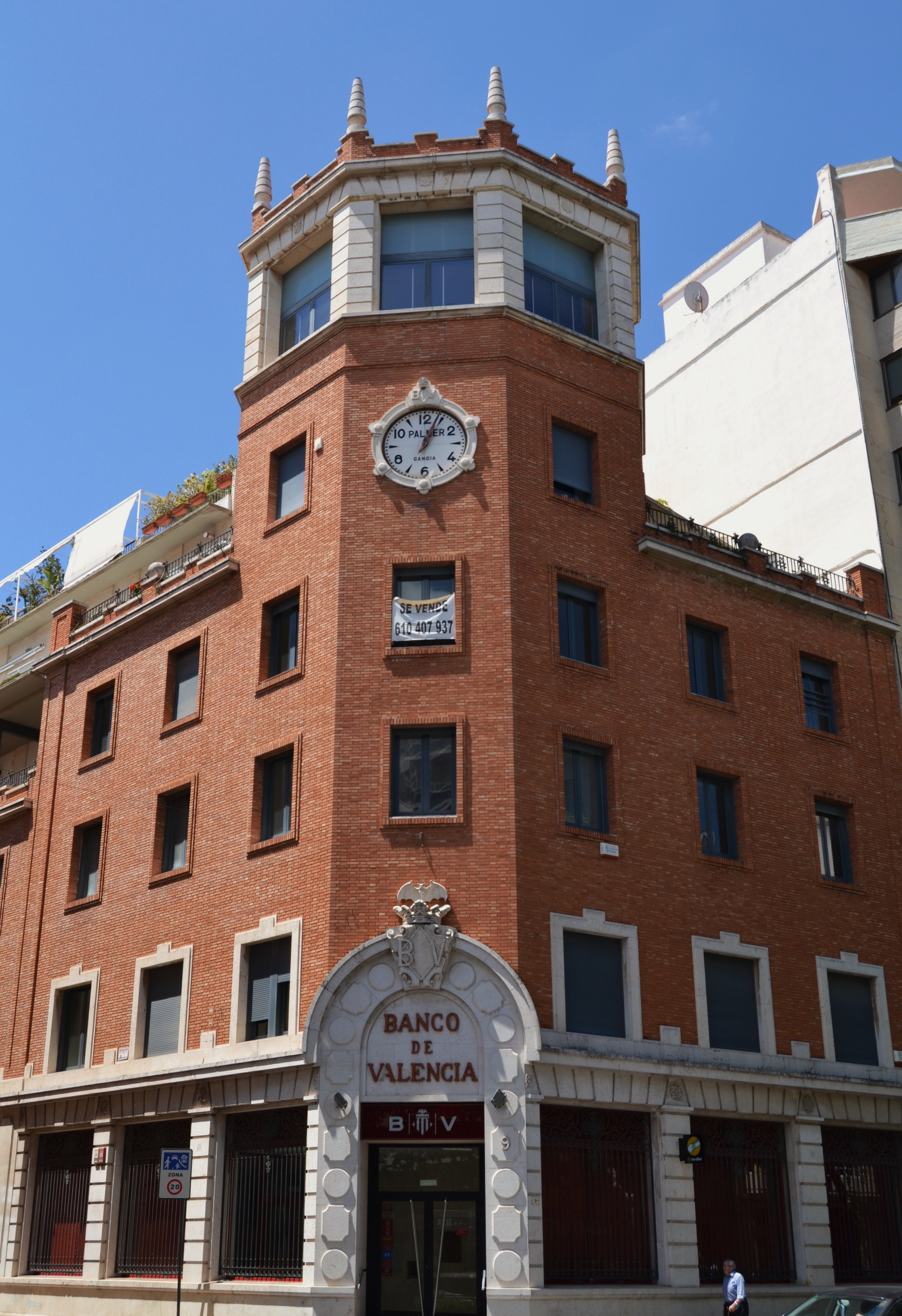
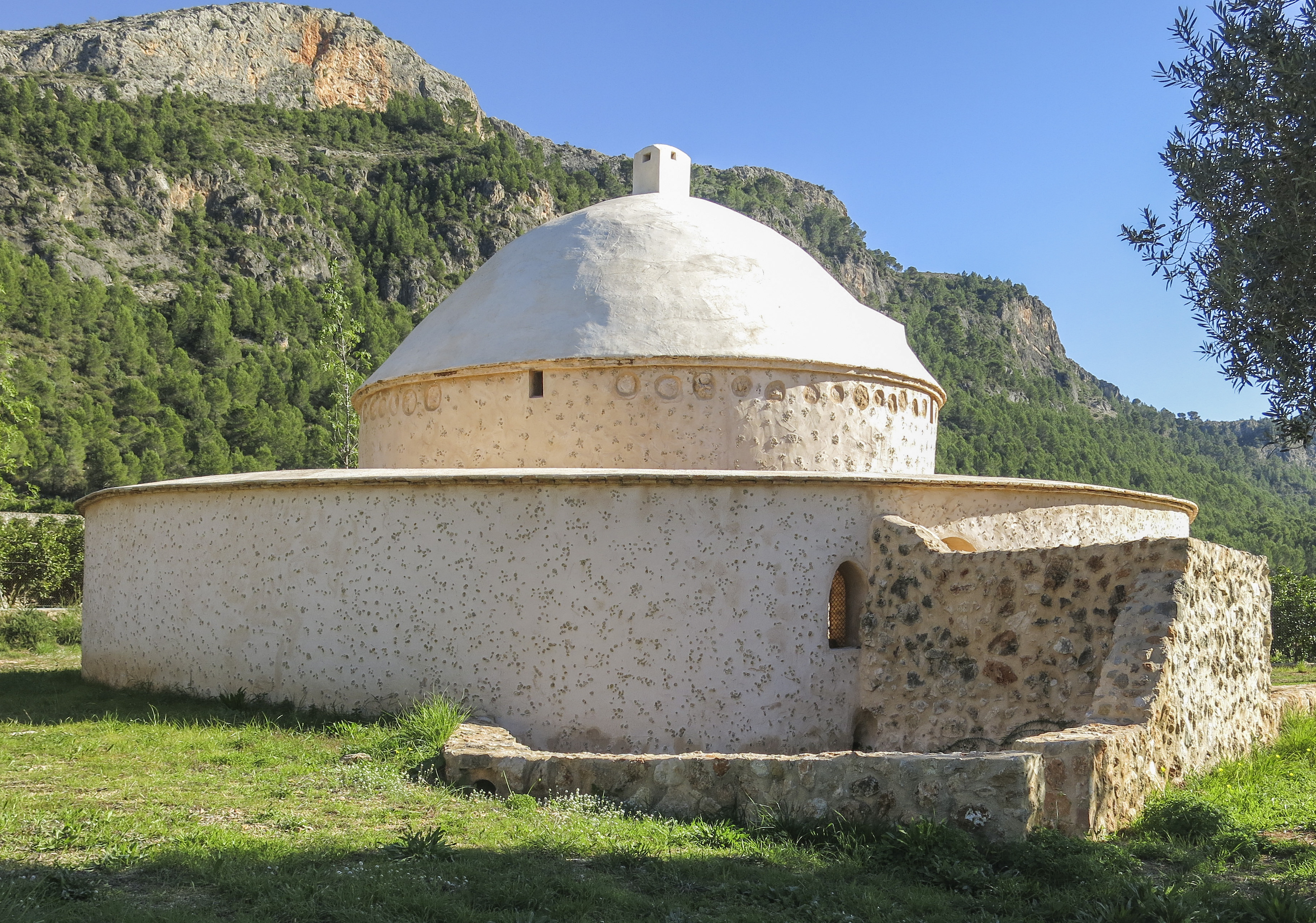

- Flag Coat of arms
- Motto: Sic luceant opera tua
- Interactive map of Gandia
- Location within Province of Valencia Location within Valencian Community Location within Spain
- Coordinates: 38°58′N 0°11′W
- Country: Spain
- Autonomous community: Valencian Community
- Province: Valencia / València
- Comarca: Safor
- Judicial district: Gandia

Government
  - Alcalde (Mayor): José Manuel Prieto (PSPV-PSOE)

Area
  - Total: 60.8 km^{2} (23.5 sq mi)
- Elevation: 22 m (72 ft)

Population (2025-01-01)
  - Total: 83,135
  - Density: 1,370/km^{2} (3,540/sq mi)
- Demonyms: Gandian • gandià, -ana (Val.) • gandiense (Sp.)
- Official language(s): Valencian; Spanish
- Linguistic area: Valencian
- Time zone: UTC+1 (CET)
  - Summer (DST): UTC+2 (CEST)
- Postal code: 46700–46702, 46730
- Website: www.gandia.org

Gandia, (Note: Pronunciation of Gandia: Valencian: [ɡanˈdi.a]) in Valencian, spelled Gandía (Note: Pronunciation of Gandía (unofficial): Spanish: [ɡanˈdi.a]) in Spanish, is a city and municipality in the Valencian Community, eastern Spain on the Mediterranean. Gandia is located on the Costa de Valencia, 65 kilometres (40 mi) south of Valencia and 110 km (68 mi) north of Alicante. Vehicles can access the city through road N-332 and AP-7 highway.

Gandia operated as an important cultural and commercial centre in the 15th and 16th centuries: in the 15th century it had a university. It was home to several important people, including the poet Ausiàs March (1400-1459) and the novelist Joanot Martorell (1410-1465). It is perhaps best known for the Borja or Borgia, through their family title, Duke of Gandia (originally created in 1399).

As of 2020 Gandia is one of the largest coastal towns in Spain, with a population of over 200,000 during summer, and a centre of commerce and tourism in its region. There are two main zones, Gandia City, which has all the historical monuments, commercial activity, and shopping, and Gandia beach, which has apartments and summer residences used during the summer season. The bars and nightclubs are concentrated in the beach area. As is normal for Spain, nightlife does not begin until well after midnight. The beach and town are actually some 2 km (1 mi) apart, which succeeds in separating summer tourism from day-to-day living.

== Culture ==
For culture, there are literary contests, the Summer University (Universitat d'Estiu), the International Festival of Classical Music and art exhibitions; sports include water, golf, tennis and hiking. Gandia hosts the annual Cortoons Gandia animation festival in April, which celebrates international animation and short films.

=== Tourism ===
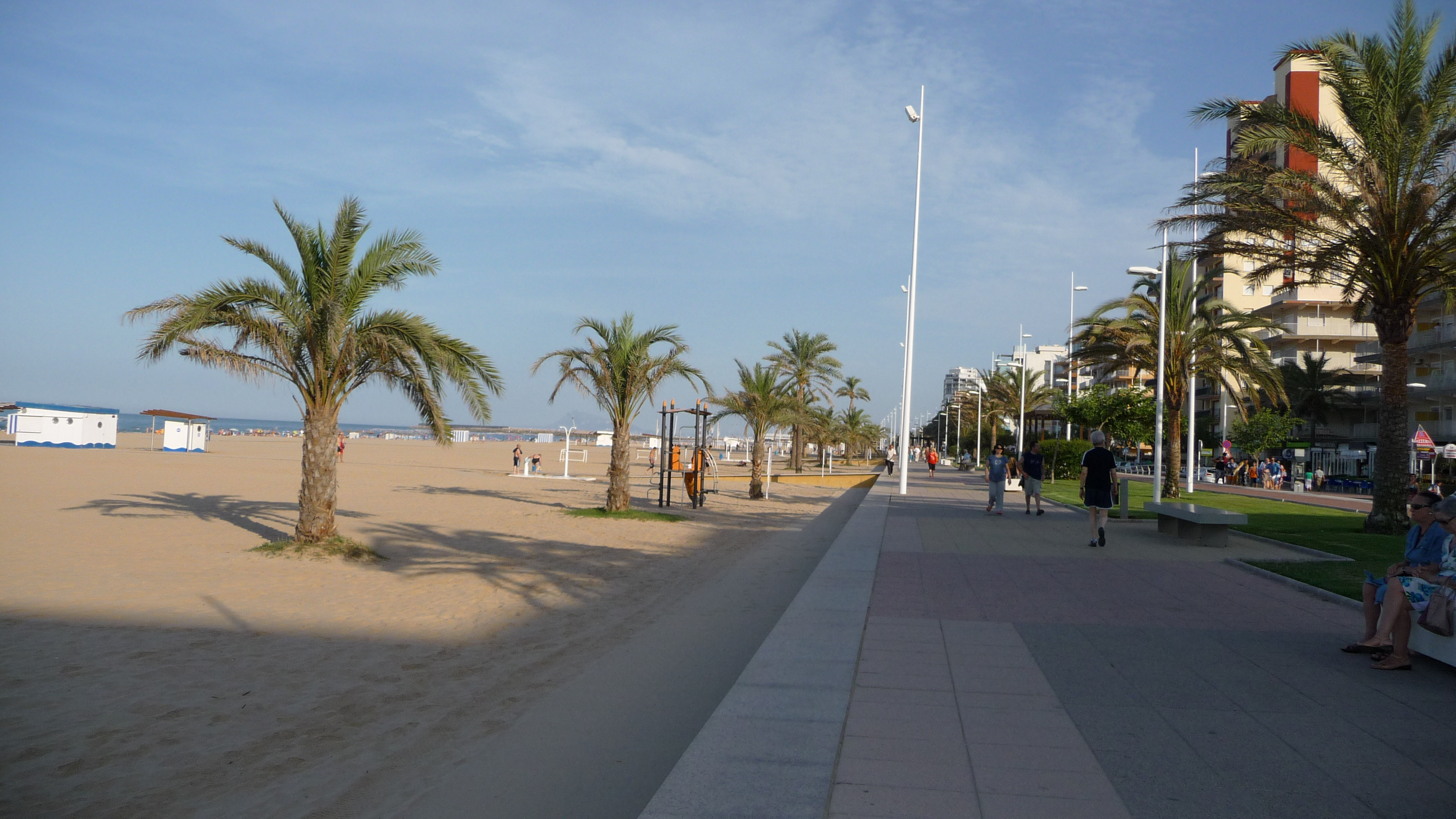
Beach in Gandia

With its long, wide, golden, sandy beaches Gandia is one of the major tourist destinations in Spain. Traditionally Gandia's tourism has a domestic base, with the majority coming from Madrid, although in recent years it has been an increasingly popular destination for international tourists, mainly French, German and British.

There are some popular Spanish restaurants around the beach.

Gandia has a number of shopping facilities including shopping malls and chain supermarkets like Carrefour, Carrefour Express, Lidl, Mercadona and Aldi.

==== Main sights ====
- Collegiate Basilica of Gandia
- Ducal Palace of Gandia
- Convent of Santa Clara of Gandia
- Archaeological Museum of Gandia
- Monastery of Sant Jeroni de Cotalba
- Route of the Borgias
- Route of the Monasteries of Valencia
- Route of the Valencian classics

== Geography ==
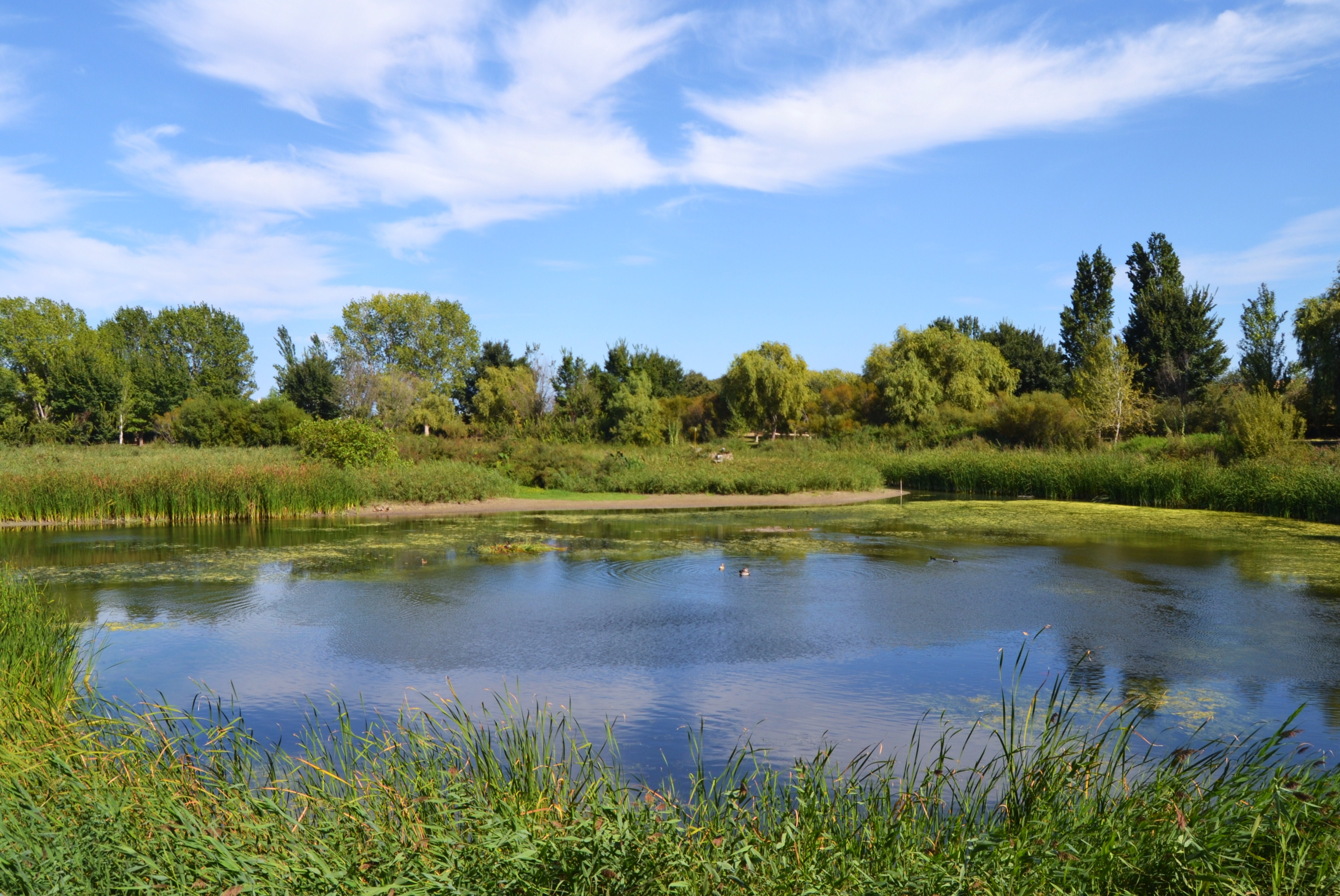
A lake in the marjal

Gandia has an important regional wetland with an extension above 1.2 square kilometres (0.46 sq mi) in the outskirts of the city, called Marjal de La Safor. This natural area is home to several water plants such as Lemna gibba, Lemna minor, and specially many species of water lily plants, such as Nymphaea alba, Utricularia australis and Potamogeton fluitans. Underwater plants also exist, such as Myriophyllum and Ceratophyllum. Native land plants are mostly formed of various Phragmites species, Typha domingensis, various Scirpus and Cladium species.

Various species of palm trees are naturalised in the area, and they are also found widely in the marjal due to seed dispersion, either wind or animal dispersion. The most common naturalised palm trees in the area are Phoenix dactylifera (African date palm), Washingtonia filifera var. robusta (Mexican fan palm) and Phoenix canariensis (Canary Island date palm). There are some specimens of the native palm tree Chamaerops humilis (European palmetto), although very few compared to the naturalised species.

This natural zone is also rich in fauna, with many species of birds, fish, amphibian and reptiles, with some mammal species. The most common species of birds are Tachybaptus ruficollis, Anas platyrhynchos, Falco tinnunculus, Fulica atra and Gallinula chloropus amongst many other species. The most common fish and amphibian species are Cobitis maroccana, Anguilla anguilla, Syngnathus abaster, Bufo bufo, Bufo calamita and Rana perezi.

The most common reptiles are turtles, with a native species (Emys orbicularis) which is in critical condition due to the heavy expansion of the Trachemys scripta scripta and Trachemys scripta elegans, most known as Florida turtles, which are introduced species in Spain. Other species of reptiles are Tarentola mauritanica, Podarcis hispanicus and Natrix maura amongst others.

The most common and native mammals are the European rabbits (Oryctolagus cuniculus), the European hedgehog (Erinaceus europaeus), the greater white-toothed shrew Musaranya comuna (Crocidura russula), the European bat (Pipistrellus pipistrellus) and the wild hog (Sus scrofa) amongst others.

=== Climate ===
The climate of Gandia is Mediterranean (Köppen climate classification: Csa) with mild winters, and hot summers. The annual average temperature is between 18-19 °C. Gandia receives about 600mm of rain per year, the majority falling from September to November. Autumn is the wettest season.

Climate data for Meteorological station of the beach of Gandia, Valencia province, Spain.)
Month	Jan	Feb	Mar	Apr	May	Jun	Jul	Aug	Sep	Oct	Nov	Dec	Year
Record high °C (°F)	29.6 (85.3)	29.8 (85.6)	34.2 (93.6)	32.4 (90.3)	40.4 (104.7)	40 (104)	39.7 (103.5)	40.8 (105.4)	38.3 (100.9)	38.1 (100.6)	33.1 (91.6)	26.1 (79.0)	40.8 (105.4)
Mean daily maximum °C (°F)	19.68 (67.42)	19.03 (66.25)	21.07 (69.93)	23.35 (74.03)	25.57 (78.03)	29.28 (84.70)	32.33 (90.19)	32.05 (89.69)	30.85 (87.53)	28.79 (83.82)	22.32 (72.18)	19.26 (66.67)	25.30 (77.54)
Daily mean °C (°F)	14.37 (57.87)	14.27 (57.69)	15.91 (60.64)	18.30 (64.94)	18.90 (66.02)	23.95 (75.11)	27.03 (80.65)	27.02 (80.64)	25.82 (78.48)	23.17 (73.71)	17.82 (64.08)	13.54 (56.37)	20.01 (68.02)
Mean daily minimum °C (°F)	9.06 (48.31)	9.5 (49.1)	10.77 (51.39)	13.26 (55.87)	14.69 (58.44)	18.63 (65.53)	21.74 (71.13)	21.99 (71.58)	20.8 (69.4)	17.45 (63.41)	13.3 (55.9)	8.09 (46.56)	14.94 (58.88)
Record low °C (°F)	3.1 (37.6)	2.2 (36.0)	3.9 (39.0)	7.7 (45.9)	8.4 (47.1)	14 (57)	17.9 (64.2)	17.3 (63.1)	14.8 (58.6)	7 (45)	4 (39)	2.4 (36.3)	2.2 (36.0)
Average precipitation days	4	3	4	4	4	2	1	1	3	4	4	4	38
Average snowy days	0	0	0	0	0	0	0	0	0	0	0	0	0
Source: The information for the extreme temperatures are for the last 3 years. The rain data are for the nearest station which records rain data to Gandia, because the weather station of Gandia only records temperatures.

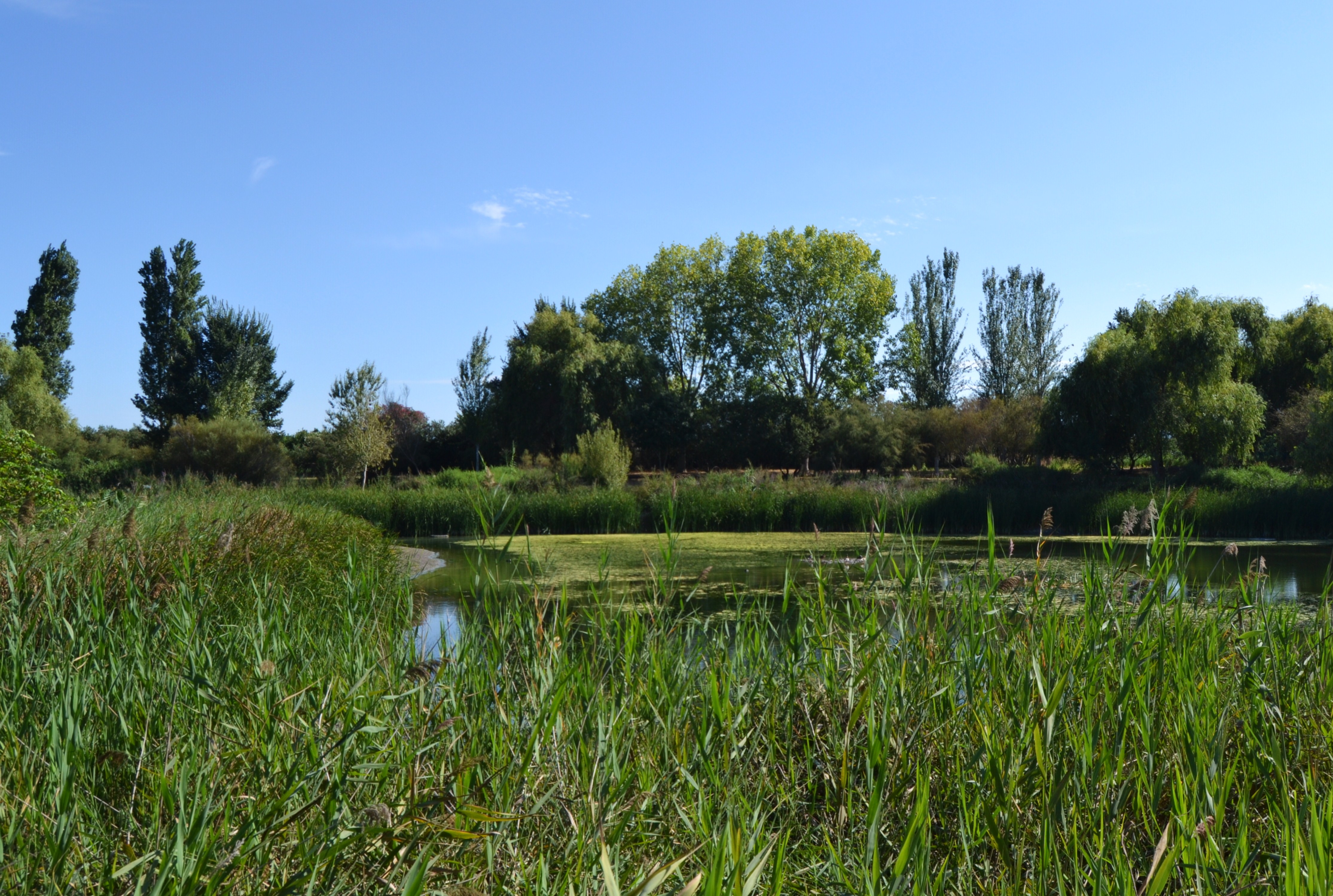
Vegetation with Phragmites

== Sports ==
The local football team is CF Gandía.

== International relations ==
=== Twin towns – Sister cities ===
Gandia is twinned with:

- Laval in France

== Public transport ==
Gandia has an extensive bus network and two Renfe stations that connect the city with Valencia (despite the fact that one of them only has three daily services). Buses in the Gandia area are operated by the company La Marina Gandiense and L'Urbanet. There are two La Marina Gandiense lines: line 1 that connects Gandia with the nearby municipality of Real de Gandia (and sometimes with the University) and line 2, which connects Gandia to the beach, which is 5 km (3,107 miles) away from the city. In L’Urbanet, there are three lines, although one of them is divided, which would be counted as four. The following lines are:

Line 3: Circular. Starts and ends at the Renfe station in Gandia city

Line 4: Gandia train station - San Francisco de Borja hospital

Line 5: This line has the peculiarity that despite being the same line it makes two totally different routes, which are:

- Gandia train station - Marenys de Rafalcaid
- Gandia train station - Marchuquera

There are also bus lines that connect Gandia with nearby villages such as Daimuz, Guardamar de la Safor, Oliva, etc. There are also some buses which connect Gandia with cities such as Madrid, Salamanca, Medina del Campo, Tordesillas, Teruel, Zaragoza, Bilbao, Galicia, Barcelona, Alicante and Andalucía.

Referring to train services, Gandia has two train stations which connect Gandia with Valencia. Both of them are terminal of line C-1 from Cercanías Valencia. The following stations are:

- Gandia
- Platja i Grau de Gandia (this one gives service to Gandia’s beach, causing only three daily trains to reach this station)

== Notable people ==
- León de Arroyal (1755–1813), intellectual, poet, and writer
- Elísabet Benavent (born 1984), romance writer
- Pablo Pallares Marzo (born 1987), footballer
- Diana Morant (born 1980), Spanish politician and Minister of Science and Innovation (2021-present)

== See also ==
- Monastery of Sant Jeroni de Cotalba
- Collegiate Basilica of Gandia
- Ducal Palace of Gandia
- Ferrocarril Alcoy Gandia
- Route of the Borgias
- Route of the Monasteries of Valencia
- Route of the Valencian classics
- List of municipalities in Valencia
