= León de Arroyal =

León de Arroyal (1755–1813) was a Spanish intellectual, poet, and writer, associated with the Salamanca school of eighteenth century literature.

He was born in Gandia, Valencia, in 11 April 1755 and died in Vara de Rey, Cuenca, 1813.

== Works ==
- Odes. Madrid: D. Jehoiachin Ibarra, 1784
- The epigrams. Madrid: D. Joachin Ibarra, printer, 1784.
- Leonido, Ecloga, Madrid, 1794.
- The Scholia Disthicos Caton with Erasmus translated and expanded by Don Leon de Arroyal. Madrid: the Office of D. Geronimo Ortega, 1797
- Los disthicos de Catón con escolios de Erasmo / translated and expanded by Don Leon de Arroyal. Additional to the Fifth Book of Caton disthios. Madrid: office of D. Geronimo Ortega, 1797
- Paraphrased version of the Holy Mass, 1785
- Spanish version of the Little Office of Our Lady, as the Roman breviary. Madrid: D. Joachin Ibarra: will be in house Baylo, 1781
- Paraphrased version of the Little Office of Our Lady, as the Roman breviary. Madrid: D. Jehoiachin Ibarra, 1784
- Spanish version of the office of the deceased, with other prayers, and prayers of the Church according to the Breviary, and Roman Ritual. Madrid: D. Joachin Ibarra, 1783
- Bread and bulls, 1793.
- Cartas político-económicas al Conde de Lerena, 1971.
- Satires (unpublished) next publication should be by Enrique Moral.
