= Carrefour Express =

French multinational grocery store chain owned by Carrefour Group

- Type: Convenience store
- Industry: Retail
- Founded: 2007 (International); 2010 (France)
- Headquarters: Évry, France
- Number of locations: 2,429
- Area served: Europe, Latin America, Asia
- Parent: Carrefour
- Website: express.carrefour.fr

Carrefour Express is a convenience store chain owned and operated by French retailer Carrefour with locations in three continents. Carrefour Express was created in 2007 to consolidate all convenience stores owned by Carrefour worldwide under one name. In 2010, all convenience store operations in France, including Marché Plus, Champion and Shopi were rebranded as Express.

== History ==
In 2007, the Carrefour Express concept was created to replace almost everywhere in the world the convenience stores owned by the Carrefour Group in locations that have small retail areas. These include Champion, Norte, GB, Globi and Gima.

== Operations ==
=== Current markets ===
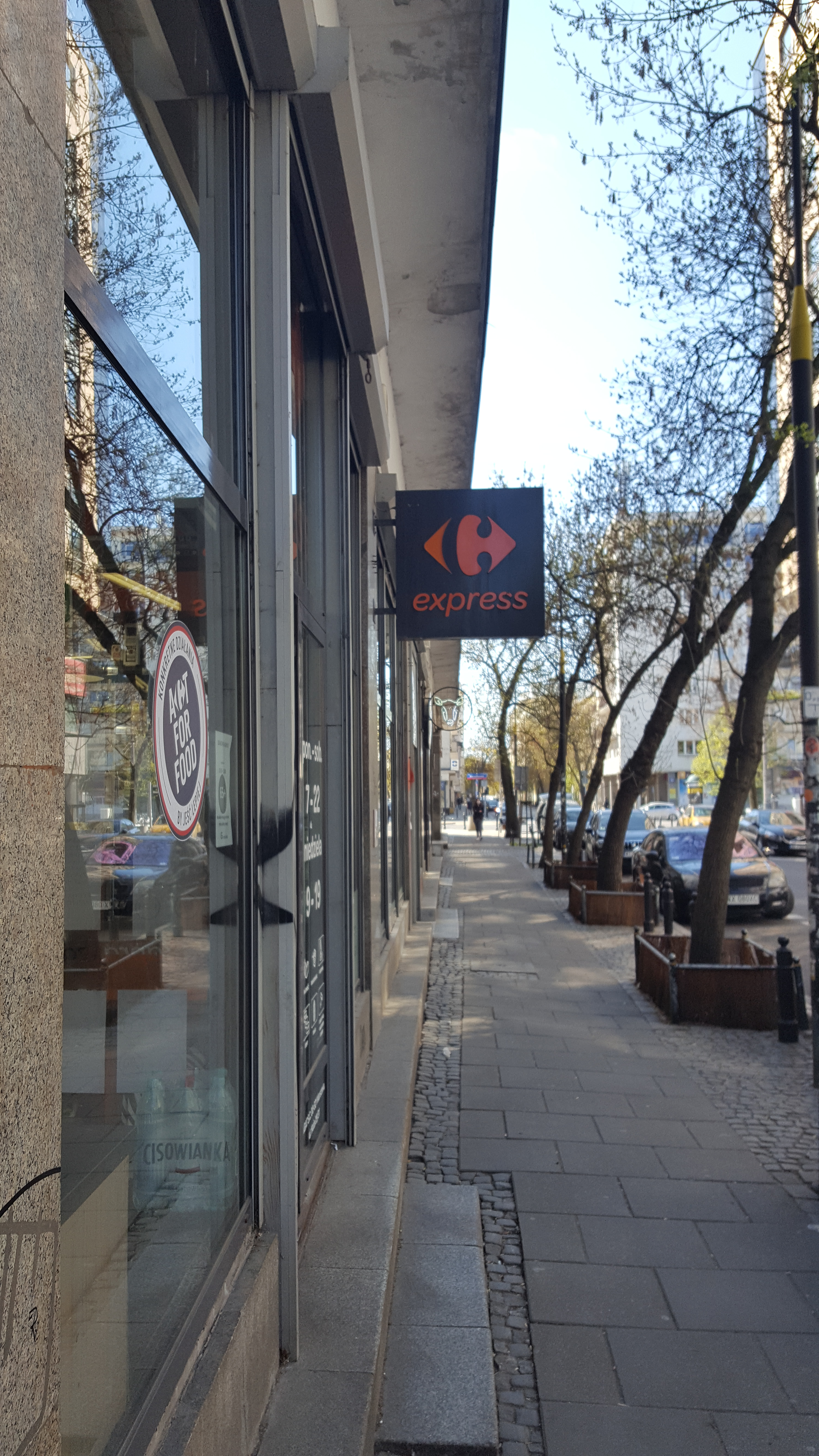
Carrefour Express in Poland

Country	First store	No. of stores	Ref.
Argentina	2007	235	
Belgium	2007	222	
Brazil	2008	133	
Cyprus	2009	4	
France	2010	452	
Italy	2009	591	
Luxembourg	2014	3	
Poland	2007	297	
Romania	2008	56	
Spain	2007	120	
Turkey	2007	189	

==== Belgium ====
Belgian retail chain GB opened its first convenience store, GB Express, in 1997. In 2000 Carrefour acquired GB from the GIB Group. In 2007 all GB Express locations were rebranded as Carrefour Express.

==== France ====
In France, the chain's goal is to replace all convenience stores owned by Carrefour, that could not be converted to either Carrefour City or Carrefour Contact.

In December 2010, the first Carrefour Express was created in Caen, and a second in January 2011 in Poitiers, the third opened in the 5th arrondissement of Paris.

In April 2013, there were 252 Carrefour Express stores in France. In August 2013, 272 stores.

==== Italy ====
In Italy, the chain Dì per Dì was acquired from Promodès in 2007 and starting late 2009, was rebranded Carrefour Express as part of Carrefour's international reorganization.

==== Romania ====
Carrefour entered the Romanian market after acquiring local retail chain Artima for €52 million in October 2007, with the rebranding taking place in September 2008, nearly a year later. As of 30 December 2013, Carrefour operates 56 supermarkets in Romania.

==== Spain ====
In 2007, the first Carrefour Express was created.

In February 2009, the 100th Carrefour Express opened in Spain.

==== Turkey ====
Since September 2007, Carrefour Express also operates in Turkey, locally named "CarrefourSA Express" with only one letter 's' . As of December 2011, there are a total of 189 stores, located in 37 out of the 81 provinces of Turkey.

=== Former markets ===
==== Colombia ====
There were Carrefour Express stores in Bucaramanga, Bogotá and Pasto. After Carrefour's assets in Colombia were sold to Cencosud, all of the Carrefour Express stores in Colombia became Metro Express. (With the stores in Bogotá later rebranding to Spid in 2021, except for Bucaramanga and Pasto)

==== Greece ====
In the spring of 2007, Carrefour Express acquired all "5' Marinopoulos" from Champion Marinopoulos. On 1 March 2017, they left the Greek market after the acquisition of Marinopoulos by Sklavenitis.

==== Indonesia ====
In January 2008, Carrefour Indonesia acquired 75 percent share of local retailer Alfa Supermarket, creating a new supermarket business chain next to the Carrefour hypermarkets in Indonesia. The name "Alfa" was converted to "Carrefour Express". As of 2019, there were only two Carrefour Express stores in Indonesia: one in Kebayoran Lama, South Jakarta and one in Meruya Ilir, West Jakarta. All of these were replaced by the Transmarket brand since 2020. These stores were the first Carrefour supermarkets in Asia.

==== UAE ====
In the summer of 2011, Carrefour MAF began a rebranding and expansion program, with 17 Carrefour express stores across the UAE being converted to Carrefour market outlets.

== See also ==
- Carrefour city
- Champion
