= Marc Berthier =

French designer and architect (1935–2022)

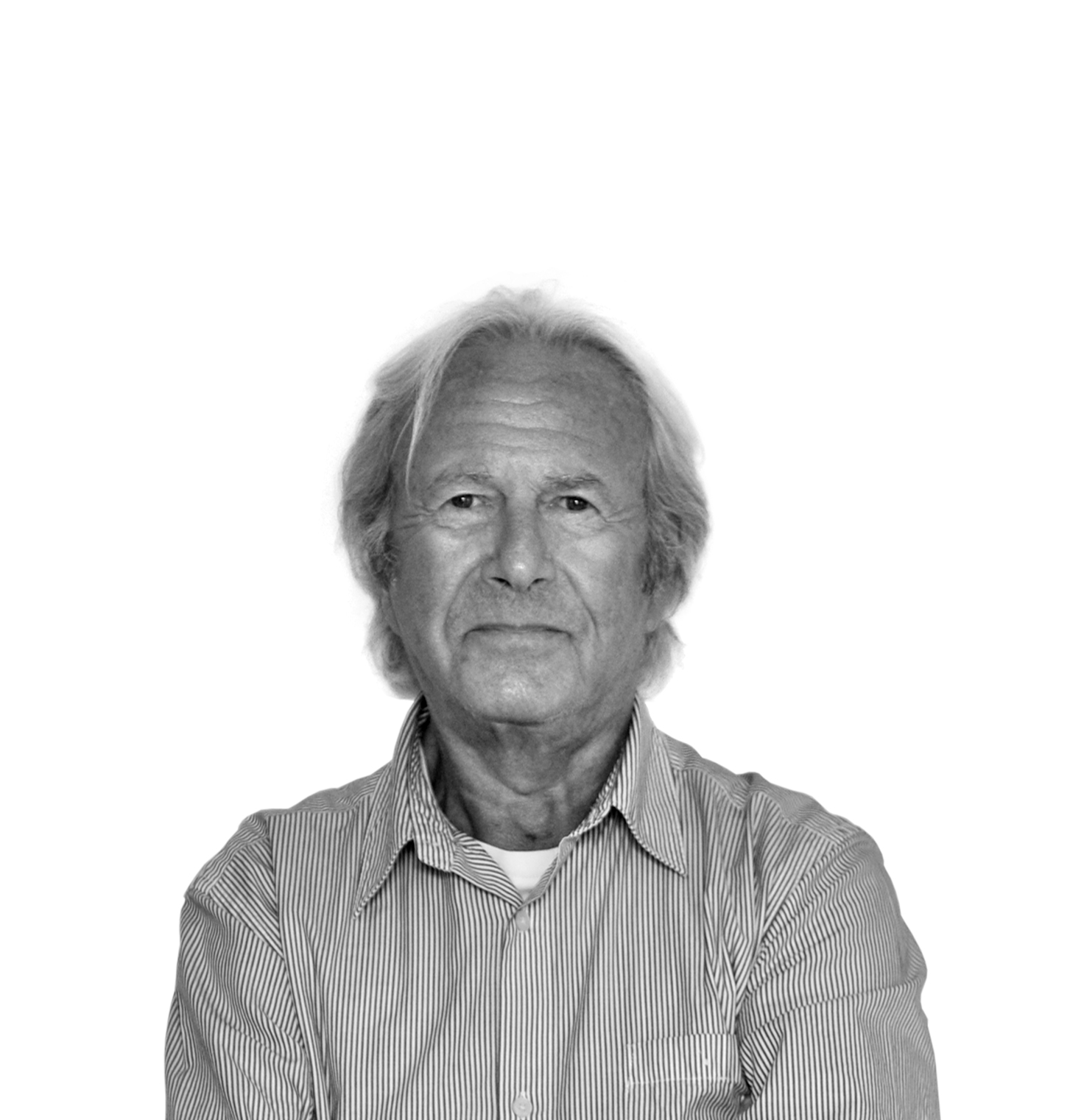
- Berthier in 2016
- Born: 4 August 1935; Compiègne, France
- Died: 3 November 2022 (aged 87); Paris, France
- Education: Beaux-Arts de Paris; École nationale supérieure des arts décoratifs
- Occupations: Designer; Architect

Marc Berthier (4 August 1935 – 3 November 2022) was a French designer and architect. His works have made their way into the permanent collections of museums in France and across the world, such as the Centre Pompidou and the Museum of Modern Art. He was a Knight of the Ordre des Arts et des Lettres and received the Grand prix National de la Création Industrielle from the Ministry of Culture, succeeding Roger Tallon. He directed faculty at the École nationale supérieure de création industrielle from 1985 to 2000 in addition to his work alongside Dimitri Avgoustinos.

Berthier founded and directed the Archi Plan Studio and the Design Plan Studio from 1980 to 1990, and subsequently the eliumstudio from 2000 to 2020.

== Biography ==
=== Education ===
Berthier studied at the Beaux-Arts de Paris and the École nationale supérieure des arts décoratifs (EnsAD), from where he graduated in 1959. At EnsAD, he met the likes of Guy de Rougemont, Patrick Arlet, Jean Lagarrigue, Jean-Paul Goude, and Olivier Mourgue. He also met his wife, Marie-Laure Hermann, whom he married in 1959.

=== 1960s ===
Berthier created Les Ruches in 1965, a system of modular melamine boxes accessorized with colored plastic boxes first distributed at the Galeries Lafayette, where his wife was a manager. It was produced in large part by DF 2000 and appeared in the Prisunic catalog in 1968 and later Roche Bobois. It sold more than one million models and accessories throughout its time on the market.

=== Plastic years ===
During an era in which plastic products were swiftly on the rise, Berthier created the Ozoo furniture collection. It featured a coffee table constructing by a boat manufacturing company in Normandy, distributed by Diffusion d'Ameublement Nordique and sold by Roche Bobois. The Ozoo 600 and Ozoo 700 series are now on display at the Musée des Arts décoratifs, Paris. The minidesk was displayed at the Century of the Child : Growing by Design, 1900 – 2000 exhibition in 2012 at the Museum of Modern Art. In 1968, he produced the exhibition Œil neuf sur la maison, a display which showed multifunctional containers which intended to go beyond their typical purpose.

=== 1970s ===
The oil crises of 1971 and 1973 drove up the price of plastic. This brought about the end of the "Chant du Styrène" and the Le Plastique pour le plastique exhibition at the Centre National d'Art Appliqué Contemporain. Berthier subsequently began using different materials, such as metal and wood. In 1972, he developed Twenty Tube, a set of removable furniture in colored, lacquered metal tubing featuring bunk beds, a cantilever chair and desk, shelves, and a rolling table. The project was launched jointly with the Union des groupements d'achats publics, the Centre de création industrielle, and the Groupe interministériel d'Étude de mobilier scolaire. It was presented at the inauguration of the Centre Pompidou in 1977.

In 1975, Berthier approached international design publishers, such as Knoll in the United States and Magis in Italy. There, he proposed his Aviva collection, solid wood furniture created with only two small sections, with the collection's chair headlining the series.

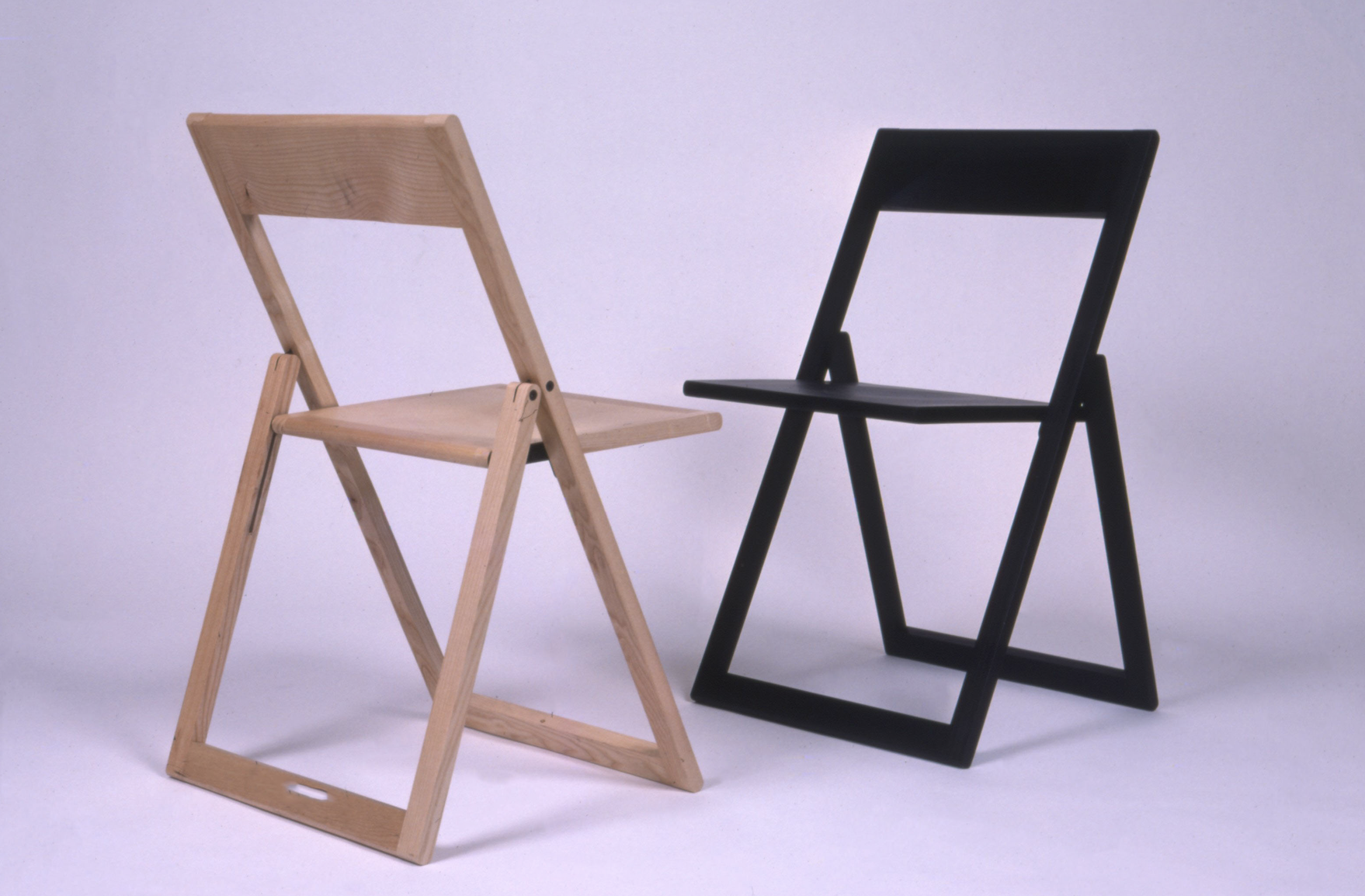
Aviva chairs

=== 1980s ===
Berthier spent most of the 1980s with Magis, notably producing the Magis Chair, made primarily of steel. In 1984, he designed the Jackspot lamp alongside Guillaume Kuhlmann and manufactured by Holight France.

=== 1990s ===
In 1997, Berthier produced the Tykho. It was made of elastomer and acid-colored watercolors and was rectangular in shape. It appeared on the 20 March 2000 edition of Time magazine under the title "The Rebirth of Design" and captioned "Rubber radio by Marc Berthier". He spoke with Le Monde about the radio's design. Produced by Lexon France, it is now in the permanent collection of the Museum of Modern Art.

=== 2000s ===
In 2002, Berthier and his daughter founded the industrial design agency eliumstudio along with his former students, Pierre Garner and Fred Lintz.

=== Death ===
Marc Berthier died in Paris on 3 November 2022, at the age of 87.
