= Prisunic =

French retail chain

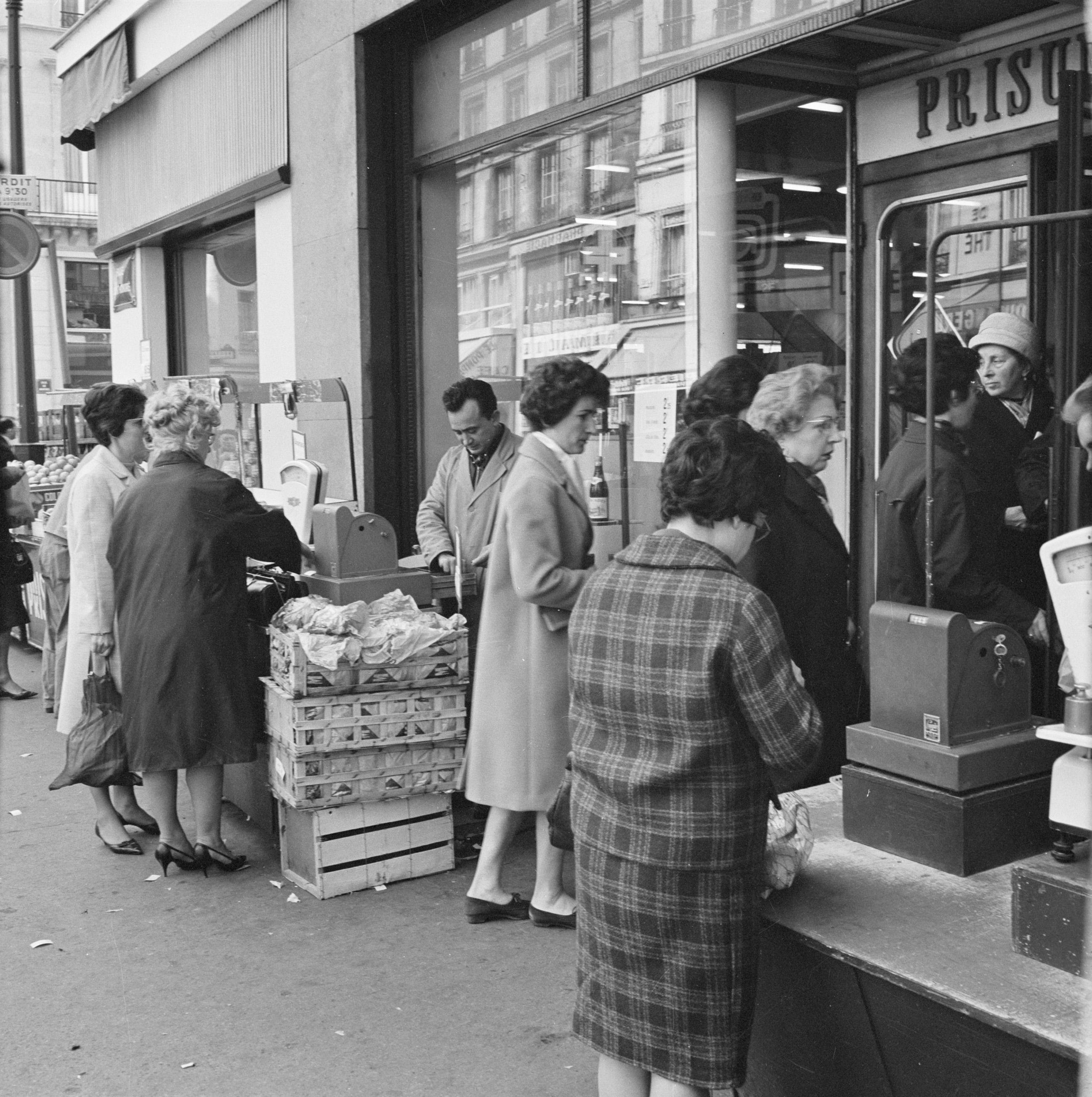
- Prisunic store on rue Saint-Honoré in Paris, in 1965.
- Founded: 1931
- Defunct: 2003
- Area served: France, Andorra, French possessions and colonies and Greece

Prisunic (Société Française des Magasins à Prix Uniques) was a French variety store chain that closed in 2003. Its stores were generally located in downtown areas. Over their existence they also operated stores in Andorra, Greece and the French possessions and colonies.

== History ==
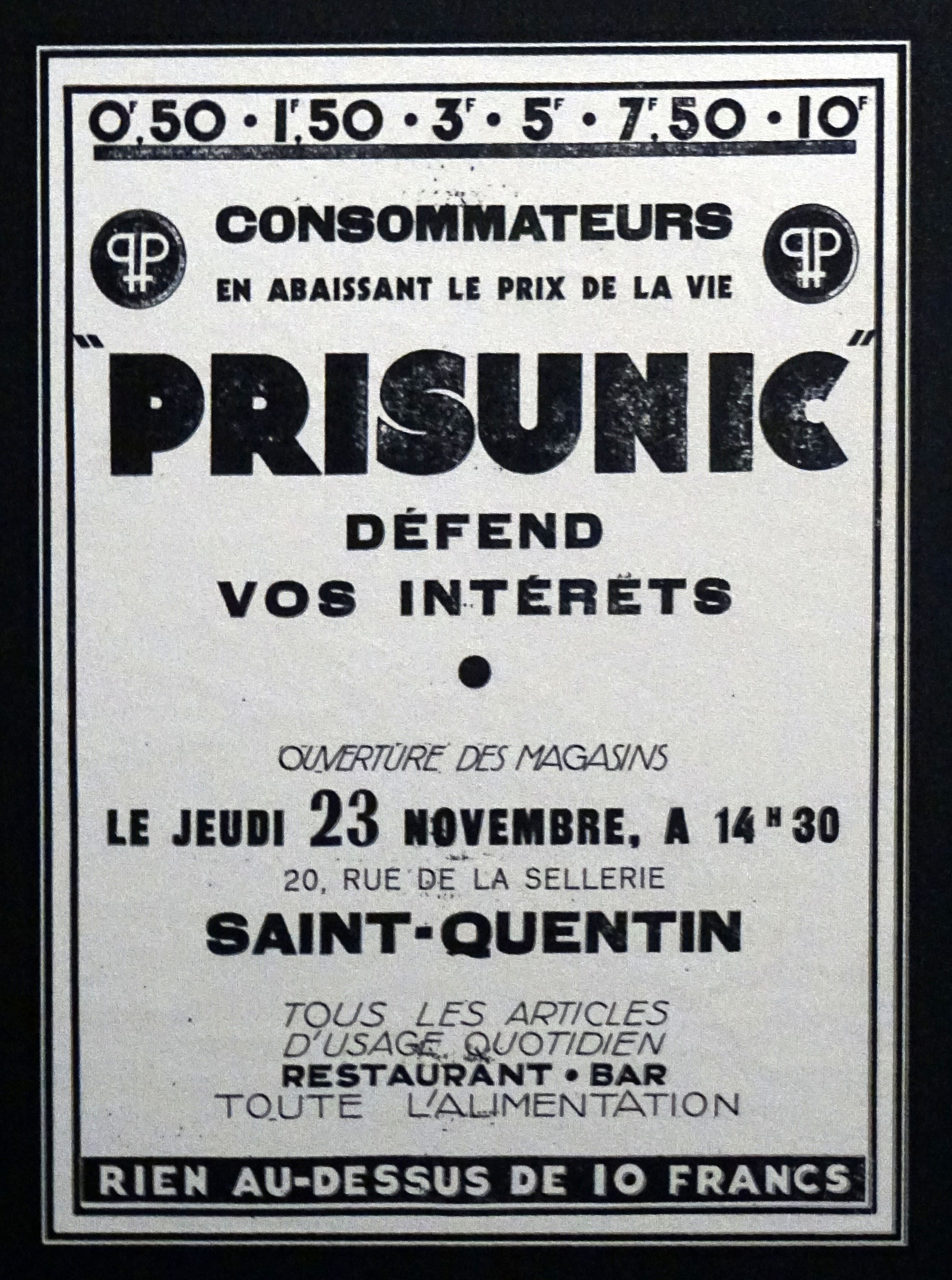
Affiche informant de l'ouverture du magasin Prisunic de Saint-Quentin, en 1933.

The Prisunic stores were founded by Maurice Farhi Pierre Lanuionie, and Henry Reichenbach, however accounts vary as to the exact details. At the end of 1931, Pierre Laguionie, majority shareholder of the Printemps department stores in Paris, created Prisunic chain of stores in order to compete with the Uniprix chain of stores, created in 1928 by the Nouvelles Galeries.

Prisunic aimed to offer a range of "cheap prices for everyday non-food products, with groceries, confectionery and some fresh products". An immediate success, despite political pressure from traditional retailers worried about competition.

Affiliated stores followed. In a precursor to the commercial franchise, affiliated retailers benefited from the name and services of the central purchasing agency, SAPAC, created in 1934.

When Nazi Germany occupied France in 1940, Prisunic CEO Maurice Farhi, who was Jewish, fled with his wife and children to the United States. Jewish shareholders of Prisunic were forced to transfer shares to non-Jewish owners in a series of complex transactions.

In 1958, the designer Andrée Putman became artistic director of Prisunic. In the early 1960s, with the help of Denise Fayolle, the company popularized ready-to-wear clothing, which was then in its infancy in France. In 1965, Jean-Pierre Bailly designed the new Prisunic logo: a flowery target in the center.

In the same year, the long-term collaboration with Marinopoulos began, which lasted until 1991. The first store opened in Alexandras Avenue 106, Athens.

In 1968, Prisunic also started selling furniture, lighting and tableware by catalog, in a contemporary design, with designers such as Terence Conran, Olivier Mourgue, Marc Held, Marc Berthier, or Danielle Quarante.

In 1970, the company had more than 350 stores in France, but in 1977 only 132 were operating.

Monoprix acquired the company in 1997 and at the time they operated 111 stores most of them in Paris and the Parisian suburbs.

The stores, some of which were heavily loss-making, were dismantled and integrated into the Monoprix network of stores. The company was completely dissolved in 2002. The last Prisunic store was closed in Noisy-le-Sec in 2003.

The company's headquarters were located in the Pont-de-Sèvres Towers complex (called Tours Citylights since 2016) overlooking the Pont de Sèvres in Boulogne-Billancourt, not far from the former headquarters of the Renault plants.

=== International stores ===
Over the company's existence international stores were also operated in Andorra, Greece (as Prisunic-Marinopoulos), Algeria, Cameroon, Djibouti, Guadeloupe, Germany, Lebanon, Madagascar, Malaysia, Martinique, Mauritius, Réunion, Singapore, Spain and the UAE to name some.

== In popular culture ==
In France, like the "Renault worker", the "Prisunic cashier" has come to symbolize the typical proletarian in everyday language. The name of the store, Prisunic, is an emblematic example of the French consumer society born of the Trente Glorieuses. The sign is familiarly called "Prisu".

=== In film ===
In the film Antoine et Antoinette, directed by Jacques Becker and released in 1947, Antoinette (Claire Mafféi) is a photo booth employee in the Prisunic on the Champs-Élysées in Paris.

=== In literature ===
Prisunic has been cited in books like Libraire, corps et âmes from the French commentator Dominique Reynié.

Roger Grenier's novel, Ciné-roman, which won the prix Femina in 1972, depicts a woman named Christine who works at Prisunic .

Prisunic is also mentioned in the famous Tintin comic book series.

=== In song ===
The "Prisunic cashier" was mentioned in song lyrics.

In the 1950s, the legendary French actor and singer Bourvil sang a humorous song about Prisunic called En Nourrice, and Juliette Gréco and Lucette Raillat performed a song entitled "The Time of Peanuts" (Le Temps des cacahuètes), written by Claudine Garan:

On courait dans les rues en s'tenant la main,

On dévorait des yeux tous les beaux magasins;
On n'osait pas entrer, sauf dans les "Prisunic"

Où on peut se prom'ner mêm' si on n'est pas chic.

We run down the streets while holding hands,

Our eyes devour the beautiful stores;
We dare not enter any, except for the "Prisunic" chain

Where we can walk around, even if we're not cool.

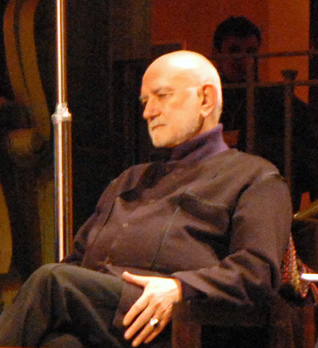
In 1967, Henri Gougaud wrote a song criticizing Prisunic and consumerist society in general.

In 1967 the writer and poet Henri Gougaud wrote a song called "Prisunic" sung by Jean Ferrat, on the album À Santiago, which criticised consumerist society.

Prisunic aux soleils d'aluminium tout gris;

La musique vous prend dans ses douces volutes;
Prisunic Prisunic vos néons sont fleuris;

Paraît que le nylon ça brûle en deux minutes.

In Prisunic the suns are made of bleak gray aluminum;

The music seduces you with its curvy sweetness;
Prisunic Prisunic, your neon signs are all in full blossom;

Looking like nylon that will burn to cinders in two minutes.

Other songs that mention Prisunic include Les Antimémoires, by Bernard Lavilliers, Machine à laver by the French punk rock group Starshooter, On s'ennuie, by Alain Souchon on his Rame album, Musique vieille, written by Gérard Presgurvic, and sung by Patrick Bruel on the l'album De face en 1986, Guitarist, written by Charlélie Couture on the album Solo Boys, Poupée psychédélique by Thierry Hazard, Allongés sous les vagues, on the album Putain de camion, sung by Renaud as well as the humorous parody song by the comedians knowns as the Inconnus, It's You that I Love (C’est toi que je t’aime).

Songs continued to reference Prisunic well into the 2000s, with titles such as The Girl in Prisunic (La Fille au Prisunic), sung by Adrienne Pauly, and The Limiñanas' song entitled simply Prisunic, on their album Malamore.

=== In art ===
The French painter and sculptor Martial Raysse announced during his "Pop" period in the 1970s that the Prisunic are "the new museums of modern art".

In an original and innovative move, at the cultural level, for a chain of so-called "general public" stores, the Prisunic chain sold, in "self-service", between 1967 and 1973, lithographs signed by artists. First of all, through a first edition with creators such as the Belgian painter and engraver Pierre Alechinsky, co-founder of the Cobra artistic movement, as well as the French painter, engraver and sculptor Jean Messagier. Lithographic works by the French-American painter and sculptor Arman, published and sold by Prisunic, can still be found in the auctions.

Following these first sales, a new edition led other artists to participate in this commercial operation called "Suites Prisunic". We can mention Christo, Max Ernst, Asger Jorn and Niki de Saint-Phalle. In 1973, the collector and art critic Jacques Putman, who initiated this operation with the chain of stores, bought the stock of unsold works and then created the Société de diffusion d'œuvres plastiques et multiples (SDOPM).

=== In exhibitions or museum collections ===
==== 1980s ====
From June 15 to August 29, 1988, the Georges Pompidou National Center for Art and Culture in Paris hosted an exhibition entitled "Prisunic, an exhibition of new products"..

This exhibition is presented as an "evocation of the history of the creation of Prisunic stores through the great economic and cultural moments and the actions taken at different times. The exhibition, with a promotional purpose, was linked to the launch of a collection of stationery by the brand.

==== 2000s ====
From September 5 to November 30, 2008, the VIA gallery, located in the 12th arrondissement of Paris, organized an exhibition "Prisunic and Design, a unique adventure" on the occasion of the 40th anniversary of the first mail order catalog published in 1968 by the brand.

From November 22 to 25, 2018, the Design Fair Paris, installed at the Espace Champerret, organized the exhibition "Prisunic - The beautiful at the price of the ugly", taking up a slogan of the brand and bringing together a hundred posters and furniture catalogs of the brand.

The Museum of Decorative Arts in Paris dedicated a space entirely to "Prisunic, a store for daily life "(Prisunic, un magasin au service du quotidien).
