= Carrefour Market =

French multinational supermarket chain owned by Carrefour Group

- Company type: Société par actions simplifiée
- Founded: 15 June 1963
- Founder: familles Deffroey et Fournier
- Headquarters: Évry, France
- Area served: France; Morocco; Argentina; Belgium; Italy; Egypt; Malaysia; Romania; Spain; Turkey; Lebanon; North Macedonia; Kuwait; UAE; Bahrain; Saudi Arabia; Taiwan; Qatar; Georgia; Kenya; Iraq; Armenia; Jordan; Israel; Dominican Republic
- Products: Supermarkets
- Parent: Carrefour Group
- Website: www.carrefour.fr

Carrefour Market is a French supermarket chain created in 2007, owned by the international retail group Carrefour, and has currently stores in France and several other countries, see below.

Carrefour Market stores generally range from 1,000 m^{2} to 4,000 m^{2}.

== History ==
Carrefour Market was created in 2007, to eventually replace the older supermarkets of the Carrefour Group like Champion (Internationally), GB Supermarkets (Belgium) and GS (Italy).

Since 2011, the Carrefour group had decided to deploy Carrefour Market supermarkets internationally.

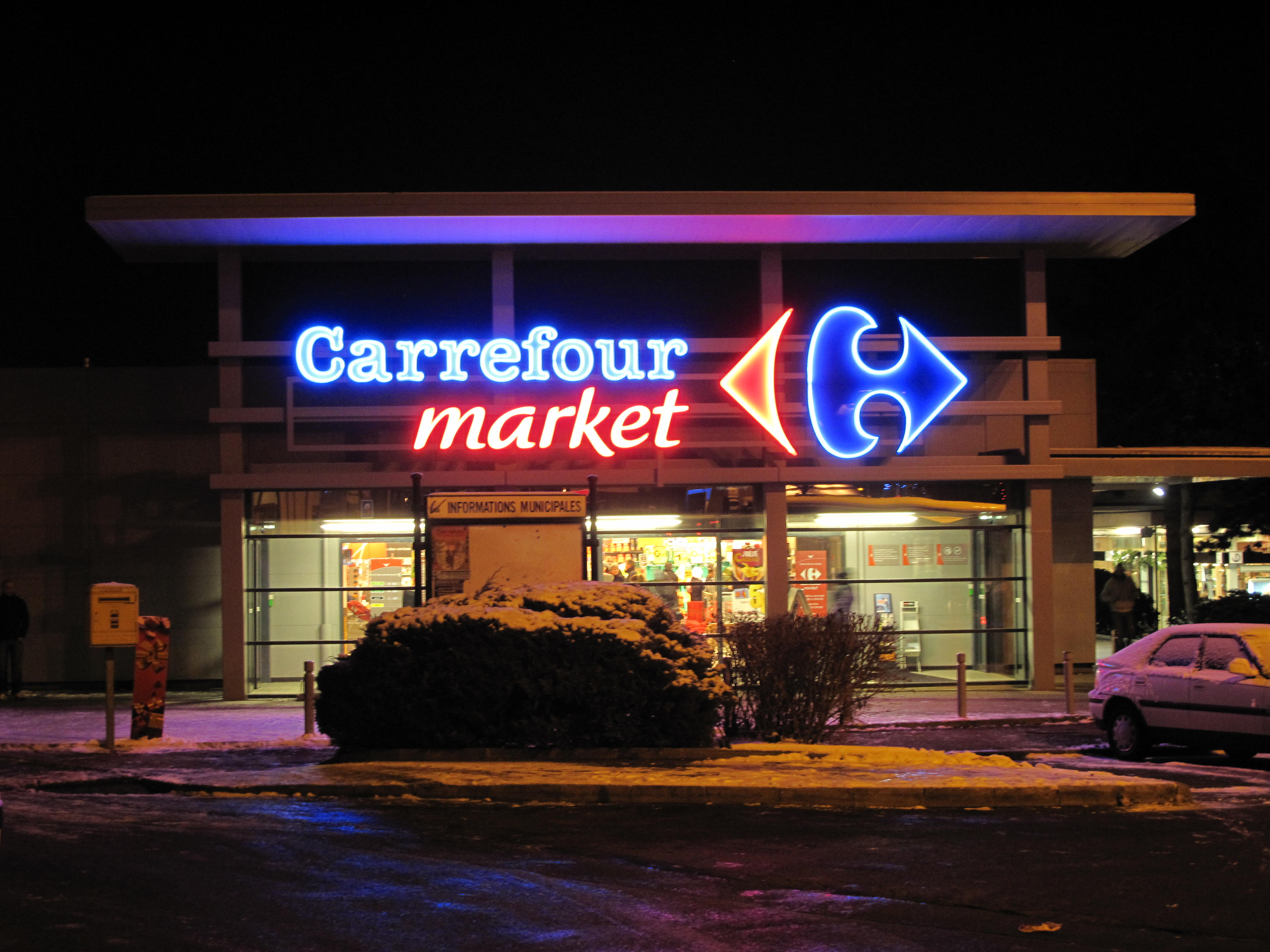
Carrefour market supermarket in Vaires-sur-Marne

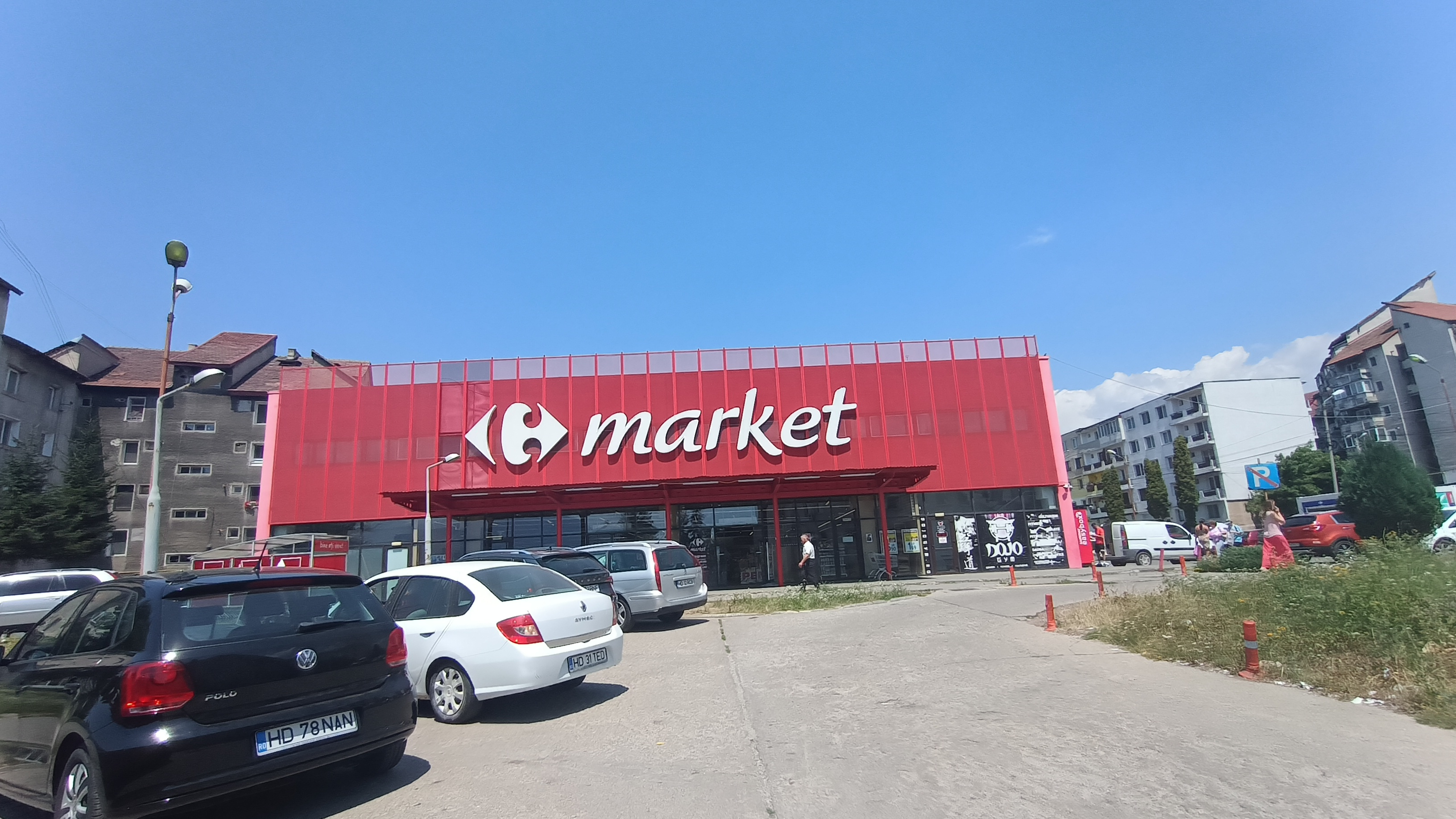
Carrefour Market supermarket in Petroșani

== Carrefour Market around the world ==
- In Belgium, all Carrefour GB and remaining Champion (Wallonia) supermarkets will eventually become a Carrefour Market. As of April 2013, there are 354 Carrefour Market stores, for more info see GB Group and GIB Group.
- In Egypt, the Carrefour Group has 5 Carrefour Market stores in the country.
- In Italy, the first Carrefour Market has opened in November 2008.
- In Malaysia, the first Carrefour Market store was opened in November 2009. All supermarkets were removed as of 2013.
- In Morocco, from 30 July 2011, all Label'Vie supermarkets will become Carrefour Market-Label'Vie.
- In Romania, as of 16 September 2014, there are 81 Carrefour Market stores.
- In Spain, the first Carrefour Express supermarkets were all rebranded and became Carrefour Market in 2011.
- In Taiwan, the first Carrefour Market has opened in July 2009. Wellcome was acquired and merged into Carrefour Market in 2020.
- In Tunisia, all Champion stores became a Carrefour Market.
- In Turkey, from 2010 several supermarkets became Carrefour Market stores.
- In Brazil, from 2017, Carrefour Market was launched in São Paulo as a convenience grocery store chain – similar to Carrefour Contact in France – since there already was the Carrefour Bairro supermarket chain.
- In Kuwait, all Géant easy Supermarkets were acquired by Majid Al Futtaim Group operated Carrefour in 2017 and were rebranded as Carrefour Market. Currently, 6 Carrefour Market stores are present in Kuwait.
- In UAE, Carrefour Market operates across several regions. The Majid Al Futtaim Group operated Carrefour chain acquired 13 Géant easy stores and rebranded the stores as Carrefour Market.
- In Georgia, the Carrefour Group has Carrefour Market stores in the country.
- In Kenya, Carrefour, operated by Majid Al Futtaim Group in Kenya announced The Village Market store will be Carrefour’s sixth store and first Carrefour Market in Kenya.

== See also ==
- Champion
- Carrefour
- GB Supermarkets
