= Bazaar (supermarkets) =

Greek supermarket chain

Bazaar S.A.
- Company type: Anonymi Etairia
- Industry: retail
- Founded: 1994
- Headquarters: Moschato, Greece
- Key people: Georgios Veroukas (Chairman); Demos Veroukas (CEO)
- Revenue: €195 million (2021)
- Website: www.bazaar-online.gr

Bazaar supermarkets is a soft discount supermarket and Cash & Carry chain in Greece. As of 2023, it operates around 191 retail stores all over Greece, including 10 Cash & Carry stores. It belongs to the Veroukas Group A.E.

== See also ==
- List of supermarket chains in Greece
