= Atlantic (supermarkets) =

Greek supermarket chain

Atlantic (Greek: Ατλάντικ) was a large supermarket chain in Greece. Atlantic supermarkets were founded in 1980 by Panayiotis Apostolou. Up to 1985, the company was a small chain with just 5 stores. After 1985, the company expanded rapidly through both organic growth and a number of acquisitions and takeovers. Atlantic was a public company and its shares used to trade in the Athens Stock Exchange from 2000 up to 2010. As of 2006–2007, the company had 182 stores nationwide and was the fifth largest supermarket chain in Greece as measured by market share. The company had also operated a franchise network of smaller stores branded ARISTA. Since 2009, the company had suffered from serious financial difficulties (mainly due to excessive borrowing) and eventually (in 2011) went into liquidation. The company ceased all trading as of 3 August 2011.

== See also ==
- List of supermarket chains in Greece
