= Galaxias (supermarkets) =

Supermarket chain in Greece

Galaxias (Greek: Γαλαξίας) is a supermarket chain in Greece, established in 1982. Its corporate name is PENTE SA and it is headquartered in Athens. As of 2012, Galaxias has 132 stores, approximately half located in the greater Athens area and half in the rest of the country. Galaxias is the tenth biggest supermarket chain in Greece according to market share.

== See also ==
- List of supermarket chains in Greece
