= Marché Plus =

French small format grocery store chain owned by Carrefour Group

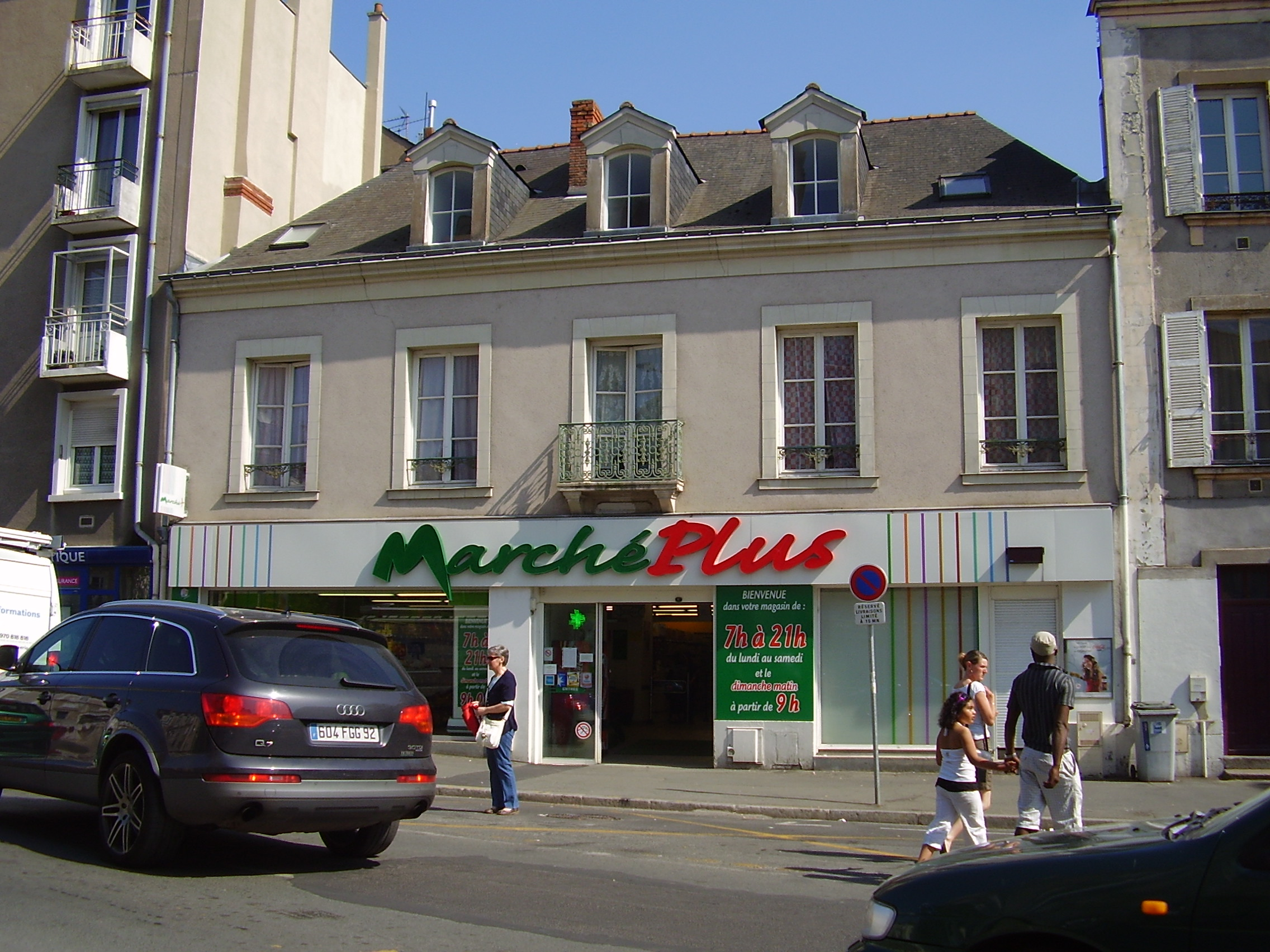
A Marché Plus location in Angers

Marché Plus is a former French superette supermarket chain as of May 11, 2015. It franchised its name to small-format grocery stores in France. It was a part of the Carrefour Group. The head office was in Levallois-Perret. A major rebranding of the corporate groups convenience operations began in 2009. They were consolidated under the Carrefour name and Proxi, finishing by January 2022. Most Marché Plus were renamed Carrefour City by 2015.
