= Marinopoulos Market =

Greek retail company

Marinopoulos S.A.
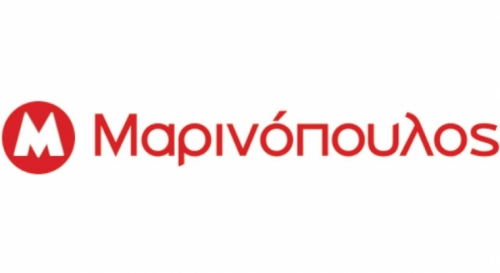
- Company type: Anonymi Etairia
- Industry: Retail
- Founded: 1962; 64 years ago
- Founder: Dimitrios Marinopoulos
- Defunct: March 1, 2017; 9 years ago
- Headquarters: Agiou Dimitriou 63, Alimos, Greece
- Area served: Greece; Cyprus; Albania; Bulgaria; Republic of North Macedonia
- Key people: Panos Marinopoulos
- Products: Super market hypermarkets discount market cash & carry
- Revenue: €2.140 billion (2014)
- Net income: €131.2 million (2014)
- Owner: Greek Supermarkets Sklavenitis (100%)
- Number of employees: 13,998 (2014)
- Website: www.carrefour.gr

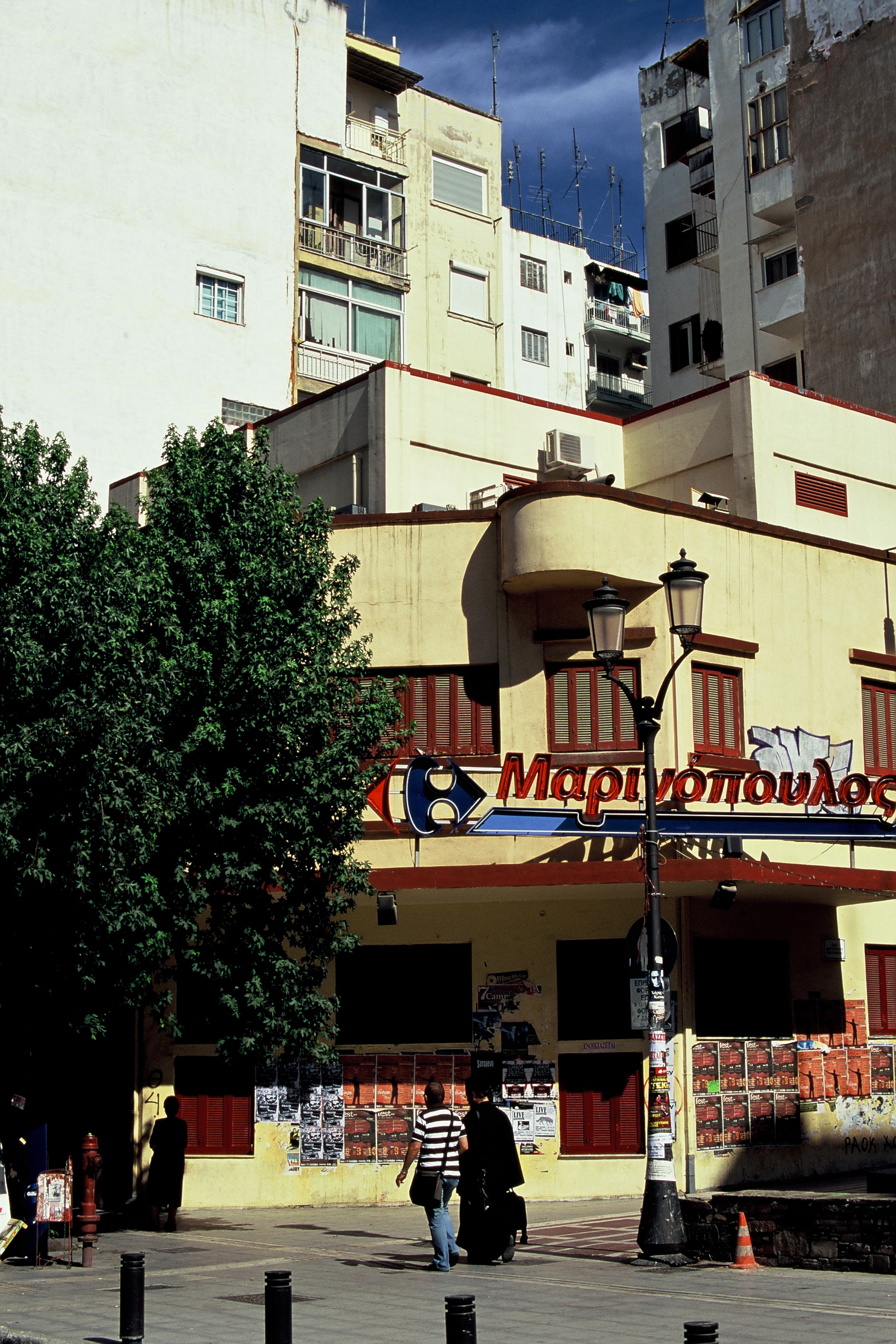
Carrefour Marinopoulos in Thessaloniki (2010)

Marinopoulos S.A. was, for several decades, Greece's largest group of retail and wholesale stores in food, apparel, electronics, and beverages, headquartered in Alimos, Attica. For many years, the company was the country's leading retail group; as of early 2015 it operated 749 stores across Greece—35 under the Carrefour name, 275 Carrefour Marinopoulos, 242 Carrefour Express, 6 Terra Market cash & carry, 93 Smile, and 99 OK Anytime Market—and it was also active in Cyprus. At its peak, it operated a network of 906 stores.

== History ==
The company was founded in 1962 by the Marinopoulos family under the name Self Service Marinopoulos. The family had already established a strong presence in the pharmaceutical industry since 1893, when the first pharmacy opened in Exarchia. In 1948, PHAMAR was established. In 1969, a partnership began with Le Printemps, leading to the rebranding of the company's stores as Orisunic Marinopoulos.

In the early 1970s, the company introduced its iconic mascot, Pi-Mi, depicted embracing the drachma, accompanied by the slogan If you love your drachma!. The partnership ended in 1991 following the dissolution of the French group.

In 1989, Marinopoulos acquired Tresko, the sixth-largest retail group in Greece, and over the following five years expanded operations in Crete through acquisitions of Creta Market, Rethymno Market, Mega Market S.A., and Alfa Mi. In 1992, the company also acquired Paschalidis in Central Macedonia.

In 1993, a partnership was established through Ypermarinopoulos ABETE with Continent Hellas, involving a mutual exchange of 20% shareholdings and introducing the concept of hypermarkets to Greece—stores exceeding 2,000 square meters. The first opened on February 25, 1993, in Pylaia, Thessaloniki, on the site of what is now IKEA, followed by another in early 1996 in Efkarpia.

In 1999, a strategic alliance was formed with the French food retail giant Carrefour, which also assumed the operations of Promodes in Greece, including Continent Hellas S.A. and Dia Hellas S.A. At the same time, Carrefour engaged in negotiations with the owners of the Marinopoulos Group, leading to the establishment of the Carrefour Marinopoulos joint venture, operating under the Champion brand, with equal ownership stakes (50%–50%) between the French and Greek partners. The stores were rebranded as Champion Marinopoulos.

That same year, a joint venture was launched between Tropea Symmetochiki and Carrefour Marinopoulos.

In April 2000, the merger was formalized and the new entity was named Carrefour Marinopoulos S.A., which absorbed the companies Niki S.A., 'Ypermarinopoulos ABETE, Marinopoulos Northern Greece ABETE, Etavik S.A.' and Continent Hellas S.A., Dia Hellas S.A. came under the control of the parent company, Carrefour S.A.

In parallel with their partnership, the French retail group and the Marinopoulos family acquired the Xynos Markets chain in Athens and Leiraikon in Piraeus in 2004, as well as the Laliotis chain in Boeotia and Kronos in Patras in 2014. Notably, Kronos continued to operate under its original brand name.

On June 15, 2012, Carrefour announced its withdrawal from the Greek market, with the Marinopoulos Brothers acquiring its stake in the joint venture. Nevertheless, the company's logos and branding remained present in the Greek market until 2016.

Between late 2008 and February 2009, the Champion Marinopoulos stores were rebranded as Carrefour Marinopoulos in 2010, Dia exited the Greek market.

== Bankruptcy ==
In its final years, the company failed to meet its payment obligations to suppliers, resulting in supply chain disruptions beginning in July 2015. These issues escalated by late August 2015, leading to significant product shortages in stores.

As a result, turnover declined, and on June 28, 2016, the company filed for protection under Article 99 of the Greek Bankruptcy Code, seeking relief from its creditors. The court granted temporary protection on July 1, while scheduling a new hearing for September 29 to decide on the company's formal inclusion under Article 99 and to explore potential measures for its restructuring and recovery.

The Sklavenitis Group expressed interest in acquiring the company. Following several months of negotiations with the company's creditors and the banks, the acquisition of the Marinopoulos Group by Sklavenitis was officially announced. The acquisition was approved by court ruling on January 16, 2017, and by the Hellenic Competition Commission on January 26 of the same year.

On March 1, 2017, the Marinopoulos Group was merged into the newly established company Hellenic Hypermarkets Sklavenitis S.A., a subsidiary of the Sklavenitis Group. This marked the definitive end of Marinopoulos' operations (following Carrefour's earlier exit from the Greek market in 2012). On the same day, all of the group's stores were rebranded under the Sklavenitis name.

== Overview ==
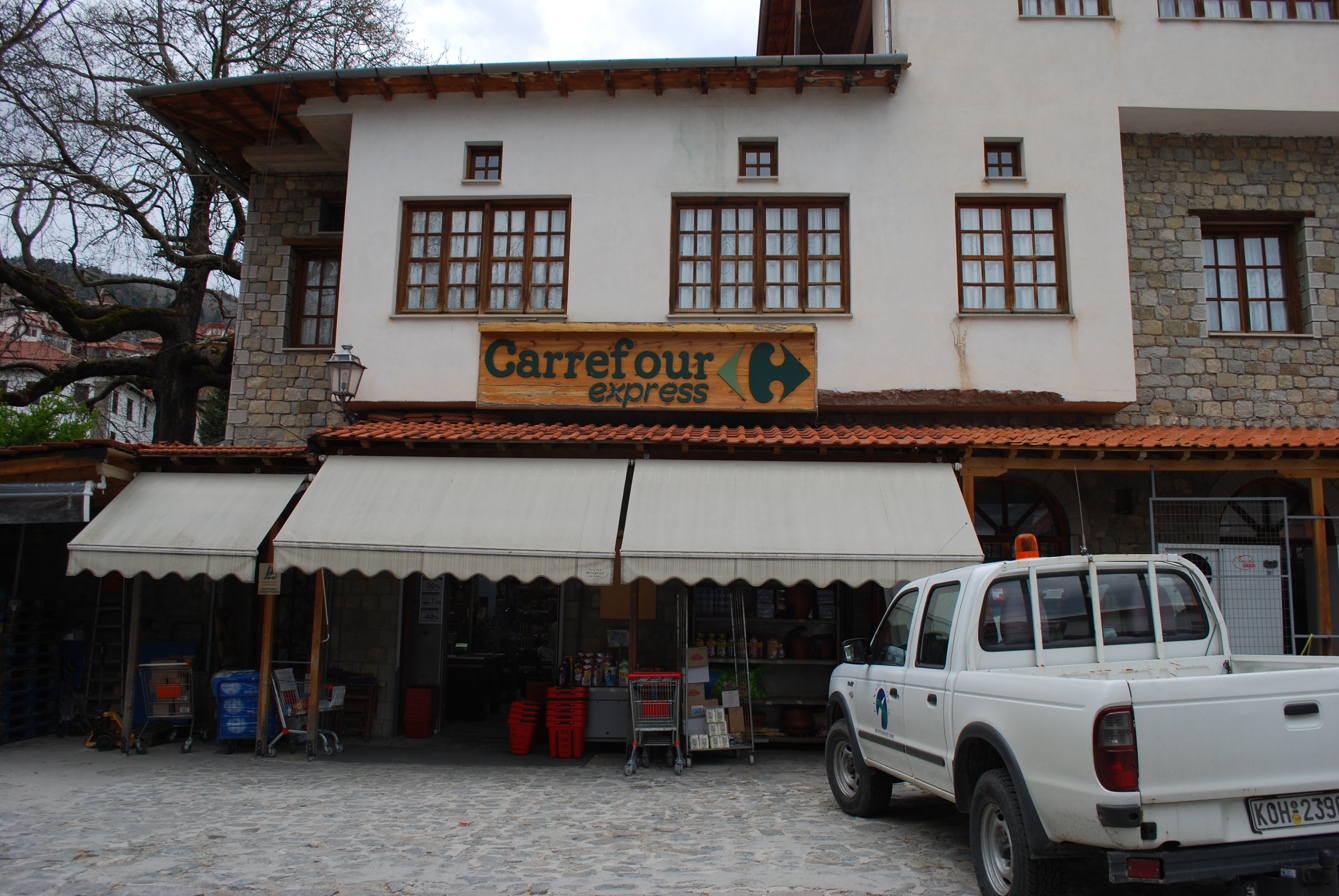
Carrefour Express in Metsovo (2014)

Stores were divided into three formats, differentiated by size and the range of products sold. The larger hypermarkets that stocked a wide range of goods are branded Carrefour. Usually these stores are on two floors, ground floor for mainly food and first floor for clothing, electronics etc. There operated 35 Carrefour hypermarkets located in major Greek cities. Medium-sized supermarkets that stocked groceries plus a much smaller range of non-food items are branded Carrefour Marinopoulos (Formerly Champion Marinopoulos. This name was used up to the end of 2008). It was the most typical store format accounting for almost half of all Carrefour Marinopoulos stores. There operated 276 Marinopoulos stores located all over Greece. Convenience level stores that stocked mainly food are branded Carrefour Express (formerly 5' Marinopoulos) and Smile Market in Thessaloniki. There were over 300 stores of this format located mainly in urban areas. For a few years, operated 3 Carrefour Planet since 2011 to 2013.

Carrefour Marinopoulos also owed 11 hypermarkets (branded Carrefour) and 4 supermarkets (branded Carrefour Express) in Cyprus.

The Carrefour Group and the Marinopoulos Group, through a different joint-venture (Dia Hellas SA), also used to control the Dia hard discount stores located in Greece. However, Dia withdrew from Greek market in 2010.

Until the late 1990s the Marinopoulos super markets were operated as Prisunic-Marinopoulos in cooperation with the 1997 closed French chain Prisunic. The mascot was called ΠιΜί and was on all low cost products.

=== Stores ===
Country	Stores
Greece	906
Bulgaria	22
Albania	19
Cyprus	18
North Macedonia	2

== See also ==
- Carrefour
- Champion
- List of supermarket chains in Greece
