= Super-Markets Arvanitidis =

Greek supermarket chain

- Native name: Greek: Αρβανιτίδης
- Industry: Retail
- Founded: 1950; 76 years ago
- Founder: N. Arvanitidis
- Number of locations: 163 (2012)

Arvanitidis (Greek: Αρβανιτίδης) was a regional Greek supermarket chain situated in northern Greece. The company was established in 1950 by N. Arvanitidis initially as a wholesaler. In 1986 Arvanitidis opened its first supermarket in Veria. As of January 2012, the company has a total of 163 stores, the majority of which are located in northern Greece. Arvanitidis is the second biggest regional grocery retail chain in Greece. The company belongs to the Arvanitidis family. In 2013, a scandal broke out, bringing the retail chain to sell products that were produced in its storehouses under the name of famous brands.

== See also ==
- List of supermarket chains in Greece
