= Veropoulos =

Former Greek retail group

Veropoulos Group
- Company type: Own-company
- Industry: Retail (Grocery)
- Founded: 1973; 53 years ago
- Defunct: 2016; 10 years ago
- Headquarters: Athens, Greece
- Number of locations: 201 (2015)
- Key people: Kostas and Alekos Veropoulos (Founders)
- Products: Groceries, consumer goods
- Number of employees: 6,000 (2011)
- Parent: Metro S.A.

Veropoulos (Greek: Βερόπουλος) was a major Greek retail group founded in 1973 with its first supermarket in Athens. At its peak in 2012, the company operated 185 stores in Greece, 10 in North Macedonia under the brand Vero and six hypermarkets in Serbia as SuperVero. In Crete, it managed stores under the name Chalkiadakis. Veropoulos held the SPAR franchise in Greece until 2016, when financial difficulties led to its acquisition by Metro Group, which rebranded the outlets as My Market. While the Veropoulos name disappeared in Greece, the company continues to operate in North Macedonia as Vero and in Serbia as SuperVero.

The Veropoulos family retained ownership of the company's operations outside Greece. In Serbia, the chain has expanded significantly, with 23 stores, including the largest hypermarket in the Balkans located in Novi Sad. Therefore, while the Veropoulos brand is no longer active in Greece, it remains a significant player in the retail markets of North Macedonia and Serbia.

== Stores ==
Veropoulos stores as of June 2015:

Country	Stores
Greece	185
Serbia	23
North Macedonia	10

== See also ==
- List of supermarket chains in Greece
