= Vara de Rey =

Vara de Rey, Spain
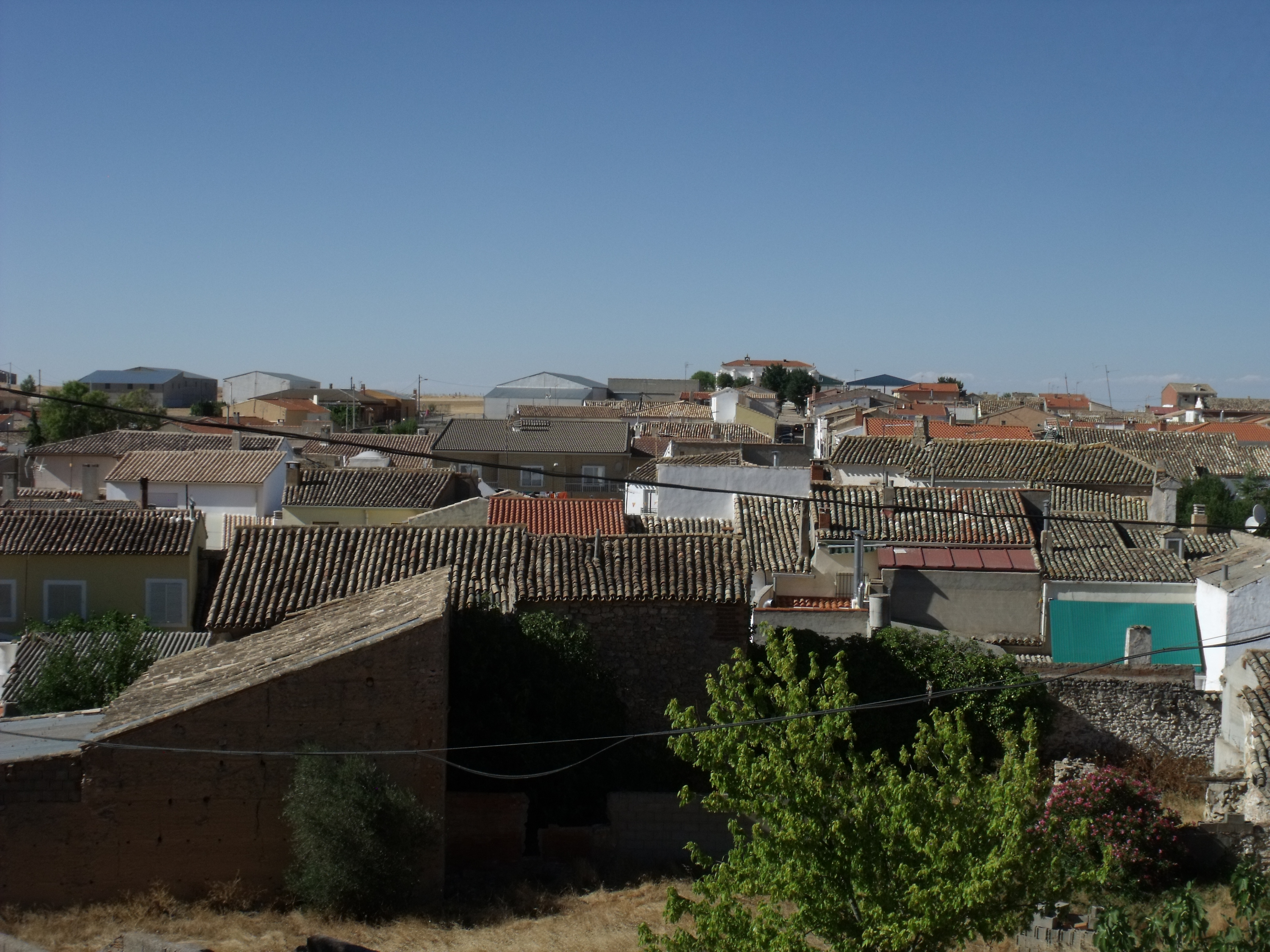
- View of Vara de Rey

- Flag Coat of arms

- Location within Spain Location within Castilla-La Mancha
- Coordinates: 39°25′N 2°17′W
- Country: Spain
- Autonomous community: Castile-La Mancha
- Province: Cuenca
- Municipality: Vara de Rey

Area
  - Total: 128 km^{2} (49 sq mi)

Population (2025-01-01)
  - Total: 466
  - Density: 3.64/km^{2} (9.43/sq mi)
- Time zone: UTC+1 (CET)
  - Summer (DST): UTC+2 (CEST)

Vara de Rey is a municipality located in the province of Cuenca, Castile-La Mancha, Spain. According to the 2004 census (INE), the municipality has a population of 637 inhabitants.
