= Champion (supermarket) =

French supermarket chain

- Company type: Société par actions simplifiée
- Founded: 1969; 57 years ago
- Defunct: 2010; 16 years ago
- Fate: Brand Retired; All Stores Rebranded To Carrefour Market
- Successor: Carrefour Market
- Headquarters: Mondeville (Calvados), France
- Products: Supermarkets
- Parent: Carrefour
- Website: champion.fr

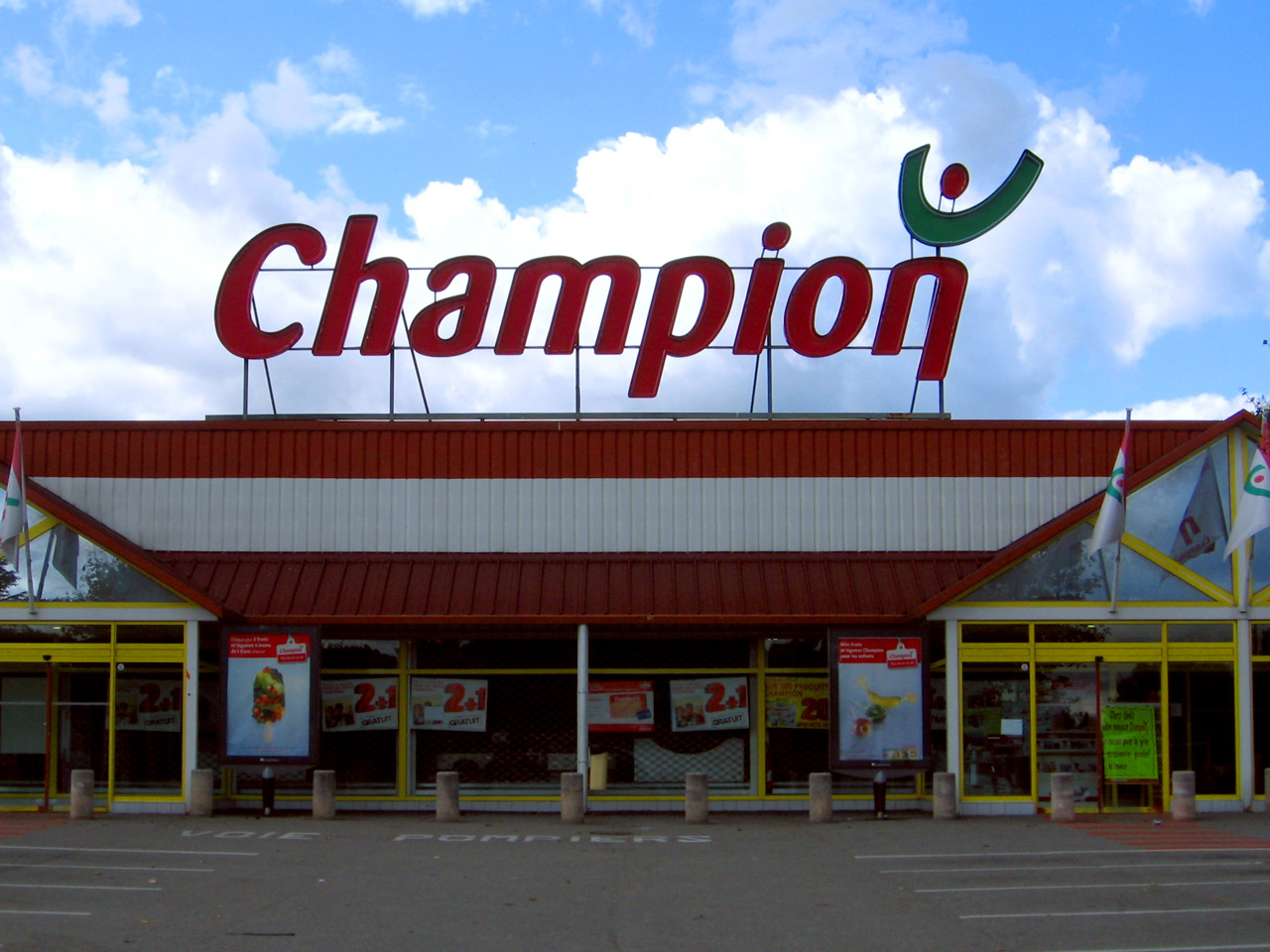
One Champion supermarket in France

Champion (French pronunciation: [ʃɑ̃pjɔ̃]) was a French supermarket chain and owned by the international retailer Carrefour. There were also Champion supermarkets in Belgium, Spain, Poland, Greece, Turkey, Argentina and Brazil. Champion was the second-largest supermarket chain in France in 2008, achieving an annual turnover of €12.2 billion. The chain operated more than 1,000 stores and employed 60,000 people.

In Belgium, the Champion brand was managed by the Mestdagh Group, with most locations situated in Wallonia and the Brussels-Capital Region. Flanders had three Champion locations, specifically in Aarschot, Sint-Truiden, and Tienen.
As of September 2013, all Champion stores were rebranded as Carrefour Market, under the brand name Carrefour Market-Mestdagh Group.

== History ==
In 1993, Champion became the main sponsor of the polka dot jersey in the Tour de France until 2008. From 2009, Carrefour took over the sponsorship.

In 1999, Champion is taken over by the Carrefour Group after the fusion of Promodès and Champion grows by absorbing the Stoc chain.

In 2006, Carrefour closed most Brazilian Champion stores and rebranded the remainder to the Carrefour Bairro. Also, all Spanish and Turkish Champion supermarkets were rebranded as Carrefour Express in 2006; some of them became Maxi DIA.

In 2008, Champion was the second largest supermarket chain in France, its annual turnover was €13.5bn. There were over 1,000 stores and 45,000 employees.

In 2008, it was announced that most stores would be rebranded to Carrefour Market between September 2008 and October 2009.

In 2009, there were 135 supermarkets, in 2011 there were less than 100 stores.

By 2013, only two Champion stores were left in European France (excluding French overseas islands), in Paris (18th arrondissement) and in Pouzac. In 2018, after a legal battle filed against Carrefour was concluded, the last remaining (Paris) store was also rebranded, marking the end of the "Champion" supermarket brand in Europe.

=== Champion in Belgium ===
In Belgium, the Champion stores are owned by Carrefour and Groupe Mestdagh. In 2009, there were 67 Champion stores. From 2013, it was decided by Carrefour that most Champion stores in Belgium would be rebranded as Carrefour Market-Groupe Mestdagh.

As of July 2013, there are 21 stores were left; 7 in Hainaut, 5 in Namur, 4 in Liège, 3 in Walloon Brabant, 1 in Limburg and Luxembourg. The rebranding was complete the following year (2014) when the last single remaining Champion store in Wallonia was renamed Carrefour.

== See also ==
- Carrefour Marinopoulos
- Carrefour
- Carrefour Market
- GB Group
