= G'market =

Romanian supermarket chain

G'market was a supermarket chain in Romania that was previously named Gima. Owned by GimRom Holding (part of FIBA Holding, from Turkey), it mainly operated stores in Bucharest and Iaşi. As of October 2011, G'market stores in Bucharest were bought by Mega Image and stores in Iaşi will be remodeled into Carrefour Market.
