= Carrefour City =

French multinational convenience store chain owned by Carrefour Group

- Company type: Société par actions simplifiée
- Founded: 2009
- Headquarters: Évry, France
- Number of locations: 8,954
- Area served: France; Spain; United Arab Emirates; Belgium; Israel
- Services: Convenience store
- Revenue: $27.3 billion (2022)
- Number of employees: 200,000 (2022)
- Parent: Carrefour Group
- Website: carrefour.fr

Carrefour City is a French chain of local convenience stores created in 2009 by the Carrefour Group with locations in five countries: France, Belgium, Spain, UAE and Israel.

Carrefour City stores are convenience stores in city centers, all of these stores are open six days a week.

== History ==
In January 2009, the first City stores opened in Paris, Nîmes and Avignon.

At the end of 2009, the Carrefour group decided to transform about 50 Shopi (also owned by Carrefour) proximity supermarkets into Carrefour City, the Shopi chain could eventually be replaced completely.

In December 2010, Carrefour announced two new proximity store concepts in France, Carrefour Express and Carrefour City Café, the latter being a Carrefour City store with an in-house café.

Carrefour City have also expanded to Spain with currently 11 stores in Madrid only.

In March 2020, Carrefour unveiled Mobimart, UAE's first grocery bus. This concept aims to bring fresh food and supplies to under-serviced neighborhoods across the region.

In May 2023, Carrefour opened in Israel with a total of 50 stores including some of them being Carrefour City shops.

== Operations ==
=== Current store formats ===
==== Carrefour City ====
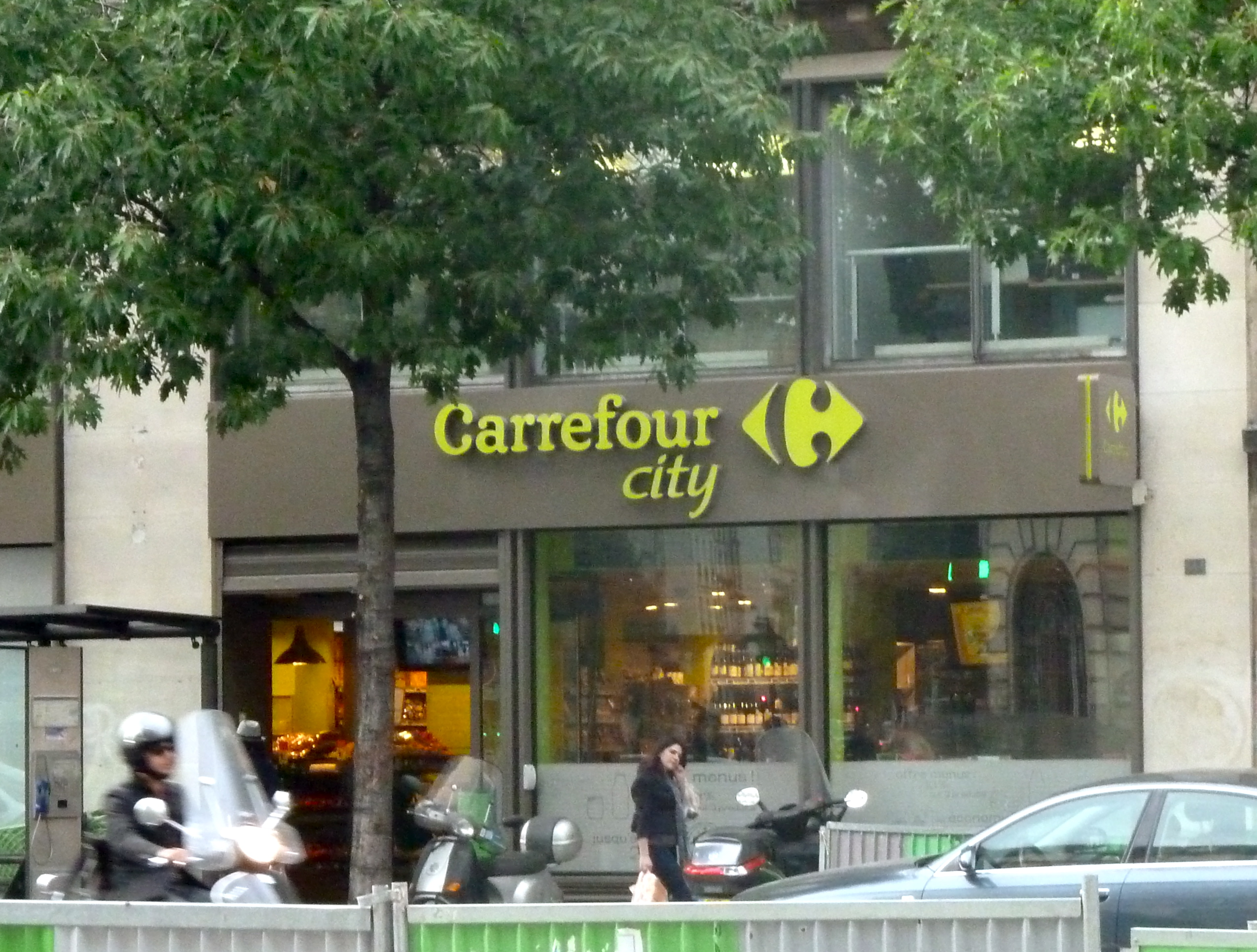
A Carrefour City store in Paris.

=== Defunct store formats ===
==== Carrefour City Café ====
Carrefour City Café was an experimental urban convenience store format that offers hot beverages and food items for consumption on the spot or take away. Over 700 takeaway items (snacks, sandwiches, cold drinks, bread and pastries, etc.) were to be available for city dwellers in the 100 to 150m² stores. The first Carrefour City Café opened in Bordeaux on December 16, 2010 before a second unit followed in early 2011. After nearly two years of market testing, the café format was abandoned.

== See also ==
- Carrefour
