= Alpha-Beta Vasilopoulos =

Greek supermarket chain

AB Vasilopoulos
- Type: Subsidiary
- Industry: Retail (Grocery)
- Founded: 1939; 87 years ago
- Headquarters: Athens, Greece
- Number of locations: 500 (2019)
- Key people: Gerasimos Vasilopoulos Haralambos Vasilopoulos Haralambos Poriazis (Founders)
- Products: Groceries, consumer goods
- Revenue: €3.74 billion (2014)
- Operating income: €311 million (2014)
- Net income: €263 million (2014)
- Number of employees: 14,586 (2014)
- Parent: Ahold Delhaize
- Website: http://www.ab.gr/

Alpha-Beta Vasilopoulos (Άλφα-Βήτα Βασιλόπουλος) or simply AB is a supermarket chain based in Greece owned by Dutch multinational Ahold Delhaize.

== History ==
The company was established in 1939 in Athens, Greece, when brothers Gerasimos and Haralambos Vasilopoulos opened a small grocery shop, on Voulis Street, in downtown Athens. A few years later, they opened a second, larger shop on Stadiou Street, in Athens.

In 1969, Alpha-Beta Vasilopoulos S.A. was formed by Gerasimos & Haralambos Vasilopoulos and Haralambos Poriazis.

In 1970, the first 'real' supermarket was established in the Faros area of Psychiko, Athens. By 1989, AB had opened nine supermarkets in the greater Athens area.

In 1991, AB was listed on the Athens Stock Exchange. In the same year, the first AB MEGA supermarket was opened, in the area of Hellinikon, close to the old Athens Hellinikon International Airport.

In 1992, a new AB MEGA was built on the Athens-Lamia highway. In the meanwhile, AB was acquired by the Belgian retail company "Delhaize Group" (merged with Ahold to form Ahold Delhaize in 2015). In 1994, AB was the first supermarket company in Greece to introduce the barcode system at its cashiers.

Between 1995 and 1998, AB opened a large warehouse, in Mandra, Attica and in 2009 a larger one for fresh and perishables, in Oinofyta, Voiotia.

By 2000, AB had 53 shops in 11 cities in Greece. On 16 October 2000, AB acquired the TROFO and ENA Cash-and-Carry supermarket chains. In 2009, ΑΒ acquired the retail chain Κoryfi, enhancing both its network by 10 stores and its presence in Thrace.

== See also ==
- List of supermarket chains in Greece
