= Metro S.A. =

Supermarket chain in Greece

Metro S.A. is a Greek supermarket chain based in the Metamorfosi suburb of Athens, Greece.

It was established in 1976 as a partnership of eight independent grocery stores. In the same year, Metro opened its first self-branded supermarket in Athens. Today (2015) the company has 108 stores all over Greece. 62 of its stores (usually sized between 1000-2000 m2) operate under the brand name My Market, while the remaining 46 (usually sized over 2000 m2) operate under the brand name Metro Cash & Carry. Metro is the sixth largest supermarket chain in Greece as measured by market share.
