= Masoutis =

Chain of supermarkets in Greece

Masoutis (Greek: Μασούτης) is a supermarket chain in Greece. Its headquarters are located in Thessaloniki. The company was established in 1976 by Diamantis Masoutis, its current owner, and the first Masoutis supermarket opened the same year in Thessaloniki city center. Masoutis is the largest regional retail grocery chain in Greece, and the seventh largest supermarket chain in Greece in terms of market share. As of 2025, the company has 365 supermarkets and 23 cash-and-carry stores in Makedonia, Thrace, Thessaly, Epirus, Fthiotida, Thesprotia, Aitoloakarnania, Attiki as well as the islands of Limnos, Lesvos, Chios and Andros.
