= List of superstores =

This is a list of big-box stores by country.

== Multi-national ==
- Auchan - hypermarkets; France
- B&Q - DIY home improvement; United Kingdom
- Babies "R" Us - baby clothes, care products, furniture, toys (Defunct)
- Barnes & Noble - books, music, videos, magazines
- Best Buy - music, videos, electronics, computer software, appliances
- Blockbuster Video - video rental (Defunct)
- Borders - books, music, videos (Defunct)
- Bricorama - D.Y, gardening; France
- Bunnings - Home improvement; Australia and New Zealand (formerly United Kingdom and Ireland)
- Cabela's - hunting, fishing, camping; historically a US-only chain, but opened its first Canadian location in 2008
- Carrefour - hypermarkets; France
- Castorama - DIY, gardening; France
- Conforama - home furniture, electronics; France
- Cora
- Costco - merged with Price Club; groceries, general merchandise
- Darty - electronics, appliances
- Decathlon - sports equipment, sports clothing, bicycles; France
- E.Leclerc - hypermarkets; France
- Fnac - music, videos, games, books, computer software, electronics, appliances; France
- Galeries Lafayette - department store; France
- Geoffrey's Toy Box - toys, video games, videos (Revival of Toys R Us)
- Harvey Norman - furniture, housewares, electronics; Australia, New Zealand, Singapore, Malaysia, Ireland, United Kingdom (Northern Ireland), Slovenia and Croatia
- Hipercor - hypermarkets; Spain
- The Home Depot - hardware
- IKEA - furniture, housewares
- Kaufland - groceries, general merchandise; Germany, Czech Republic, Slovakia, Poland, Romania, Bulgaria and Croatia
- Kmall24 - Korean cosmetics, groceries, households&groceries, clothing
- Kmart - owned by Transformco; groceries, general merchandise; United States (formerly Canada, Australia, Czechoslovakia, Mexico, New Zealand and Singapore)
  - Big Kmart - groceries, general merchandise (Defunct)
  - Super Kmart - groceries, general merchandise (Defunct; United States, Australia and Mexico)
  - Sears Essentials - groceries, general merchandise (Defunct)
  - Sears Grand - groceries, general merchandise (Defunct)
- Kmart Australia - owned by Wesfarmers previously related to Kmart stores in the US; general merchandise; Australia and New Zealand
- Leroy Merlin - DIY, gardening; France
- Norauto - automotive; France
- OBI
- Office 1
- Office Depot - office supplies
- PetSmart - pet supplies
- PriceSmart
- Real - owned by Metro AG
- Sephora - perfumes; France
- Staples Inc. - office supplies, office equipment
- Target - general merchandise
- Tesco - hypermarkets; United Kingdom
- Tower Records - music, videos (Defunct)
- Toys "R" Us - toys, video games, videos (Temporarily Defunct)
- Walmart - groceries, general merchandise
  - Sam's Club - groceries, general merchandise
  - Walmart Supercenter - groceries, general merchandise
- The Warehouse Group

== Australia ==
- Big W
- Bing Lee
- Bunnings
- Costco
- Harvey Norman
- JB Hi-Fi
- Kmart
- Mitre 10
- Officeworks
- Supercheap Auto
- Target
- The Good Guys

== Bangladesh ==
- Agora Super Stores
- Almas
- Amana Big Bazar
- Meena Bazar
- Mustafa Mart
- PRAN-RFL Group
  - Daily Shopping
  - RFL Best Buy
- Prince Bazar
- Shwapno
- Unimart

== Brazil ==
- Atacadão
- Carrefour
- Leroy Merlin
- Sam's Club

== Canada ==
- Best Buy
- The Brick
- Canadian Tire
- Chapters
- Costco
- Dollarama
- Food Basics
- Geoffrey's Toy Box (revival of Toys R Us)
- Giant Tiger
- The Home Depot
- Home Outfitters
- HomeSense
- The Hudson's Bay Company
- IKEA
- Indigo Books and Music
- Jean Coutu Group - pharmacy, grocery, general merchandise; located in Eastern Ontario and Quebec/New Brunswick
- Jysk
- Lawtons Drugs
- La-Z-Boy
- Loblaws supermarkets, and several of its subsidiaries, including:
  - Real Canadian Superstore
  - Shoppers Drug Mart
- London Drugs
- Mastermind Toys
- Metro
- Penningtons
- PetSmart
- Rona
- Sears (defunct)
- Sobeys
- Sport Chek
- Staples
- Target (defunct)
- Toys "R" Us
  - Babies "R" Us
- Walmart
- Winners

== China ==
- Carrefour - France
- Costco - USA
- Lotte Mart - South Korea
- Leroy Merlin - France
- Sam's Club - USA
- Walmart - USA
- Wumart

=== Hong Kong ===
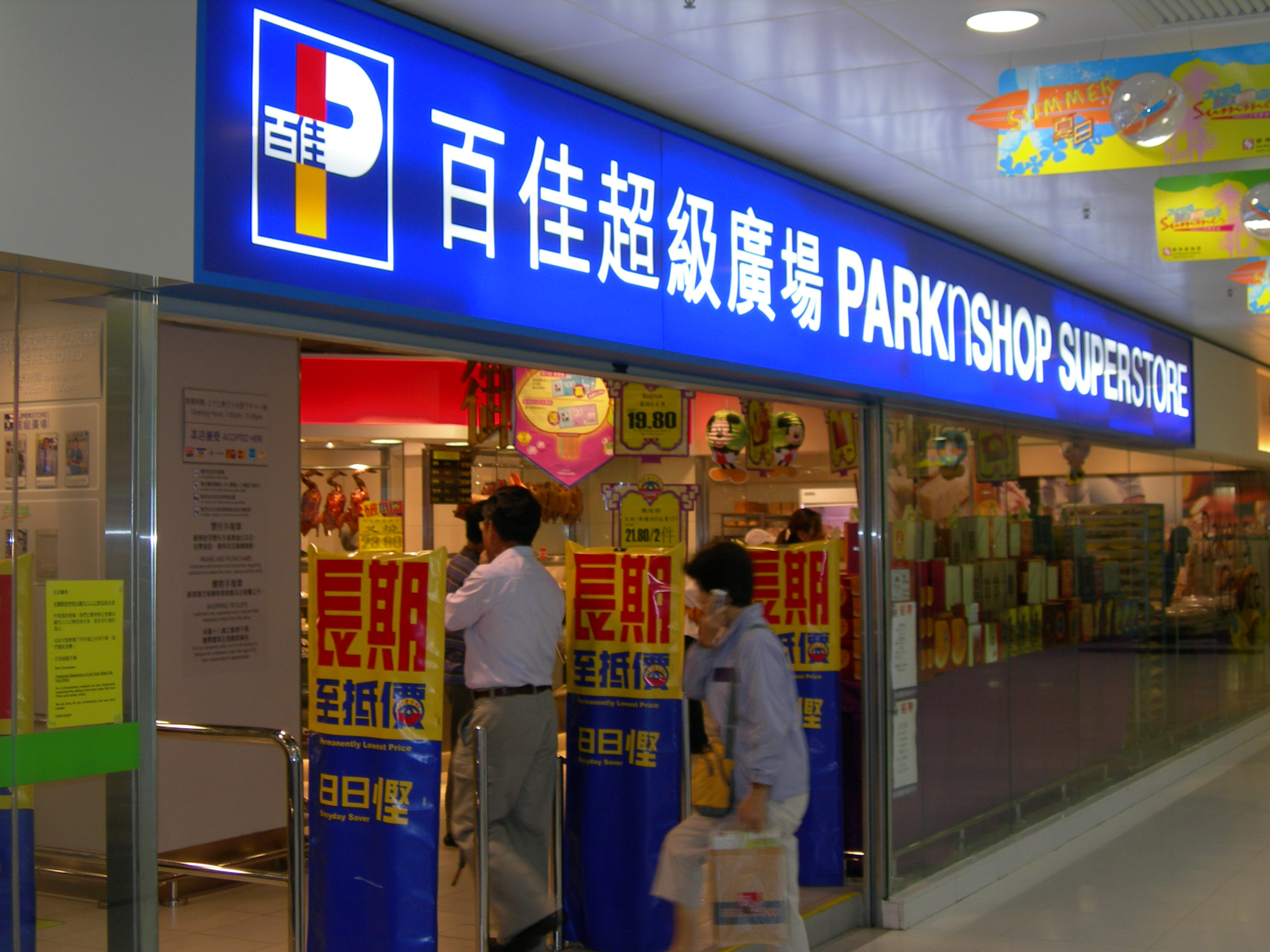
PARKnSHOP Superstore

- CR Vanguard Superstores (Defunct)
- PARKnSHOP Superstores
- PARKnSHOP Megastores (Defunct)
- Wellcome Superstores

== France ==
- 3 Suisses - clothing, electronics, appliances, toys, general household merchandise
- Auchan - hypermarket
- Brico Depot - DIY
- Bricomarché - Groupe Intermarché; DIY
- Bricorama - Groupe Carrefour; DIY
- Carrefour - hypermarket
- Castorama - DIY, gardening
- Celio - clothing
- Conforama - home furniture, housewares, electronics
- Darty - electronics, appliances
- Decathlon - sports equipment, sports clothing, bicycles
- E.Leclerc - hypermarket and cafeteria
- Fnac - music, videos, games, books, computer software, electronics, appliances
- Galeries Lafayette - department store
- Géant - hypermarket
- Groupe Casino - hypermarket and cafeteria
- Habitat - home furniture, housewares
- Hygena - kitchens
- Hyper U - hypermarket
- Intersport - sports equipment, sports clothing
- Jean Delatour - jewellery
- Leroy Merlin - DIY, gardening
- Monoprix - hypermarket
- Mr Bricolage - DIY
- MS Mode - clothing
- Norauto - automotive, car repair
- Point P Groupe Saint-Gobain - DIY
- Printemps - department store
- La Redoute - clothing, electronics, appliances, toys, general household merchandise
- Saint Maclou - home decoration
- Sephora - perfumes
- Soho - dollar store
- Sport 2000 - sports equipment, sports clothing

== India ==
- Big Bazaar - owned by the Reliance Industries
- Easyday - owned by Reliance Industries
- Giant Hypermarket
- Ikea
- More - owned by Amazon
- Jio Mart - owned by Reliance Industries Limited
- Saravana Stores - owned by Saravana Stores
- Spencer's Retail - owned by RPSG Group
- D-mart

== Indonesia ==
- Aeon
- Hero
- Lotte Mart
- Hypermart
- Super Indo
- Ranch Market
- Transmart
- Grand Lucky
- Indogrosir

== Laos ==
- BigC - part of Groupe Casino, France

== Malaysia ==
- Carrefour
- Jaya Grocer
- Econsave
- Giant
- Servay
- Makro
- ÆON
- Kedai Runcit Usaha Kami
- NSK Trade City
- Ninso
- Lotus's (formerly known as Tesco)
- Eco-Shop
- MR.DIY

== New Zealand ==
- Bunnings - Home Improvement
- Kmart - General Merchandise
- Mitre 10 - Home Improvement
- Pak'nSave - Large format discount grocery
- The Warehouse - General Merchandise

== Norway ==
- Coop Obs!
- Smart Club (out of business)

== Pakistan ==
- Carrefour
- Imtiaz Super Market
- Metro Cash and Carry

== Philippines ==
- CSI
- SM Hypermarket
- S&R
- Robinsons Supermarket
- Puregold Supermarket

== Singapore ==
- Carrefour - France
- Giant

== Thailand ==
- Big C - part of Groupe Casino, France and Central Retail Corporation
- Siam Makro
- Lotus's - part of Tesco UK and Lotus Supercenter
- Tops Superstore - part of Central Food Retail

== United Kingdom ==
- Argos - general household merchandise, toys
- Asda - grocery, general merchandise
- B&Q - hardware, home improvement materials
- Currys - electronics, white goods
- DFS - furniture
- Halfords - auto parts and accessories
- Matalan - clothing
- Morrisons - grocery, general merchandise
- Sainsbury's - grocery, general merchandise
- Tesco Extra - grocery, general household merchandise, clothing, furniture and electronics
- Marks & Spencer - clothing, home, food, beauty and M&S bank
- Waitrose - food

== United States ==
=== Big Chain Stores ===
- 99 Cents Only Stores - discount store (defunct)
- A.C. Moore - arts & crafts (defunct)
- A&P - groceries (defunct)
- The Aaron's Company - furniture, home electronics, appliances
- Ace Hardware - hardware, lumber
- Acme Markets - groceries, general merchandise
- Advance Auto Parts - auto parts
- AJWright - clothing, general merchandise (defunct)
- Albertsons - groceries, general merchandise
- Aldi - groceries, general merchandise
- Ames - clothing, general merchandise (defunct)
- Ann & Hope - outlet store (defunct)
- Art Van Furniture - furniture (defunct)
- Ashley Furniture - furniture
- At Home - home decor
- AutoZone - auto parts
- Barnes & Noble - books, music, videos
- Bass Pro Shops - hunting, fishing, camping goods
- Bealls (Florida) - clothing, home goods, general merchandise
- Bed Bath & Beyond - home goods, housewares (defunct)
- Belk - clothing, home goods, general merchandise
- Bergdorf Goodman - clothing, general merchandise
- Best Buy - home electronics, appliances
- Big Lots - discount store, general merchandise, furniture
- Bi-Mart - general merchandise
- Blockbuster - movie/home video rentals (defunct)
- Bob's Discount Furniture - furniture
- Books-A-Million - books, music, videos
  - 2nd & Charles - used books, music, videos, games
- Borders - books, music, videos (defunct)
  - Waldenbooks - used books, music, videos (defunct)
- Boscov's - clothing, general merchandise
- Bradlees - department store (defunct)
- Brooks Pharmacy - pharmaceuticals, general merchandise (defunct)
- Builders Square - home improvement (defunct)
- Burlington - clothing, general merchandise
- Buy Buy Baby - baby superstore (defunct)
- Cabela's - hunting, fishing, camping goods, clothing
- Caldor - department store (defunct)
- CarMax - used car superstore
- Child World - toys (defunct)
- Christmas Tree Shops - home goods, housewares (defunct)
- Circuit City - home electronics (defunct)
- CompUSA - home electronics (defunct)
- Computer City - home electronics (computers) (defunct)
- The Container Store - storage supplies
- Cost Plus World Market - housewares
- Crate & Barrel - home goods, housewares, kitchen supplies
- Crown Books - books (defunct)
- Curacao - electronics, furniture, general merchandise
- CVS Pharmacy - pharmaceuticals, general merchandise
- DSW ("Designer Shoe Warehouse") - shoes
- Dick's Sporting Goods - sporting goods, clothing
- Dillard's - clothing, home goods, general merchandise
- Discount Tire - tires
- Dollar General - discount store
- Dollar Tree - discount store
- DressBarn - clothing (defunct)
- DriveTime - used car superstore
- Eckerd - pharmaceuticals, general merchandise (defunct)
- Fallas - clothing
- Family Dollar - discount store
- Famous Footwear - shoes
- Five Below - discount store
- Floor & Decor - hard-surface flooring
- Food Lion - groceries, general merchandise
- The Fresh Market - groceries
- Fry's - home electronics, appliances, general merchandise (defunct)
- FYE - music, videos
- GameStop - video games
- Gander Mountain - hunting, fishing, camping goods
- Geoffrey's Toy Box - toys and games (revival of Toys R Us)
- Goodwill - used clothing, home goods, used general merchandise
- Golfsmith - golf-related products (defunct)
- Gordmans - clothing (defunct)
- Guitar Center - music equipment
- Half Price Books - used books, music, videos, games, magazines
- Hancock Fabrics - crafts, fabrics (defunct)
- Hannaford - groceries, general merchandise
- Harveys Supermarkets - groceries, general merchandise
- Hastings Entertainment - used books, music, videos, games, magazines (defunct)
- H-E-B - groceries, general merchandise
- hhgregg - home electronics (defunct)
- Hobby Lobby - arts and crafts supplies
- The Home Depot - hardware, lumber, plants, gardening supplies
- HomeGoods - housewares
- IGA, Inc. - groceries
- IKEA - furniture, housewares
- Incredible Universe - home electronics (defunct)
- J. C. Penney - clothing, general merchandise
- Jo-Ann Stores - arts and crafts
- KB Toys - toys (defunct)
- Key Food - groceries, general merchandise
- Kmart (Transformco) - groceries, clothing, general merchandise
- Kohl's - clothing, home goods, kitchen supplies
- Kroger - groceries, general merchandise (Marketplace)
  - Food 4 Less & Foods Co. - groceries
  - Fred Meyer - groceries, clothing, general merchandise
  - Harris Teeter - groceries
  - Ralphs - groceries, general merchandise
- La-Z-Boy - furniture
- Lechmere - electronics, furniture (defunct)
- Levitz Furniture - furniture (defunct)
- Lidl - groceries, general merchandise
- Linens n' Things - home furnishings (defunct)
- Lionel - toys (defunct)
- Lowe's - hardware, lumber, plants, gardening supplies
- Lumber Liquidators - hard-surface flooring
- Macy's - clothing, home goods, general merchandise
  - Bloomingdale's - clothing, home goods, general merchandise
- Marshalls - clothing
- Mattress Firm - mattresses, bed-related products
  - Sleepy's - mattresses, bed-related products (defunct)
- MC Sports - sporting goods (defunct)
- Meijer - groceries, general merchandise
- Menards - hardware, lumber, plants, gardening supplies
- Mervyn's - department store (defunct)
- Michaels - arts and crafts supplies
- Micro Center - home electronics (computers)
- Modell's - sporting goods, clothing (defunct)
- Movie Gallery - movie/home video rentals (defunct)
  - Hollywood Video - movie/home video rentals (defunct)
  - GameCrazy - video games (defunct)
- MovieStop - movie/home video rentals (defunct)
- NAPA Auto Parts - auto parts
- Neiman Marcus - clothing, general merchandise
- Nordstrom - clothing, home goods, general merchandise
  - Nordstrom Rack - clothing, general merchandise
- Ocean State Job Lot - discount store
- Office Depot / OfficeMax - office supplies, furniture
- Old Navy - clothing
- Old Time Pottery - home décor
- Ollie's Bargain Outlet - discount store, groceries, clothing, remaindered books, general merchandise
- O'Reilly Auto Parts - auto parts
- Orchard Supply Hardware - hardware, plants, gardening supplies (defunct)
- Party City - party supplies
- PathMark - groceries, general merchandise
- Payless Shoe Source - shoes (defunct)
- P. C. Richard & Son - home electronics, appliances, mattresses
- Pep Boys - auto repair and tires
- Petco - pet supplies
- PetSmart - pet supplies
- Pier 1 Imports - housewares, general merchandise (defunct late 2020)
- Pottery Barn - housewares
- Publix - groceries, general merchandise
- RadioShack - electronics (defunct)
- Raymour & Flanigan - furniture
- Remke Markets - groceries
- Rent-A-Center - furniture, home electronics, appliances
- ReStore - used appliances, used furniture
- Revco - pharmaceuticals, general merchandise (defunct)
- Rite Aid - pharmaceuticals, groceries
- Ross Dress for Less - clothing
- Safeway - groceries, general merchandise
- Saks Fifth Avenue - clothing, general merchandise
  - Saks Off 5th - clothing, general merchandise
- The Salvation Army - used clothing, home goods, used general merchandise
- Sears (Transformco) - clothing, tools, appliances, general merchandise
- Shopko - general merchandise (defunct)
- Spirit Halloween - Halloween costumes
- Sport Chalet - sporting goods, clothing (defunct)
- Sports Authority - sporting goods, clothing (defunct)
- Sprouts Farmers Market - groceries
- Staples - office supplies, furniture
- Stein Mart - clothing, home furnishings (defunct)
- Stop & Shop - groceries, pharmaceuticals
- SuperCrown - books (defunct)
- SuperValu - groceries, general merchandise
  - New Albertsons - groceries, general merchandise
  - Save A Lot - groceries, general merchandise
- Target - general merchandise, clothing, groceries (Super Target)
  - Target Greatland - groceries, clothing, general merchandise
- Thrift Drug - pharmaceuticals (defunct)
- TJ Maxx - clothing
  - Marshalls - clothing
- Tom Thumb - groceries
- Tower Records - music, videos (defunct)
- Toys "R" Us - toys and games (defunct)
  - Babies "R" Us - baby superstore (defunct)
  - Kids "R" Us - children's clothing (defunct)
- Tractor Supply Company - agricultural products, hardware, plants, gardening supplies, pet supplies
- Trader Joe's - groceries, general merchandise
- True Value - hardware, lumber
- Tuesday Morning - discount store, general merchandise (defunct)
- Tweeter - home electronics (defunct)
- Ulta Beauty - beauty supplies
- Ultimate Electronics - home electronics (defunct)
- Vons - groceries
- Wakefern - groceries
  - ShopRite
  - Price Rite
  - The Fresh Grocer
- Walgreens - pharmaceuticals, general merchandise
  - Duane Reade - pharmaceuticals, general merchandise
- Walmart - groceries, clothing, general merchandise
  - Walmart Supercenter
  - Walmart Neighborhood Market
  - Walmart Express (defunct)
- Wegmans - groceries, general merchandise
- Weis Markets - groceries, general merchandise
- Wet Seal - clothing (defunct)
- Whole Foods Market - groceries, emphasizing 'natural', locally sourced and organic products
- Wickes Furniture - furniture (defunct)
- WinCo Foods - groceries
- Winn-Dixie - groceries, general merchandise
- The Wiz - home electronics (defunct)

=== Warehouse clubs ===
All locations of these chains offer groceries and general merchandise.

- BJ's Wholesale Club
- Costco
- Sam's Club
- Smart & Final

== Vietnam ==
- BigC - part of Groupe Casino, France

== See also ==
- List of department stores
- List of convenience stores
- List of hypermarkets
- List of supermarket chains
