= Hornbach (retailer) =

German DIY-store chain

Hornbach Baumarkt AG
- Traded as: SDAX
- Industry: Retail (Home Improvement)
- Founded: 1877
- Headquarters: Bornheim, Germany
- Key people: Albrecht Hornbach; Erich Harsch
- Products: Home improvement products such as home appliances, tools, household hardware, and garden supplies & plants.
- Revenue: EUR 5.12 billion
- Number of employees: 22,136 (Feb 2021)

Hornbach activities

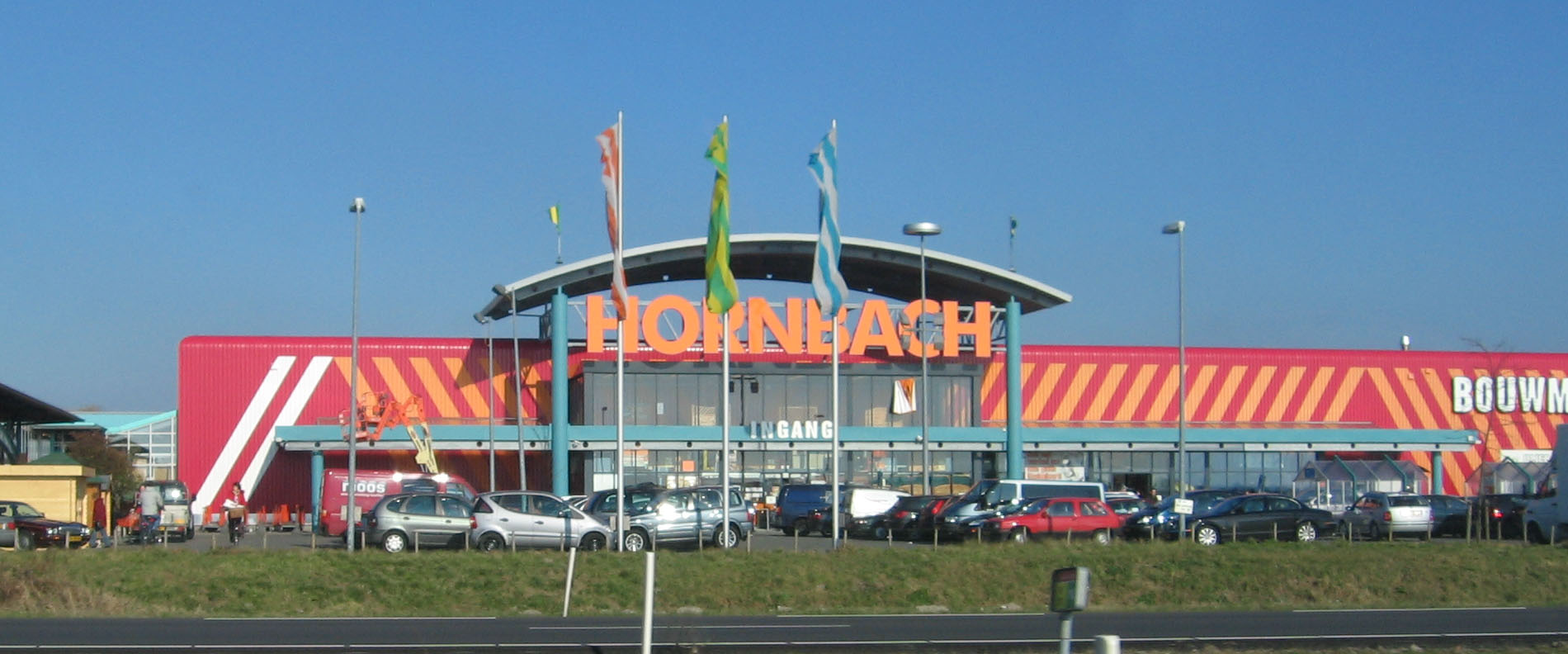
A Hornbach store

Hornbach Baumarkt AG (German pronunciation: [ˈhɔʁnˌbax]) is a German DIY-store chain offering home improvement and do-it-yourself goods. Hornbach is one of the leading DIY-store chains in Germany. In the 2020/2021 financial year (March 1, 2020 to February 28, 2021), the Hornbach Baumarkt Group generated sales of Euro 5.1 billion. The stores are owned and operated by Hornbach Baumarkt AG.

The Hornbach Baumarkt Group currently operates a total of 171 DIY megastores with garden centers and online stores in nine European countries, of which 96 stores are located in Germany (plus: Austria, the Czech Republic, Luxembourg, the Netherlands, Romania, Sweden, Switzerland and Slovakia), as well as two specialist stores for hard flooring (Bodenhaus) in Germany.

Until March 2014, it was 21% owned by Kingfisher plc, a UK company, who also own the B&Q and Castorama DIY chains. Kingfisher sold off the interests as it was planning expansion in new markets that would be in direct competition with Hornbach. Kingfisher has since launched its Screwfix stores in Germany and Brico Dépôt stores in Romania, where Hornbach operates.

== History ==
In the 1960s, the Wilhelm Hornbach OHG was in a bad state, so his grandson Otmar Hornbach launched the idea of a do-it-yourself home improvement store after a visit to the United States. The business was filed on the stock exchange in 1987 and has expanded to a chain of 163 stores.

Otmar Hornbach died on 2 August 2014.

== Ad controversy ==
Hornbach's 2019 "The Smell of Spring" advertisement, created by the agency Heimat, sparked intense backlash globally, particularly from the Asian communities. It was criticized for sexualizing an Asian woman and relying on harmful, fetishizing stereotypes of submissiveness and even the "used underwear" vending machine stereotypes. Organizations such as the South Korean Cultural Center in Germany sent official protest letters to Hornbach, stating that the ad incited disgust and insulted specific races and genders. Facing severe regulatory pressure and public relations damage, Hornbach officially pulled the advertisement from circulation to avoid formal disciplinary actions.

== Hornbach in Europe ==
Country	First store	Number of stores
Germany	1968	98
Netherlands	1997	18
Austria	1996	15
Romania	2007	11
Czech Republic	1998	10
Sweden	2003	8
Switzerland	2002	8
Slovakia	2004	5
Luxembourg	1998	1
