= Praktiker =

German defunct hardware store chain

- Type: Aktiengesellschaft
- Traded as: FWB: PRA
- Industry: Retailing
- Founded: 1978 (Luxembourg)
- Defunct: 2014
- Fate: Bankruptcy with no effect on external subsidiaries: all sold to other companies in 2013–2015
- Headquarters: Hamburg, Germany
- Area served: Germany, Luxembourg, Albania, Bulgaria, Greece, Hungary, Poland, Romania, Turkey, Ukraine
- Key people: Udo Gröner (Insolvency administrator Praktiker AG); Jens-Sören Schröder (Insolvency administrator Max Bahr); Christopher Seagon (Insolvency administrator Praktiker and Extra stores)
- Products: Home improvement and garden centre retail
- Revenue: €3.448 billion (2010)
- Operating income: €35.3 million (2010)
- Net income: ▼ (€554 million) (2011)
- Total assets: €2.031 billion (end 2010)
- Total equity: €839.9 million (end 2010)
- Number of employees: 19,523 (FTE, average 2011)

A Praktiker store in Bucharest, Romania

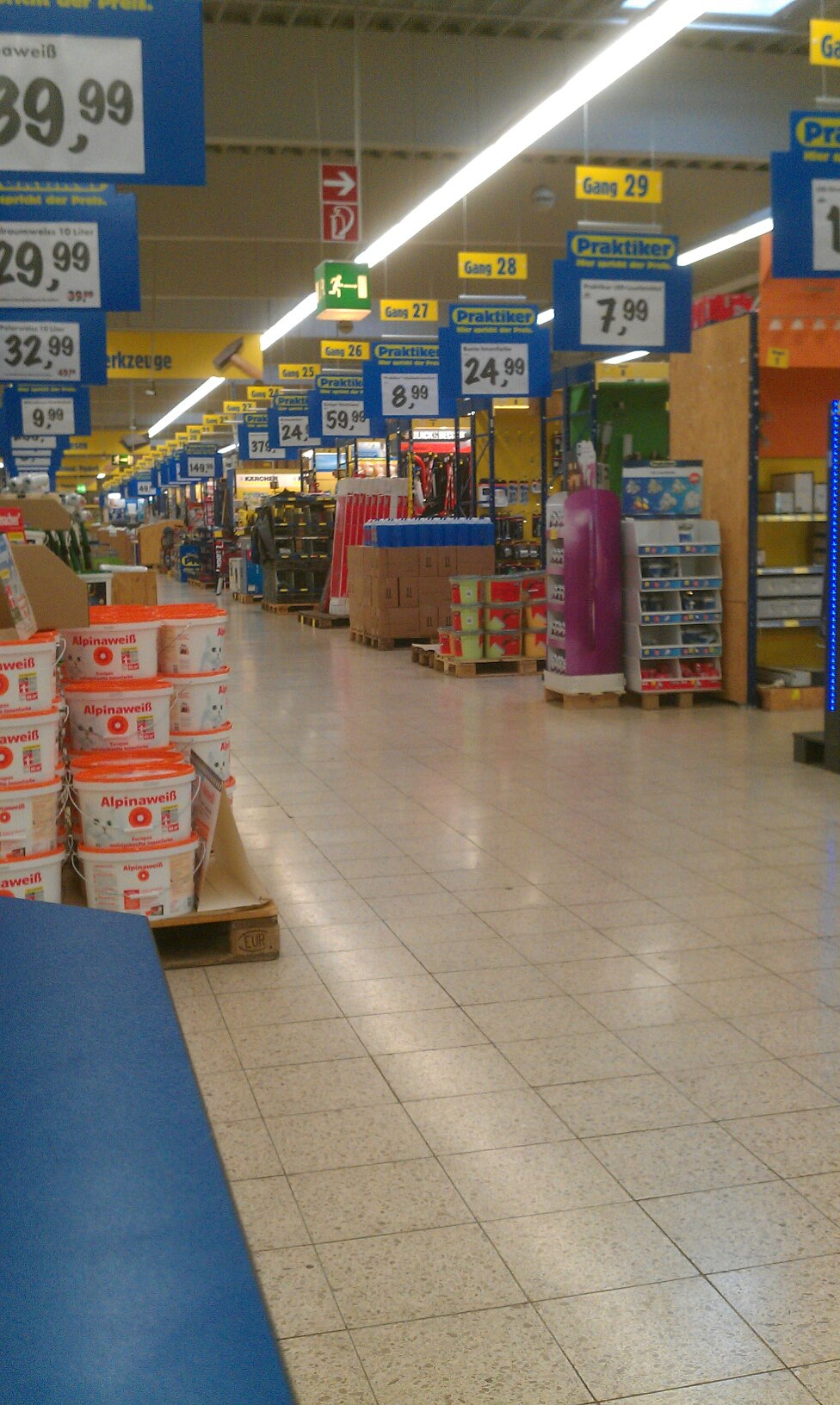
Interior view of a Praktiker store in Neu-Ulm, Germany

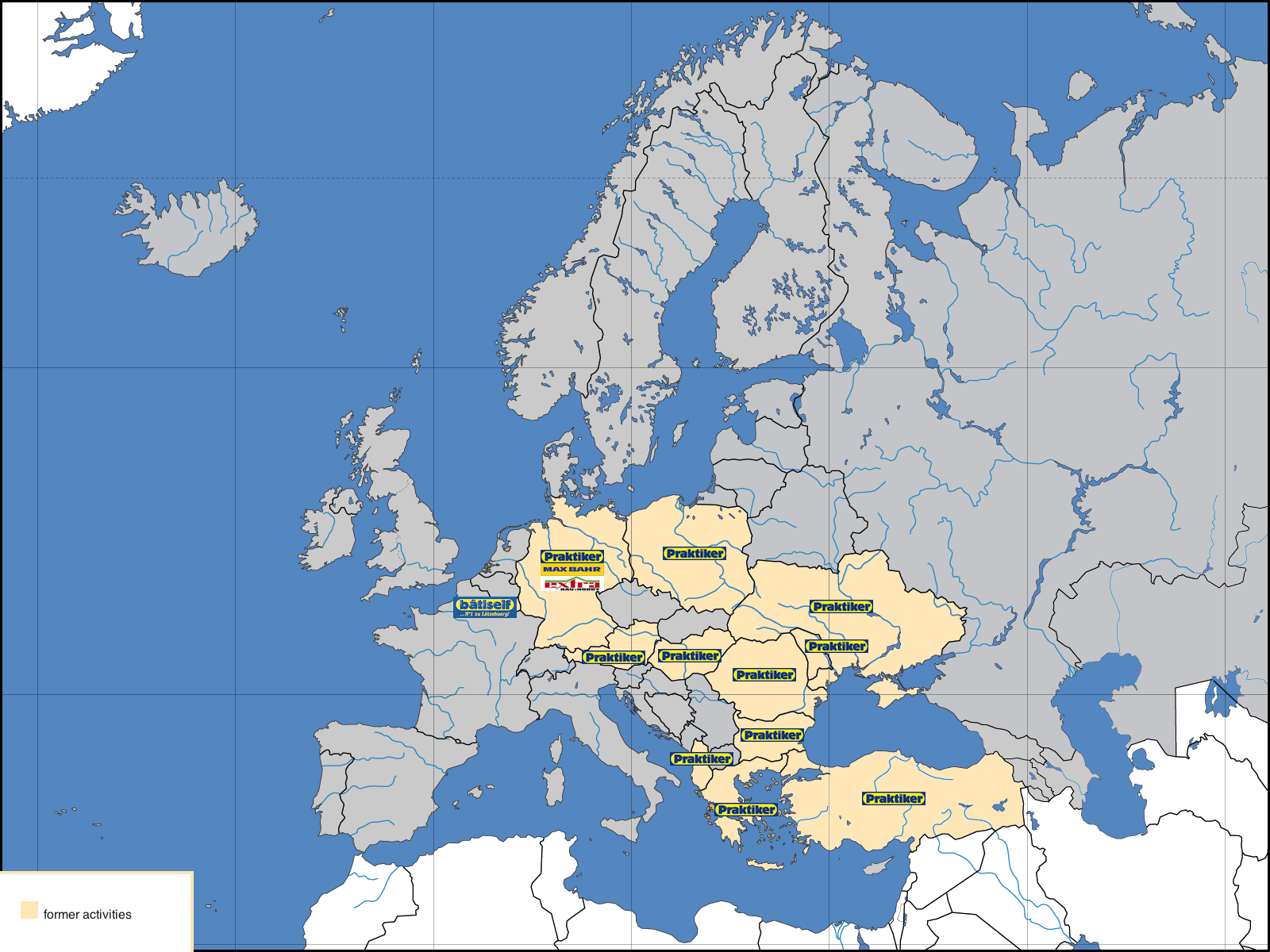
Praktiker activities

Praktiker AG was a German hardware store chain which operated in Europe. It was based in Hamburg and opened its first store in 1978 in Luxembourg under the name bâtiself. Initially owned by ASKO, the chain became a division of Metro AG after the merger of ASKO with Metro Cash & Carry in 1995. It was spun off under the name Praktiker Holding in November 2005 and listed on the Frankfurt Stock Exchange. Since 2006 until 2011 was listed on MDAX and since 2011 until 2013 on SDAX.

In contrast to most of its German competitors, the company grew up by buying up various small DIY chains and building material stores. In addition, there was expansion into the new federal states and other European countries in the 1990s. After Metro AG's withdrawal as shareholder in 2006, the company experienced an existential crisis and posted high losses for years. Despite intensive efforts and considerable financial injections, the attempts to restructure failed.

On July 10, 2013 Praktiker AG announced it would file for insolvency at the Hamburg district court the following day for the eight domestic subsidiaries, including Extra Bau+Hobby. The insolvency application for Praktiker AG was filed on July 12, 2013 at the Saarbrücken District Court and on 25 July 2013 for the Max Bahr subsidiary. The Praktiker and Extra stores were closed on 30 November 2013, followed by the Max Bahr stores on February 25, 2014.

The bankruptcy did not affect Praktiker’s foreign subsidiaries, all of which were sold to other companies between 2013 and 2015. The Praktiker brand continues to be used by former subsidiaries in Bulgaria, Greece, Hungary and Turkey.

In 2016 two German businessmen acquired the naming rights and opened under praktiker.de, a home improvement online store.

== Operations ==
=== Germany ===
In 1979 Praktiker opened its first four stores in Germany. Over the years Praktiker took over many smaller companies and changed most of their stores into Praktiker stores:

- 1979: 9 "BayWa" stores
- 1985: 12 "Wickes" stores
- 1991: "Esbella", "Continent"
- 1993: "BLV", "MHB", "Massa", "Huma", "Extra", "Real-Kauf"
- 1996: 27 "Bauspar" stores
- 1997: 60 "Wirichs" stores
- 1998: 25 "Extra" franchise stores
- 2000: 27 "Top-Bau" stores
- 2006: 76 "Max Bahr" stores

The Praktiker management began in late 2012 with the transformation of 119 Praktiker stores to Max Bahr stores. At the end of this process in December 2013 Germany would have had 117 Praktiker and 196 Max Bahr outlets, compared to 236 Praktiker and 78 Max Bahr stores at the beginning of that process. Because of insolvency applications in July 2013, all those plans are stopped, with 54 former Praktiker stores already transferred to Max Bahr outlets. The companies Hellweg and Globus failed to reach an agreement with the Royal Bank of Scotland to buy 59 Max Bahr stores in November 2013. All Praktiker, Extra Bau+Hobby and Max Bahr stores were closed by the end of November 2013 (Praktiker, Extra, 40 Max Bahr stores) or at the end of February 2014 (remaining Max Bahr stores).

=== Europe ===
==== Former subsidiaries still using Praktiker name ====
The Bulgarian subsidiary, Praktiker EOOD, was sold to Videolux Holding AD. The company, which operates electronics retailer Technopolis, opened two new stores and renovated all Praktiker locations by the end of 2017.

Praktiker Greece was sold on April 8, 2014 to Canadian investor Fairfax Financial. On July 16, 2025, Romanian DIY retailer Dedeman announced the acquisition of all 17 Praktiker stores in Greece.

The 19 Hungarian Praktiker stores were sold to Papag AG in January 2015, then to Wallis Group in January 2016.

In Turkey, Praktiker initially closed its 9 stores after failing to find a buyer. In 2014, the stores were acquired by Uygulama Yapı Marketleri, which reopened existing stores and launched new locations.

==== Former subsidiaries ====
In Luxembourg, the three "bâtiself" stores in Foetz, Strassen and Ingeldorf were sold in October 2013. These stores were rebranded and are no longer associated with the Praktiker brand.

In Ukraine, the first store opened on November 29, 2007, in Donetsk, followed by additional locations in Lviv, Mykolaiv and Kyiv. The stores were sold on February 11, 2014, to Ukrainian investor Kreston Guarantee Group. The network was rebranded in 2017 as Leroy Merlin.

Praktiker Romania S.R.L., which operated 27 stores in Romania, was sold to Search Chemicals, in February 2014. In 2017, 20 stores were acquired by Kingfisher plc and rebranded as Brico Dépôt.

The 24 Praktiker stores in Poland were sold to Papag AG in March 2014. However, the group was declared bankrupt in 2017 and all stores were closed. Some former Praktiker stores are now part of the Castorama network operated by Kingfisher.

In Albania, the first store opened on October 30, 2009, in Tirana. It was closed on November 30, 2011, due to restructuring.

In Moldova, the company planned to open a store in 2009 in Chişinău, but this was later canceled.
