= Dacem =

Dacem is a wholesaler of electrical accessories, established in 1984. The company sources products, negotiates with suppliers, purchases products and brings them into its warehouse and afterwards sells the products, normally to electrical retailers.

Dacem is wholly owned by Darty, a European group of electrical retailers. Dacem primarily supplies its products to the retailers within the group, however it also has the capability to supply to external clients.

== History ==
When established in 1984, Dacem was a wholly owned subsidiary of Darty, a French electrical retailer. The name "Dacem" was derived from a French acronym, which loosely translates as "Darty accessories concession & purchaser". Dacem established dedicated areas within Darty stores, primarily in the Paris region, and employed its own dedicated staff; in other stores, the accessories were presented and sold by staff from the main store.

In the early 1990s, Darty was bought by Kingfisher plc, whose store chains included B&Q, Comet and Superdrug. The board decided to leverage the purchasing expertise of its specialist accessory sourcing team, and in 1998, Dacem began supplying products to other electrical retailers within the group, including Comet. As of November 2006, Dacem are the exclusive supplier of Darty, and a key supplier of the other electrical retailers outside France.

In 2003, Kingfisher demerged the electrical retailing unit of its business to form Kesa Electricals. Dacem was included in the demerged group. In 2004, Darty decided to take ownership of all parts of its retail stores, and the dedicated space and staff formerly managed directly by Dacem passed over to Darty. After this time, Dacem became solely a wholesaler for the group.

Dacem's offices are located in the north of Paris, in Bobigny. In 2002, Dacem opened a purpose-built warehouse in Moussy-Le-Neuf, north of Charles de Gaulle Airport. All orders are prepared in the Moussy warehouse, and distributed to the warehouses of the retailers.

As of November 2006, the board of Dacem is:

Managing Director - Jean-Michel Ravel d'Estienne
Commercial Director - Jean-Philippe Marazzani
Sales Director - Frédéric Lamy
Logistics Director - Yves Simon de Kerqunic
