= Bricostore =

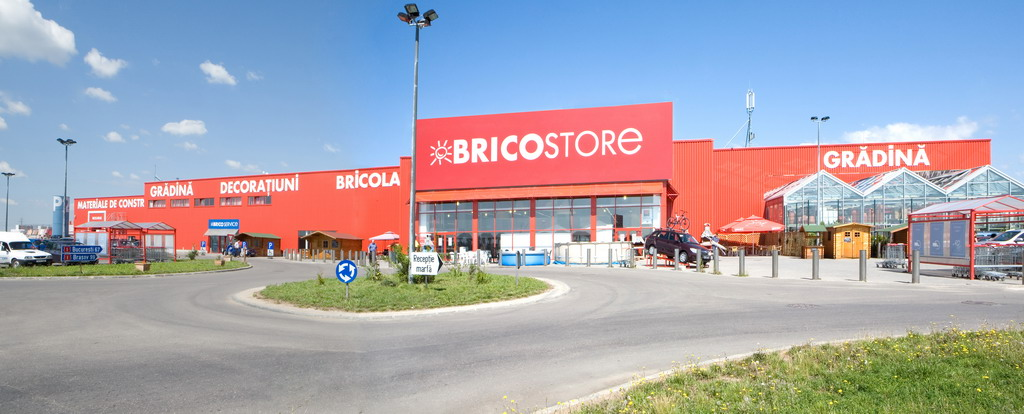
- Bricostore store in Ploiești, Romania
- Type: Private
- Industry: Retail
- Founded: 1991 (Paris)
- Headquarters: Paris, France
- Key people: Philippe Bresson, CEO & Chairman
- Products: Home improvement tools, garden supplies & plants
- Website: www.bricostore.com

Bricostore was a French home improvement retailer which operated stores in France, Hungary, Romania and Croatia. Founded by the French Bresson family in Paris in 1991, the company operated 7 stores in France until 2001, when they sold 6 stores to Bricorama and closed the remaining one.

In Hungary, Bricostore opened its first store in 1999 and had a total of 9 stores. The stores were closed in 2012 and subsequently sold to other retailers and companies, such as OBI who bought 3 stores.

Bricostore opened the first store in Romania in March 2002 and reached 15 stores in March 2011. In April 2013, the British Kingfisher bought the stores for 75 million euro and rebranded them as Brico Dépôt.

Bricostore in Croatia was opened in 2004 and later opened another 2 stores. The stores were closed in 2013. Stores in Kaštel Sućurac and Zagreb were rebranded to Pevex, and store in Pula was rebranded to Bauhaus.
