= Véronique Laury =

French businesswoman (born 1965)

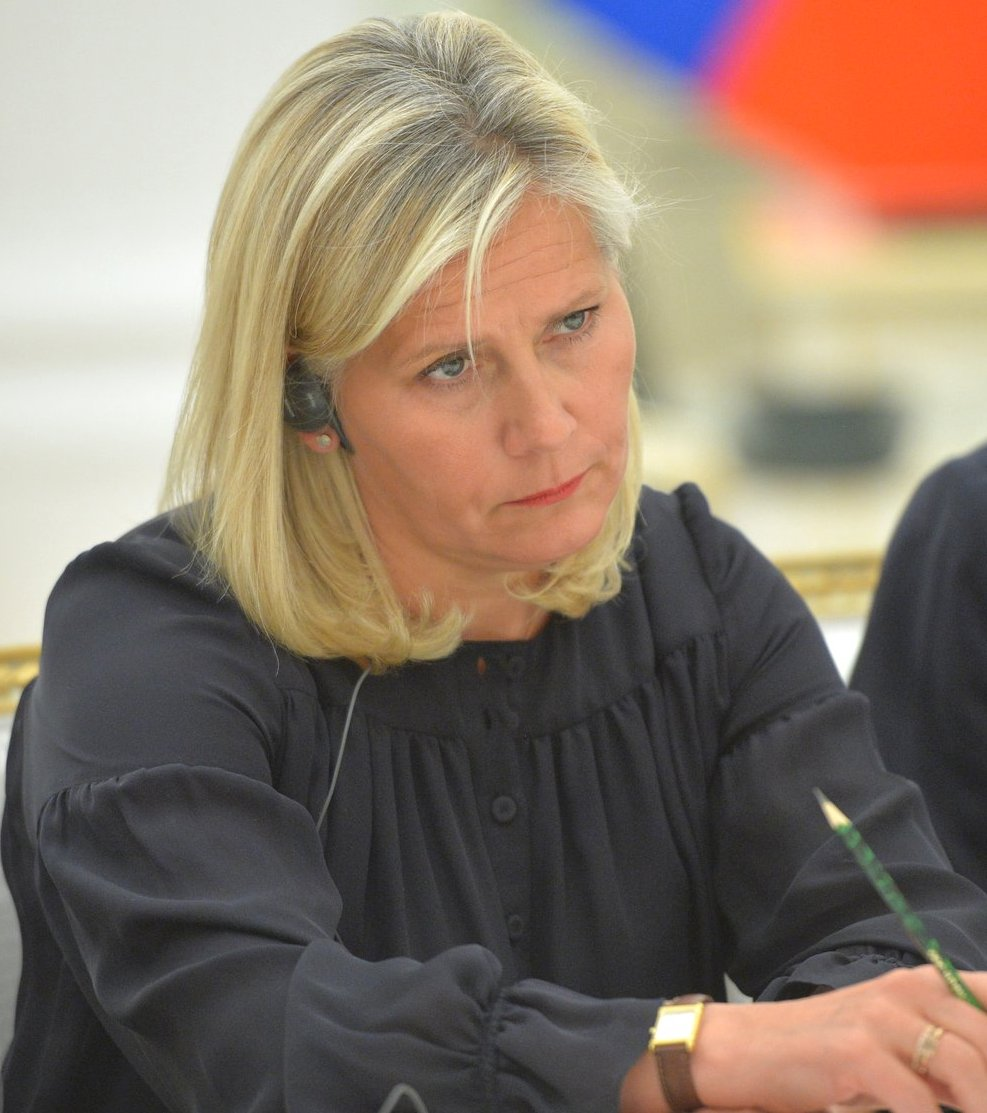
- Born: 29 June 1965 (age 61); Lens, France
- Occupation: Businesswoman
- Title: Former CEO of Kingfisher plc
- Term: 2015-2019
- Predecessor: Ian Cheshire
- Successor: Thierry Garnier
- Children: 3

Véronique Laury (born 29 June 1965) is a French businesswoman who was CEO of Kingfisher plc, from February 2015 to September 2019.

In March 2019, it was announced that Laury would leave Kingfisher at a date to be announced following the failure of her "One Kingfisher" recovery plan and a 52.8% drop in pre-tax profits.

== Early life ==
Véronique Laury was born on 29 June 1965. She attended the Sciences Po, the Paris Institute of Political Studies, or Institut d'études politiques de Paris (IEP).

== Career ==
She spent fifteen years at Leroy Merlin in France.

=== Kingfisher ===
In September 2014, it was announced that Laury would replace Ian Cheshire as CEO of Kingfisher plc, a FTSE 100 British multinational retail company from February 2015. Laury has worked at Castorama, a subsidiary of Kingfisher, for eleven years, including roles at B&Q.

== Personal life ==
She is also known as Veronique Laury-Deroubaix. She has a daughter and two sons, and lives in Lille. She enjoys horse riding, and is a former show jumper.

Business positions
Preceded by Ian Cheshire	Chief Executive of Kingfisher; January 2015 - September 2019	Succeeded by Thierry Garnier
Preceded by	Chief Executive of Castorama; March 2013 - December 2014	Succeeded by
