= Wegert =

German electricals company

Wegert was an electricals company in Germany which specialized in white goods. Latterly, Wegert was a wholly owned subsidiary of Kesa Electricals plc, although most of its lifespan was spent in Kingfisher plc. The stores were closed down in 2003 due to declining sales.
