= Andy Cosslett =

British businessman

Andy Cosslett CBE
- Born: Andrew Peter Cosslett; 14 April 1955 (age 71); Whalley Range, Manchester, England
- Education: University of Manchester
- Occupation: Businessman
- Known for: Chairman, Rugby Football Union
- Title: Chairman, ITV
- Term: June 2022

Andrew Peter Cosslett, CBE (born 14 April 1955) is a British businessman and chairman of ITV. He is former chairman of Rugby Football Union and Kingfisher plc.

He is also a former operating partner at Advent International, and former Trustee of Shooting Star Chase, a children's hospice charity. Previously he was the CEO of InterContinental Hotels Group (IHG), and was succeeded by Richard Solomons.

== Early life ==
Andrew Peter Cosslett was born in April 1955 in Whalley Range, Manchester and grew up in Withington. He earned a bachelor's degree in economics and a master's degree in European Studies from the University of Manchester.

== Career ==
Cosslett began his business career in 1979 as a graduate trainee selling Wall's ice cream and spent 11 years with Unilever becoming a marketing director, before joining Cadbury Schweppes in 1990. He then spent 14 years at Cadbury Schweppes in a number of senior roles, including chairman, Cadbury Schweppes Australia; CEO of the Asia Pacific confectionery business; managing director, Great Britain & Ireland; and president, Europe, Middle East and Africa.

Cosslett joined InterContinental Hotels Group as CEO in 2005. As CEO of IHG, he oversaw the launching of the midmarket boutique hotel brand Hotel Indigo, and a focus on further expansion into the Chinese market. An additional change includes IHG selling most of the hotels the company owned and reaffirming their business model as mainly a manager and franchisor of hotels. During the late 2000s, he oversaw a $1bn (£603m), four-year relaunch of the Holiday Inn franchise.

Between 2005 and 2011, Cosslett was a board member of the World Travel and Tourism Council (WTTC), a member of the presidents council of the Confederation of British Industry (CBI) and a board member of the International Tourism Partnership.

Cosslett stood down as the CEO on 30 June 2011 stating that he has been considering his situation for quite a while: “I’m into my seventh year, but it does feel like the right time to hand over the reins. ... The business is in great shape, and that really helps my exit.”

In June 2017, Cosslett succeeded Daniel Bernard as chairman of Kingfisher plc. He stepped down from this role in April 2024.

In June 2022, Cosslett was appointed Chairman of ITV.

== Rugby Football Union ==
Coslett became chair of the RFU in October 2016, succeeding Bill Beaumont. He himself played rugby for 25 years. He was appointed Commander of the Order of the British Empire (CBE) in the 2022 New Year Honours for services to the Rugby Football Union.
