= Daniel Bernard (businessman) =

French businessman (1946–2026)

- Born: Daniel Camille Bernard; February 1946
- Died: 5 August 2026 (aged 80)
- Education: HEC Paris
- Occupation: Businessman
- Known for: Former chairman, Kingfisher plc
- Board member of: Kingfisher plc Capgemini

Daniel Camille Bernard (February 1946 – 5 August 2026) was a French businessman who was a past chairman of Kingfisher plc.

== Early life ==
Daniel Camille Bernard was born in northern France in February 1946. He attended HEC Paris Business School before becoming the director of various hypermarket chains.

== Career ==
Bernard left Metro Group to join Carrefour as a general manager in 1992. He became chairman and CEO in 1998. During his time as CEO, Carrefour expanded from an only French supermarket to an international brand. Bernard also oversaw Carrefour's merger with Promodès in 1999. He was removed from his position as CEO in 2005 in the wake of falling stock prices which he had failed to fix.

He was the chairman of Kingfisher plc from June 2009, having been deputy chairman from May 2006. He was president of Provestis, his own investment company, and since January 2010, chairman of MAF Retail Group, Dubai. He was senior advisor of TowerBrook Capital Partners from October 2010. He was a non-executive director of Capgemini, and honorary chairman of the HEC Business School Foundation in Paris and a member of HEC's advisory board.

In June 2017, Bernard was succeeded by Andy Cosslett as chairman of Kingfisher.

== Personal life and death ==
Bernard lived in France. He died on 5 August 2026, at the age of 80.
