= Richard Solomons =

British businessman

- Born: Richard Leslie Solomons; 9 October 1961 (age 64); London, England
- Education: University College School
- Alma mater: University of Manchester
- Occupation: Businessman
- Years active: 1985–present
- Title: former CEO, InterContinental Hotels Group
- Term: 2011–17
- Predecessor: Andy Cosslett
- Successor: Keith Barr

Richard Leslie Solomons (born 9 October 1961) is a British businessman. He was the chief executive of InterContinental Hotels Group until July 2017, when he was succeeded by Keith Barr. He is chair of Rentokil Initial.

== Education ==
Solomons has a BA in economics from the University of Manchester.

== Career ==
Solomons qualified as a chartered accountant with KPMG in 1985. He then worked in investment banking with Hill Samuel Bank for seven years, including two years in New York. He joined InterContinental Hotels Group in 1992.

Solomons was at IHG for nearly two decades before taking the helm in 2011. He was Chief Executive of Intercontinental Hotels from July 2011 to July 2017. Prior to this role, he was Chief Financial Officer, and before that Head of Commercial Development since June 2009.

According to The Daily Telegraph, "Solomons' long tenure at the company should make it one of the FTSE's more seamless successions".

Solomons is non-executive director and chairman of the advisory committee to Hotelbeds.

== Personal life ==
Solomons is married with three children.
