= Thierry Garnier =

French businessman (born 1966)

- Born: 25 March 1966 (age 60); Asnières-sur-Seine, France
- Education: École Polytechnique; École des Mines
- Occupation: Businessman
- Title: CEO, Kingfisher
- Term: September 2019-
- Predecessor: Véronique Laury

Thierry Garnier (born 25 March 1966) is a French businessman, chief executive officer (CEO) of Kingfisher, a UK based retail group, since September 2019.

== Early life ==
Garnier studied mathematics and engineering at École Polytechnique. He also earned a degree from École des Mines.

== Career ==
Garnier worked for Carrefour for 22 years, rising to CEO of Carrefour Asia from 2012, and was responsible for over 350 stores in China and Taiwan, with 55,000 employees, and gross sales of over €6 billion.

In September 2019, Garnier succeeded Véronique Laury as CEO of Kingfisher plc, a FTSE 100 British multinational retail company.

Garnier is a board member of Tesco.

== Personal life ==
Garnier is separated, and has three daughters and two sons. He lives in Marylebone, London. He is fluent in Mandarin.

Business positions
Preceded by Véronique Laury	Chief Executive of Kingfisher; September 2019 -	Succeeded by Incumbent
