= Nigel Northridge =

British businessman (born 1956)

- Born: Nigel Hargreaves Northridge; January 1956 (age 70)
- Education: Sullivan Upper School, Belfast
- Alma mater: Northern Ireland Polytechnic
- Occupation: Businessman
- Title: Chairman, Hogg Robinson Group
- Board member of: Hogg Robinson Group; Inchcape; Scandinavian Tobacco Group

Nigel Hargreaves Northridge (born January 1956) is a British businessman, the chairman of Hogg Robinson Group since April 2016, and was the chairman of the British multinational department store chain, Debenhams from April 2010 to April 2016.

== Early life ==
Nigel Hargreaves Northridge was born in January 1956. He was educated at Sullivan Upper School, Belfast, followed by an HND in business studies from Northern Ireland Polytechnic.

== Career ==
Northridge worked for Gallaher Group for 32 years, rising to chief executive, from 2000 to 2007.

Northridge was the chairman of the British multinational department store chain, Debenhams from April 2010 to April 2016, when he was succeeded by Sir Ian Cheshire.

Northridge has been the chairman of Hogg Robinson Group since April 2016, following John Coombe's retirement.

He is a non-executive director at Inchcape and is a non-executive director, and the vice chairman of Scandinavian Tobacco Group. He has been a non-executive director of Aggreko, Thomas Cook Group, and Aer Lingus.
