= Geoffrey Mulcahy =

British businessman (born 1942)

Sir Geoffrey John Mulcahy (born 7 February 1942) is a British businessman who led Kingfisher plc, the FTSE 100 Index company.

== Career ==
Born in Sunderland and educated at The King's School, Worcester, Manchester University (B.Sc.) and Harvard University (MBA), Geoffrey Mulcahy started at Esso before moving to British Sugar and then Norton Abrasives. He was successively Finance Director, Chairman and latterly Chief Executive of Kingfisher plc, the UK retail conglomerate. Mulcahy was responsible for the purchase of the retail chain Woolworths in 1982, as well as Comet and B&Q and was also the Chief Executive of Kingfisher during its subsequent sale of Woolworths in 2001.

He retired in 2003. He has since been appointed chairman of the specialist retail consultancy Javelin Group.
