= Ian Cheshire (businessman) =

British businessman (born 1959)

Sir Ian Cheshire
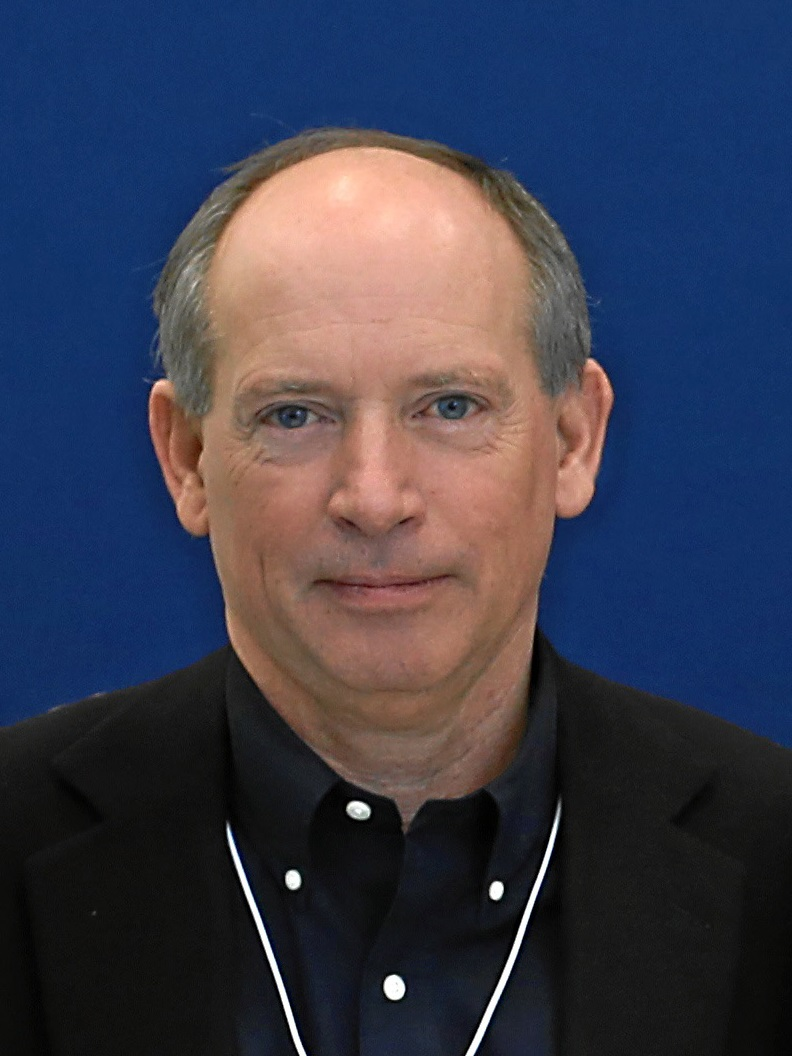
- Cheshire in 2013

Personal details
- Born: Ian Michael Cheshire; 6 August 1959 (age 67) Miri, Malaysia
- Spouse: Kate Cheshire
- Children: 3
- Education: The King's School, Canterbury
- Alma mater: Christ's College, Cambridge
- Occupation: Businessman

Sir Ian Michael Cheshire (born 6 August 1959) is a British businessman and chairman of Land Securities Group PLC. Cheshire joined the board as a non-executive director in March 2023 and became chair in May 2023. He is also Chair of Ofcom

== Education ==
Cheshire was educated at The King's School, Canterbury, and graduated in economics and law from Christ's College, Cambridge, in 1980.

== Career ==
In January 2008, he was appointed as group chief executive of Kingfisher plc

In 2012, Cheshire won The Guardian Sustainable Business Leader of the Year award."

He was knighted in the 2014 New Year Honours for services to business, sustainability, and the environment.

In September 2014, it was announced that Véronique Laury would replace Cheshire as CEO of Kingfisher from February 2015.

In January 2016, he was hired as chairman-elect of Debenhams. On 7 April 2016, he succeeded Nigel Northridge. He was voted off the board on 10 January 2019.

Cheshire was also chair of the Barclays UK retail bank from 2017 to 2020.

Cheshire was appointed chair of Spire Healthcare in March 2021, and of Land Securities in May 2023.

In July 2025, Cheshire was named as a commissioner on the Government's Pensions Commission.

He became Chair of Ofcom on 11 June 2026.

Media offices
Preceded by Charles Gurassa	Chairman of Channel 4; 11 April 2022 – 10 April 2025	Succeeded by Incumbent
