= Albrecht Hornbach =

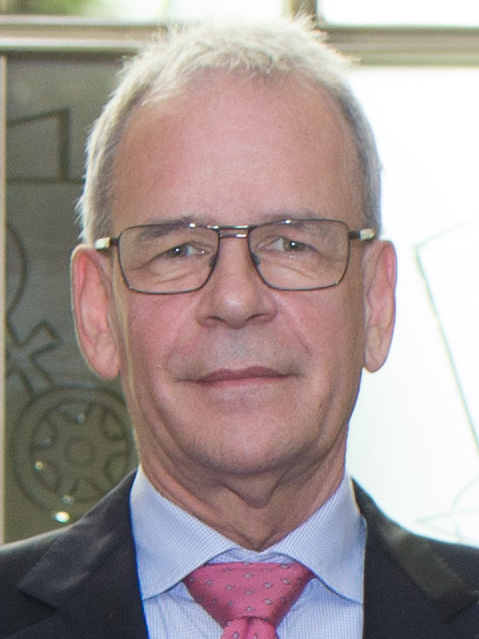
Albrecht Hornbach in 2018

Albrecht Hornbach (born 24 October 1954, in Landau) is a German businessman, CEO of the German DIY store Hornbach since 1998, and president of the group's holding since 2001.

== Biography ==
Hornbach obtained a degree in civil engineering from the university of Karlsruhe in 1980. After graduation, he worked in a structural engineering company, and as a director in a real estate development company.

Hornbach joined the family company, Hornbach, in 1991, in charge of opening new stores. In 1998, he became CEO of Hornbach-Baumarkt-AG, and in November 2001, he became president of the holding that controls the Hornbach group, Hornbach Holding AG.

Up until October 2001, Hornbach was the chairman of the management board at Hornbach-Baumarkt-AG. From April 2002 to March 2009, he was member of the supervisory board of Hornbach-Baumarkt-AG. In March 2009, he became chairman of the supervisory board, member of the audit committee and member of the mediation committee.

In July 2015, Hornbach became the president of the IHK of Pfalz, where he already was vice-president

== Other tenures ==
- Chairman of the supervisory Board at Hornbach Immobilien AG
- Member of the board of Inception Exploration Ltd
- Board of directors of Redcliff Exploration inc
- Honorary Consul of Romania in Neustadt an der Weinstraße

== See also ==
- Hornbach
