= Brico Dépôt =

French home improvement and DIY retail chain

- Type: Subsidiary
- Industry: Retail
- Founded: 6 October 1993; 32 years ago
- Founder: Castorama
- Headquarters: Longpont-sur-Orge, France
- Products: DIY, home improvement and building materials
- Parent: Kingfisher plc (France, Spain and Portugal); Altex Romania (Romania)
- Website: bricodepot.fr

Brico Dépôt (French pronunciation: [bʁiko depo]) is a French chain of do it yourself (DIY), home improvement and building-material stores. It was established by Castorama in 1993, with the first store opening in Reims, France. The chain operates a low-cost warehouse format, offering a limited range of home-improvement products in large quantities.

Brico Dépôt became part of the British retail group Kingfisher plc in 2002 following Kingfisher's acquisition of Castorama. Kingfisher operates the chain in France, Spain and Portugal. The Romanian business was sold by Kingfisher to Altex Romania in May 2025 and continues to operate under the Brico Dépôt brand.

== History ==
Original Brico Dépôt logo, used from 1993 to 2021

=== France ===
The first Brico Dépôt store opened on 6 October 1993 in Reims, replacing a Castorama store. The original concept was partly conceived as a way of selling surplus and end-of-line merchandise, before developing into a separate discount home-improvement format.

The chain expanded rapidly during the late 1990s and early 2000s. It had 26 stores in 1999, 34 in 2000 and 43 by the end of 2001. In 2002, when Castorama and Brico Dépôt became part of Kingfisher plc, the chain opened its 50th French store. Its 100th store followed in 2010.

In the financial year ended 31 January 2025, Brico Dépôt France reported revenue of €2.24 billion, net profit of €2.19 million and employed around 8,000 people.

=== Spain and Portugal ===
Brico Dépôt entered Spain in 2003. Its first Spanish store was opened in Viana, Navarre.

The chain entered Portugal in 2014 with the opening of a store in Loures.

In November 2018, Kingfisher announced its intention to dispose of the Brico Dépôt businesses in Spain and Portugal as part of a wider restructuring of the group. The decision was reversed in June 2020, with Kingfisher stating that it believed the Iberian operation could be developed into a profitable and sustainable business.

In May 2026, the opening of a store in San Fernando, Cádiz, increased the Spanish network to 29 stores. In July 2026, Brico Dépôt opened its fourth Portuguese store, in Seixal, following existing locations in Loures, Sintra and Vila Nova de Gaia.

=== Poland ===
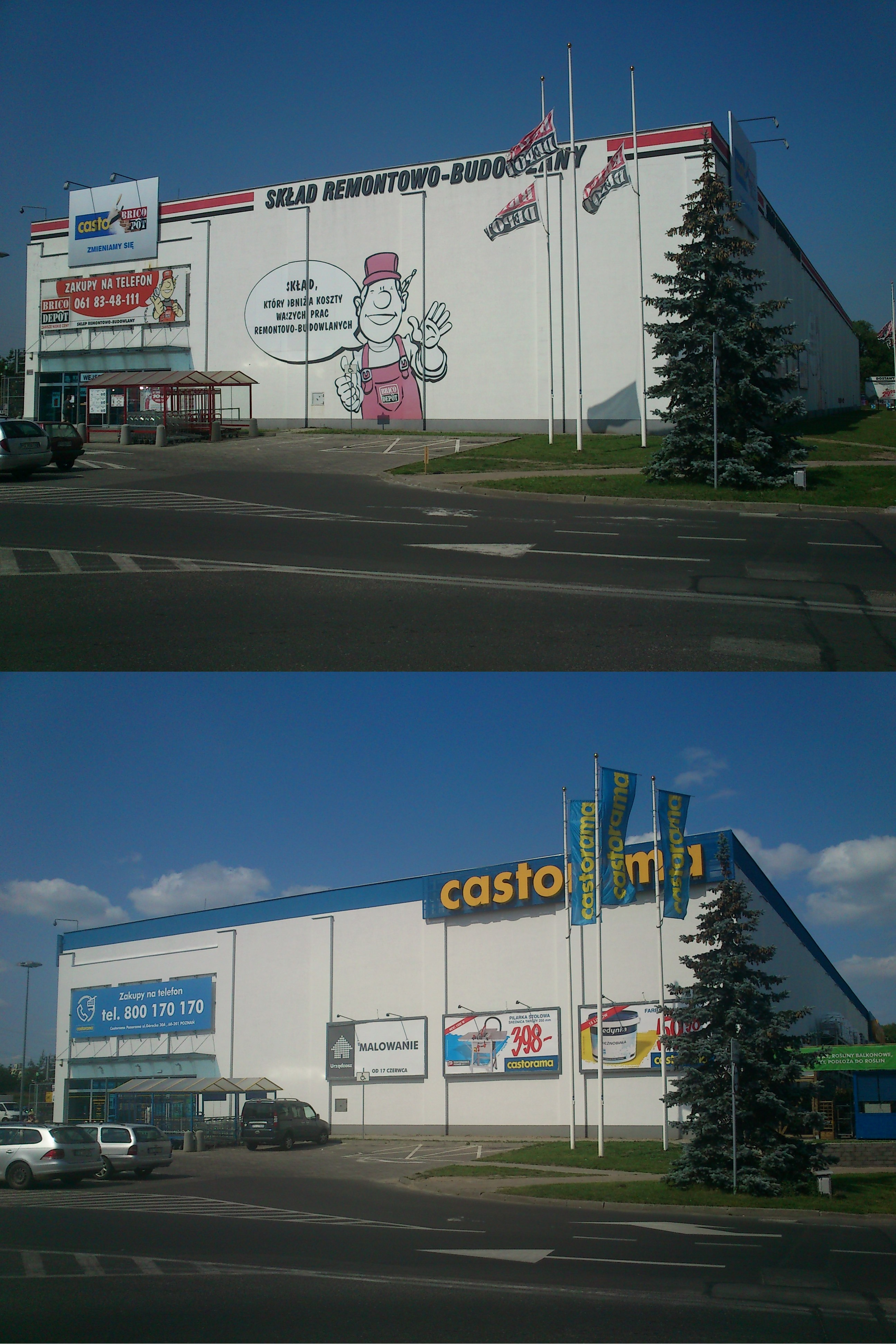
A Brico Dépôt store in Poznań before and after its rebranding as Castorama

Brico Dépôt was introduced in Poland by Castorama Polska in 2006. The first store was opened in Warsaw as a smaller-format concept aimed particularly at professional customers, and the network subsequently expanded to cities including Poznań, Toruń, Stargard, Skarżysko-Kamienna and Puławy.

In 2012, Castorama Polska began converting Brico Dépôt stores to the Castorama format as it decided to concentrate its future expansion on the better-known Castorama brand. The stores in Stargard and Poznań were among the first to be rebranded. The Brico Dépôt store in Skarżysko-Kamienna was converted to Castorama in 2013.

The Puławy store, which had operated under the Brico Dépôt name for about 13 years, was converted to Castorama in March 2025. At the time, it was described as the penultimate Brico Dépôt store in Poland. The remaining location in Toruń continues to be listed by Castorama Polska under the combined name Castorama Brico Depot Toruń.

=== Romania ===
Kingfisher entered the Romanian home-improvement market in 2013 through the acquisition of 15 Bricostore stores from the French company Group Bresson. The company announced that the stores would be converted to the Brico Dépôt format. The first conversions took place in 2014, and the transformation of all 15 former Bricostore stores was completed in September 2015.

In 2016, Kingfisher began adapting the Romanian stores away from the chain's original austere warehouse-style format. The redesigned stores placed greater emphasis on customer assistance, wider home and garden ranges and additional services, after the original warehouse concept proved less suited to the Romanian market.

Kingfisher agreed to acquire Praktiker Romania in 2017 and completed the acquisition in December of that year. Praktiker had operated 27 stores when the acquisition was agreed. Seven locations were subsequently closed, while the remaining 20 were converted to Brico Dépôt. The rebranding was completed in March 2019, bringing the Brico Dépôt network in Romania to 35 stores.

On 18 December 2024, Kingfisher announced an agreement to sell its entire Romanian Brico Dépôt business to Romanian electronics and appliance retailer Altex Romania. At the time of the agreement, the business consisted of 31 stores in 24 cities, together with its distribution operations and head office in Bucharest. The transaction valued the business at an enterprise value of €70 million. The sale was completed on 2 May 2025. Altex retained Brico Dépôt as a specialist DIY and building-materials retail brand alongside its Altex and Media Galaxy retail businesses. In 14 September 2026, Brico Depot has been renamed to Brico in Romania.

== Store concept ==
Brico Dépôt was developed as a low-cost warehouse-style retailer offering a limited range of home-improvement products in large quantities, as an alternative to conventional large-format home-improvement stores. The concept was aimed at both experienced DIY customers and tradespeople, with stores generally smaller and more simply fitted out than traditional Castorama outlets. Merchandise was displayed largely on pallets and industrial shelving, reducing presentation and operating costs.

The format traditionally offered a narrower assortment than a conventional home-improvement store, while maintaining larger quantities of core products. Its range focused on building materials, timber, flooring, sanitary ware, hardware, electrical equipment and tools used in construction and renovation projects.

Although its low-price positioning has been retained, the format has evolved differently between markets. In Romania, for example, the original warehouse concept was modified from 2016 to provide a more conventional retail environment and additional customer services.

=== Product offering and brands ===
The product range has expanded considerably since the development of the original warehouse format. By 2024, Brico Dépôt's French stores carried around 40,000 product references, compared with around 70,000 at Castorama.

Brico Dépôt also sells a number of private label and Kingfisher-exclusive brands. Magnusson, originally developed as a Brico Dépôt France range, specialises primarily in hand tools and was subsequently expanded across the Kingfisher group. Its products carry warranties ranging from five years to a lifetime, depending on the product category.

Titan is Brico Dépôt's private-label range of power and garden tools. After previously being withdrawn, the brand was relaunched in France in 2022 with an initial range of 62 power-tool products. The range was subsequently expanded to include corded, cordless and petrol-powered equipment, as well as pumps and garden machinery.

In May 2019, Kingfisher launched GoodHome as an international own brand covering products and solutions for kitchens, bathrooms, storage, decoration, flooring, heating and other home-improvement projects. GoodHome ranges were introduced across several of the group's retail banners, including Brico Dépôt and Castorama.

== See also ==
- Kingfisher plc
- Castorama
- B&Q
- Screwfix
