= Mobivia Groupe =

French car parts company

Mobivia
- Type: Private
- Industry: Retail
- Headquarters: France
- Area served: Portugal, Spain, Italy, Belgium, Germany, Sweden, Norway, Morocco, Algeria, Tunisia, Ivory Coast
- Products: Car Repairs, Car Accessories and Car Parts
- Website: www.mobivia.com

Mobivia is a French based company group which focuses on car repairs, car accessories and car parts.

Its first store was in France in 1970 near Lille (Englos); during the 1980s the brand expanded its auto centers through France and abroad by entering the Spanish market. In 1986, it also launched its first brand product, Norauto Oil, while in the 1990s, the group expanded to Italy, Portugal, Argentina and Poland with the launch of more new Norauto brand products. In the 2000s, the group also created The Norauto Foundation and signed The European Road Safety Policy and in 2006, they expanded to the Hungarian market. In 2010 the original name Norauto was changed to Mobivia. Norauto remains a Mobivia brand name. In 2013, Norauto officially left Hungary.

The European branch of Midas was acquired by the Mobivia group in 2004. The group acquired the license for Europe, Africa, Turkey, and Brazil in 2014.

== Around the world ==
Country	Established	Stores
Belgium	1966	54
France	1970	410
Spain	1986	100
Italy	1991	38
Portugal	1997	25
Germany	2016	550

Note: Some stores may be under franchise.

== Logo ==
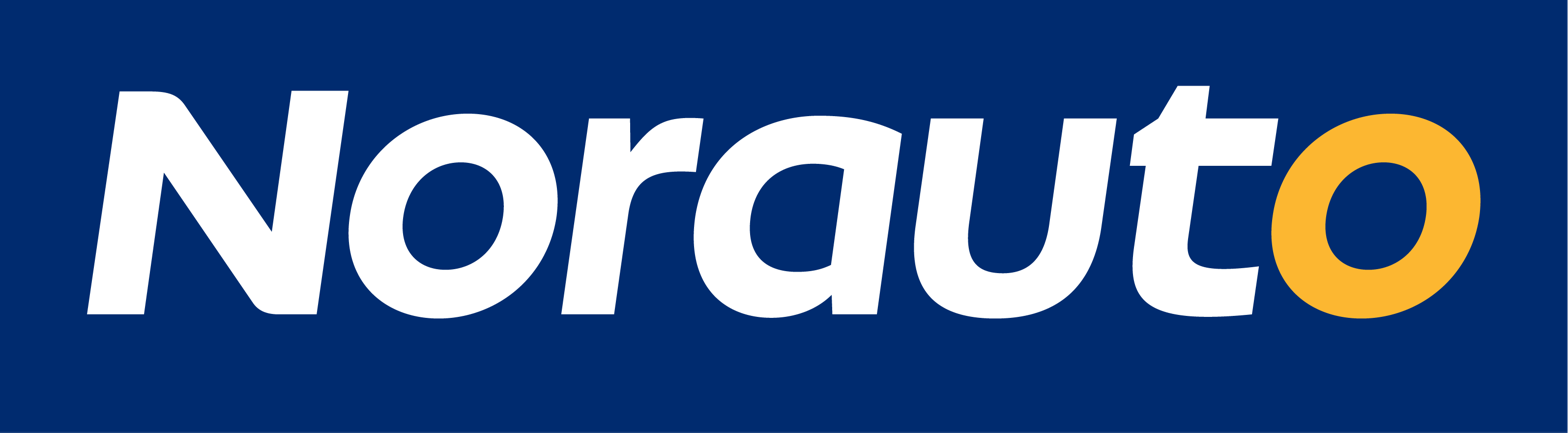
Norauto logo since 2018.

== See also ==
- List of French companies
