= Screwfix =

British hardware store chain owned by Kingfisher plc

Coordinates: 50°56′51″N 2°40′29″W

Screwfix Direct Limited
- Type: Subsidiary
- Industry: Do it yourself; Home improvement; Garden supplies; Kitchens & bathrooms
- Founded: Yeovil — as the Woodscrew Company (1979)
- Founder: Jon Goddard-Watts
- Headquarters: Yeovil, England, UK
- Number of locations: 1,726 (2023)
- Key people: John Mewett (Chief executive officer)
- Products: Screws, power tools, hand tools, fixings & accessories, kitchens & bathrooms, electrical & lighting, building & joinery, heating & plumbing, safety & workwear, security & ironmongery, outdoor & gardening
- Revenue: ▲£2,538 million (2023)
- Number of employees: over 14,000 (2023)
- Parent: Kingfisher plc
- Website: screwfix.com

Screwfix Direct Limited, trading as Screwfix, is a retailer of trade tools, accessories and hardware products based in the United Kingdom. Founded in 1979 as the Woodscrew Supply Company, the company was acquired in July 1999 by Kingfisher plc, which also owns B&Q, and is listed on the London Stock Exchange.

== History ==
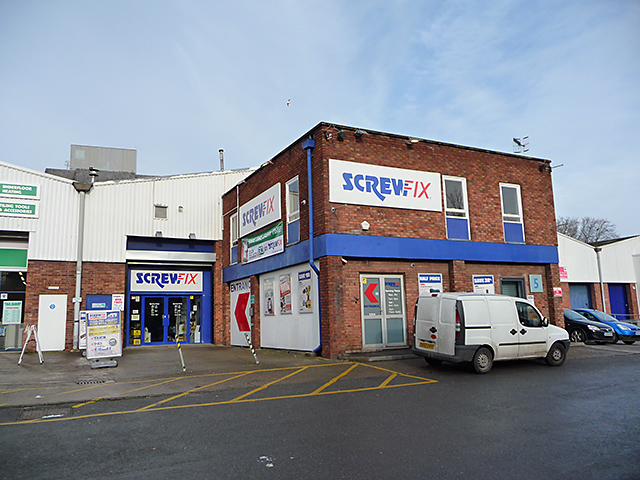
Screwfix store in Bedminster

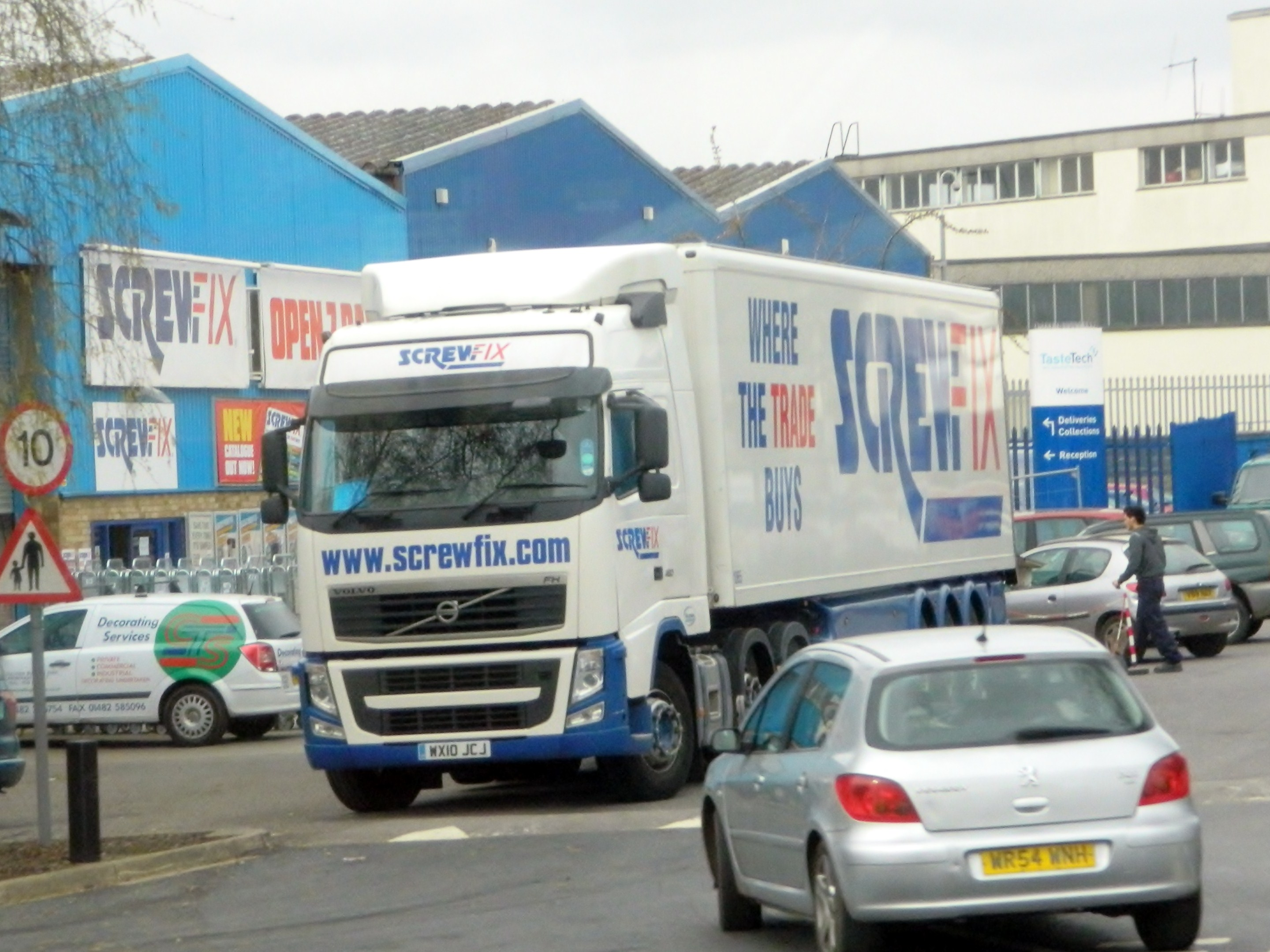
Screwfix Volvo FH distribution lorry in Bristol

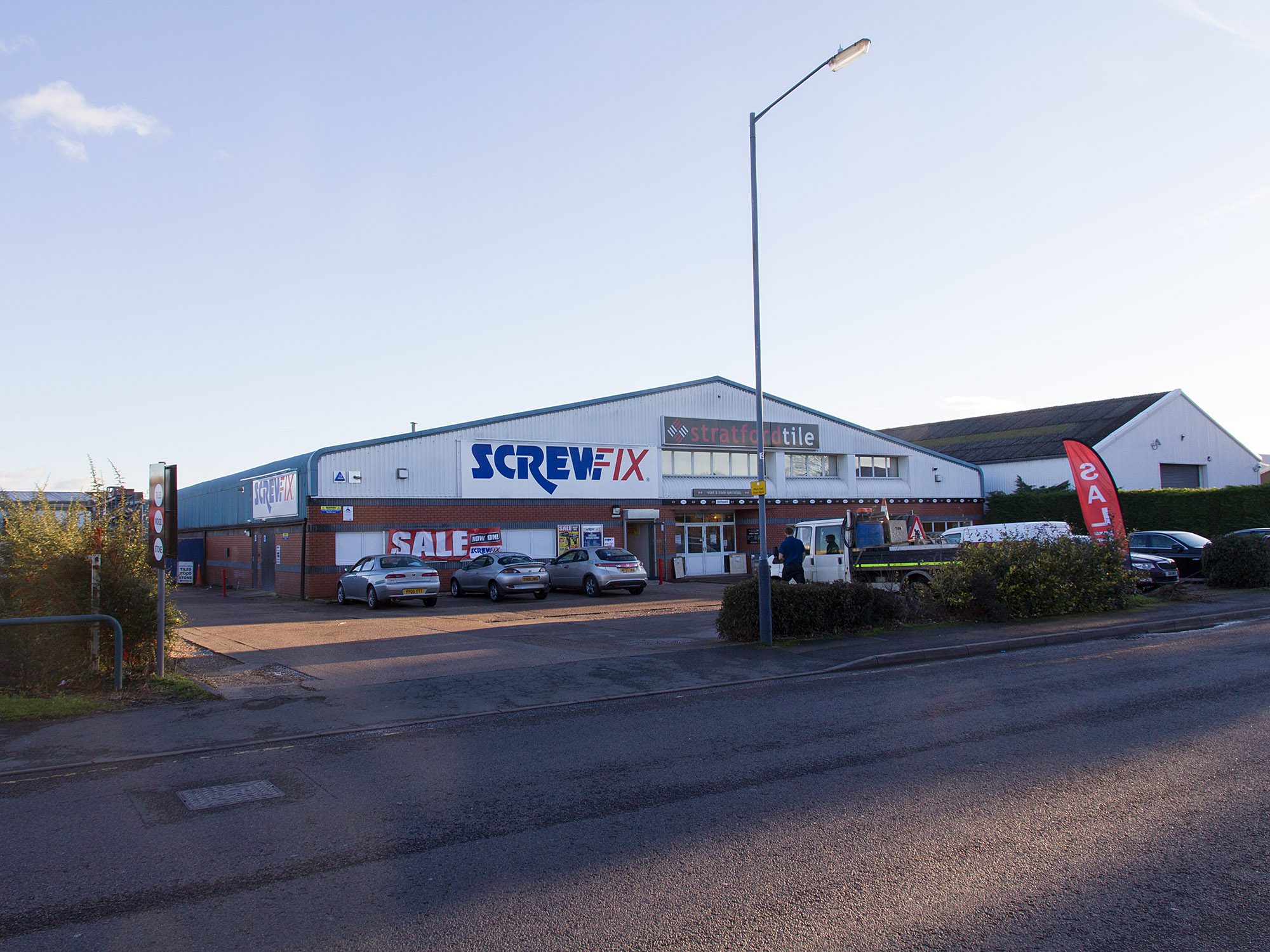
Screwfix store in Stratford-upon-Avon

Based in Yeovil, Somerset, Screwfix began as the Woodscrew Supply Company in 1979. The company’s first mail order catalogue consisted of a single page, solely dedicated to screws; in 1987, this was increased to a four-page version named "Handimail" offering hardware to DIY and trade professionals.

The first catalogue to be produced in the name of Screwfix Direct appeared in 1992, and, with a turnover of £4 million, the company moved into larger premises at Pen Mill, Yeovil, in 1994. In 1998 its turnover increased to £28 million, and the company moved to a purpose-built site at Houndstone Business Park in Yeovil.

The first website was launched in February 1999, five months before the company was acquired by Kingfisher plc, whose holdings at the time included B&Q and Comet. Later that year, the company expanded its site in Houndstone, with the opening of a new contact centre employing five hundred people. In January 2000, Screwfix announced a turnover of £58 million, and trading hours were extended to seven days a week.

In January 2001, turnover first exceeded £100 million, and after further expansion in the contact centre, Screwfix announced sales of £185 million in 2002. The thousandth employee joined the organisation in March 2000, and a month later, next-day deliveries within mainland United Kingdom were introduced.

The company relaunched the website later that year, and was awarded Retailer Of the Year. In September 2004, to continue to meet the increased demand, a fully automated, 325,000 sq ft distribution centre was opened in Trentham, Stoke on Trent, fulfilling next day orders. The Screwfix Community, an online forum, was also launched later that year.

In 2008, the company launched Plumbfix, offering qualified plumbers a wider range of specialist goods at better prices. This was followed by the launch of Electricfix the next year. In July 2011, Screwfix launched its "Click & Collect" service, enabling customers to order and pay securely online, and collect in-store in as little as five minutes.

Also that year, Screwfix's mobile website was set up, providing an easier shopping experience when not at home. Click & Collect was introduced onto this platform in January 2012, since then sales from mobiles have increased by 250%.

By 2013, Screwfix launched its 300th store. In 2014 it opened seven stores in Northern Ireland and four in Germany. Since 2013, the web and mobile site has been extended to include 33,000 products available online, and the contact centre has extended their opening hours to deliver a 24/7 service.

2015 saw the launch of Screwfix's Quickshop app, which allows customers to build their order on their smartphone and generates a QR code which can be scanned at the till point in store.

Screwfix.com and Screwfix app attract up to 7 million visitors per week. The Screwfix Click & Collect service enables customers to purchase supplies online or over the phone, and then collect from store.

In 2016, Screwfix won the "Teleperformance Customer Experience Initiative of the Year" at the Retail Week Awards. In 2018, Screwfix was awarded Retail Week's "Best Retailer over £250m" and "Digital Pioneer".

In 2021 Screwfix Sprint was introduced, allowing customers to place an order on the new Screwfix app and get it delivered straight to their location – either at home or on site – in 60 minutes or less. This service is currently available in over 325 eligible stores, reaching nearly 50% of the UK population. Screwfix Sprint was awarded ‘Best Innovation in Delivery’ at the eCommerce Awards 2023 and ‘Best Customer Experience’ at the Retail Week Awards 2022.

In July of 2022, Screwfix opened its 800th store in Bourton-on-the-Water, Gloucestershire, bringing Screwfix closer to its medium-term target of 1,000 stores across the UK and Republic of Ireland.

Following the launch of its French website in 2021, in 2022 Screwfix opened its first five stores in France, initially located in the Hauts de France region, it now has 20 France stores located in Northern France, with more planned for 2024. In 2023 Screwfix launched its European website, serving customers in Spain, Poland, Netherlands, Austria, Belgium and Sweden.

In March of 2024, Screwfix celebrated the opening of its 900th store in the UK and Ireland in Nottingham.

== Stores ==
As of April 2024, Screwfix operates a network of over 900 stores across the United Kingdom, Ireland and France.

Screwfixs' entire store network is already powered exclusively by renewable electricity, and the retailer has begun to retrofit its existing stores with air source heat pumps. At the end of the 2023/24 financial year, more than 630 Screwfix stores were fitted with the low carbon technology, representing over 60% of the overall total, with more to be rolled out in 2024.

== The Screwfix Foundation ==
In April 2013, Screwfix launched its first charity, the Screwfix Foundation. It supports charity projects involved in fixing, repairing, maintaining, or improving community buildings or facilities for those in need throughout the United Kingdom.

The Screwfix Foundation has donated over £15 million since it was launched (as of February 2025).
