= Bricorama =

French home improvement store chain

- Industry: Home improvement retail
- Founded: 1975
- Headquarters: Noisy-le-Grand, France
- Number of employees: 4,000+
- Parent: Bourrelier Group
- Website: www.bricorama.fr

Bricorama is a home improvement retailer which is based in Noisy-le-Grand, France. The company’s first store was opened in 1975. Today it employs over four thousand people. It is a member of the CAC Small 90.

All mainland European operations of Wickes were sold to Bricorama in June 1997. This was because in December 1996, after financial irregularities were uncovered, management of Wickes believed that the only way to survive the troubles was to concentrate solely on its operations in the United Kingdom other than outside the country.
