= Fnac Darty =

French multinational retail company

Fnac Darty SA
- Type: Public
- Traded as: Euronext Paris: FNAC; CAC Small
- Industry: Retail
- Founded: 1954; 72 years ago
- Headquarters: Ivry-sur-Seine, France
- Number of locations: 987 (2022)
- Key people: Enrique Martinez (president)
- Products: White and brown goods, consumer electronics, personal computing, digital photo processing, Pre-recorded media, furniture
- Brands: Fnac; Darty; Nature & Decouvertes; WeFix; France Billet; BilletRéduc; Vanden Borre; PC.Clinic; Unieuro
- Revenue: €7.949 billion (2022)
- Number of employees: 25,000 (2022)
- Website: fnacdarty.com

Fnac Darty SA, formerly Groupe Fnac S.A., is a multinational retail company headquartered in Ivry-sur-Seine, France. It took its current name after acquiring Darty plc (formerly Kesa Electricals plc and Darty Limited) in 2016.

== History ==
=== Darty ===
In 1957, the Darty family – the father and his three sons, Natan, Marcel and Bernard – managed a small store of textiles. The Darty brothers started to sell stock and, to attract customers, they left the goods on the pavement. Within a few days, the stock was sold. In 1967, the Darty brothers transferred to a larger warehouse.

In 1988, the company proceeded with the repurchase of the business by its employees through a management buyout. The operation was a success, since 90 per cent of employees participated, taking control of 56 per cent of the capital. By the end of 1988, Darty had opened its 100th store. In 1993, Darty was acquired by Kingfisher plc, which integrated Darty and Comet into a European entity based in Paris: Kingfisher Electricals S.A. ('Kesa').

In 1999, Darty opened up a commercial internet site. This entity increased in size through acquisitions and by the beginning of 2003 included Darty and But in France, Comet in the United Kingdom, BCC in the Netherlands, Vanden Borre in Belgium and Datart in the Czech Republic and Slovakia. In 2006, Darty launched DartyBox, an ADSL internet, television and telecommunications provider based on the network of French internet operator Completel.

The company was demerged from Kingfisher plc in 2003. In July 2007, the company bought Menaje Del Hogar, an electrical retail chain based in Spain. On 6 July 2009, the company sold its Swiss operation. In 2012, the company completed the sale of Comet, which they sold for £2 to OpCapita, and paid the purchaser a sweetener of £50 million to take the loss-making venture away.

In 2012, Kesa Electricals was renamed Darty plc. In March 2014, Darty launched its own marketplace (developed by Mirakl) that lists products and services from Darty and third-party vendors. In November 2015, Darty plc reached an agreement to merge with the French retailer Fnac. Kesa Electricals plc, Darty plc and Darty Limited In 2016, Darty announced it had instead agreed to be purchased by Steinhoff International for £673 million through Steinhoff's Conforama subsidiary. Fnac returned with a higher offer, resulting in a bidding war between Fnac and Conforama during April 2016. The Fnac offer was declared unconditional on 19 July 2016, thereby allowing the takeover to be completed.

=== Fnac Darty ===
As of 31 December 2017, Fnac Darty, as the parent company, had 70 subsidiaries (40 in France, 1 in Monaco, and 29 abroad).

In 2019, Fnac Darty acquired Natures & Decouvertes, an outdoor, nature and well-being goods specialist.

== Operations ==
Darty was headquartered in London. It had sourcing offices based in Paris and Hong Kong, as well as a wholly owned wholesaler of electrical accessories, Dacem, which supplied all of Darty's European operations.

Following the takeover by Fnac, Fnac and Darty merged, the Fnac group became Fnac Darty and the Darty headquarters joined the Fnac headquarters in Ivry Sur Seine.

Its structure is as follows:

- Darty: retailer in France; operating 222 stores with 321,800 square metres of selling space
- Vanden Borre & Fnac Belgium: retailer in Belgium; operating 72 stores with 55,600 square metres of selling space

== Shareholders ==
As of 31 December 2024, Fnac Darty's main shareholders were:

Shareholder	Stake (% of ordinary shares)
Vesa Equity Investment (Daniel Křetínský's holding company)	28.28%
Ceconomy	21.95%
GLAS SAS	10.22%
Treasury shares	2.25%
Employee stock ownership	2.14%
Public	35.15%
