= Comet (retailer) =

British electrical retailer

Comet Electricals Limited
- Logo used since 2025 (Note: This logo was first used from 2002 before being replaced in 2010. It was reintroduced in 2025.)
- Trade name: Comet.co.uk
- Formerly: Comet Battery Stores (1933–1939); Comet Radio Services (1939–1969); Comet Radiovision Services (1969–1982); Comet Group plc (1982–2012)
- Type: Private limited company
- Industry: Electrical Retailing
- Founded: 8 August 1933; 93 years ago in Hull, East Yorkshire, England
- Founder: George Hollingbery
- Area served: United Kingdom
- Key people: Cas Paton (CEO)
- Products: White goods; Consumer electronics; Computers
- Parent: OnBuy
- Website: comet.co.uk

Comet Electricals Limited (trading as Comet.co.uk) is a British online marketplace specialising in electrical goods. The company sells consumer electronics and white goods, along with other related products and services.

Originally founded in 1933, Comet operated as one of the United Kingdom's major electrical retail chains until entering administration in 2012.

The brand subsequently returned as an online retailer and was acquired by OnBuy in 2025. On 9 November 2026, Comet was relaunched as an online-only electricals marketplace.

== History ==
=== Early years (1933–1958) ===
Comet was founded in Hull in 1933 by entrepreneur George Hollingbery as Comet Battery Stores. Hollingbery had noticed the increasing popularity of the wireless radio during the 1930s and launched a service which involved himself and one other employee charging batteries in his workshop and delivering them to customers for a small weekly fee.

By 1939, the service had expanded, to around 2,500 customers and a small fleet of vans was required for the deliveries. As customer demand grew for replacement wireless sets, Hollingbery renamed the business to Comet Radio Services and began providing a radio rental service. Comet's first retail store was opened in George Street, Hull in the 1950s. Two more stores were subsequently opened in Bridlington and Driffield.

George Hollingbery died in 1958, aged 55, and his son Michael took control of the business.

=== Pioneering the discount warehouse (1968–69) ===
In 1964, the Resale Prices Act was passed in the United Kingdom, rendering all resale price agreements 'against the public interest' unless proven otherwise. Minimum resale price maintenance (MRPM) had ensured that retailers such as Comet could only sell a product at a price determined by the manufacturer. The abolition of MRPM allowed Comet to make the transition from a small electrical retail chain in Yorkshire to a national discount retailer. In 1968, Comet opened its first out-of-town retail store in Hull, offering a range of 50 radio and television products.

Alan Sugar, the founder of Amstrad, said later that the opening of this discount warehouse "changed the face of retailing." The business was predominantly mail order although members of the public were also able to purchase from the warehouse in person.

Comet placed full page advertisements in specialist magazines and newspapers, listing their stock and the prices, which were between 15% and 45% lower than the manufacturers' recommended retail prices. One such advertisement in The Yorkshire Post resulted in customers "queueing around the block." Sugar said: "This form of retailing signalled the demise of the small electrical shop on the street corner, which simply couldn't compete."

Initially, Comet was the only major retailer offering electrical equipment at heavily discounted prices, and the largest share of its business remained mail order. When competitors such as the G. W. Smith and Laskys chains also began to offer discounted equipment, Comet was compelled to begin opening its own branches nationwide. Comet eventually purchased the Laskys chain outright for £8.9 million in 1989.

In 1969, a second discount warehouse was opened in Leeds, and the company was renamed Comet Radiovision Services.

=== Expansion and flotation (1971–1973) ===
Between February 1971 and July 1972, another seven discount warehouses were opened, including outlets in Edinburgh and Birmingham. A further nine warehouses were expected to be operational by May 1973. Total sales from their warehouses rose from £308,000 from 1968 to 1969, to £5.3 million from 1970 to 1971.

Despite the success of its out-of-town warehouse operations, Comet continued to maintain a presence on the high street, assisted by the consumer boom of the early 1970s ("the Barber Boom"), the introduction of hire purchase facilities, and the growth in the purchase and rental of colour television sets. Comet also traded on its after-sales service, a twice-weekly nationwide delivery service, and its ability to undercut most competitors by around 10%. Goods were sold with 12 months' free service, including parts and labour, and Comet guaranteed that it would beat "any genuine advertised price" for brand new items.

In July 1972, Comet went public with an initial offering of 4.7 million shares at 110p. Michael Hollingbery revealed that inheritance tax had been one of the reasons for the flotation, saying: "If a death had occurred in the family we could have lost control or faced considerable financial problems."

By November 1973, Comet had established 25 discount warehouses in Birmingham, Edinburgh, Glasgow, Grimsby, Hull, Jarrow, Leeds, Leicester, London, Norwich, Newport, Nottingham, Oxford, Reading, Rochdale, Sheffield, Southampton, Stockton-on-Tees, Sunderland, Wigan and Willenhall.

=== Budget booms and busts (1974–1976) ===
The business was impacted badly in 1974 by the three-day week, tighter government controls on hire purchase and consumer credit, and the knock-on effect of a worldwide shortage of steel and plastic.

Relying on fast turnover to compensate for reduced margins (typically the company operated with only a 2% pre-tax margin), Comet was particularly vulnerable to any slump in consumer activity. Where previously it had been able to sell goods "so quickly that they are gone before the manufacturers' invoice has to be met" Comet now found itself having to dramatically revise its sales forecasts and reassess its orders.

Competition from longer-established department stores and high street multiples was also growing, as Currys opened two discount warehouses (under the trading name Bridger Discount), followed by Great Universal Stores and Rediffusion. In September 1974, the group sold its television rental business to Spectra Rentals for £1.73 million, in an effort to reduce its overall debt.

In 1975, Comet expanded its range of goods by purchasing the share capital of Gas Trend, a discount retailer of gas appliances, for £15,000. This placed Comet as the only large multiple retailer of gas appliances to compete against the nationalised British Gas Corporation which accounted for around 80% of the market.

In April 1975, the electrical retail sector underwent a mini boom, following that month's budget announcement, that electrical appliances would be subject to a 25% VAT levy beginning 1 May 1975, a substantial increase from the previous rate of 8%. Although Comet reported sales increases of up to 600% in some of its warehouses, Michael Hollingbery warned that the group would be maintaining only the minimum working stock from 1 May onwards.

Predicting an overall slump in sales of 50% he said: "[After 1 May] there will be a sales trough. What has been happening in the past week has been that people have merely brought forward the purchase they had planned to make later in the year or have realised that certain types of goods that they can afford now may be later out of their grasp." When the levy was reduced the following year to 12.5%, Comet benefited from the corresponding brisk upturn in trade, describing sales as "bumper."

Despite the fall in profits, during the 1975–1976 period, Comet continued with its expansion plans, opening new outlets across the country. By December 1976, the group had grown to 50 outlets, with plans to increase this to 100 by December 1977. In July 1976, Comet acquired the Eclipse Radio and Television Services chain from Loyds Retail, a subsidiary of Philips. Consumer fears of an emergency autumn budget and changes to the Minimum Lending Rate drove Comet's sales to 15% above predictions in late 1976.

=== Bids and buy-out (1981–1984) ===
In June 1981 the Hollingbery family began to reduce its shareholdings in Comet. Valued at £51 million, the group now included 200 Comet Electrical and Timberland Do-It-Yourself outlets, a jewellery manufacturer and a supplier of Polarcold metal pressings for domestic appliance manufacturers. The family disposed of 8 million shares, raising £9.92 million. Michael Hollingbery explained: "Too much of the family wealth was concentrated in one company."

In April 1984 Harris Queensway announced that it was finalising "an agreed bid" of £152 million for the Comet group. The following day, Woolworths (then owned by Paternoster Stores, forerunner of Kingfisher) announced that it had made a £177 million counter-bid, which had been accepted. Hollingbery retained the Comet chair after the sale, which took place in May 1984.

=== Hostile takeover bid for Dixons (1989–1990) ===
In December 1989, Kingfisher announced a £461 million hostile takeover bid for Dixons. Dixons had acquired Currys in 1984, and Kingfisher said that if the bid was successful it would retain both brand names along with Comet. Dixons retaliated by preparing a submission to the Office of Fair Trading (OFT) stating that a merger of Comet, Currys and Dixons would create a monopoly in out-of-town retail parks.

Stanley Kalms, Dixons' chairman, said: "[This] is about a virtual monopoly in retail parks, the fastest growing sector of the business. Out-of-town there are only two competitors, Currys and Comet." Kingfisher claimed that the combined market share of Currys, Dixons and Comet would only represent 22%, below the threshold of 25% which would trigger an investigation by the Monopolies and Merger Commission (MMC), while market researchers assessed the combined share as 26%.

On 16 January 1990 Trade Secretary Nicholas Ridley announced that Kingfisher's bid had been referred to the MMC. He said that the combined market share would have been just under 25% but would have been four times larger than its nearest competitor, Rumbelows. For some products, including personal stereos, microwave ovens and dishwashers, the market share rose to between 30% and 40%.

Ridley said that in the out-of-town sector, the combined group would control 70–80% of the market. There was also concern that the combined group's buying power "would allow it to gain substantial discounts from manufacturers but the lack of competition would mean it would not be under pressure to pass discounts on to the consumer."

On 4 May 1990, the independent market research group Verdict published a report warning that the proposed merger would lead to higher prices and that the dominant position of the combined group would result in the public paying "for the strategic errors made by Britain's leading electrical retailers in the 1980s." The MMC blocked the merger in May 1990.

=== Recession and consumer crisis (1990–1997) ===
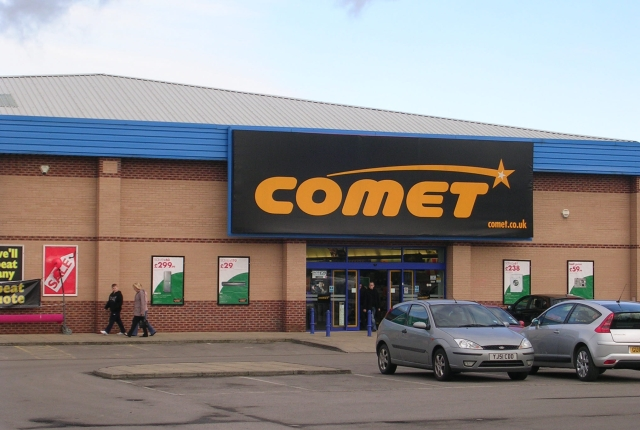
A typical Comet outlet, in Pontefract, West Yorkshire.

In November 1990, following the merger of British Satellite Broadcasting (BSB) and Sky Television to form BSkyB, Comet issued a High Court writ seeking £10 million in damages from BSkyB for breach of contract. Comet alleged that it had a contract with BSB to supply BSB's satellite dishes and receiving equipment – of which Comet had already sold 17,000 units, with several thousand still in stock – which were now obsolete as Sky's equipment, which retailed for £100 less, was being used for all future customers.

In January 1995, market analysts began sounding warnings over the viability of Comet and its sister group Woolworths. Comet had made strategic errors with its home computer business, and its decision to stop selling computer games had allowed competitors to corner the market. Trading at a loss, and with considerable leasehold commitments, analysts suggested that both Comet and Woolworths, with "weak retail strategies" of "cheap and cheerful", might be sold by Kingfisher.

Kingfisher's chairman Sir Geoff Mulcahy, described their performance as "unsatisfactory" and said "We have got two problem areas, Woolworths and Comet." John Richardson, an analyst at NatWest bank, warned that "very substantial rationalisation and reorganisation" was required at Comet.

By April 1996, Dixons controlled a market share three times larger than Comet's. In October 1996, Kingfisher bought out the struggling electrical retailer NORWEB for £29 million, and merged it with Comet. As part of its plan to integrate the two store groups, Comet closed 26 of its own stores and 28 Norweb stores, resulting in 1,200 redundancies.

=== The Wal-Mart effect (1999–2000) ===
In April 1999, Kingfisher attempted a merger with Asda, but was subsequently outbid by Wal-Mart, the world's largest retailer. The £6.7 billion acquisition "sent a ripple of fear through United Kingdom stores". Kingfisher responded by appointing Joe Riordon, former vice-president of Wal-Mart's people division, as managing director of Comet.

Riordan oversaw the launch of a £2 million, 30,000 ft^{2} (2,787 m^{2}) Comet store in Paisley, described as "the blueprint to transform the industry". In effect a carbon copy of Wal-Mart's retail strategy, the move was an attempt to "beat Wal-Mart at its own game... before it has a chance to turn its guns on Comet's sector". Riordan left the company abruptly in April 2000.

In July 2000, Wal-Mart, in what The Times described as "the opening shots in the assault on its British counterparts", announced that it would be discounting some goods by up to 60%. The stock market value of British chain stores fell by around £700 million within days of the announcement.

=== KESA Electricals (2000–2006) ===
In September 2000 Kingfisher revealed its plan to demerge into two listed companies, separating the "poorly performing" Comet and B&Q groups (provisionally called New Kingfisher) from the Superdrug, Woolworths and Big W chains (General Merchandise). The demerger of the electricals business, including Comet and French chains Darty and BUT, delayed in part by "indecision and management infighting," eventually took place in July 2003, with the group renamed KESA Electricals. The name originated from Kingfisher Electricals with the SA taken from Société Anonyme, the French equivalent of plc.

The rapid growth of online shopping during the period 2000–2003 had surprised many analysts. A 2000 report, published by the United Kingdom's Department of Trade and Industry, "Clicks and Mortar: The New Store Fronts," had forecast that United Kingdom online shopping for 2002 could range from £1.2 billion to an optimistic £6.3 billion. The actual figure for 2002 was £7 billion. During 2001–02, e-commerce electrical retailer dabs.com made sales of £116 million, which one analyst pointed out was the equivalent trade of 25 Comet stores. As dabs.com employed only 185 staff, this was described as "a rate of productivity which the mainstream retailer can only dream about."

Although Comet and other retailers established their own websites e-tailers were still able to undercut them because direct shipping of the goods from warehouses to customers cut out the need for large stores, infrastructure and sales staff.

In January 2005, Comet faced increasing pressure, when Tesco announced it would trial non-food stores, retailing electrical goods, CDs and DVDs. Trade magazine Retail Week warned that Tesco would launch a "ferocious assault on the market for digital cameras and music players," one of the few growth areas in the sector.

In September 2005, Comet posted a second quarter loss of £3.3 million. Jean-Noel Labroue, KESA's chief executive, said: "Trading across our core markets since the end of July has not improved. In view of the continuing decline in consumer confidence across all our markets, we do not anticipate any changes to these conditions in the immediate future." A management buy-out negotiation reached "an advanced stage" but was ultimately abandoned.

A £1.7 billion takeover bid was made for KESA in 2006. KESA would not confirm the identity of the bidders when they announced that the offer had been rejected on the grounds that it "undervalued the company and its prospects."

=== Great Recession ===
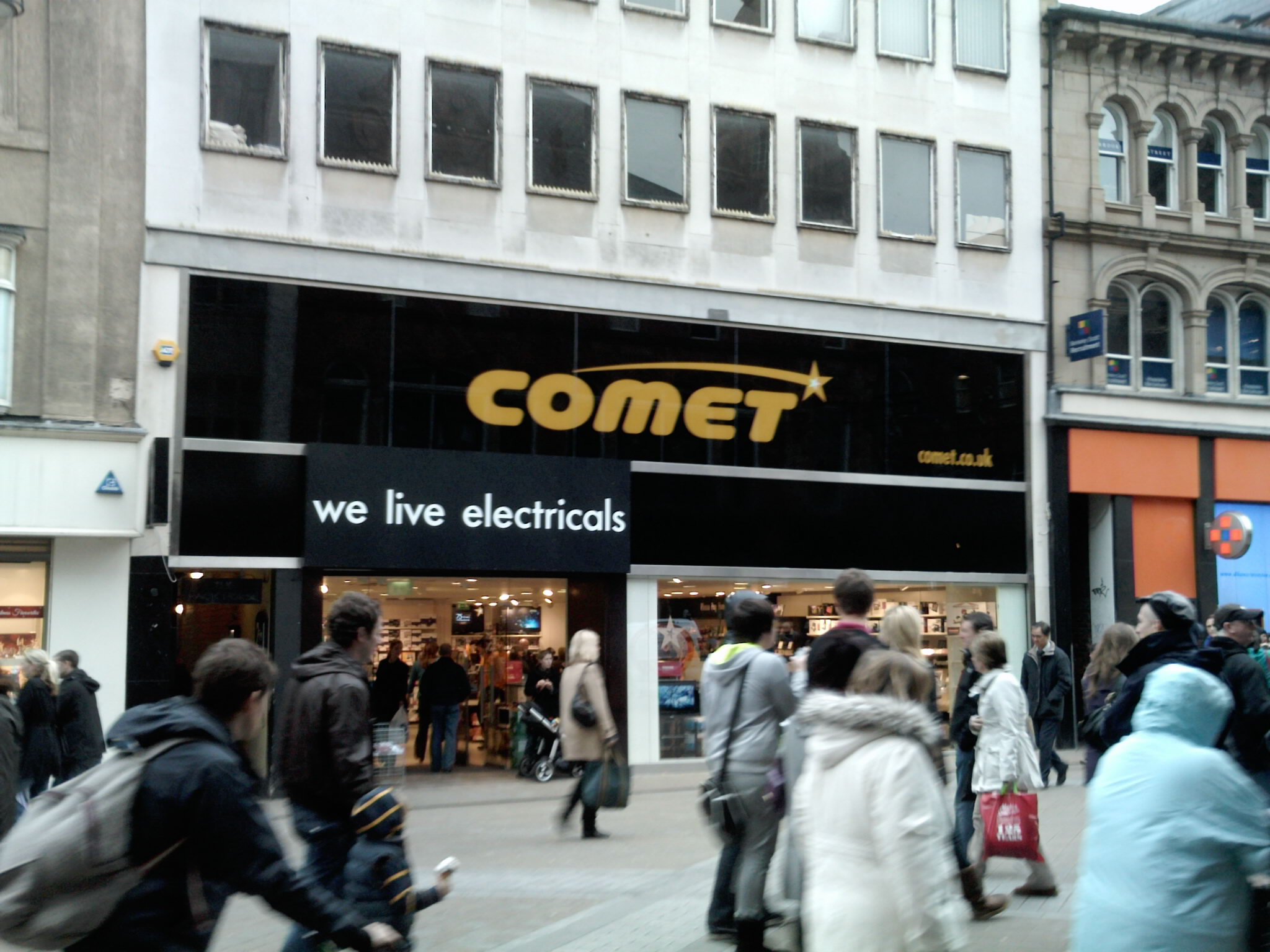
In the late 2000s, Comet experimented with High Street branches such as this on Briggate in Leeds. They were closed shortly afterwards.

In September 2007, just before the 2008 financial crisis, KESA warned that its prospects in the United Kingdom were "uncertain" as the credit crunch and higher interest rates could lead to consumers cutting back their spending on new electrical products. Analysts at Landsbanki said: "[W]e see serious long run threats to electrical retailing from the growth of the internet, the proliferation of competition and the resultant downward pressure on prices and margins."

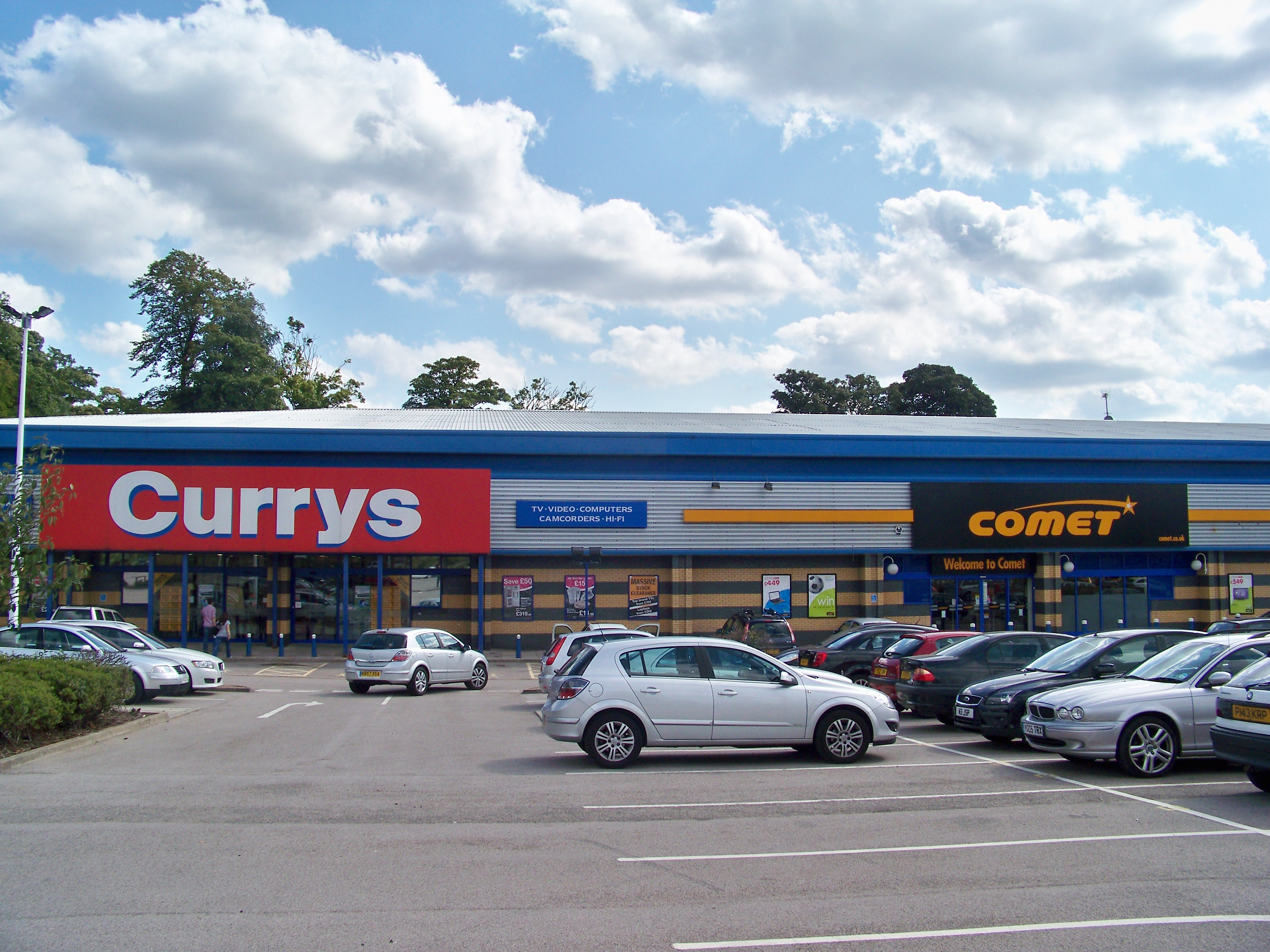
A Comet branch next to rivals Currys in Guiseley, West Yorkshire.

In June 2009, KESA posted a pre tax loss of £81.8 million in the 12 months to 30 April 2009, compared to a profit of £128.8 million in the previous year. Over the same period, Comet's retail profit fell by 76.5% to £10.1 million. In April 2010, United States-based Best Buy, the world's largest electrical goods retailer, opened its first store in Thurrock, Essex, with a plan to open one hundred out-of-town warehouses over the following four years.

In September 2010, a new logo was launched, similar to the previous logo, but "softer" in design. The Comet name was in lowercase, and accompanied by a new strapline, "Come and Play". The branding aimed to project a more fun and friendly image, and customers were encouraged to come into the store to try out interactive displays.

Higher taxes, wage freezes and the rising cost of food and essential purchases combined to keep consumer spending on discretionary purchases low and in June 2011 Comet posted a loss – its first in 16 years – of £8.9 million. The "brutal consumer recession" had, said retail analyst Neil Saunders, left the market "in quite a steep decline and with consumers not buying in the way they had the previous decade."

In November 2011, in the same week that Best Buy announced that it was closing its eleven United Kingdom stores due to "tough conditions," KESA announced that it had sold Comet to investment firm OpCapita for a nominal £2. KESA would also provide a £46.8 million 'dowry' of working capital, and retain all the pension liabilities for employees on pre-existing defined benefit schemes.

Two weeks before the firm entered administration, OpCapita announced they were exploring options to sell the chain, after only twelve months of ownership.

=== Administration and closure ===
On 1 November 2012, Comet announced it was filing for administration, and entered administration the following day. Deloitte were appointed to act as administrators for the chain. A spokesman said: "The board is urgently working with its advisers to seek a solution to secure a viable future for the company." This followed a period of "increasing pressure" from suppliers who insisted the retailer pay in advance for stock before the Christmas trading period.

After the announcement, the Comet website became unavailable to visitors until 3 November 2012, when a liquidation sale promotion was published. The new website gave details of store locations, but the e-commerce system was no longer available. On 8 November 2012, at 09:00, Comet stores started their final liquidation stock sale. Also, as of 8 November, Comet was accepting again all of its own gift cards excluding corporate customers.

On 17 November 2012, administrators appointed for Comet announced that at least 41 out of the retailer's 236 stores would be closed, if they failed to sign any potential buyer to take them over by end of the month. The announcement immediately triggered closing sales in 27 of the outlets and 14 others were awaiting closing sales. Up to 500 Comet employees were not reported to be directly affected in the 27 stores with closing sales. The closures continued over the next month, until there were no stores remaining open by the end of December 2012.

In June 2014, former staff, represented by the Union of Shop, Distributive and Allied Workers and the United Road Transport Union, won an Employment Tribunal case that they had not been consulted properly about redundancy by Comet and the administrators, Deloitte. This enabled about 7,000 former staff to apply for redundancy financial assistance. Accounting records suggested that the owners, including OpCapita and Elliott Advisors, recovered about £117 million from Comet, and administration fees were more than £10 million.

Three administrators from Deloitte were referred to the accountancy regulator by the Insolvency Service over the failure to consult properly about redundancy, which led to government costs of about £26 million for redundancy payments.

=== Misco Brand Purchase and Subsequent sale ===
In December 2019, The UK Computer Group (later Misco Technologies) bought the rights to the Comet intellectual property and website from Deloitte.

In May 2025 the online marketplace OnBuy acquired the Comet brand from Misco Technologies. OnBuy announced that Comet was to be relaunched as a UK electronics marketplace.

=== Comet.co.uk (2026–present) ===
On 9 November 2026, Comet was relaunched as an online-only marketplace specialising in electrical goods. The Comet website was reported to offer more than one million products from 2,500 sellers across categories that include televisions, computing, mobile phones, gaming and household appliances.

The relaunch followed a £10 million investment. The business is operated by OnCommerce, the marketplace technology business behind OnBuy.com and easyShop.com (part of easyGroup).

Comet CEO Cas Paton said the company was also considering click-and-collect partnerships, although no physical retail partnership had been announced at the time of the relaunch.
