= Castorama =

French multinational hardware store chain owned by British Kingfisher plc

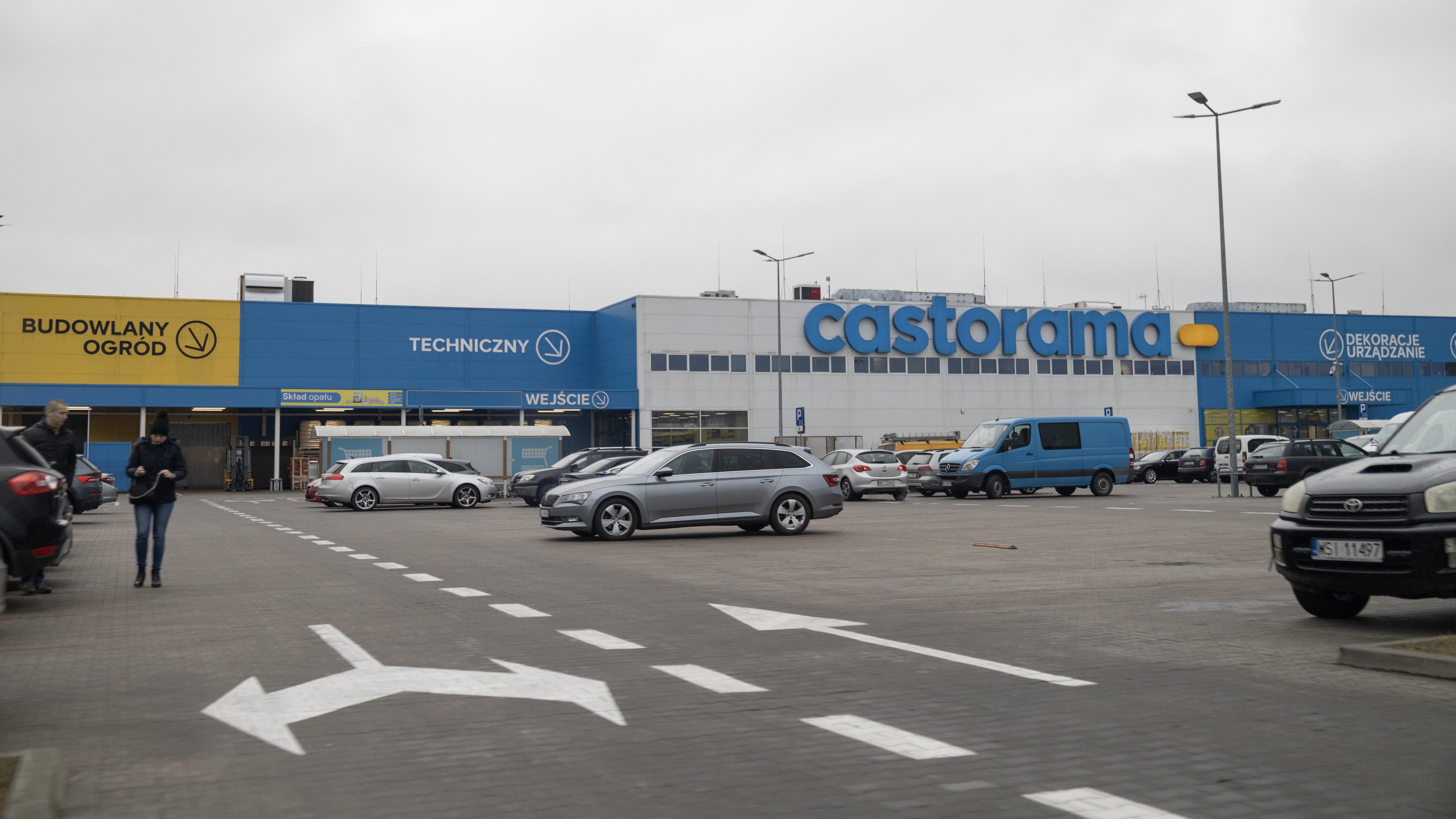
- Castorama in Siedlce, Poland
- Company type: Private
- Industry: Retail
- Founded: 13 June 1969; 56 years ago in Lille, France
- Headquarters: Templemars, France
- Key people: Marc Tenart (CEO)
- Products: DIY, home improvement tools, gardening Supplies and Plants
- Revenue: £2,246 million (2018/2019) (France) £1,431 million (2018/2019) (Poland)
- Parent: Kingfisher plc
- Website: www.castorama.fr

Castorama (French pronunciation: [kastoʁama]) is a French retailer of DIY and home improvement tools and supplies, headquartered in Templemars, France, and is part of the British group Kingfisher plc, which has 101 stores in France and 90 in Poland. The company became a subsidiary of Kingfisher plc in May 2002, along with Castorama's own subsidiary Brico Dépôt.

Some outlets have been converted or relocated under the Brico Dépôt format "DIY warehouse", based on the B&Q Warehouse fascia in the United Kingdom. In February 2009, Kingfisher sold 31 stores of Castorama in Italy to French retailer Leroy Merlin.

In 1969, Christian Dubois founded in Englos, near Lille, France's first large-scale (5000 m^{2}) DIY store. The rapid expansion of the chain meant that 20 years later Castorama had 80 stores in France.

A second store opened in 1972, followed by a third in 1973. In 1975, Castorama set up shop in Plaisir (Yvelines), outside its home region. In 1977, Castorama launched its famous slogan "Chez Casto, y a tout ce qu'il faut!", a phrase coined by Lucky Blondo and taken up two years later by Pierre Perret.
