= Hubo =

Hubo or HUBO may refer to:

- HUBO, a walking humanoid robot developed by the Korea Advanced Institute of Science and Technology
- Hubo Netherlands, a Dutch hardware store chain
- Hubo Belgium, a Belgian hardware store chain
- Hubometer, an axle-mounted distance measuring device
