= 2016 Supercar Challenge =

Seasons
- ← 2015 2017 →

The 2016 Supercar Challenge powered by Pirelli was the sixteenth Supercar Challenge season since it replaced the Supercar Cup in 2001. It began at Circuit Zolder on April 16 and ended at TT Circuit Assen on October 23.

== Calendar ==
Due to noise restrictions the Supercar Challenge would not be competing at Zandvoort during the Opening Races on April 8 to April 10. As a replacement the Supercar Challenge went to Zolder on April 15 to April 17 during the New Race Festival. The event at the Slovakia Ring was moved a week from the original date before being replaced by Snetterton after all.

Round	Circuit	Date	Classes	Event	Notes
1	Circuit Zolder, Belgium	16–17 April	All	New Race Festival	The GT and Sport classes race combined, but the Superlights classes have separate races.
2	Motorsport Arena Oschersleben, Germany	20–22 May	Super GT / GTB; Supersport / Sport	Preis de Stadt Magdeburg	All of the present classes race combined.
3	Circuit de Spa-Francorchamps, Belgium	11–12 June	Super GT / GTB; Supersport / Sport	Spa Euro Races	All of the present classes race combined.
4	Circuit Zolder, Belgium	1–3 July	All	Zolder Superprix powered by Pirelli	The GT and Superlights classes race combined, but the Sport classes have separate races.
5	TT Circuit Assen, Netherlands	5–7 August	All	Gamma Racing Day	The GT and Superlights classes race combined, but the Sport classes have separate races.
6	Snetterton Circuit, United Kingdom	2–4 September	Super GT / GTB; Supersport / Sport	Dutch on Tour	All of the present classes race combined.
7	Circuit de Spa-Francorchamps, Belgium	8–9 October	Super GT / GTB; Supersport / Sport	Racing Festival Spa	All of the present classes race combined.
8	TT Circuit Assen, Netherlands	21–23 October	All	Formido Finaleraces	The GT and Superlights classes race combined, but the Sport classes have separate races.

== Entry list ==
Team	Car	No.	Drivers	Class	Rounds
(Netherlands) / Day-V-Tec (Note: Cars No. 1, 105, 509, 705, 706, 707 and 715 entered as Day-V-Tec and car No. 103 entered as Volvo Reede Racing by Day-V-Tec.); (Netherlands) / Volvo Reede Racing by Day-V-Tec	Ligier JS P3	1	(Netherlands) Max Koebolt	SQD	7
(Netherlands) / Day-V-Tec; (Netherlands) / Volvo Reede Racing by Day-V-Tec	Ligier JS P3	1	(Netherlands) Nigel Melker	SQD	7
(Netherlands) / Day-V-Tec; (Netherlands) / Volvo Reede Racing by Day-V-Tec	Volvo S60 V8	103	(Netherlands) Henry Zumbrink	SGT	1–5, 7–8
(Netherlands) / Day-V-Tec; (Netherlands) / Volvo Reede Racing by Day-V-Tec	Ligier JS P3	105	(Netherlands) Milan Dontje	SGT	1, 3
(Netherlands) / Day-V-Tec; (Netherlands) / Volvo Reede Racing by Day-V-Tec	Ligier JS P3	105	(Netherlands) Indy Dontje	SGT	1
(Netherlands) / Day-V-Tec; (Netherlands) / Volvo Reede Racing by Day-V-Tec	Ligier JS P3	105	(Netherlands) Frits van Eerd	SGT	3 (R1)
(Netherlands) / Day-V-Tec; (Netherlands) / Volvo Reede Racing by Day-V-Tec	Ligier JS P3	105	(Netherlands) Jan Lammers	SGT	3 (R2)
(Netherlands) / Day-V-Tec; (Netherlands) / Volvo Reede Racing by Day-V-Tec	BMW 135i (E82)	509	(Netherlands) Niels Kool	Sport	All
(Netherlands) / Day-V-Tec; (Netherlands) / Volvo Reede Racing by Day-V-Tec	BMW 135i (E82)	509	(Netherlands) Bart Drost	Sport	1–3, 5–8
(Netherlands) / Day-V-Tec; (Netherlands) / Volvo Reede Racing by Day-V-Tec	Ligier JS P3	705	(Netherlands) Frits van Eerd	SL1	5
(Netherlands) / Day-V-Tec; (Netherlands) / Volvo Reede Racing by Day-V-Tec	Ligier JS P3	705	(Netherlands) Jan Lammers	SL1	5
(Netherlands) / Day-V-Tec; (Netherlands) / Volvo Reede Racing by Day-V-Tec	Ligier JS P3	706	(Netherlands) Milan Dontje	SL1	5
(Netherlands) / Day-V-Tec; (Netherlands) / Volvo Reede Racing by Day-V-Tec	Ligier JS P3	706	(Netherlands) Nigel Melker	SL1	5
(Netherlands) / Day-V-Tec; (Netherlands) / Volvo Reede Racing by Day-V-Tec	Ligier JS P3	706	(Netherlands) Frits van Eerd	SL1	8
(Netherlands) / Day-V-Tec; (Netherlands) / Volvo Reede Racing by Day-V-Tec	Ligier JS P3	706	(Netherlands) Jan Lammers	SL1	8
(Netherlands) / Day-V-Tec; (Netherlands) / Volvo Reede Racing by Day-V-Tec	Ligier JS P3	707	(Netherlands) Nigel Melker	SL1	8
(Netherlands) / Day-V-Tec; (Netherlands) / Volvo Reede Racing by Day-V-Tec	Ligier JS P3	715	(Netherlands) Indy Dontje	SL1	1
(Netherlands) / Day-V-Tec; (Netherlands) / Volvo Reede Racing by Day-V-Tec	Ligier JS P3	715	(Netherlands) Milan Dontje	SL1	1
(Netherlands) / Rapide Racing (Note: Car No. 104 entered as Rapide Racing, cars No. 311, 345, 365, 408, 414, 416 and 441 entered as JR Motorsport, car No. 325 entered as SDW Shipping by JR Motorsport and car No. 402 entered as Van de Pas Racing/Munckhof Racing.); (Netherlands) / JR Motorsport; (Netherlands) / SDW Shipping by JR Motorsport; (Netherlands) / Van de Pas Racing/Munckhof Racing	Mercedes-Benz SLS AMG GT3	104	(Netherlands) Bob Herber	SGT	1, 5
(Netherlands) / Rapide Racing; (Netherlands) / JR Motorsport; (Netherlands) / SDW Shipping by JR Motorsport; (Netherlands) / Van de Pas Racing/Munckhof Racing	BMW M4 Silhouette	311	(Belgium) Ward Sluys	GTB	All
(Netherlands) / Rapide Racing; (Netherlands) / JR Motorsport; (Netherlands) / SDW Shipping by JR Motorsport; (Netherlands) / Van de Pas Racing/Munckhof Racing	BMW M4 Silhouette	311	(Belgium) Chris Mattheus	GTB	1–5, 7–8
(Netherlands) / Rapide Racing; (Netherlands) / JR Motorsport; (Netherlands) / SDW Shipping by JR Motorsport; (Netherlands) / Van de Pas Racing/Munckhof Racing	BMW M4 Silhouette	311	(Netherlands) Michael Verhagen	GTB	6
(Netherlands) / Rapide Racing; (Netherlands) / JR Motorsport; (Netherlands) / SDW Shipping by JR Motorsport; (Netherlands) / Van de Pas Racing/Munckhof Racing	BMW M4 Silhouette	325	(Netherlands) Koen Bogaerts	GTB	3–5
(Netherlands) / Rapide Racing; (Netherlands) / JR Motorsport; (Netherlands) / SDW Shipping by JR Motorsport; (Netherlands) / Van de Pas Racing/Munckhof Racing	BMW M4 Silhouette	325	(Netherlands) Mark van der Aa	GTB	3, 5
(Netherlands) / Rapide Racing; (Netherlands) / JR Motorsport; (Netherlands) / SDW Shipping by JR Motorsport; (Netherlands) / Van de Pas Racing/Munckhof Racing	BMW M4 Silhouette	325	(Netherlands) Pieter van Soelen	GTB	4
(Netherlands) / Rapide Racing; (Netherlands) / JR Motorsport; (Netherlands) / SDW Shipping by JR Motorsport; (Netherlands) / Van de Pas Racing/Munckhof Racing	BMW M4 Silhouette	345	(Netherlands) Bob Herber	GTB	7
(Netherlands) / Rapide Racing; (Netherlands) / JR Motorsport; (Netherlands) / SDW Shipping by JR Motorsport; (Netherlands) / Van de Pas Racing/Munckhof Racing	BMW M4 Silhouette	345	(Netherlands) Daan Meijer	GTB	7
(Netherlands) / Rapide Racing; (Netherlands) / JR Motorsport; (Netherlands) / SDW Shipping by JR Motorsport; (Netherlands) / Van de Pas Racing/Munckhof Racing	BMW M4 Silhouette	365	(Netherlands) Bas Schouten	GTB	8 (R1)
(Netherlands) / Rapide Racing; (Netherlands) / JR Motorsport; (Netherlands) / SDW Shipping by JR Motorsport; (Netherlands) / Van de Pas Racing/Munckhof Racing	BMW M4 Silhouette	365	(Netherlands) Michael Verhagen	GTB	8 (R2)
(Netherlands) / Rapide Racing; (Netherlands) / JR Motorsport; (Netherlands) / SDW Shipping by JR Motorsport; (Netherlands) / Van de Pas Racing/Munckhof Racing	BMW Z4 Coupé (E86)	402	(Netherlands) Eric van den Munckhof	SS	1–7 (Note: Eric van den Munckhof crashed during Race 1 at the Spa Euro Races causing the Van de Pas Racing/Munckhof Racing team to withdraw the No. 402 car, because the damage could not be fixed in time for the race on Sunday. Van den Munckhof was able to team up with Joris Schouten in the No. 416 JR Motorsport car for Race 2. Joris' teammate Bas Schouten moved to the No. 408 JR Motorsport car to team up with Ted van Vliet to make place for Van den Munckhof. Van den Munckhof also crashed during Race 1 at the Gamma Racing Day and teamed up with Daan Meijer in the No. 414 JR Motorsport car for Race 2.)
(Netherlands) / Rapide Racing; (Netherlands) / JR Motorsport; (Netherlands) / SDW Shipping by JR Motorsport; (Netherlands) / Van de Pas Racing/Munckhof Racing	BMW M3 (E92)	408	(Netherlands) Ted van Vliet	SS	1, 3–4, 6–8
(Netherlands) / Rapide Racing; (Netherlands) / JR Motorsport; (Netherlands) / SDW Shipping by JR Motorsport; (Netherlands) / Van de Pas Racing/Munckhof Racing	BMW M3 (E92)	408	(Netherlands) Bas Schouten	SS	3 (R2)
(Netherlands) / Rapide Racing; (Netherlands) / JR Motorsport; (Netherlands) / SDW Shipping by JR Motorsport; (Netherlands) / Van de Pas Racing/Munckhof Racing	BMW M3 GTR (E46)	414	(Netherlands) Daan Meijer	SS	5
(Netherlands) / Rapide Racing; (Netherlands) / JR Motorsport; (Netherlands) / SDW Shipping by JR Motorsport; (Netherlands) / Van de Pas Racing/Munckhof Racing	BMW M3 GTR (E46)	414	(Netherlands) Eric van den Munckhof	SS	5 (R2)
(Netherlands) / Rapide Racing; (Netherlands) / JR Motorsport; (Netherlands) / SDW Shipping by JR Motorsport; (Netherlands) / Van de Pas Racing/Munckhof Racing	BMW M3 WTCC (E90)	416	(Netherlands) Joris Schouten	SS	3
(Netherlands) / Rapide Racing; (Netherlands) / JR Motorsport; (Netherlands) / SDW Shipping by JR Motorsport; (Netherlands) / Van de Pas Racing/Munckhof Racing	BMW M3 WTCC (E90)	416	(Netherlands) Bas Schouten	SS	3 (R1)
(Netherlands) / Rapide Racing; (Netherlands) / JR Motorsport; (Netherlands) / SDW Shipping by JR Motorsport; (Netherlands) / Van de Pas Racing/Munckhof Racing	BMW M3 WTCC (E90)	416	(Netherlands) Eric van den Munckhof	SS	3 (R2)
(Netherlands) / Rapide Racing; (Netherlands) / JR Motorsport; (Netherlands) / SDW Shipping by JR Motorsport; (Netherlands) / Van de Pas Racing/Munckhof Racing	BMW M3 GTR (E46)	441	(Netherlands) Bob Herber	SS	4
(Netherlands) / Rapide Racing; (Netherlands) / JR Motorsport; (Netherlands) / SDW Shipping by JR Motorsport; (Netherlands) / Van de Pas Racing/Munckhof Racing	BMW M3 GTR (E46)	441	(Netherlands) Martin Lanting	SS	4
(Italy) Martino Rosso Racing	Ferrari 458 Italia GT2	108	(Netherlands) Martin Lanting	SGT	5
(Netherlands) Cor Euser Racing	Marcos Marcorelly	112	(Netherlands) Cor Euser	SGT	8
(Netherlands) Cor Euser Racing	Marcos Marcorelly	112	(United Kingdom) Trevor Knight	SGT	8
(Netherlands) Cor Euser Racing	Marcos Mantis	322	(France) Denis Allemang	GTB	3
(Netherlands) Cor Euser Racing	Marcos Mantis	322	(Netherlands) Cor Euser	GTB	3
(United Kingdom) RAW Motorsports	Radical RXC Turbo GT3	127	(United Kingdom) Rob Wheldon	SGT	6, 8
(United Kingdom) RAW Motorsports	Radical RXC Turbo GT3	127	(United Kingdom) Tom Ashton	SGT	6
(United Kingdom) RAW Motorsports	Radical RXC Turbo GT3	127	(United Kingdom) Steve Burgess	SGT	8
(Spain) Escuela Española de Pilotos	Mosler MT900 GT3	153	(Spain) Oliver Campos-Hull	SGT	1–4, 6–8
(Spain) Escuela Española de Pilotos	Mosler MT900 GT3	153	(Greece) Kosta Kanaroglou	SGT	1–4, 6–8
(Spain) Escuela Española de Pilotos	Mosler MT900 GT3	154	(Spain) Alberto de Martín	SGT	1–5
(Spain) Escuela Española de Pilotos	Mosler MT900 GT3	154	(United Kingdom) Ben Clucas	SGT	1, 3
(Spain) Escuela Española de Pilotos	Mosler MT900 GT3	154	(Portugal) Pedro Salvador	SGT	2, 4–5
(Spain) Escuela Española de Pilotos	Ginetta G50 GT4	453	(Spain) Manuel Cintrano	SS	8
(Spain) Escuela Española de Pilotos	Ginetta G50 GT4	453	(Spain) Javier Morcillo	SS	8
GT3 Poland	Lamborghini Huracán Super Trofeo	155	(Poland) Andrzej Lewandowski	SGT	3
GT3 Poland	Lamborghini Huracán Super Trofeo	155	(Poland) Teodor Myszkowski	SGT	3
(Netherlands) Pumaxs Racing	Pumaxs RT	171	(Netherlands) Henk Thuis	SGT	1–3, 5, 7–8
(Luxembourg) Prime Racing	Ginetta-Juno LMP3	172	(Luxembourg) Jean-Pierre Lequeux	SGT	1, 3–5, 7
(Luxembourg) Prime Racing	Ginetta-Juno LMP3	172	(Belgium) Sam Dejonghe	SGT	1
(Luxembourg) Prime Racing	Ginetta-Juno LMP3	172	(Luxembourg) Jean-Marc Ueberecken	SGT	7
(Luxembourg) Prime Racing	Ginetta-Juno LMP3	711	(Belgium) Sam Dejonghe	SL1	1
(Luxembourg) Prime Racing	Ginetta-Juno LMP3	711	(Luxembourg) Jean-Pierre Lequeux	SL1	1
(Netherlands) BlueBerry Racing	Mosler MT900R GT3	173	(Netherlands) Berry van Elk	SGT	2–7
(Netherlands) BlueBerry Racing	Phantom SF11	174	(Netherlands) Berry van Elk	SGT	1
(Netherlands) BlueBerry Racing	Praga R1	370	(United Kingdom) Fiona James	GTB	2, 6
(Netherlands) BlueBerry Racing	BMW M3 (E46)	444	(Netherlands) Luuk van Loon	SS	All
(Netherlands) BlueBerry Racing	BMW M3 (E46)	444	(Netherlands) Ronald van Loon	SS	All
(Netherlands) BlueBerry Racing	Praga R1	770	(United Kingdom) Fiona James	SL2	1, 4–5
(Netherlands) BlueBerry Racing	Praga R1	770	(Netherlands) Paul Sieljes	SL2	8
(Netherlands) BlueBerry Racing	Praga R1	771	(Netherlands) Paul Sieljes	SL2	1
(Netherlands) BlueBerry Racing	Praga R1	771	(Netherlands) Danny van Dongen	SL2	4
(Netherlands) BlueBerry Racing	Praga R1	771	(Netherlands) Cor Euser	SL2	5
(Spain) Monlau Competición	Renault R.S. 01 GT3	190	(Spain) José Manuel Pérez-Aicart	SGT	3–4
(Spain) Monlau Competición	Renault R.S. 01 GT3	190	(Belgium) Jürgen Smet	SGT	3–4
(United Kingdom) VR Motorsport	Praga R1 Turbo	196	(United Kingdom) Tim Gray	SGT	6
(United Kingdom) VR Motorsport	Praga R1 Turbo	196	(United Kingdom) Oliver Hewitt	SGT	6
(Netherlands) Van Berlo Racing	Porsche 997 GT3 Cup	304	(Netherlands) Marcel van Berlo	GTB	3, 5, 7
(Belgium) DVB Racing	Porsche 991 GT3 Cup	307	(Belgium) Manu Van de Ryse	GTB	3
(Belgium) DVB Racing	Porsche 991 GT3 Cup	307	(Belgium) Nicolas Vandierendonck	GTB	3
(Belgium) DVB Racing	Porsche 997 GT3 Cup	382	(Turkey) Cengiz Oguzhan	GTB	5
(Belgium) DVB Racing	Porsche 997 GT3 Cup	383	(Turkey) Cenk Ceyisakar	GTB	5, 8
(Belgium) DVB Racing	Porsche 997 GT3 Cup	384	(Turkey) Yadel Oskan	GTB	8
(Netherlands) Topper Team	Porsche 997 GT3 Cup	309	(Netherlands) Dirk Schulz	GTB	3, 5, 7
(Netherlands) Topper Team	Porsche 997 GT3 Cup	309	(Netherlands) Jan-Marc Schulz	GTB	3
(Netherlands) Topper Team	Porsche 997 GT3 Cup	309	(Netherlands) Sebastiaan Bleekemolen	GTB	7
(Netherlands) Topper Team	Porsche 996 GT3 Cup	399	(Netherlands) Jan-Marc Schulz	GTB	5
(Netherlands) Team RaceArt	Porsche 991 GT3 Cup	317	(Netherlands) Roger Grouwels	GTB	1, 4–5
(Netherlands) Team RaceArt	Porsche 991 GT3 Cup	318	(Netherlands) Hans Fabri	GTB	1, 4–5
(Germany) AKF Motorsport	Renault Mégane Trophy (II)	324	(Germany) Oliver Freymuth	GTB	2–3
(Belgium) JJ Racing	Porsche 997 GT3 Cup	326	(Belgium) Jos Jansen	GTB	All
(Netherlands) Power Race Products	Porsche 997 GT3 Cup	327	(Netherlands) Thijs Heezen	GTB	8
(Netherlands) Power Race Products	Porsche 997 GT3 Cup	327	(Netherlands) Jos Menten	GTB	8
(Netherlands) Power Race Products	Norma BMW	716	(Germany) Siggi Pfeiffer	SL1	8
(France) Team Roscar	Porsche 997 GT3 Cup	328	(Switzerland) Thomas Winkler	GTB	7
(France) Team Roscar	Porsche 997 GT3 Cup	329	(Switzerland) Tomas Pfister	GTB	7
(France) Team Roscar	Porsche 997 GT3 Cup	329	(Switzerland) Alfred Winkler	GTB	7
(France) Team Roscar	Porsche 997 GT3 Cup	346	(France) Serge Incorvaia	GTB	7
(France) Team Roscar	Porsche 997 GT3 Cup	346	(France) Olivier Montgermont	GTB	7
(France) Team Roscar	Porsche 997 GT3 Cup	371	(France) Pascal Burgart	GTB	7
(France) Team Roscar	Porsche 997 GT3 Cup	371	(France) David Sarny	GTB	7
(France) Team Roscar	Porsche 997 GT3 Cup	391	(France) Yann Penlou	GTB	7
(Netherlands) Vuik Racing	Mercedes-Benz C63 AMG	333	(Netherlands) Henk Vuik	GTB	5
(United Kingdom) In2Racing	Porsche 991 GT3 Cup	335	(United Kingdom) Joe Tuckey	GTB	7
(United Kingdom) In2Racing	Porsche 991 GT3 Cup	335	(United Kingdom) Tom Wrigley	GTB	7
(Netherlands) Stichting Euro Autosport	BMW M3 (E92)	344	(Netherlands) Ruud Olij	GTB	5
(United Kingdom) Intersport Racing	Lamborghini Gallardo GT3	351	(United Kingdom) Adam Hayes	GTB	7
(United Kingdom) Intersport Racing	BMW M3 (E46)	438	(United Kingdom) Kevin Clarke	SS	6–7
(United Kingdom) Intersport Racing	BMW M3 (E46)	438	(United Kingdom) Anna Walewska	SS	6–7
(United Kingdom) Intersport Racing	BMW M3 (E92)	454	(United Kingdom) Dan Stringfellow	SS	3
(United Kingdom) Saxon Motorsport	BMW 150i V10 GTR	356	(United Kingdom) Nick Barrow	GTB	7
(United Kingdom) Saxon Motorsport	BMW 150i V10 GTR	356	(United Kingdom) Richard Corbett	GTB	7
(Netherlands) ABW Racing	Porsche 997 GT3 Cup	369	(Netherlands) Aart Bosman	GTB	All
(Belgium) VGL Racing	Saker RapX	412	(Netherlands) Danny Wagtmans	SS	3–4
(Belgium) VGL Racing	Saker RapX	412	(Netherlands) Maik Barten	SS	3
(Belgium) VGL Racing	Saker RapX	412	(Belgium) Luc Branckaerts	SS	4
(Belgium) Delahaye Racing Team	Porsche Cayman GT4 Clubsport	417	(France) Pierre-Etienne Bordet	SS	3
(Belgium) Delahaye Racing Team	Porsche Cayman GT4 Clubsport	417	(France) Alexandre Viron	SS	3
(Netherlands) / FEBO Racing Team (Note: Car No. 420 entered as FEBO Racing Team and car No. 422 entered as Ferry Monster Autosport.); (Netherlands) / Ferry Monster Autosport	SEAT León Cup Racer	420	(Netherlands) Dennis de Borst	SS	All
(Netherlands) / FEBO Racing Team; (Netherlands) / Ferry Monster Autosport	SEAT León Cup Racer	420	(Netherlands) Martin de Kleijn	SS	1–4, 6–8
(Netherlands) / FEBO Racing Team; (Netherlands) / Ferry Monster Autosport	SEAT León Cup Racer	420	(Netherlands) Pim van Riet	SS	5
(Netherlands) / FEBO Racing Team; (Netherlands) / Ferry Monster Autosport	SEAT León Cup Racer	422	(Netherlands) Dennis Houweling	SS	2–8
(Netherlands) / FEBO Racing Team; (Netherlands) / Ferry Monster Autosport	SEAT León Cup Racer	422	(Netherlands) Aart Jan Ringelberg	SS	2–8
(Belgium) Spork Racing Team	SEAT León Supercopa (Mk2)	423	(Belgium) Jimmy Adriaenssens	SS	4
(Belgium) Spork Racing Team	SEAT León Supercopa (Mk2)	423	(Belgium) Kris van Kelst	SS	4
(Netherlands) Meijers Motorsport	BMW M3 (E46)	428	(Netherlands) Frank Meijers	SS	1
(Netherlands) Meijers Motorsport	BMW M3 (E46)	428	(Netherlands) Menno Meijers	SS	1
(Germany) Bonk Motorsport	BMW M235i Racing	433	(Germany) Matthias Schrey	SS	8
(Germany) Bonk Motorsport	BMW M235i Racing	433	(Germany) Michael Schrey	SS	8
(Germany) Bonk Motorsport	BMW M235i Racing	522	(Germany) Michael Schrey	Sport	4
(Netherlands) AB Racing Team	BMW M3 (E36)	434	(United Kingdom) Ollie Taylor	SS	6
(Netherlands) Racing Team Oosten & Bijzitter	BMW Z4 Zilhouette	435	(Netherlands) Hielke Oosten	SS	3, 7
(Netherlands) Racing Team Oosten & Bijzitter	BMW Z4 Zilhouette	435	(Netherlands) Sipke Bijzitter	SS	3
(Netherlands) Racing Team Oosten & Bijzitter	BMW Z4 Zilhouette	435	(Netherlands) Erik Geerts	SS	7 (R2)
(Netherlands) Strandpark Kustlicht	BMW 132i (E87)	445	(Netherlands) Robert van den Berg	SS	All
(Netherlands) Strandpark Kustlicht	BMW 132i (E87)	445	(Netherlands) Huub Delnoij	SS	1–2
(Netherlands) Strandpark Kustlicht	BMW 132i (E87)	445	(Netherlands) Benjamin van den Berg	SS	3–8
(Netherlands) Strandpark Kustlicht	BMW 130i (E87)	545	(Netherlands) Benjamin van den Berg	Sport	1–2
(Netherlands) Strandpark Kustlicht	BMW 130i (E87)	545	(Netherlands) John van der Voort	Sport	1–2
(Netherlands) AT Motorsport	ATR3	451	(Netherlands) Wim Lemmers	SS	1
(Netherlands) AT Motorsport	ATR3	451	(Netherlands) Kim Troeijen	SS	1
(Netherlands) AT Motorsport	Ford Focus Silhouette	513	(Netherlands) Wim Lemmers	Sport	3–5, 7–8
(Netherlands) AT Motorsport	Ford Focus Silhouette	513	(Netherlands) Kim Troeijen	Sport	3–5, 7–8
(United Kingdom) PDS Racing	SEAT León Supercopa (Mk2)	452	(United Kingdom) Michael Smith	SS	6–7
(Netherlands) BS Racing Team	BMW M3 GTR (E46)	459	(Netherlands) Marcel van der Maat	SS	1–5, 7–8
(Netherlands) BS Racing Team	BMW M3 GTR (E46)	459	(Netherlands) Peter Scheurs	SS	1–5, 7–8
(Netherlands) Van der Kooi Racing	Lotus Exige 250 Cup	471	(Netherlands) Jan van der Kooi	SS	All
(Netherlands) Van der Kooi Racing	Lotus Exige 250 Cup	471	(Netherlands) Priscilla Speelman	SS	All
(Netherlands) Van der Kooi Racing	Lotus Exige	555	(Netherlands) Carlijn Bergsma	Sport	All
(Netherlands) Van der Kooi Racing	Lotus Exige	555	(Netherlands) Pieter de Jong	Sport	All
(United Kingdom) Krayem Racing	Ginetta G50 GT4	488	(United Kingdom) David Krayem	SS	3–4
(United Kingdom) Krayem Racing	Ginetta G50 GT4	488	(United Kingdom) Ben Scrivens	SS	3–4
(Netherlands) Spirit Racing	Renault Clio RS (III)	503	(Netherlands) Rob Nieman	Sport	All
(Netherlands) Spirit Racing	Renault Clio RS (III)	523	(Netherlands) Jos Veldboer	Sport	1–5, 7–8 (Note: Piet de Gier only drove in Race 1 of Round 3 at the Spa Euro Races and Jos Velboer only drove in Race 2.)
(Netherlands) Spirit Racing	Renault Clio RS (III)	523	(Netherlands) Piet de Gier	Sport	3–4
(Netherlands) Spirit Racing	Renault Clio RS (III)	523	(Netherlands) Marcel Dekker	Sport	5
(Netherlands) Spirit Racing	Renault Clio RS (III)	577	(Netherlands) Stan van Oord	Sport	All
(Netherlands) AB Racing Team	BMW M3 (E36)	507	(United Kingdom) Ollie Taylor	Sport	1
(Belgium) Vannerum Motorsport	BMW M235i Racing	516	(Belgium) Johan Vannerum	Sport	3–4
(Belgium) Vannerum Motorsport	BMW M235i Racing	516	(Belgium) Marc Vannerum	Sport	3–4
(Belgium) Vannerum Motorsport	BMW M235i Racing	516	(Belgium) Jean-Luc Behets	Sport	3
(Netherlands) Raceteam The Inside	BMW Z4 Zilhouette Sport	519	(Netherlands) Michael Hermans	Sport	3, 7
(Netherlands) Raceteam The Inside	BMW Z4 Zilhouette Sport	519	(Netherlands) Erik Geerts	Sport	7 (R1)
(Belgium) Traxx Racing Team	Peugeot RCZ	525	(Belgium) Bart van den Broeck	Sport	All
(Belgium) Traxx Racing Team	Peugeot RCZ	525	(Belgium) Chris Voet	Sport	All
(Netherlands) Bronckhorst Car Racing	BMW 130i (E87)	526	(Netherlands) Harold Wisselink	Sport	1–5, 7–8
(Netherlands) Bronckhorst Car Racing	BMW 130i (E87)	526	(Netherlands) Henk Tappel	Sport	1, 5, 8
(Netherlands) Bronckhorst Car Racing	BMW 130i (E87)	526	(Netherlands) Toon Rutgers	Sport	2–4, 7
(Netherlands) Wilbert van de Burg	Alfa Romeo 147 Cup	528	(Netherlands) Wilbert van de Burg	Sport	8
(Netherlands) Team Bleekemolen	Renault Clio (IV)	590	(Belgium) Stephan Polderman	Sport	7–8
(Netherlands) Team Bleekemolen	Renault Clio (IV)	590	(Netherlands) Michael Bleekemolen	Sport	7 (R2)
(Belgium) Deldiche Racing	Norma 20FC	701	(Belgium) Luc de Cock	SL1	All
(Belgium) Deldiche Racing	Norma 20FC	701	(Belgium) Tim Joosen	SL1	All
(Netherlands) Bas Koeten Racing	Wolf GB08	704	(Netherlands) Rob Kamphues	SL1	1, 5, 8
(Netherlands) Bas Koeten Racing	Wolf GB08	704	(Netherlands) Leon Rijnbeek	SL1	1, 5, 8
(Netherlands) Bas Koeten Racing	Wolf GB08	704	(Qatar) Amro Al-Hamad	SL1	4
(Belgium) McDonald's Racing Team/Norma Benelux	Norma 20FC	705	(Belgium) David Houthoofd	SL1	1, 4
(Belgium) McDonald's Racing Team/Norma Benelux	Norma 20FC	705	(Belgium) François Bouillon	SL1	4
(Germany) Teichmann Radical DE	Radical SR8	708	(Germany) Bernd Rosenschon	SL1	5
(Belgium) GHK Racing	Ligier JS51	783	(Netherlands) Patrick Engelen	SL2	1
(Belgium) GHK Racing	Ligier JS51	783	(Netherlands) Cristian Holtappels	SL2	1
(Germany) DD-Compound	Radical SR3 RS	786	(Germany) Dominik Dierkes	SL2	All
(Germany) DD-Compound	Radical SR3 RS	786	(Germany) Hauke Höschler	SL2	4, 8
(Belgium) B&T Racing	Radical SR3	790	(Belgium) Bart Ooms	SL2	1

Icon	Class
SGT	Super GT class
GTB	GTB class
SS	Supersport class
Sport	Sport class
SL1	Superlights 1 class
SL2	Superlights 2 class
SQD	Supercar Guest Division

== Race results ==
Round		Circuit	Super GT Winning Car	GTB Winning Car	Supersport Winning Car	Sport Winning Car	Superlights 1 Winning Car	Superlights 2 Winning Car
Round		Circuit	Super GT Winning Drivers	GTB Winning Drivers	Supersport Winning Drivers	Sport Winning Drivers	Superlights 1 Winning Drivers	Superlights 2 Winning Drivers
1	R1	(Belgium) Zolder	(Netherlands) No. 105 Day-V-Tec	(Netherlands) No. 317 Team RaceArt	(Netherlands) No. 402 Van de Pas Racing/ Munckhof Racing	(Netherlands) No. 509 Day-V-Tec	(Belgium) No. 701 Deldiche Racing	(Belgium) No. 790 B&T Racing
1	R1	(Belgium) Zolder	(Netherlands) Indy Dontje (Netherlands) Milan Dontje	(Netherlands) Roger Grouwels	(Netherlands) Eric van den Munckhof	(Netherlands) Bart Drost (Netherlands) Niels Kool	(Belgium) Luc de Cock (Belgium) Tim Joosen	(Belgium) Bart Ooms
1	R2	(Belgium) Zolder	(Netherlands) No. 103 Volvo Reede Racing by Day-V-Tec	(Netherlands) No. 317 Team RaceArt	(Netherlands) No. 420 FEBO Racing Team	(Belgium) No. 525 Traxx Racing Team	(Netherlands) No. 715 Day-V-Tec	(Belgium) No. 790 B&T Racing
1	R2	(Belgium) Zolder	(Netherlands) Henry Zumbrink	(Netherlands) Roger Grouwels	(Netherlands) Dennis de Borst (Netherlands) Martin de Kleijn	(Belgium) Bart van den Broeck (Belgium) Chris Voet	(Netherlands) Indy Dontje (Netherlands) Milan Dontje	(Belgium) Bart Ooms
2	R1	(Germany) Oschersleben	(Spain) No. 153 Escuela Española de Pilotos	(Netherlands) No. 311 JR Motorsport	(Netherlands) No. 444 BlueBerry Racing	(Netherlands) No. 526 Bronckhorst Car Racing	Did not participate	
2	R1	(Germany) Oschersleben	(Spain) Oliver Campos-Hull (Greece) Kosta Kanaroglou	(Belgium) Chris Mattheus (Belgium) Ward Sluys	(Netherlands) Luuk van Loon (Netherlands) Ronald van Loon	(Netherlands) Toon Rutgers (Netherlands) Harold Wisselink	Did not participate	
2	R2	(Germany) Oschersleben	(Spain) No. 154 Escuela Española de Pilotos	(Netherlands) No. 311 JR Motorsport	(Netherlands) No. 420 FEBO Racing Team	(Netherlands) No. 526 Bronckhorst Car Racing	Did not participate	
2	R2	(Germany) Oschersleben	(Spain) Alberto de Martín (Portugal) Pedro Salvador	(Belgium) Chris Mattheus (Belgium) Ward Sluys	(Netherlands) Dennis de Borst (Netherlands) Martin de Kleijn	(Netherlands) Toon Rutgers (Netherlands) Harold Wisselink	Did not participate	
3	R1	(Belgium) Spa-Francorchamps	(Spain) No. 190 Monlau Competición	(Netherlands) No. 325 SDW Shipping by JR Motorsport	(Netherlands) No. 416 JR Motorsport	(Belgium) No. 525 Traxx Racing Team	Did not participate	
3	R1	(Belgium) Spa-Francorchamps	(Spain) José Manuel Pérez-Aicart (Belgium) Jürgen Smet	(Netherlands) Mark van der Aa (Netherlands) Koen Bogaerts	(Netherlands) Bas Schouten (Netherlands) Joris Schouten	(Belgium) Bart van den Broeck (Belgium) Chris Voet	Did not participate	
3	R2	(Belgium) Spa-Francorchamps	(Netherlands) No. 105 Day-V-Tec	(Belgium) No. 307 DVB Racing	(Netherlands) No. 444 BlueBerry Racing	(Belgium) No. 516 Vannerum Motorsport	Did not participate	
3	R2	(Belgium) Spa-Francorchamps	(Netherlands) Milan Dontje (Netherlands) Jan Lammers	(Belgium) Manu Van de Ryse (Belgium) Nicolas Vandierendonck	(Netherlands) Luuk van Loon (Netherlands) Ronald van Loon	(Belgium) Jean-Luc Behets (Belgium) Johan Vannerum (Belgium) Marc Vannerum	Did not participate	
4	R1	(Belgium) Zolder	(Spain) No. 153 Escuela Española de Pilotos	(Netherlands) No. 311 JR Motorsport	(Netherlands) No. 459 BS Racing Team	(Germany) No. 522 Bonk Motorsport	(Belgium) No. 701 Deldiche Racing	(Germany) No. 786 DD-Compound
4	R1	(Belgium) Zolder	(Spain) Oliver Campos-Hull (Greece) Kosta Kanaroglou	(Belgium) Chris Mattheus (Belgium) Ward Sluys	(Netherlands) Marcel van der Maat (Netherlands) Peter Scheurs	(Germany) Michael Schrey	(Belgium) Luc de Cock (Belgium) Tim Joosen	(Germany) Dominik Dierkes (Germany) Hauke Höschler
4	R2	(Belgium) Zolder	(Spain) No. 190 Monlau Competición	(Netherlands) No. 317 Team RaceArt	(Netherlands) No. 445 Strandpark Kustlicht	(Netherlands) No. 509 Day-V-Tec	(Belgium) No. 701 Deldiche Racing	(Germany) No. 786 DD-Compound
4	R2	(Belgium) Zolder	(Spain) José Manuel Pérez-Aicart (Belgium) Jürgen Smet	(Netherlands) Roger Grouwels	(Netherlands) Benjamin van den Berg (Netherlands) Robert van den Berg	(Netherlands) Niels Kool	(Belgium) Luc de Cock (Belgium) Tim Joosen	(Germany) Dominik Dierkes (Germany) Hauke Höschler
5	R1	(Netherlands) Assen	(Netherlands) No. 171 Pumaxs Racing	(Netherlands) No. 311 JR Motorsport	(Netherlands) No. 471 Van der Kooi Racing	(Netherlands) No. 577 Spirit Racing	(Netherlands) No. 705 Day-V-Tec	(Germany) No. 786 DD-Compound
5	R1	(Netherlands) Assen	(Netherlands) Henk Thuis	(Belgium) Chris Mattheus (Belgium) Ward Sluys	(Netherlands) Jan van der Kooi (Netherlands) Priscilla Speelman	(Netherlands) Stan van Oord	(Netherlands) Frits van Eerd (Netherlands) Jan Lammers	(Germany) Dominik Dierkes
5	R2	(Netherlands) Assen	(Netherlands) No. 171 Pumaxs Racing	(Netherlands) No. 311 JR Motorsport	(Netherlands) No. 422 Ferry Monster Autosport	(Netherlands) No. 555 Van der Kooi Racing	(Netherlands) No. 706 Day-V-Tec	(Germany) No. 786 DD-Compound
5	R2	(Netherlands) Assen	(Netherlands) Henk Thuis	(Belgium) Chris Mattheus (Belgium) Ward Sluys	(Netherlands) Dennis Houweling	(Netherlands) Carlijn Bergsma (Netherlands) Pieter de Jong	(Netherlands) Milan Dontje (Netherlands) Nigel Melker	(Germany) Dominik Dierkes
6	R1	(United Kingdom) Snetterton	(Spain) No. 153 Escuela Española de Pilotos	(Belgium) No. 326 JJ Racing	(Netherlands) No. 422 Ferry Monster Autosport	(Netherlands) No. 509 Day-V-Tec	Did not participate	
6	R1	(United Kingdom) Snetterton	(Spain) Oliver Campos-Hull (Greece) Kosta Kanaroglou	(Belgium) Jos Jansen	(Netherlands) Dennis Houweling (Netherlands) Aart Jan Ringelberg	(Netherlands) Niels Kool	Did not participate	
6	R2	(United Kingdom) Snetterton	(United Kingdom) No. 127 RAW Motorsports	(Netherlands) No. 311 JR Motorsport	(Netherlands) No. 420 FEBO Racing Team	(Netherlands) No. 555 Van der Kooi Racing	Did not participate	
6	R2	(United Kingdom) Snetterton	(United Kingdom) Tom Ashton (United Kingdom) Rob Wheldon	(Belgium) Ward Sluys (Netherlands) Michael Verhagen	(Netherlands) Dennis de Borst (Netherlands) Martin de Kleijn	(Netherlands) Carlijn Bergsma (Netherlands) Pieter de Jong	Did not participate	
7	R1	(Belgium) Spa-Francorchamps	(Netherlands) No. 171 Pumaxs Racing	(France) No. 391 Team Roscar	(Netherlands) No. 459 BS Racing Team	(Belgium) No. 525 Traxx Racing Team	Did not participate	
7	R1	(Belgium) Spa-Francorchamps	(Netherlands) Henk Thuis	(France) Yann Penlou	(Netherlands) Marcel van der Maat (Netherlands) Peter Scheurs	(Belgium) Bart van den Broeck (Belgium) Chris Voet	Did not participate	
7	R2	(Belgium) Spa-Francorchamps	(Spain) No. 153 Escuela Española de Pilotos	(France) No. 391 Team Roscar	(Netherlands) No. 445 Strandpark Kustlicht	(Netherlands) No. 526 Bronckhorst Car Racing	Did not participate	
7	R2	(Belgium) Spa-Francorchamps	(Spain) Oliver Campos-Hull (Greece) Kosta Kanaroglou	(France) Yann Penlou	(Netherlands) Benjamin van den Berg (Netherlands) Robert van den Berg	(Netherlands) Toon Rutgers (Netherlands) Harold Wisselink	Did not participate	
8	R1	(Netherlands) Assen	(Netherlands) No. 171 Pumaxs Racing	(Netherlands) No. 311 JR Motorsport	(Netherlands) No. 420 FEBO Racing Team	(Netherlands) No. 509 Day-V-Tec	(Netherlands) No. 707 Day-V-Tec	(Germany) No. 786 DD-Compound
8	R1	(Netherlands) Assen	(Netherlands) Henk Thuis	(Belgium) Chris Mattheus (Belgium) Ward Sluys	(Netherlands) Dennis de Borst (Netherlands) Martin de Kleijn	(Netherlands) Bart Drost (Netherlands) Niels Kool	(Netherlands) Nigel Melker	(Germany) Dominik Dierkes (Germany) Hauke Höschler
8	R2	(Netherlands) Assen	(Netherlands) No. 103 Volvo Reede Racing by Day-V-Tec	(Netherlands) No. 365 JR Motorsport	(Netherlands) No. 422 Ferry Monster Autosport	(Netherlands) No. 528 Wilbert van de Burg	(Netherlands) No. 707 Day-V-Tec	(Netherlands) No. 770 BlueBerry Racing
8	R2	(Netherlands) Assen	(Netherlands) Henry Zumbrink	(Netherlands) Michael Verhagen	(Netherlands) Dennis Houweling (Netherlands) Aart Jan Ringelberg	(Netherlands) Wilbert van de Burg	(Netherlands) Nigel Melker	(Netherlands) Paul Sieljes

== Championship standings ==
Scoring system

Championship points were awarded based on finishing positions as shown in the chart below. The pole-sitter in Race 1 and Race 2 and the driver with the fastest lap in Race 1 and Race 2 also received one point. The grid for Race 1 was decided by a normal qualifying, but the grid for Race 2 was decided by everyone's second best time in qualifying. If a guest driver got Pole Position, the point would go to the best qualified regular driver. If a guest driver had the fastest lap, the point would go to the regular driver with the fastest lap. Entries were required to complete 75% of the winning car's (per division) race distance in order to be classified and earn points. All results counted towards the year-end standings. There were no scratch results. If there were in a division on average less than five participants the overall points standing would be reduced with 75%.

Position	**1st**	**2nd**	**3rd**	**4th**	**5th**	**6th**	**7th**	**8th**	**9th**	**10th**	**Pole**	**FL**
Points	20	18	16	14	12	10	8	6	4	2	1	1

=== Drivers' championships ===
==== Super GT/GTB ====
Pos.	Driver	Team	ZOL (Belgium)		OSC (Germany)		SPA (Belgium)		ZOL (Belgium)		ASS (Netherlands)		SNE (United Kingdom)		SPA (Belgium)		ASS (Netherlands)		Points
Super GT
1	(Spain) Oliver Campos-Hull	(Spain) Escuela Española de Pilotos	3	3	**1**	**2**	10	Ret	3	3			1	3	**4**	**2**	Ret	14	213
1	(Greece) Kosta Kanaroglou	(Spain) Escuela Española de Pilotos	3	3	**1**	**2**	10	Ret	3	3			1	3	**4**	**2**	Ret	14	213
2	(Netherlands) Henry Zumbrink	(Netherlands) Volvo Reede Racing by Day-V-Tec	2	1	2	11	Ret	6	DNS	WD	**6**	2			3	Ret	9	4	171
3	(Netherlands) Henk Thuis	(Netherlands) Pumaxs Racing	7	Ret	4	Ret	3	3			2	**1**			2	Ret	4	Ret	142
4	(Spain) Alberto de Martín	(Spain) Escuela Española de Pilotos	4	5	3	1	11	4	Ret	5	9	23							125
4	(United Kingdom) Ben Clucas	(Spain) Escuela Española de Pilotos	4	5			11	4											125
4	(Portugal) Pedro Salvador	(Spain) Escuela Española de Pilotos			3	1			Ret	5	9	23							125
5	(Luxembourg) Jean-Pierre Lequeux	(Luxembourg) Prime Racing	Ret	2			16	5	7	4	11	9			5	3			124
6	(Spain) José Manuel Pérez-Aicart	(Spain) Monlau Competición					**1**	**2**	**5**	**2**									83
6	(Belgium) Jürgen Smet	(Spain) Monlau Competición					**1**	**2**	**5**	**2**									83
7	(Netherlands) Berry van Elk	(Netherlands) BlueBerry Racing	Ret	DNS	7	Ret	Ret	Ret	11	12	20	DNS	11	DNS	Ret	29			78
8	(Netherlands) Milan Dontje	(Netherlands) Day-V-Tec	**1**	**Ret**			2	1											63
9	(Netherlands) Bob Herber	(Netherlands) Rapide Racing	8	4							5	7							56
10	(United Kingdom) Rob Wheldon	(United Kingdom) RAW Motorsports											Ret	1			**5**	**Ret**	43
10	(United Kingdom) Tom Ashton	(United Kingdom) RAW Motorsports											Ret	1					43
10	(United Kingdom) Steve Burgess	(United Kingdom) RAW Motorsports															**5**	**Ret**	43
11	(United Kingdom) Tim Gray	(United Kingdom) VR Motorsport											**2**	**2**					38
11	(United Kingdom) Oliver Hewitt	(United Kingdom) VR Motorsport											**2**	**2**					38
12	(Netherlands) Cor Euser	(Netherlands) Cor Euser Racing															15	11	32
12	(United Kingdom) Trevor Knight	(Netherlands) Cor Euser Racing															15	11	32
13	(Netherlands) Martin Lanting	(Italy) Martino Rosso Racing									8	6							30
14	(Netherlands) Indy Dontje	(Netherlands) Day-V-Tec	**1**	**Ret**															24
15	(Poland) Andrzej Lewandowski	GT3 Poland					4	12											22
15	(Poland) Teodor Myszkowski	GT3 Poland					4	12											22
16	(Netherlands) Jan Lammers	(Netherlands) Day-V-Tec						1											21
17	(Netherlands) Frits van Eerd	(Netherlands) Day-V-Tec					2												18
Guest drivers ineligible for Super GT points
	(Belgium) Sam Dejonghe	(Luxembourg) Prime Racing	Ret	2															
	(Luxembourg) Jean-Marc Ueberecken	(Luxembourg) Prime Racing													5	3			
Supercar Guest Division drivers ineligible for points
	(Netherlands) Max Koebolt	(Netherlands) Day-V-Tec													**1**	**1**			
	(Netherlands) Nigel Melker	(Netherlands) Day-V-Tec													**1**	**1**			
GTB
1	(Belgium) Ward Sluys	(Netherlands) JR Motorsport	**6**	23	**5**	**3**	DNS	WD	**6**	**8**	**10**	**10**	**13**	**4**	**7**	5	**10**	**7**	293
1	(Belgium) Chris Mattheus	(Netherlands) JR Motorsport	**6**	23	**5**	**3**	29	22	**6**	**8**	**10**	**10**			**7**	5	**10**	**7**	293
2	(Netherlands) Aart Bosman	(Netherlands) ABW Racing	15	10	12	9	17	19	12	14	15	16	20	5	11	8	13	12	212
3	(Belgium) Jos Jansen	(Belgium) JJ Racing	13	7	8	4	27	Ret	Ret	10	23	17	6	10	12	DNS	Ret	10	154
4	(Netherlands) Roger Grouwels	(Netherlands) Team RaceArt	5	**6**					8	6	Ret	11							97
5	(Netherlands) Marcel van Berlo	(Netherlands) Van Berlo Racing					18	9			14	13			9	6			90
6	(Netherlands) Koen Bogaerts	(Netherlands) SDW Shipping by JR Motorsport					**13**	**8**	13	7	Ret	12							86
6	(Netherlands) Mark van der Aa	(Netherlands) SDW Shipping by JR Motorsport					**13**	**8**			Ret	12							86
6	(Netherlands) Pieter van Soelen	(Netherlands) SDW Shipping by JR Motorsport							13	7									86
7	(Netherlands) Hans Fabri	(Netherlands) Team RaceArt	12	11					9	9	19	19							74
8	(Turkey) Cenk Ceyisakar	(Belgium) DVB Racing									12	14					12	Ret	46
9	(United Kingdom) Fiona James	(Netherlands) BlueBerry Racing			18	8							Ret	14					42
10	(France) Yann Penlou	(France) Team Roscar													6	4			41
11	(Belgium) Manu Van de Ryse	(Belgium) DVB Racing					15	7											39
11	(Belgium) Nicolas Vandierendonck	(Belgium) DVB Racing					15	7											39
12	(Germany) Oliver Freymuth	(Germany) AKF Motorsport			6	Ret	25	11											38
13	(Netherlands) Thijs Heezen	(Netherlands) Power Race Products															14	9	28
13	(Netherlands) Jos Menten	(Netherlands) Power Race Products															14	9	28
14	(France) Denis Allemang	(Netherlands) Cor Euser Racing					19	10											27
14	(Netherlands) Cor Euser	(Netherlands) Cor Euser Racing					19	10											27
15	(Netherlands) Bob Herber	(Netherlands) JR Motorsport													8	**10**			25
15	(Netherlands) Daan Meijer	(Netherlands) JR Motorsport													8	**10**			25
16	(Switzerland) Thomas Winkler	(France) Team Roscar													10	9			22
17	(Netherlands) Michael Verhagen	(Netherlands) JR Motorsport											**13**^{1}	**4**^{1}				6	20
18	(Netherlands) Bas Schouten	(Netherlands) JR Motorsport															11		19
19	(Netherlands) Henk Vuik	(Netherlands) Vuik Racing									16	18							18
20	(Netherlands) Dirk Schulz	(Netherlands) Topper Team					23	Ret			21	22			38	22			18
21	(Netherlands) Jan-Marc Schulz	(Netherlands) Topper Team					23	Ret			22	20							18
22	(United Kingdom) Joe Tuckey	(United Kingdom) In2Racing													21	7			15
22	(United Kingdom) Tom Wrigley	(United Kingdom) In2Racing													21	7			15
23	(Turkey) Yadel Oskan	(Belgium) DVB Racing															Ret	13	10
24	(United Kingdom) Adam Hayes	(United Kingdom) Intersport Racing													18	14			10
25	(United Kingdom) Nick Barrow	(United Kingdom) Saxon Motorsport													20	11			8
25	(United Kingdom) Richard Corbett	(United Kingdom) Saxon Motorsport													20	11			8
26	(France) Serge Incorvaia	(France) Team Roscar													19	16			6
26	(France) Olivier Montgermont	(France) Team Roscar													19	16			6
	(France) Pascal Burgart	(France) Team Roscar													26	17			0
	(France) David Sarny	(France) Team Roscar													26	17			0
	(Netherlands) Sebastiaan Bleekemolen	(Netherlands) Topper Team													38	22			0
	(Switzerland) Tomas Pfister	(France) Team Roscar													27	23			0
	(Switzerland) Alfred Winkler	(France) Team Roscar													27	23			0
	(Netherlands) Ruud Olij	(Netherlands) Stichting Euro Autosport									Ret	Ret							0
	(Turkey) Cengiz Oguzhan	(Belgium) DVB Racing									Ret	Ret							0
Pos.	Driver	Team	ZOL (Belgium)		OSC (Germany)		SPA (Belgium)		ZOL (Belgium)		ASS (Netherlands)		SNE (United Kingdom)		SPA (Belgium)		ASS (Netherlands)		Points

Key
Colour	Result
Gold	Race winner
Silver	2nd place
Bronze	3rd place
Green	Points finish
Blue	Non-points finish
Blue	Non-classified finish (NC)
Purple	Did not finish (Ret)
Black	Disqualified (DSQ)
Black	Excluded (EX)
White	Did not start (DNS)
White	Race cancelled (C)
White	Withdrew (WD)
Blank	Did not participate

**Bold** – Pole position
Italics – Fastest lap

Notes

- ^{1} – Michael Verhagen was a guest driver during the Dutch on Tour and was ineligible to score points.

==== Supersport/Sport ====
Pos.	Driver	Team	ZOL (Belgium)		OSC (Germany)		SPA (Belgium)		ZOL (Belgium)		ASS (Netherlands)		SNE (United Kingdom)		SPA (Belgium)		ASS (Netherlands)		Points
Supersport
1	(Netherlands) Dennis de Borst	(Netherlands) FEBO Racing Team	10	8	Ret	5	9	14	2	5	Ret	2	10	6	15	21	**1**	**3**	227
1	(Netherlands) Martin de Kleijn	(Netherlands) FEBO Racing Team	10	8	Ret	5	9	14	2	5			10	6	15	21	**1**	**3**	227
2	(Netherlands) Luuk van Loon	(Netherlands) BlueBerry Racing	11	15	9	**10**	6	13	Ret	8	4	3	7	11	14	18	4	5	222
2	(Netherlands) Ronald van Loon	(Netherlands) BlueBerry Racing	11	15	9	**10**	6	13	Ret	8	4	3	7	11	14	18	4	5	222
3	(Netherlands) Dennis Houweling	(Netherlands) Ferry Monster Autosport			10	7	7	16	3	6	2	1	3	**13**	22	19	2	1	220
3	(Netherlands) Aart Jan Ringelberg	(Netherlands) Ferry Monster Autosport			10	7	7	16	3	6	DNS	WD	3	**13**	22	19	2	1	220
4	(Netherlands) Robert van den Berg	(Netherlands) Strandpark Kustlicht	14	13	22	6	Ret	15	4	1	DNS	WD	**4**	7	**Ret**	12	7	Ret	177
5	(Netherlands) Jan van der Kooi	(Netherlands) Van der Kooi Racing	Ret	9	Ret	12	22	Ret	**Ret**	**3**	**1**	**Ret**	Ret	Ret	16	**13**	Ret	2	129
5	(Netherlands) Priscilla Speelman	(Netherlands) Van der Kooi Racing	Ret	9	Ret	12	22	Ret	**Ret**	**3**	**1**	**Ret**	Ret	Ret	16	**13**	Ret	2	129
6	(Netherlands) Marcel van der Maat	(Netherlands) BS Racing Team	**Ret**	DNS	21	DNS	**24**	**Ret**	1	4	3	Ret			13	20	3	12	128
6	(Netherlands) Peter Scheurs	(Netherlands) BS Racing Team	**Ret**	DNS	21	DNS	**24**	**Ret**	1	4	3	Ret			13	20	3	12	128
7	(Netherlands) Eric van den Munckhof	(Netherlands) Van de Pas Racing/Munckhof Racing	9	**12**	**11**	18	Ret	WD	Ret	2	Ret	WD	9	Ret	**17**	Ret			128
7	(Netherlands) Eric van den Munckhof	(Netherlands) JR Motorsport						18				4							128
8	(Netherlands) Benjamin van den Berg	(Netherlands) Strandpark Kustlicht					Ret	15	4	DNS	DNS	WD	**4**	7	**Ret**	12	7	Ret	99
9	(Netherlands) Ted van Vliet	(Netherlands) JR Motorsport	16	14			33	25	7	Ret			19	8	23	35	5	Ret	82
10	(Netherlands) Huub Delnoij	(Netherlands) Strandpark Kustlicht	14	13	22	6													58
11	(United Kingdom) Kevin Clarke	(United Kingdom) Intersport Racing											12	9	37	15			38
11	(United Kingdom) Anna Walewska	(United Kingdom) Intersport Racing											12	9	DNS	WD			38
12	(Netherlands) Danny Wagtmans	(Belgium) VGL Racing					8	17	Ret	18									31
12	(Netherlands) Maik Barten	(Belgium) VGL Racing					8	17											31
12	(Belgium) Luc Branckaerts	(Belgium) VGL Racing							Ret	18									31
13	(Netherlands) Joris Schouten	(Netherlands) JR Motorsport					5	18											30
14	(United Kingdom) Ollie Taylor	(Netherlands) AB Racing Team											5	12					27
15	(Netherlands) Bas Schouten	(Netherlands) JR Motorsport					5	25											24
16	(Spain) Manuel Cintrano	(Spain) Escuela Española de Pilotos															6	4	24
16	(Spain) Javier Morcillo	(Spain) Escuela Española de Pilotos															6	4	24
17	(Netherlands) Pim van Riet	(Netherlands) FEBO Racing Team									Ret	2							18
18	(United Kingdom) Michael Smith	(United Kingdom) PDS Racing											8	Ret	24	Ret			18
19	(France) Pierre-Etienne Bordet	(Belgium) Delahaye Racing Team					12	20											18
19	(France) Alexandre Viron	(Belgium) Delahaye Racing Team					12	20											18
20	(United Kingdom) David Krayem	(United Kingdom) Krayem Racing					14	29	10	Ret									18
20	(United Kingdom) Ben Scrivens	(United Kingdom) Krayem Racing					14	29	10	Ret									18
21	(Netherlands) Daan Meijer	(Netherlands) JR Motorsport									Ret	4							14
22	(Belgium) Jimmy Adriaenssens	(Belgium) Spork Racing Team							16	7									14
22	(Belgium) Kris van Kelst	(Belgium) Spork Racing Team							16	7									14
23	(Germany) Matthias Schrey	(Germany) Bonk Motorsport															11	16	14
23	(Germany) Michael Schrey	(Germany) Bonk Motorsport															11	16	14
24	(Netherlands) Bob Herber	(Netherlands) JR Motorsport							5	Ret									13
24	(Netherlands) Martin Lanting	(Netherlands) JR Motorsport							5	Ret									13
25	(Netherlands) Hielke Oosten	(Netherlands) Racing Team Oosten & Bijzitter					30^{1}	30^{1}							25	24			10
26	(United Kingdom) Dan Stringfellow	(United Kingdom) Intersport Racing					32	23											6
	(Netherlands) Frank Meijers	(Netherlands) Meijers Motorsport	Ret	DNS															0
	(Netherlands) Menno Meijers	(Netherlands) Meijers Motorsport	Ret	DNS															0
	(Netherlands) Wim Lemmers	(Netherlands) AT Motorsport	DNS	WD															0
	(Netherlands) Kim Troeijen	(Netherlands) AT Motorsport	DNS	WD															0
Guest drivers ineligible for Supersport points
	(Netherlands) Erik Geerts	(Netherlands) Racing Team Oosten & Bijzitter														24			
	(Netherlands) Sipke Bijzitter	(Netherlands) Racing Team Oosten & Bijzitter					30	30											
Sport
1	(Netherlands) Niels Kool	(Netherlands) Day-V-Tec	17	**22**	15	14	**35**	**27**	**8**	**9**	7	4	14	19	**29**	**28**	**8**	**13**	262
1	(Netherlands) Bart Drost	(Netherlands) Day-V-Tec	17	**22**	15	14	**35**	**27**			7	4	DNS	WD	**29**	**28**	**8**	**13**	262
2	(Belgium) Bart van den Broeck	(Belgium) Traxx Racing Team	18	16	16	15	20	24	13	13	11	7	16	17	28	26	16	11	240
2	(Belgium) Chris Voet	(Belgium) Traxx Racing Team	18	16	16	15	20	24	13	13	11	7	16	17	28	26	16	11	240
3	(Netherlands) Stan van Oord	(Netherlands) Spirit Racing	Ret	17	20	19	26	28	12	12	5	10	15	16	32	30	9	7	218
4	(Netherlands) Harold Wisselink	(Netherlands) Bronckhorst Car Racing	21	21	13	13	28	Ret	14	11	6	6			30	25	10	10	202
4	(Netherlands) Henk Tappel	(Netherlands) Bronckhorst Car Racing	21	21							6	6					10	10	202
4	(Netherlands) Toon Rutgers	(Netherlands) Bronckhorst Car Racing			13	13	28	Ret	14	11					30	25			202
5	(Netherlands) Carlijn Bergsma	(Netherlands) Van der Kooi Racing	23	20	**23**	**Ret**	31	26	9	10	**9**	**5**	**18**	**15**	34	Ret	15	9	190
5	(Netherlands) Pieter de Jong	(Netherlands) Van der Kooi Racing	23	20	**23**	**Ret**	31	26	9	10	**9**	**5**	**18**	**15**	34	Ret	15	9	190
6	(Netherlands) Rob Nieman	(Netherlands) Spirit Racing	20	18	17	20	34	31	15	15	8	Ret	17	18	33	31	13	14	166
7	(Netherlands) Jos Veldboer	(Netherlands) Spirit Racing	22	19	19	17		32	Ret	17	10	9			39	33	14	15	102
8	(Belgium) Johan Vannerum	(Belgium) Vannerum Motorsport					21	21	11	14									63
8	(Belgium) Marc Vannerum	(Belgium) Vannerum Motorsport					21	21	11	14									63
8	(Belgium) Jean-Luc Behets	(Belgium) Vannerum Motorsport					21	21											63
9	(Belgium) Stephan Polderman	(Netherlands) Team Bleekemolen													35	27	12	8	52
10	(Netherlands) Benjamin van den Berg	(Netherlands) Strandpark Kustlicht	**19**	Ret	14	16													50
10	(Netherlands) John van der Voort	(Netherlands) Strandpark Kustlicht	**19**	Ret	14	16													50
11	(Netherlands) Wim Lemmers	(Netherlands) AT Motorsport					DNS	WD	17	19	Ret	11			31	34	17	17	40
11	(Netherlands) Kim Troeijen	(Netherlands) AT Motorsport					DNS	WD	17	19	Ret	11			31	34	17	17	40
12	(Germany) Michael Schrey	(Germany) Bonk Motorsport							6	16									28
13	(Netherlands) Michael Hermans	(Netherlands) Raceteam The Inside					36	33							36	32			24
14	(Netherlands) Marcel Dekker	(Netherlands) Spirit Racing									10	9							22
15	(Netherlands) Wilbert van de Burg	(Netherlands) Wilbert van de Burg															DNS	6	20
16	(Netherlands) Piet de Gier	(Netherlands) Spirit Racing					37		Ret	DNS									4
	(United Kingdom) Ollie Taylor	(Netherlands) AB Racing Team	Ret	Ret															0
Guest drivers ineligible for Sport points
	(Netherlands) Michael Bleekemolen	(Netherlands) Team Bleekemolen														27			
	(Netherlands) Erik Geerts	(Netherlands) Raceteam The Inside													36				
Pos.	Driver	Team	ZOL (Belgium)		OSC (Germany)		SPA (Belgium)		ZOL (Belgium)		ASS (Netherlands)		SNE (United Kingdom)		SPA (Belgium)		ASS (Netherlands)		Points

Notes

- ^{1} – Hielke Oosten was a guest driver during the Spa Euro Races and was ineligible to score points.

==== Superlights 1/Superlights 2 ====
Pos.	Driver	Team	ZOL (Belgium)		ZOL (Belgium)		ASS (Netherlands)		ASS (Netherlands)		Points
Superlights 1
1	(Belgium) Luc de Cock	(Belgium) Deldiche Racing	**1**	**2**	**1**	**1**	**4**	**Ret**	3	15	132
1	(Belgium) Tim Joosen	(Belgium) Deldiche Racing	**1**	**2**	**1**	**1**	**4**	**Ret**	3	15	132
2	(Netherlands) Rob Kamphues	(Netherlands) Bas Koeten Racing	2	8			7	5	6	3	92
2	(Netherlands) Leon Rijnbeek	(Netherlands) Bas Koeten Racing	2	8			7	5	6	3	92
3	(Netherlands) Nigel Melker	(Netherlands) Day-V-Tec					3	3	**1**	**1**	84
4	(Netherlands) Frits van Eerd	(Netherlands) Day-V-Tec					1	4	7	2	68
4	(Netherlands) Jan Lammers	(Netherlands) Day-V-Tec					1	4	7	2	68
5	(Belgium) David Houthoofd	(Belgium) McDonald's Racing Team/Norma Benelux	3	3	2	13					66
5	(Belgium) François Bouillon	(Belgium) McDonald's Racing Team/Norma Benelux			2	13					66
6	(Netherlands) Milan Dontje	(Netherlands) Day-V-Tec	DNS	1			3	3			61
7	(Qatar) Amro Al-Hamad	(Netherlands) Bas Koeten Racing			4	11					34
8	(Germany) Bernd Rosenschon	(Germany) Teichmann Radical DE					17	8			26
9	(Netherlands) Indy Dontje	(Netherlands) Day-V-Tec	DNS	1							21
10	(Germany) Siggi Pfeiffer	(Netherlands) Power Race Products							2	Ret	18
Guest drivers ineligible for Superlights 1 points
	(Belgium) Sam Dejonghe	(Luxembourg) Prime Racing	DNS	4							
	(Luxembourg) Jean-Pierre Lequeux	(Luxembourg) Prime Racing	DNS	4							
Superlights 2
1	(Germany) Dominik Dierkes	(Germany) DD-Compound	DNS	7	**10**	**15**	**13**	**15**	8	8	142
2	(United Kingdom) Fiona James	(Netherlands) BlueBerry Racing	5	9	Ret	DNS	18	21			68
3	(Netherlands) Paul Sieljes	(Netherlands) BlueBerry Racing	Ret	DNS					**16**	**5**	42
4	(Belgium) Bart Ooms	(Belgium) B&T Racing	4	5							40
5	(Netherlands) Patrick Engelen	(Belgium) GHK Racing	**Ret**	**6**							22
5	(Netherlands) Cristian Holtappels	(Belgium) GHK Racing	**Ret**	**6**							22
	(Netherlands) Danny van Dongen	(Netherlands) BlueBerry Racing			Ret	Ret					0
	(Netherlands) Cor Euser	(Netherlands) BlueBerry Racing					Ret	DNS			0
Guest drivers ineligible for Superlights 2 points
	(Germany) Hauke Höschler	(Germany) DD-Compound			**10**	**15**			8	8	
Pos.	Driver	Team	ZOL (Belgium)		ZOL (Belgium)		ASS (Netherlands)		ASS (Netherlands)		Points

== See also ==
- Supercar Challenge (series)
