= Intergamma =

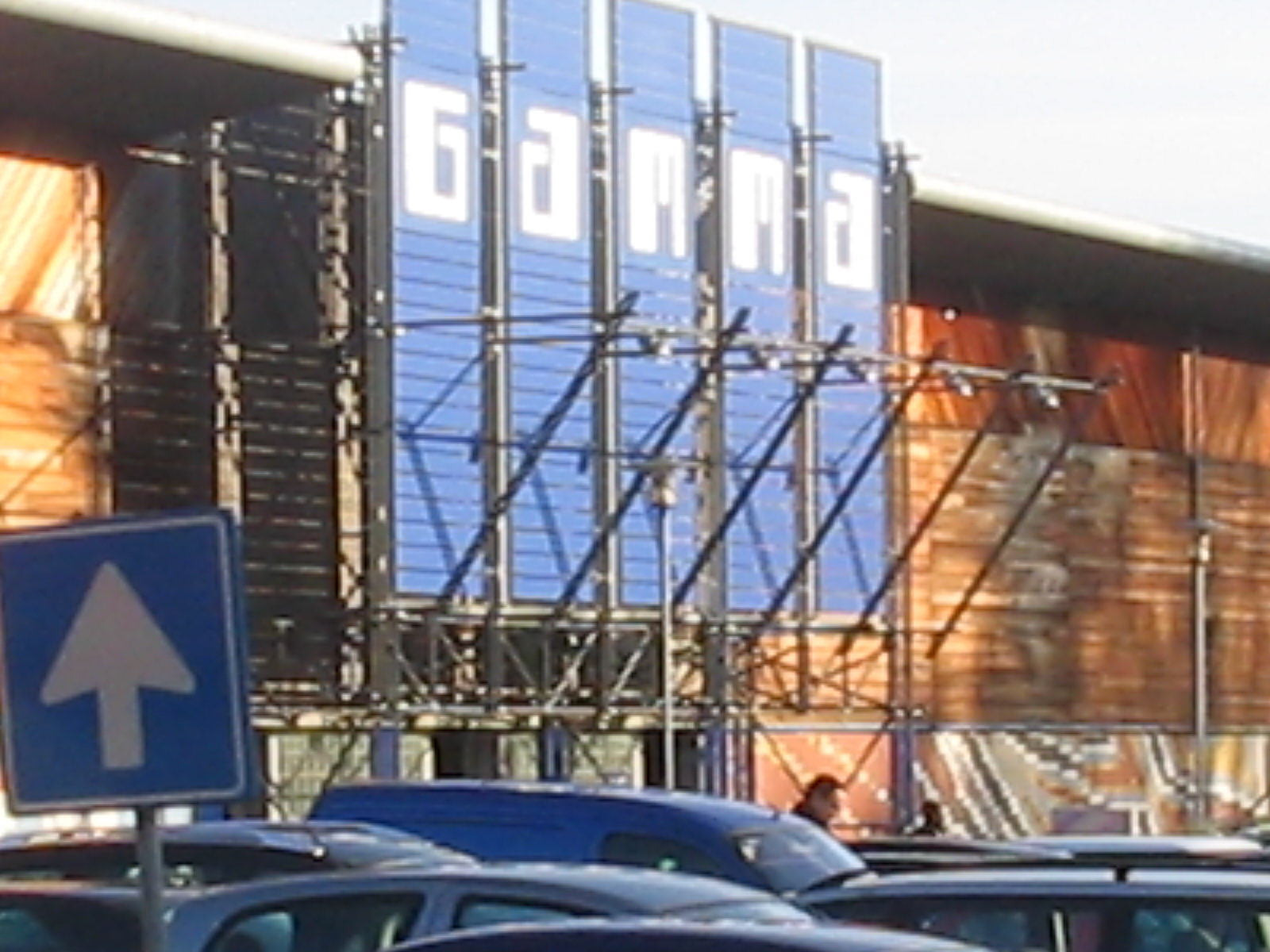
Gamma shop in Delft

Intergamma is a Dutch franchise-organisation. It owns two hardware store-chains, namely Gamma and Karwei. Intergamma started on May 11, 1971 with a Gamma store in Breda. Its current CEO is Harm-Jan Stoter.

As of 2011, Intergamma had 373 stores – 245 Gamma stores, of which 164 are located in the Netherlands, 81 in Belgium, and 128 Karwei stores, all of which are located in the Netherlands.

In 2008 Intergamma had a revenue of 998 million euro. Gamma had a revenue of 606 million euro and Karwei 392 million.

Intergamma has about 370 personnel and have locations in Leusden (headquarters) and Antwerp.
