= Olean Lumber =

Olean Lumber & Supply Corp.
- Company type: Privately owned
- Industry: Retail (Home Improvement)
- Founded: August 17, 1928 (Olean, New York)
- Headquarters: Olean, New York
- Key people: Jeffrey McMullen, President
- Products: Home improvement products such as home appliances, tools, household hardware, lumber and garden supplies & plants.
- Revenue: ▼$4 million USD (2003)
- Number of employees: 20

The Olean Lumber and Supply Corporation, successor of Olean Lumber Co, Inc., was established August 17, 1928 and is Olean, New York's oldest lumber retailer.

== History ==
The business occupies the former site of the Chamberlain Mfg. Company of the late-19th century; the Fobes Lumber Company and the Troy Lumber Co. After the Troy Lumber Company ceased business, businessmen W.H. McKay and A.B. McKane purchased the site and created the original Olean Lumber Company in 1921. However, some sources, such as the "History of the Counties..." book by J.H. Beers, point to the Olean Lumber Company being founded in 1854, in stark contrast to a 1935 article in the Olean Times Herald chronicling the fact that McKay and McKane created the company in 1921.

In 1921, Alexander J. McMullen came to Olean from Pennsylvania and accepted the position as office manager of the company. When McMullen purchased the company from McKay and McKane in 1928, it was renamed "The Olean Lumber and Supply Corporation." He became president and general manager. Howard Mitchell was named vice president, secretary and shop foreman, according to an Olean Times Herald article dated 8/17/1935.

Upon A.J. McMullen's passing in 1963, his son, Richard McMullen became company president. It was at this time that he would introduce the Cash and Carry concept.

Richard McMullen, company executive 1947-1978

Richard McMullen died on July 26, 1978, from a stroke caused by arteriosclerosis. This left George E. Baker as president. McMullen's son, Jeffrey McMullen, was named vice president. George F. Mayer was secretary and Roy S. Crandall was Treasurer. The company opened Green Street Custom Kitchen and Bath Center in 1985, according to the NYS Department of State.

In 1988 Jeffrey McMullen was named president.

According to the New York Department of State, the company was purchased by Kelly Chaffee in March 2005 and is undergoing renewal.

== Presidents ==
- Alexander J. McMullen, (1921–1962) (Vice: Howard Mitchell, 1928–1941, Elizabeth Orr, 1941–1947, Richard McMullen, 1947–1962)
- Richard J. McMullen, (1962–1978) (Vice: George E. Baker, 1962–1978)
- George E. Baker, (1978–1988) (Vice: George F. Mayer, 1978–1984, Jeffrey McMullen, 1984–1988)
- Jeffrey R. McMullen, (1988–2005) (Vice: John McMullen, 1991–2005)

== External sources ==
New York State Department of State (NYS DOS) and Divisions of Corporations Public Entity File(s), Olean Times Herald advertisements (OTH adv.) 1935–2003, public company memorandums (1985, 1988), Olean NY 'Root Book' (1993) sec. 96, p. 226, Rootsweb.com Incorporated, general history courtesy: Olean Lumber website (http://www.geocities.com/oleanlumber), "From the History of the Counties of McKean, Elk, Cameron, and Potter, Pennsylvania" by J.H. Beers, (Chicago, 1890) at https://web.archive.org/web/20051226154408/http://www.happeningsinthehills.com/mckean/history/otto.htm and so forth are responsible for specific dates and information detailed within the article.
