= AHMA =

AHMA may refer to:

- Austrian Holocaust Memorial Award, an Austrian award given in memory of the Holocaust
- American Hardware Manufacturers Association, a former American trade association
