= Hardware store =

Store that sells household hardware for home improvement

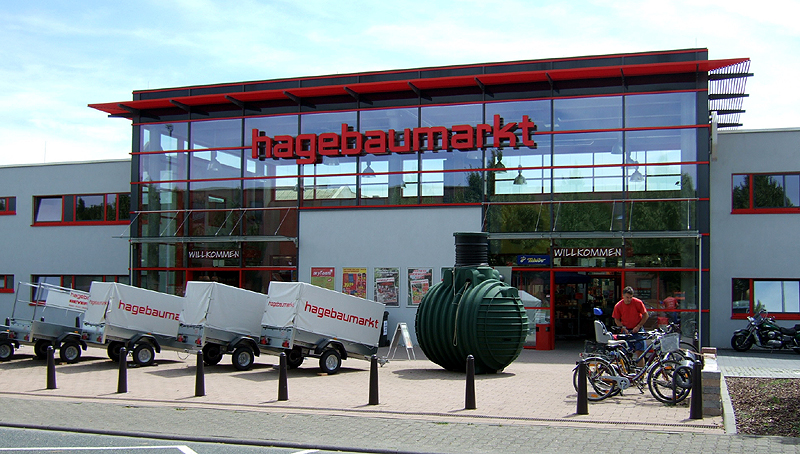
A German Hardware store

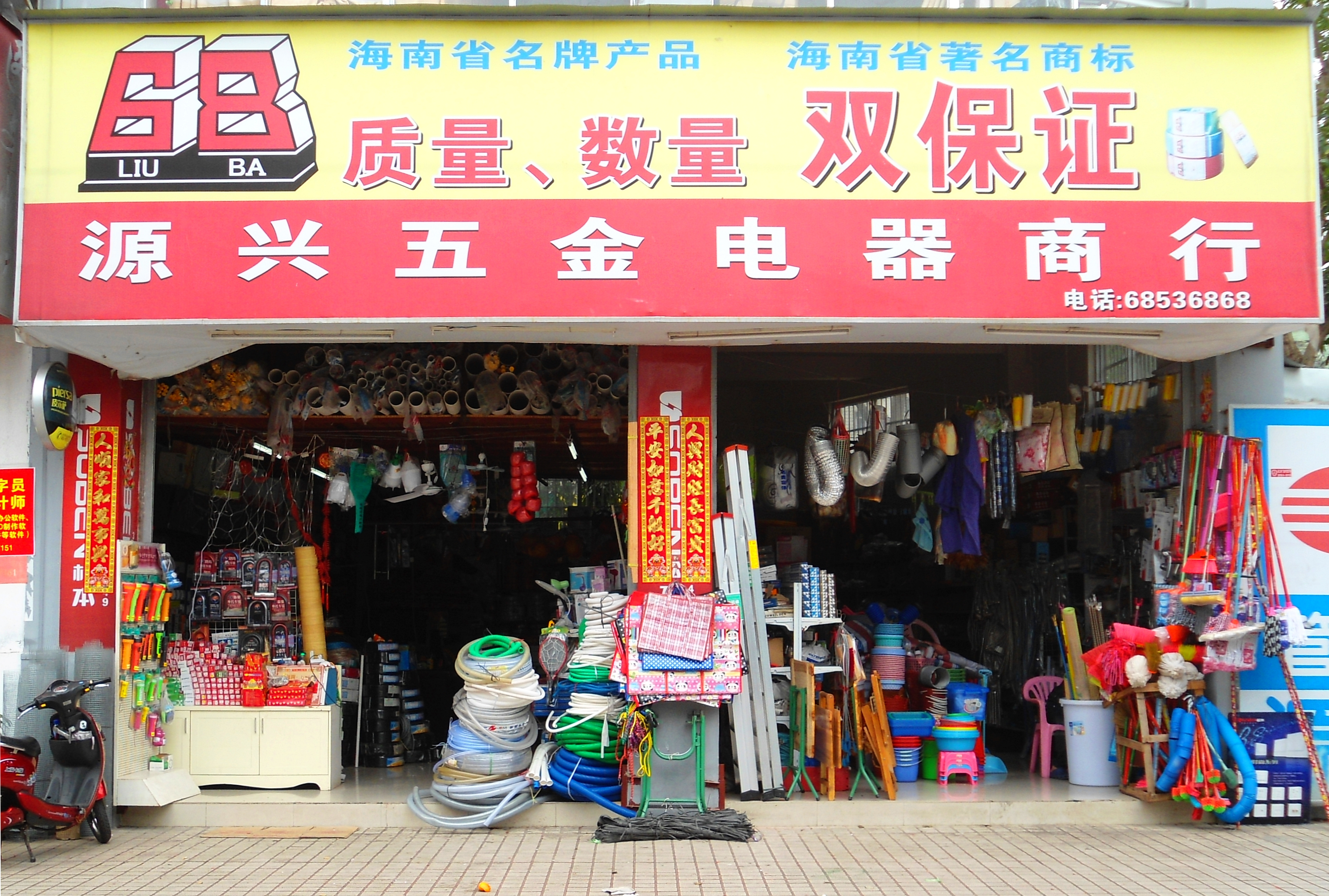
A hardware store in China. The style and products offered in this Haikou City store are typical of hundreds of thousands of hardware stores throughout the country.

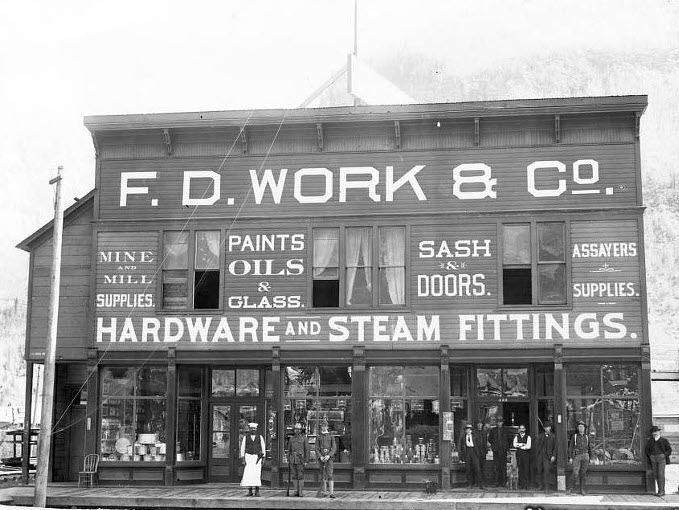
A hardware store in Telluride, Colorado c. 1903

Hardware stores (in a number of countries, "shops"), sometimes known as DIY stores, sell household hardware for home improvement including: fasteners, building materials, hand tools, power tools, keys, locks, hinges, chains, plumbing supplies, electrical supplies, cleaning products, housewares, tools, utensils, paint, and lawn and garden products directly to consumers for use at home or for business. Many hardware stores have specialty departments unique to its region or its owner's interests. These departments include hunting and fishing supplies, plants and nursery products, marine and boating supplies, pet food and supplies, farm and ranch supplies including animal feed, swimming pool chemicals, homebrewing supplies and canning supplies.

== Australia and New Zealand ==
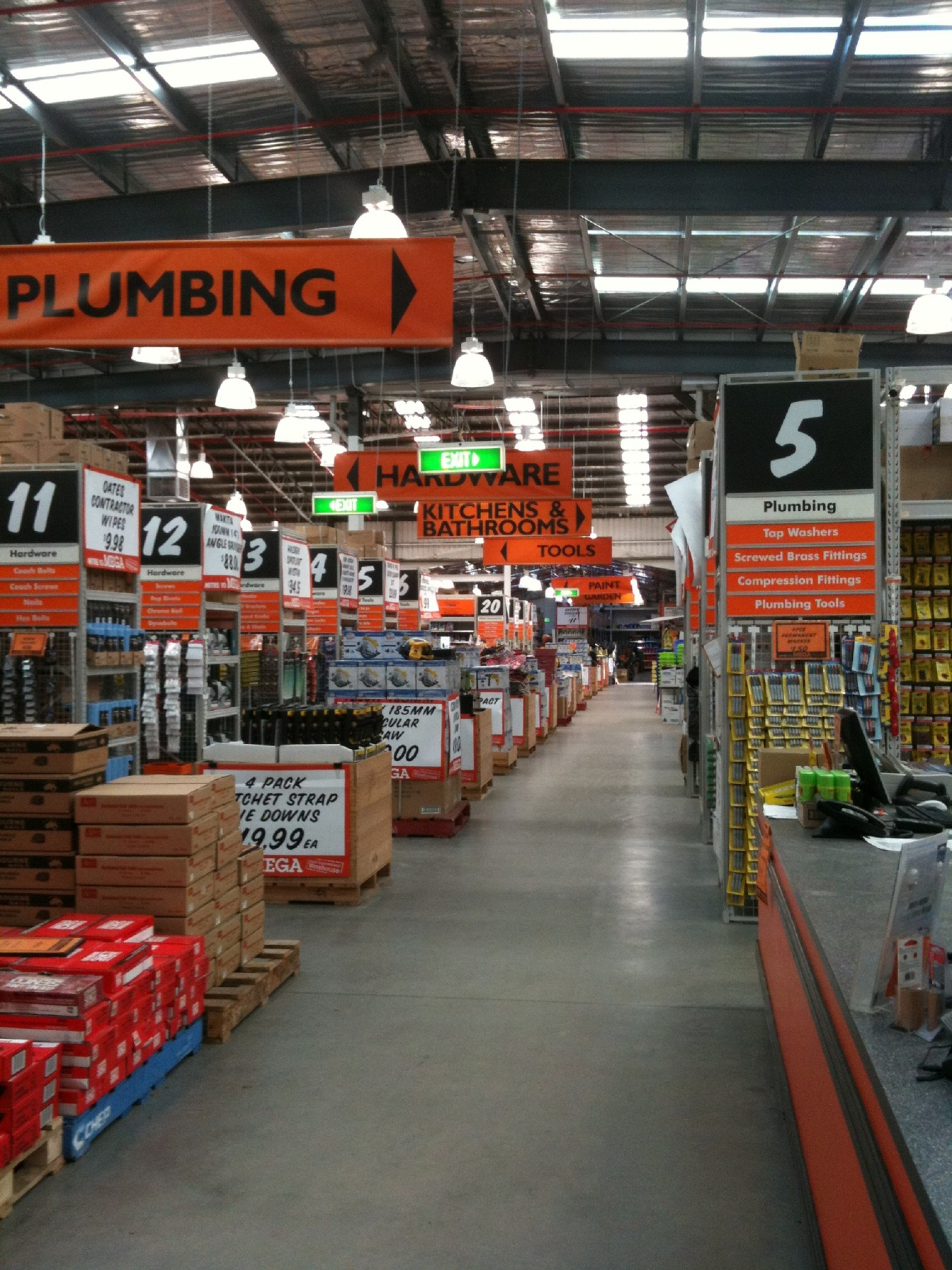
Mitre 10 MEGA store interior in Pakenham, Australia

In Australia hardware stores specialise in home décor and include large selections of paint. There are three major hardware companies in Australia: Bunnings, Mitre 10 and Home Hardware. Home Hardware is a retailers' co-operative and has many banners which store owners trade under.

Since the acquisition of Bunnings by Wesfarmers in 1994, the big-box store concept has changed how new hardware stores are built. In 2004, Mitre 10 built its first supercentre Mitre 10 MEGA with an average store size of 13,500 m^{2}. These were later either closed or turned into large-concept Mitre 10 stores. In 2011 Masters Home Improvement entered the market and opened more than 49 stores, with an average footprint of 13,500 m^{2}. Masters Home Improvement, which was the second-largest hardware chain in Australia, closed in December 2016.

Bunnings also operates in New Zealand, competing against Mitre 10 New Zealand and Hammer Hardware. The Australian Bunnings and Mitre 10 Mega format have also been introduced to New Zealand.

== Canada ==
Home Hardware, Rona, Canac, BMR Group and Réno-Dépôt are Canadian hardware retailers. Aikenhead's Hardware became the Canadian unit of The Home Depot in 1994. Canadian Tire, Central, Kent Building Supplies, Lowe's and many smaller chains also sell hardware in Canada.

== China ==
Most hardware stores in China, whether in the city or rural areas, are small, family-owned, non-franchise companies. They provide similar products to Western hardware stores, including plumbing and electrical supplies, tools, and some housewares. They do not normally carry lumber, fishing supplies, gardening products, or boating supplies. Some rural hardware stores supply animal feed, such as chicken feed.

Common to most non-Western countries, China has specialty hardware stores, dedicated to selling products in a particular category. These stores are usually grouped together in a shopping district. Examples are groups of stores that specialize in:

- Chain, carrying different sizes of chain, couplings, lifting hooks, cutters, etc.
- Generators and compressors, selling parts, hoses, plus products and tools related the maintenance and repair of generators and compressors.
- Tubing and metal rods of various sizes and materials.
- Large power tools, with accessories.
- Electrical wire and wire rope, electrical switches, fuse boxes, wire rope sockets, clamps, and thimbles.

== Europe and the Middle East ==
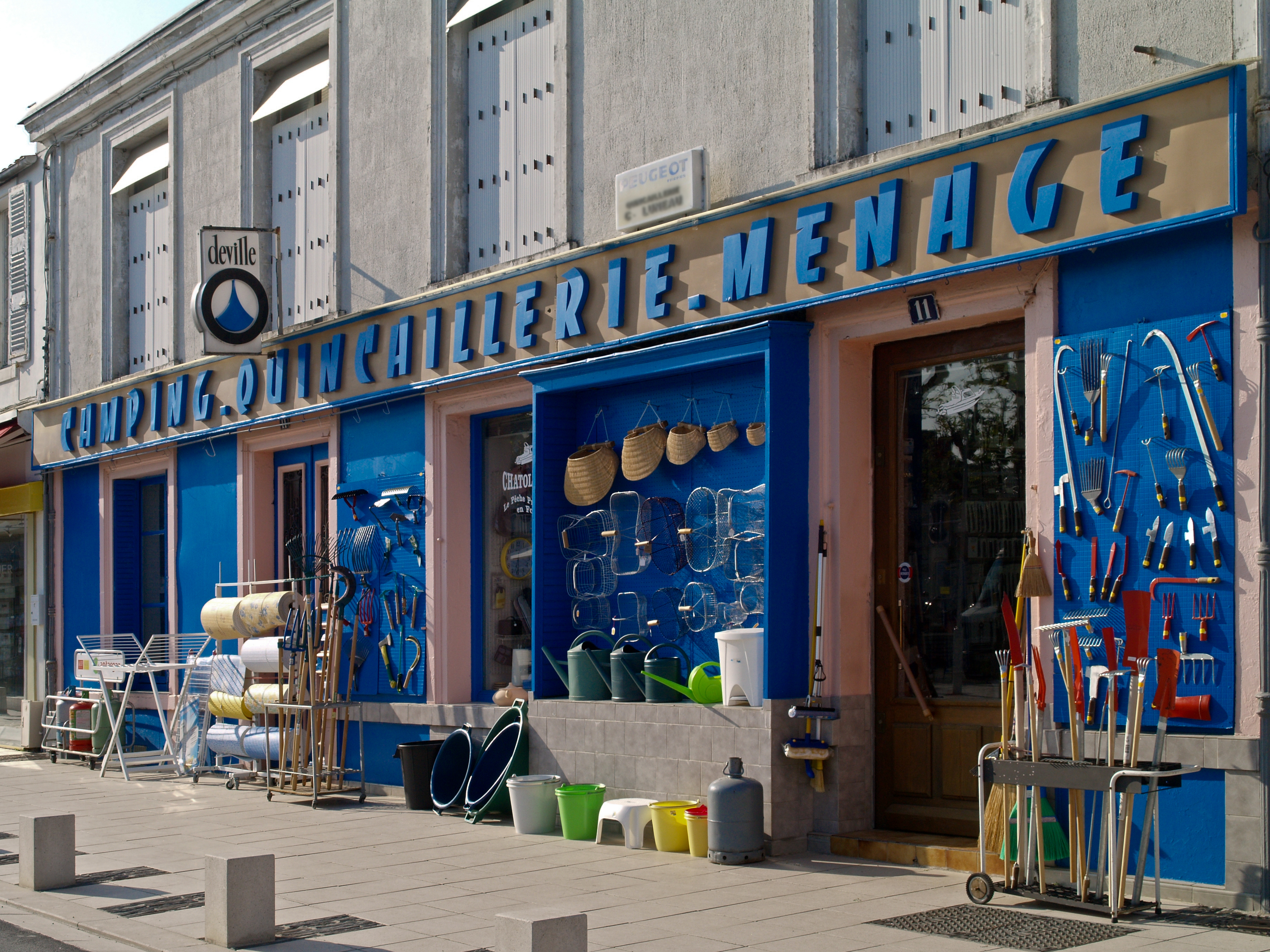
A hardware store in France

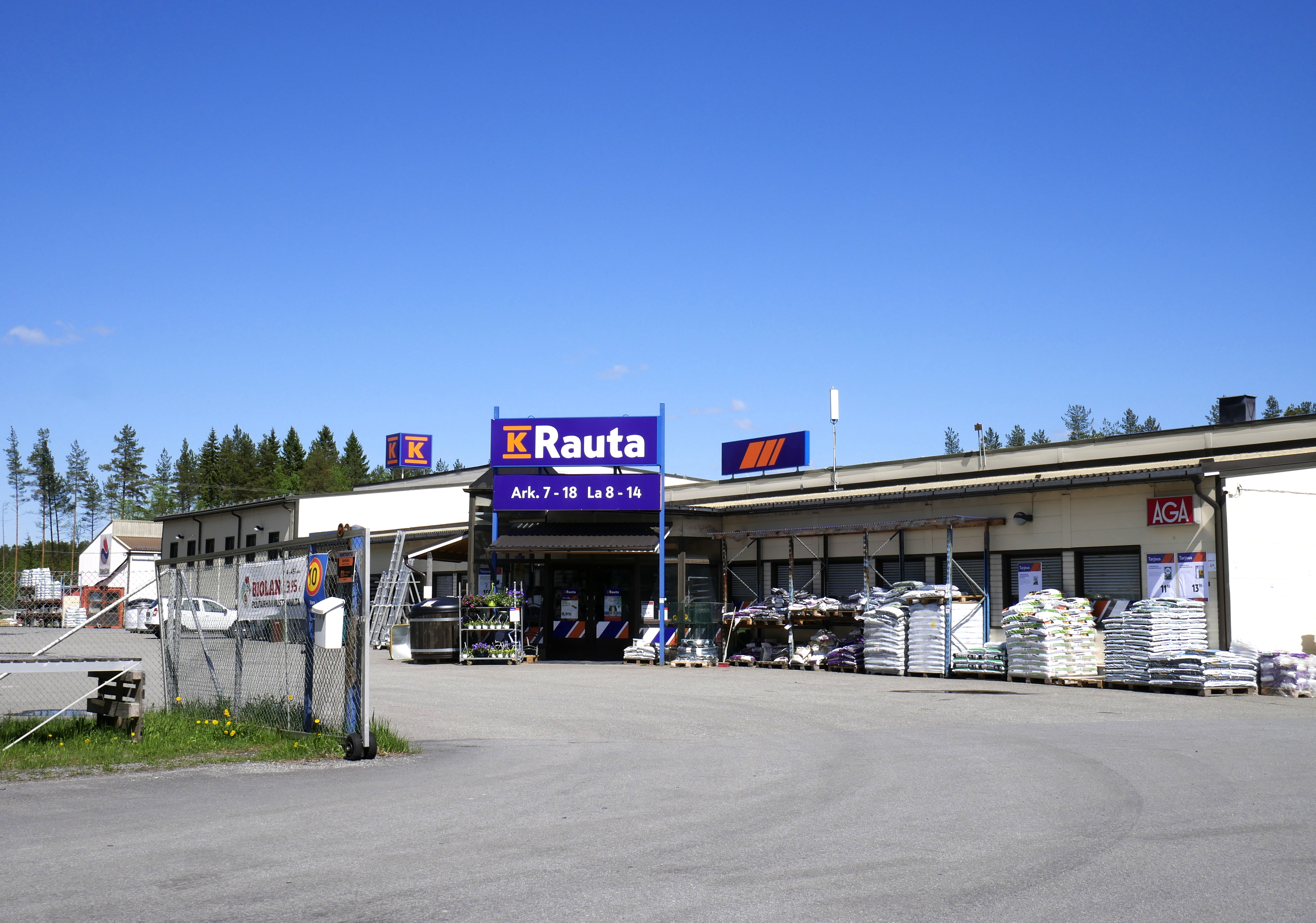
K-Rauta hardware store in Alajärvi, Finland

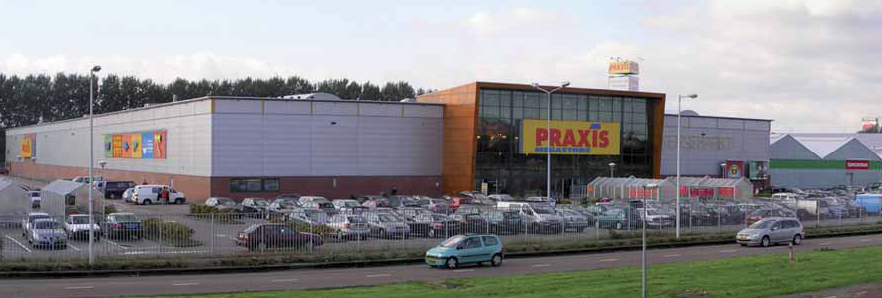
Praxis Amsterdam-Zuidoost big box store

Dedeman store in Timișoara, Romania

European-based stores include:

- Arabesque/BudMax/Mathaus
- Bauhaus
- Biltema
- Brico
- Brico Dépôt
- Bricorama
- Bricostore
- Castorama
- Clas Ohlson
- Dedeman
- EpiCentre K
- Formido
- Gamma
- Hornbach
- Hubo Belgium
- Hubo Netherlands
- Karwei
- Leroy Merlin
- Mr. Bricolage
- Obi
- Praktiker
- Praxis
- Puuilo
- SACOs Hardware
- Jernia
- Jula

=== United Kingdom ===
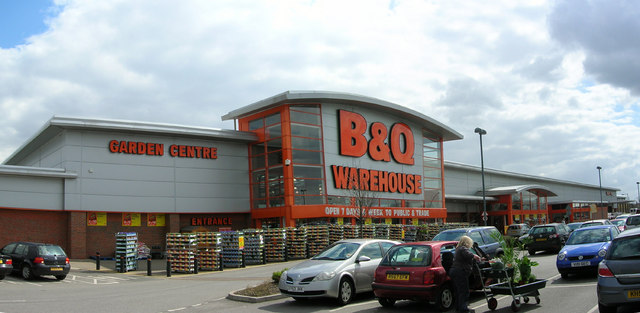
B&Q Warehouse store, Grimsby, England

In the United Kingdom, hardware stores can also be known as DIY stores and home improvement stores. The biggest chain is B&Q, followed by Wickes. Trade counter retailers are also popular, including Screwfix and Toolstation, where customers collect their order from a desk.

== India ==
In India hardware stores are mostly small businesses, with no major store chains that carry a large selection of products. Stores lack ample floor space compared to their Western counterparts, but are usually stocked with a wide variety of items.

Indian hardware stores are similar to hardware stores around the world, offering products from several categories such as plumbing, machinery, household, gardening, manufacturing, cobbler, carpenter, and electrical.

== Pakistan ==
Hardware stores in Pakistan vary from small family-owned shops to large wholesale markets. Major cities like Karachi, Lahore, and Islamabad have well-established hardware markets catering to contractors, electricians, and DIY enthusiasts.

Some of the well-known hardware markets in Pakistan include:

- Lighthouse Market (Karachi) – Specialises in electrical supplies, plumbing, and tools.
- Hall Road (Lahore) – A hub for electronic and hardware supplies.
- Rawalpindi Saddar Market – Offers a wide range of construction and industrial hardware.

Many stores import tools and materials from China, the UAE, and Europe, while local manufacturers also contribute to the supply chain. The rise of e-commerce platforms like Daraz and OLX Pakistan has also enabled online hardware sales.

== United States ==
Advertisement for hardware dealers from Neville's Macon Directory and Advertiser for 1869 - 1870

Larger hardware stores may also sell building supplies including lumber, flooring, roofing materials and fencing. Such stores are often referred to as home improvement centers or home centers.

There may be fewer hardware stores in the US now than in the past, but according to the US Census Bureau, there were still 14,300 hardware stores in the US in 2005, employing on average 10 employees each. Despite competition from large chain stores (commonly referred to as big-box or destination hardware stores, e.g., The Home Depot, Lowe's and Menards) new hardware stores in the US continue to open.

There are four major nationwide wholesale suppliers to hardware stores. All four report more than US$1 billion in annual sales. Two of them operate as retailers' cooperatives: Do It Best Corp, from Fort Wayne, Indiana, and Ace Hardware from Oak Brook, Illinois. Hardware store owners purchase stock in these suppliers and may choose to include the name of the cooperative in the advertised name of the store.

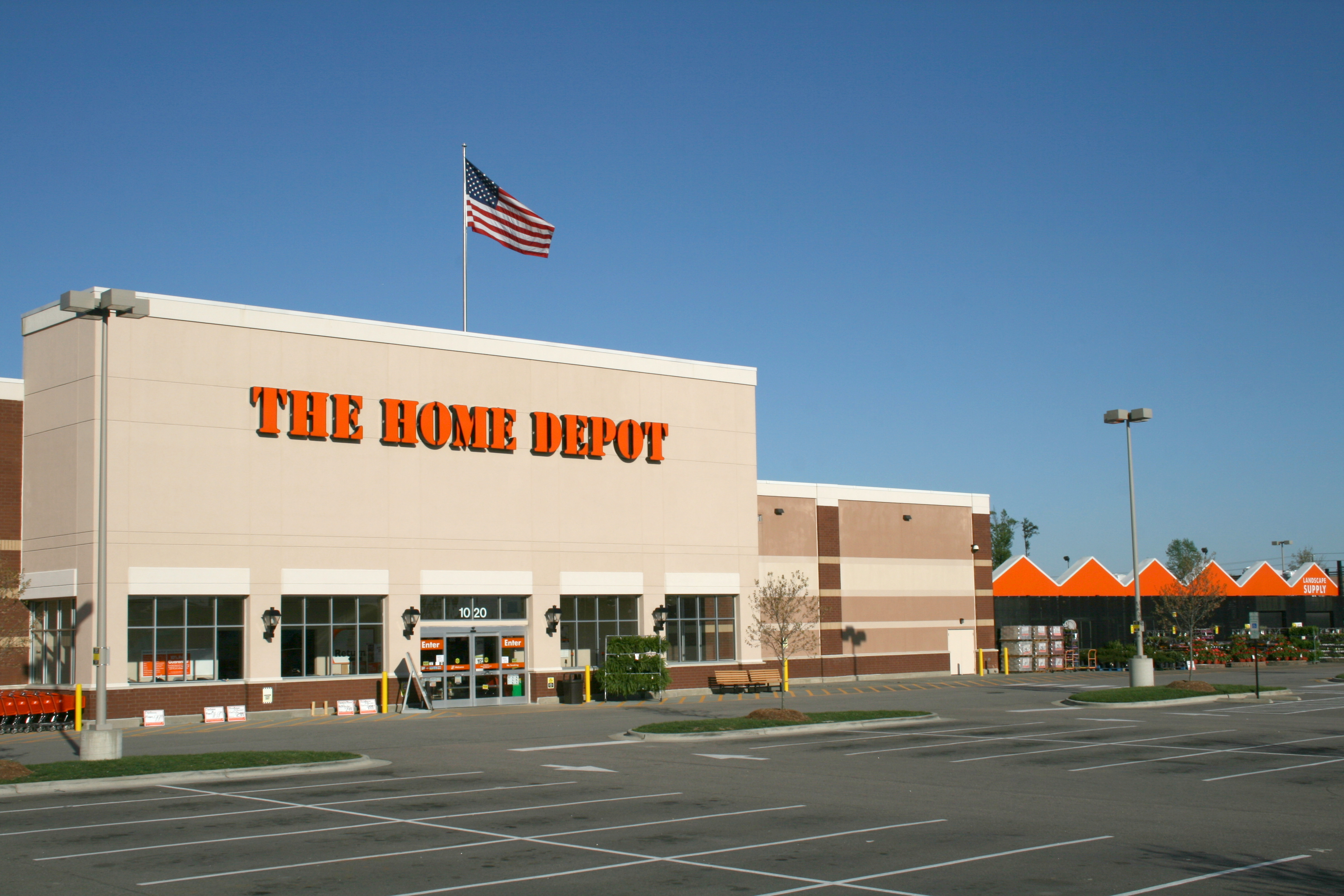
A typical Home Depot store

Hardware stores also purchase from a variety of regional wholesalers and specialty manufacturers. Some hardware stores operate rental businesses which can offer equipment from construction tools to inflatable playhouses. The major hardware cooperatives provide brand name rental advertising and support for hardware store owners including Just Ask Rental, Party Central, Grand Rental Station and Taylor Rental, all four of which are brands owned by the True Value Company.

=== Unique services in hardware stores ===
Part of the popularity of American hardware stores is the range of services they provide. Most retail outlets only sell goods, while some hardware stores custom-make or repair a large variety of household items. It is common for a hardware store in the US to repair broken windows and screens, repair power equipment such as lawn mowers, re-key entry locks, make copies of house keys and car keys, re-wire lamps and vacuum cleaners, sharpen knives and cutting tools, make minor repairs to faucet and shower parts, repair kerosene heaters and cut and thread plumbing pipe.

=== Hardware industry trade association ===
The North American Retail Hardware Association (NRHA) is a membership organization that provides training and resources for hardware store owners and publishes a trade magazine in print and online.

== See also ==
- American Hardware Manufacturers Association
- National Hardware Show
- DIY Week
