= Arabesque (company) =

- Industry: Retail
- Founded: 1994; 32 years ago
- Founder: Cezar Rapotan
- Headquarters: Galați, Romania
- Number of locations: 35 (2020)
- Area served: Romania, Moldova, Bulgaria and Ukraine
- Products: Building materials
- Number of employees: 3,000 (2018)
- Website: arabesque.ro

Arabesque is a Romanian company which distributes building materials and operates hardware stores with headquarters in Galați.

The company consists of seven Mathaus DIY stores and 22 Arabesque warehouses in Romania. It also operates six warehouses in Moldova, Bulgaria and Ukraine.

== History ==
The company was founded in 1994 and is owned by Romanian businessman Cezar Rapotan who also owns shares of the manufacturer of steel structures Sibel FIERCTC and the energy company Chorus Marketing and Distribution.

The first warehouse outside Romania was opened in 2005, in Chișinău, Moldova, as Arabesque Construct.

In July 2006, Arabesque acquired the Budmax network, the third largest player in the building materials business-to-business market in Ukraine. By 2020 Arabesque only operated 3 of the 10 warehouses that still operate under the Budmax brand in Ukraine.

In Bulgaria, Arabesque also owns a Budmax warehouse in Sofia since 2006 and in Burgas since 2016
