= Karwei =

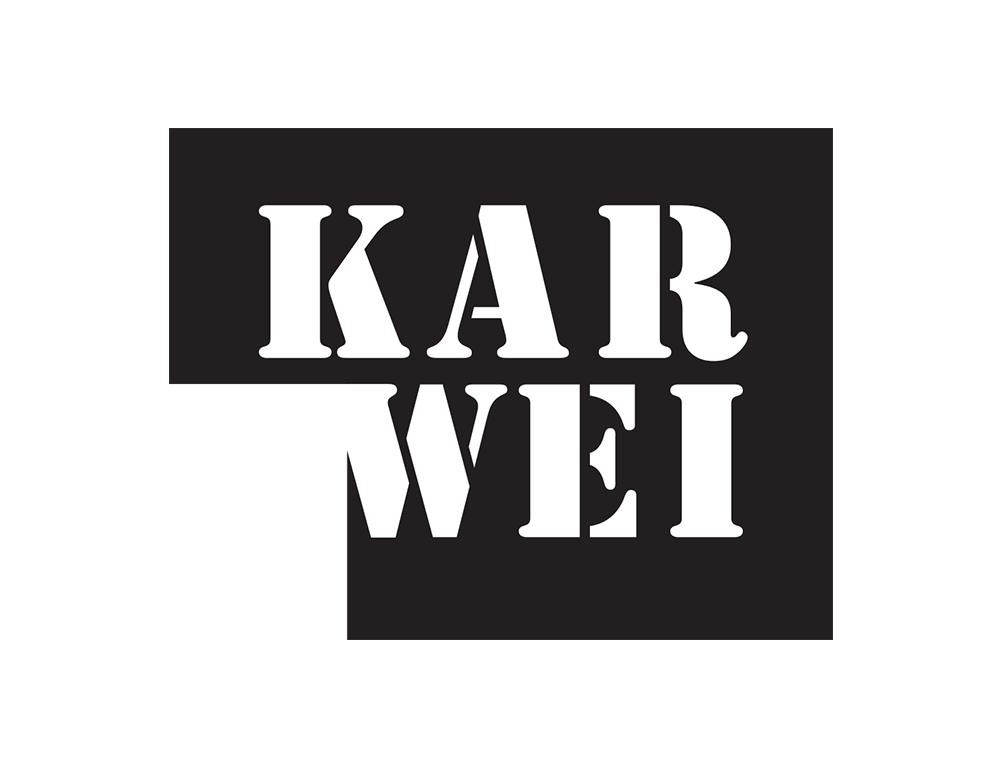

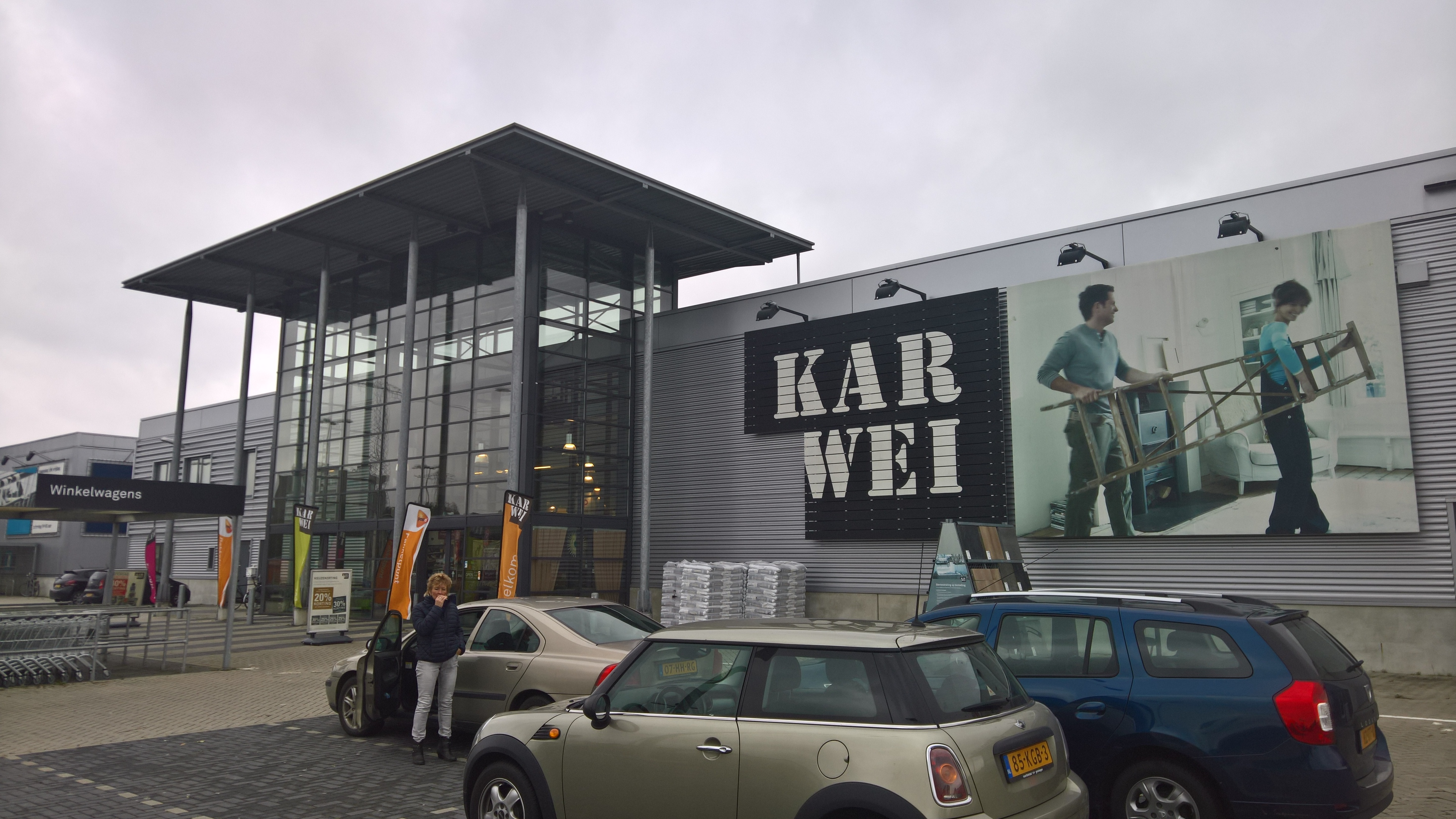
- Industry: Retail
- Founded: 14 May 1975 (in Utrecht)
- Headquarters: Leusden, Netherlands
- Number of locations: 136 stores
- Area served: Netherlands
- Products: Hardware stores
- Owner: Intergamma

Karwei is a Dutch Hardware store-chain. In 1991 Karwei Holland Nationaal B.V. became part of the franchise-organisation Intergamma, which headquarters is located in Leusden. As of 2019 Karwei has 136 stores, all of which are located in the Netherlands. Intergamma also owns the Home Improvement Centre chain Gamma. The first store opened at May 14, 1975 in Utrecht.

In 2008 Karwei had a revenue of 392 million euro.
