= American Hardware Manufacturers Association =

Logo of the American Hardware Manufacturers Association (AHMA)

The American Hardware Manufacturers Association (AHMA), founded in 1901, was a trade association headquartered in Schaumburg, Illinois, serving U.S. manufacturers who produced goods in the "hardlines" industry, including the product categories of household hardware, tools, lawn and garden, paint and decor, major appliances, sports, and toys. After years of dwindling membership, the AHMA dissolved in 2017.

Any international firm or corporation engaged in the manufacture or marketing of products for the hardware channel was eligible to become a non-voting associate member. Manufacturers' agents and industry trade publications could also join as non-voting associate members.

AHMA served the hardlines industry in many ways, including cost savings and educational programs. The association provided industry conferences, events and workshops; legislative representation in Washington; domestic and international marketing support; technology initiatives; cost-saving programs; targeted publications; networking opportunities; and many other industry-directed services.
