= Biltema =

Swedish company

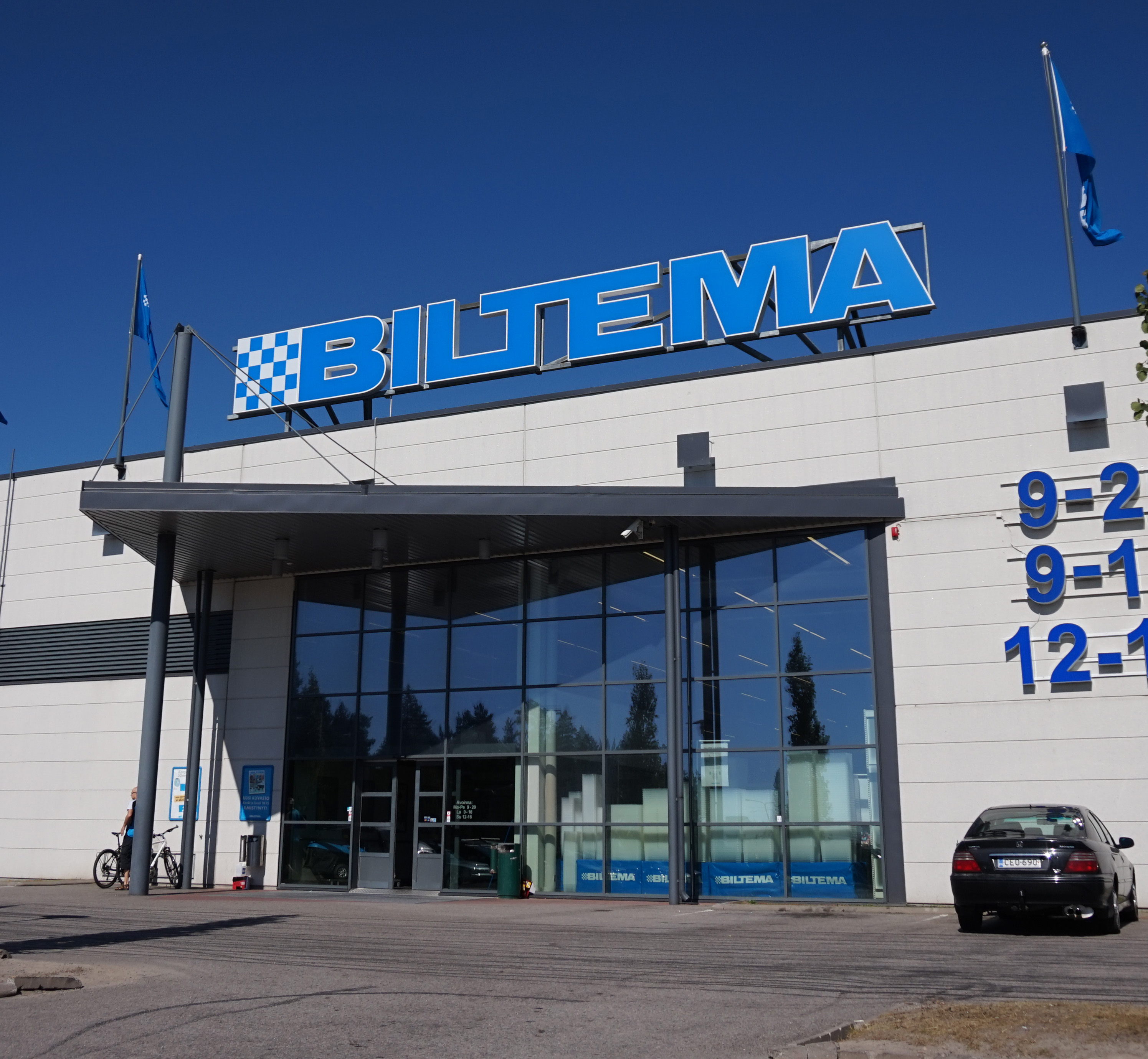
- Company type: Private
- Genre: Retail (Specialty)
- Founded: Linköping, Östergötland, Sweden (1963)
- Founder: Sten Åke Lindholm
- Headquarters: Gothenburg, Sweden
- Area served: All Nordic countries except Iceland
- Products: Tools, household hardware, garden supplies, electrical supplies, car parts
- Parent: Biltema Holding
- Website: www.biltema.com

Biltema is a Swedish chain of retail stores, specializing in tools, car supplies and leisure products. Founded in 1963 in Linköping, Sweden, Biltema also has stores in Finland, Norway and Denmark. The company is owned privately by founder Sten Åke Lindholm, through Dutch company Biltema BV.

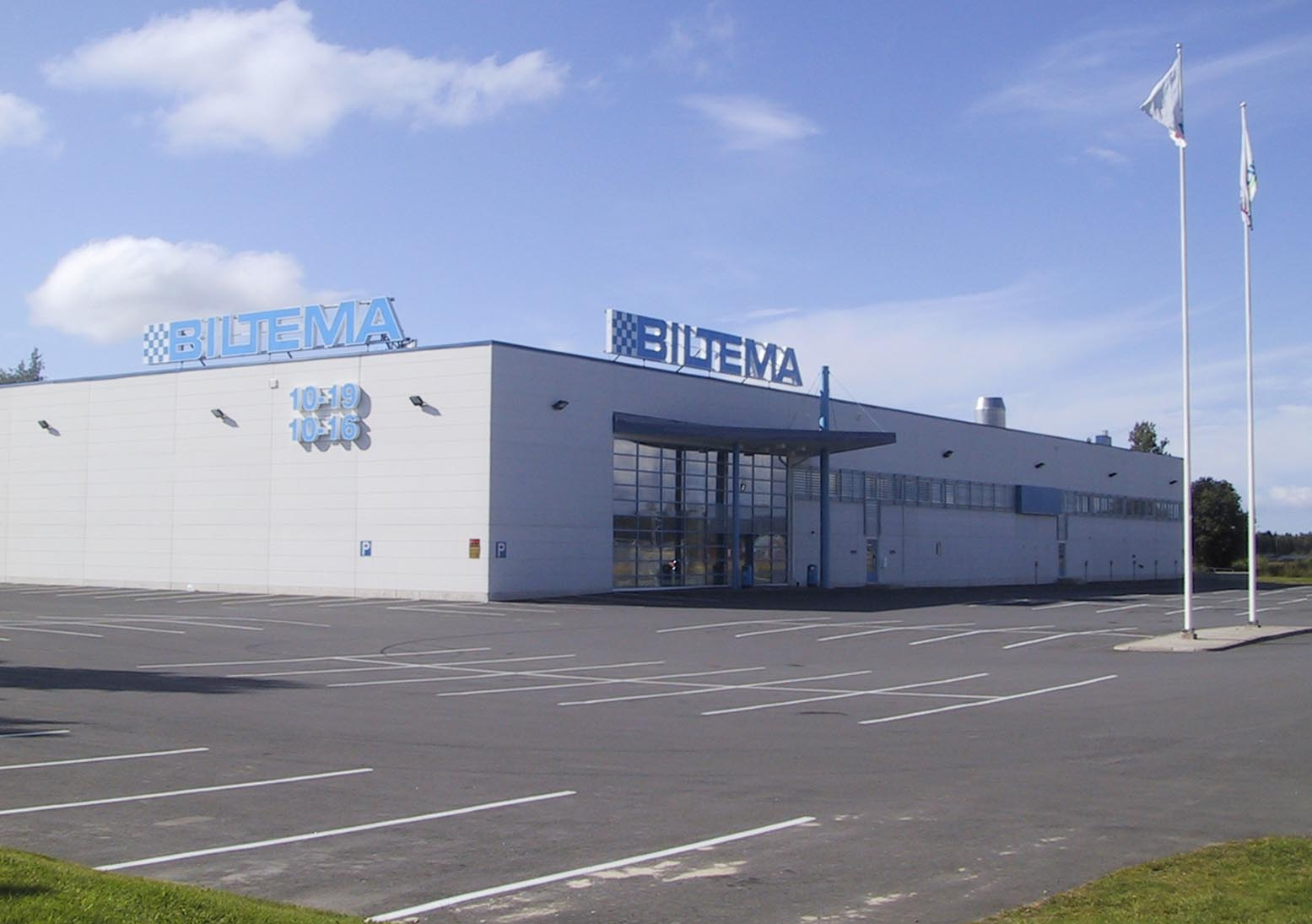
Biltema in Kempele, North Ostrobothnia, Finland

== History ==
In 1963 the company was established under the name "General Partnership Biltema". Their business was mail order sales of automotive parts and accessories. Initially, the company was operated from a small basement in Linköping, Sweden. After a year, the firm expanded their mail-order business with a small shop, also in the same basement.

The policy of buying directly from the manufacturer led Biltema to investigate where the various products were made. In the late 1970s, the company began building strategic sourcing contacts around the world.

In 1976, sales rose, and the company moved to Torvinge near Linköping. The store then expanded to about 2,700 square meters in the early 1980s. In 1983, Biltema opened its first store outside Sweden in Norway, followed by one in Finland in 1985.
