= Gamma (store) =

GAMMA
- Industry: Retail
- Founded: 11 May 1971
- Headquarters: Leusden, Netherlands
- Area served: Netherlands, Belgium
- Products: Hardware stores
- Owner: Intergamma

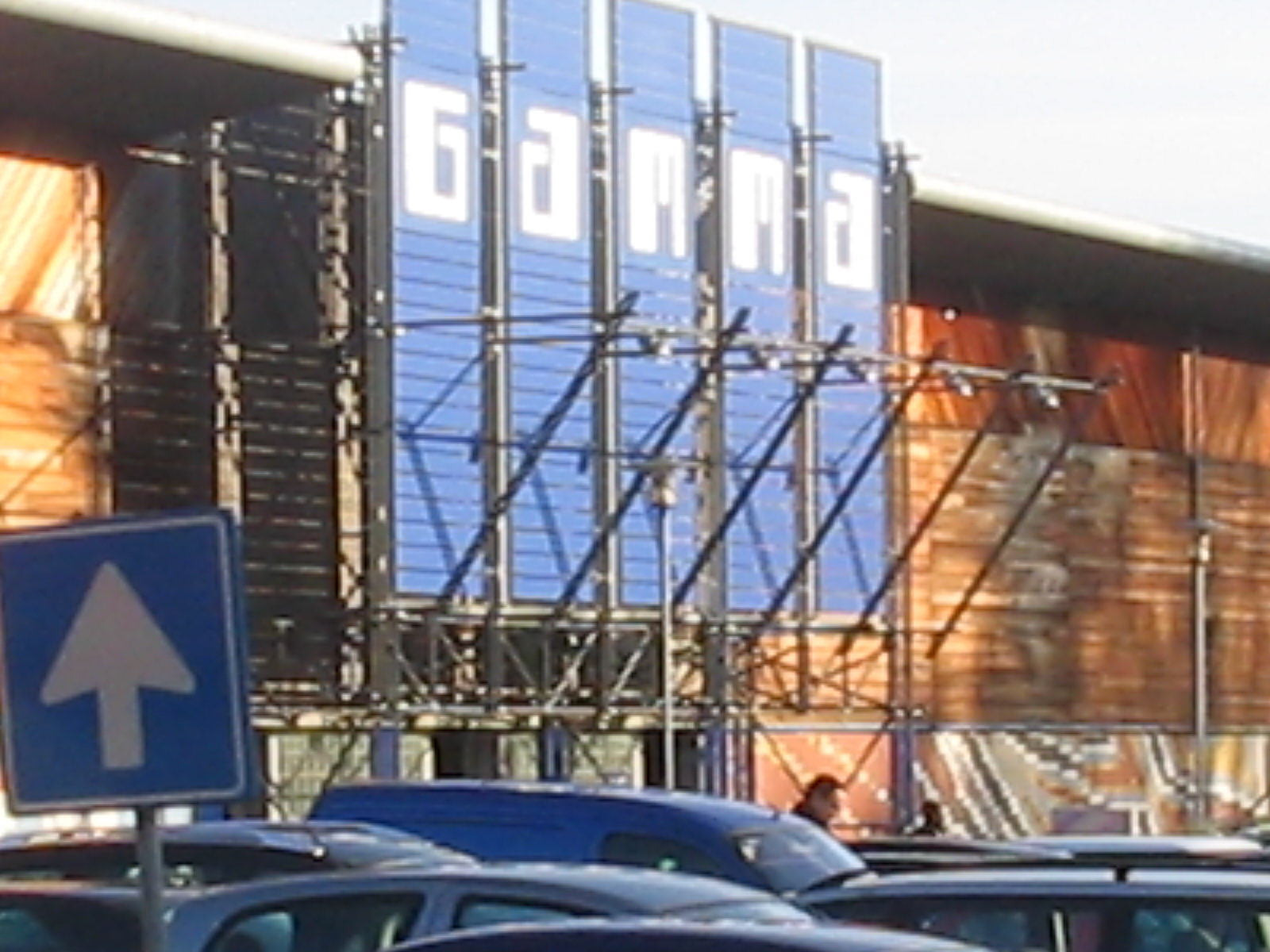
A Gamma shop in Delft

GAMMA is a Dutch Hardware store-chain. It started on May 11, 1971 in Breda. The headquarters of the franchise-organisation Intergamma is located in Leusden and as of 2011 it has 245 stores, of which 164 are located in the Netherlands and 81 in Belgium. Intergamma also owns the Hardware store-chain Karwei.

== History ==
In 2008 GAMMA had a revenue of 606 million euro.

GAMMA commercials have been broadcast in the Netherlands on radio and television since 1994, and have made the actors John Buijsman and Martin van Waardenberg well known in the Netherlands. In Flanders Luk Wyns is the face of the company.
