= Hubo Belgium =

Belgian hardware store chain

Hubo is a Belgian hardware store-chain. Hubo Belgium and Hubo Netherlands are two separate entities. The headquarters of Hubo Belgium is located in Wommelgem. In 2019, Hubo had over 150 stores spread across Belgium. Hubo Belgium was founded in 1992 after Hubo Netherlands sold its subsidiary (founded in 1972) to three of the local management team.

Hubo focusses its activities on the DIY branch. The number of products in a Hubo store go up to 25.000 for indoor and outdoor uses. The stores have surfaces going from 2000m² up to 3000m². On the Belgian DIY branch, Hubo holds a strong second place.

The Hubo stores are situated out of the city centers.

Since 2006, Hubo is a member of Bricoalliance.
