= Hubo Netherlands =

Dutch hardware store chain

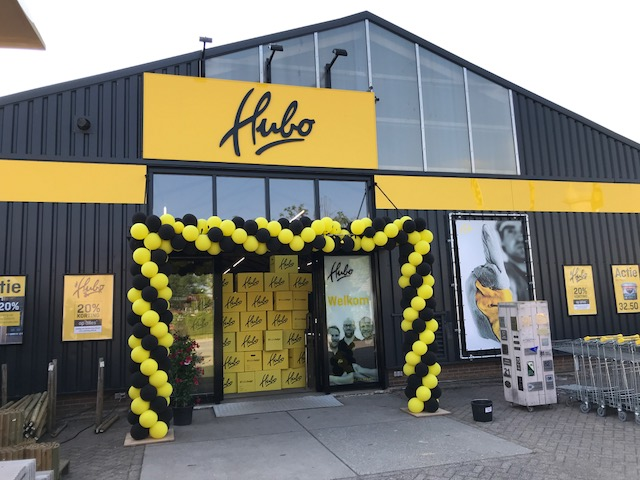
A Hubo store in Meerkerk, 2018

Hubo is a Dutch hardware store chain. Hubo Netherlands and Hubo Belgium are two separate entities. Hubo is part of the franchise-organisation DGN Retail, which headquarters is located in Apeldoorn. DGN Retail also owns the Hardware store-chains Multimate Service Bouwmarkt, Fixet and Doeland. Hubo is the oldest Hardware store franchise in the Netherlands, starting its franchising business in 1969. As of 2011, Hubo has over 200 stores, all of which are located in the Netherlands, making it the largest Hardware store-chain in the Netherlands in number of stores.

In 1996, Hubo had a revenue of 116 million euro. In 2004, the revenue of Hubo was 151 million euro and Hubo, Doeland and Big Boss had a combined revenue of 291 million euro. In 2009, Hubo, Doeland and Big Boss had a combined revenue of 237 million euro.

== History ==
Hubo was founded as Houthandel Utrecht Bedrijven Organisatie. Houthandel is Dutch for trade in wood. Houthandel Utrecht started in the 1930s as a wood shop. When the organisation started delivering hardware to customers this got a bad reaction from some building companies, and they decided to separate this selling of hardware from the wood industry. Several shops were opened under the name Houtribo, and the number of shops grew quickly, which would be the base for the Hubo Hardware store-chain. From 1967, the organisation started franchising, and in 1969 the name Hubo was used for the franchise organisations. In 1972, Hubo also started opening shops in Belgium, and in 1974 there were over 200 Hubo shops.

In the 1970s, ownership changed a couple of times and in the 1980 Hubo was sold to KBB (the current Maxeda), together with Formido which was also founded by Houthandel Utrecht. The Hardware store-chain Praxis was already part of KBB at the time. In the 1990s, Vendex/KBB sold Hubo Belgium to three Belgian investors and sold Hubo Netherlands to the HDB-group, the franchise organisation behind Houtland, Doeland and Big Boss. HDB-group decided to limit itself to three chains and the 120 Houtland stores were merged into Hubo.

In 2004, Interdetail, the franchise organisation behind Idee voor Vakwerk, went up into HDB-group. The Idee voor vakwerk stores were merged with Hubo and Doeland.

In July 2007, HDB-group fused with Serboucom from Enschede, the franchise organisation behind Multimate, Oxxo en Hout-drive. From the fusion came the new organisation Doe-het-zelf Groep Nederland, DGN Retail. After the fusion Big Boss and Multimate were combined into Multimate Service Bouwmarkt.

On 1 January 2011, DGN Retail merged 24 Doeland stores into Hubo. Some larger Doeland shops went over to Multimate Service Bouwmarkt. At the same time the Hubo slogan was changed from 'Hubo, de eerste, de beste' (hubo, the first, the best) into 'Hubo, Overtref jezelf' (Hubo, surpass yourself).

On 1 January 2011, Reesink Retail bv, the franchise organisation behind Fixet, joined DGN-Retail.
