= Household hardware =

Equipment used for work in the home

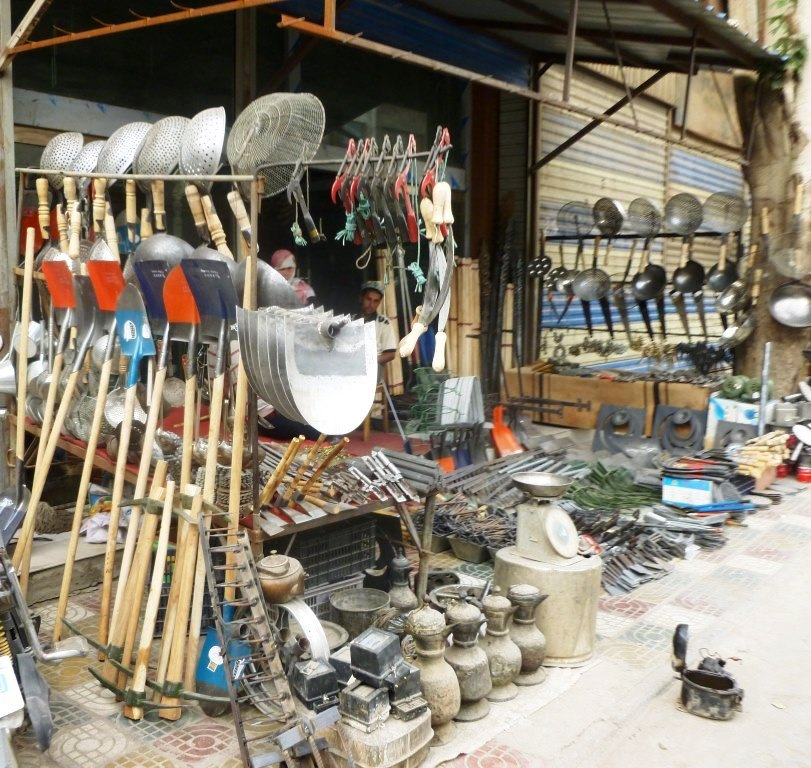
Hardware store. Yarkand.

Household hardware are hardware generally used in residential settings; such as keys, locks, nuts, screws, washers, hinges, latches, handles, wire, chains, belts, plumbing supplies, electrical supplies, tools, utensils, cutlery and machine parts. Household hardware is typically sold in hardware stores.

== See also ==
- Builders hardware
