= The Outlets at Montehiedra =

Shopping mall located in San Juan, Puerto Rico

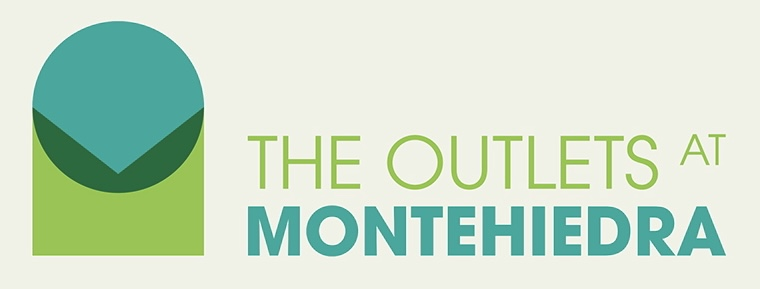

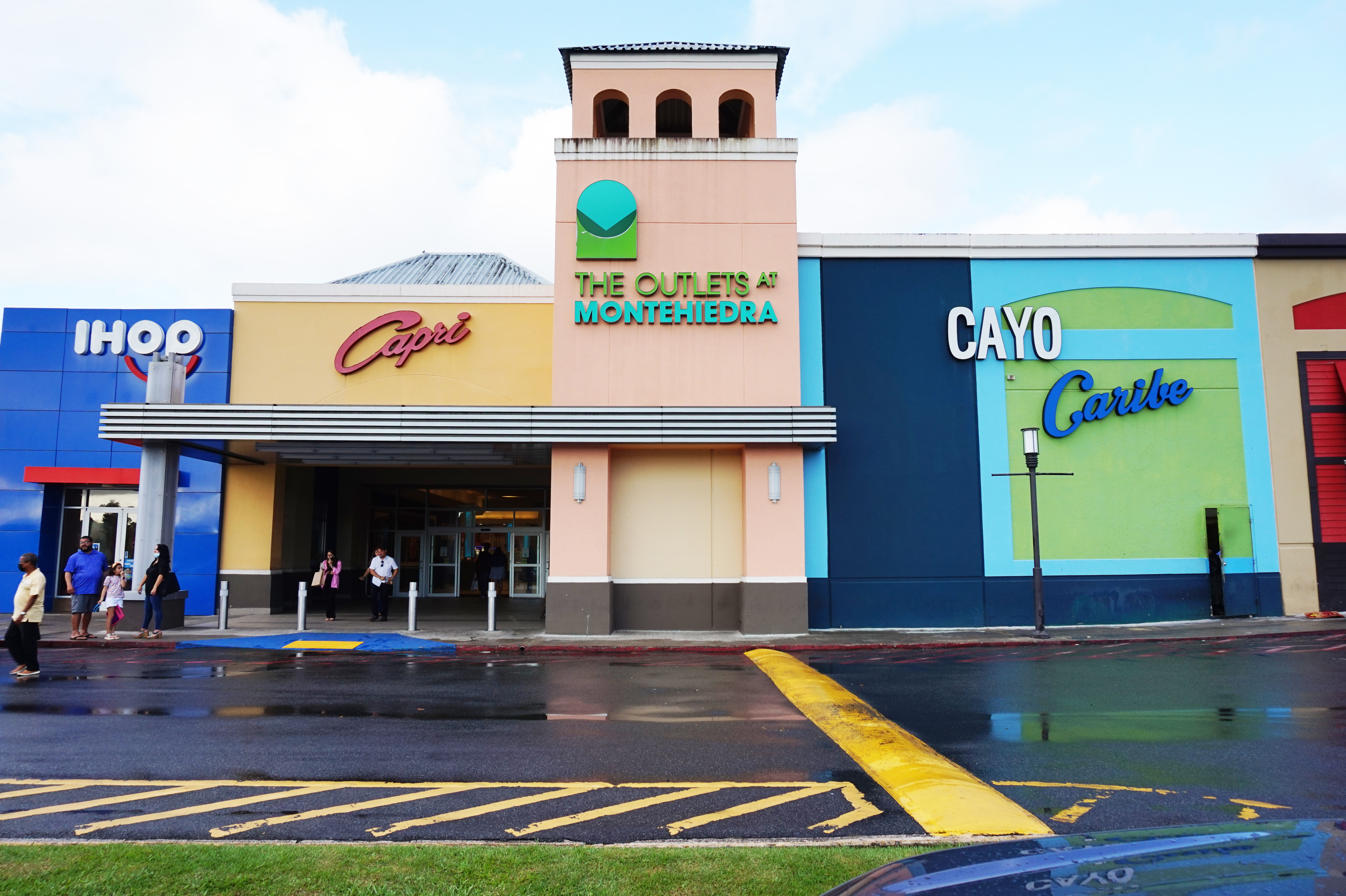
- Hallway at the shopping mall
- Location: San Juan, Puerto Rico
- Coordinates: 18°20′21″N 66°4′5″W
- Address: 9410 Ave. Los Romero, Suite 120 San Juan, PR 00926
- Opened: 1994
- Previous names: Montehiedra Town Center
- Developer: Manley Berenson, Yebba Realty Ventures, Kmart Corporation
- Owner: Urban Edge Properties
- Num. of stores: 100+
- Num. of anchor tenants: 6 (5 open, 1 vacant)
- Floor area: 533,390 sq ft (49,554 m^{2})
- Floors: 1
- Parking: 3,050
- Website: https://www.montehiedratowncenter.com/

The Outlets at Montehiedra, formerly known as the Montehiedra Town Center, is an enclosed shopping mall in San Juan, Puerto Rico. Anchor stores for the mall are a Marshalls MegaStore, Burlington, Old Navy, and a Home Depot as an out parcel. The former Kmart, which served as an anchor to the mall from the very beginning which closed in 2021, has found replacement primarily by a Ralph's Food Warehouse and a TJ Maxx. It was also formerly anchored by a Tiendas Capri which closed in 2024, now being replaced by a Burlington. The mall additionally features a 14-screen Caribbean Cinemas.

== History ==
=== Opening and success: 1990s ===
The Montehiedra Town Center was developed by Manley Berenson, Yebba Realty Ventures, and the Kmart Corporation. It initially opened in 1994 with the anchor stores of Kmart, Marshalls and Builders Square. It also featured a Caribbean Cinemas and a Discovery Zone.

In 1997, Vornado Realty Trust would acquire the mall for $74 million.

=== Expanding: 2000s ===
In 2001, the Montehiedra Town Center was anchored by a Kmart, Masso, Marshalls, and a 14-screen Caribbean Cinemas. It featured establishments such as KB Toys, RadioShack, Payless ShoeSource, Rave, Spec's Music, Sunglass Hut, J. Riggings, Marianne, GNC, 5-7-9, Baker's Shoes, Claire's, and others. The center also had a very successful food court with over a dozen choices such as Sbarro, Wetzel's Pretzels, Taco Maker, and others. Small store sales approaching $500 per square foot confirmed that Montehiedra was a premier shopping destination in Puerto Rico.

On November 8, 2003, it was reported that Marshalls had opened its fifth megastore in Puerto Rico, a 56,000 square foot outlet at the Montehiedra Town Center, with 100 employees, said Angelo Mercado, the chain's island spokesman. This would convert the original Marshalls store at the mall into the “megastore” concept. Marshalls opened its first megastores on the island starting in 1999. The first two were at Plaza Caparra in Guaynabo and Bayamon Shopping Center. The other two were in Carolina and the Mayagüez Mall.

On November 27, 2003, it was reported that the operators of Montehiedra Town Center were negotiating with six or seven new tenants to achieve full occupancy of the 500,000 square foot mall in the first quarter of 2004, said Alfred R. Yebba, chief operating officer of Berenson Associates. Yebba said the new additions would catapult the property into a leadership position in the mid-to-southern part of the San Juan metro area. The new tenant mix also fitted in nicely with a plan to attract more family oriented businesses and create an environment that was fun and interesting, he said. Montehiedra was the focus of Berenson's attention as part of a corporate directive to transform the mall into a more family-oriented shopping center. Yebba said Montehiedra was an upscale area that has become a magnet for residential developments geared to families. “We are (trying) to move the property in that direction," he said. One tenant that would move to Montehiedra that following year was Chili's Restaurant. A 6,300 square foot restaurant that was scheduled to begin construction in that early January and to open for business in the summer of 2004. "The addition of this type of family-style restaurant to Montehiedra is exciting because it fits perfectly with our plans for the property," said Yebba. Marshalls' outlet at Montehiedra had been re-inaugurated as a 60,000 square foot Mega Store, doubling its previous size, which enabled it to carry a greater assortment of merchandise.

On March 18, 2004, it was reported that Walmart was wrapping up negotiations for an Amigo Supermarket in the Montehiedra Town Center and was seeking to expand in the island's western region. The Amigo in Montehiedra would occupy 26,273 square feet, according to industry sources close to the company. Massachusetts-based architectural firm Arrowstreet was in charge of designing and constructing the supermarket. Sources said Pueblo and CompUSA were interested in this space, but the mall's executives decided in favor of Amigo.

On September 22, 2005, it was reported that the Montehiedra Town Center wouldn't have any vacant spaces. Five retailers Tiendas Capri, Bared, Romano's Macaroni Grill, Le Club, and Clark's have opened or confirmed plans to open at the mall, and another four or five were eyeing locations there. Río Piedras' Montehiedra Town Center, built in 1994, had around 550,000 square feet and was Puerto Rico's 13th-largest shopping center. In its 2004 annual report, parent company Vornado Realty Trust explained Montehiedra had an occupancy rate of 89.1%. That percentage was about to go up. Capri had just opened its 18th store, which occupied 32,000 square feet, at Montehiedra. The store, built with an $800,000 investment, employed some 50 people, said chain President Jorge Carlos Pica. Another retailer that opened in Montehiedra was jewelry chain Bared, which invested $500,000 in the new store. This was actually an expanded version of a smaller store the company had at the mall. The store was relocated within the mall, and its space was almost doubled to 1,600 square feet.

On August 17, 2006, it was reported that the Montehiedra Town Center executives were working on plans to completely revamp the shopping mall the following year. Meanwhile, they were welcoming new tenants and launching a marketing campaign called "Destapa lo nuevo" (Uncover what's new). "Next year we plan to completely remodel the mall, including interiors and exteriors," said General Manager Angel Cordero. "We are still in the design phase, but we know the project will require an investment that will surpass $1 million," he said, adding there is a possibility more square footage would be built. The mall was also getting ready to receive many new tenants between that week and October. Aldo Shoes would occupy 2,100 square feet; Limited Edition for Her would have 2,000 square feet; shoe chain Aerosoles will occupy 1,500 square feet; Nestle Toll House Café would have 900 square feet; restaurant Johnny Rockets would have 2,400 square feet, and Al Fuego, a Latin restaurant, would occupy 1,200 square feet. In addition, Bostonian had remodeled its 1,300-square foot store and Valija Gitana, which operated from a kiosk in the mall for a few years, would be moving to a 750 square foot space. Romano's Macaroni Grill had an opening for its 7,000 square foot restaurant opening that same month. These were just some of the many stores opening at the Montehiedra Town Center at the time.

=== Decline and revitalization: 2010s ===
On February 28, 2013, it was reported that the Montehiedra Town Center mall in Río Piedras, hit hard by the recession in Puerto Rico, was about to hit back with quite a punch. New York City-based owner Vornado Realty Trust, the fifth largest commercial real-estate holder in the U.S., would convert Montehiedra into the first low-price outlet shopping center in metro San Juan. The change was expected to kick in sometime that next year and would include a 120,000 square foot expansion on the land at the mall's main southern entrance.

In January 2015, Vornado Realty Trust announced it would spin off multiple of its properties into a new company Urban Edge Properties which included the Montehiedra Town Center, this made Urban Edge the shopping centers new owner.

On October 11, 2016, it was reported that Urban Edge Properties, owners of the Montehiedra Mall had announced the conversion of the 600,000 square foot shopping center into the metropolitan area's first outlets, at an investment of $20 million. Using the “Your everyday outlets” slogan, the Outlets at Montehiedra combined outlets as well as regular retail establishments under the same roof. Furthermore, mall owners said in response to the tastes and realities of the local market, the transformation also included the refurbishment of all interior and exterior areas, as well as the construction of a monumental pylon with digital display, and the arrival of new stores and chains. The Outlets at Montehiedra had more than 100 stores, including: Big Kmart, Marshalls, The Home Depot, and outlet stores Nike Factory Store, Puma, Sketchers, Gap Factory Store and Polo Ralph Lauren, among many others, including the early opening of Guess Factory Outlet and Maidenform. Caribbean Cinemas had recently opened new IMAX and 4DX theaters, the first and only one of its kind in Puerto Rico. El Patio Food Court and independent restaurants like Romano's Macaroni Grill, Chili's Bar & Grill and IHOP also had presence at the newly renovated mall.

In the Summer of 2017, it was reported that prior to that past fall, shoppers could easily tell if it was a weekday when visiting the Montehiedra Town Center. The hallways of the at the time 23 year old regional mall were practically empty though there were shoppers inside its anchors, Home Depot, Marshalls and Kmart, and the Caribbean Cinemas multiplex. This no longer became the case after its relaunch that past October as an outlet centre, with a new name: The Outlets at Montehiedra. A weekday visit showed a significant increase in shoppers traffic, with retailers reporting stronger sales. With a gross leasing area of 517,275 square feet, the one-level, enclosed centre was also nearly fully leased, with new outlet store tenants like Gap, Guess, Nike, Polo Ralph Lauren, Puma, and Skechers. The mall, which offered 3,050 parking spaces, had a new slogan, "Your everyday outlets," capitalizing on the fact it was the only outlet mall in the San Juan metropolitan area.

=== 2020s-present ===
On February 3, 2021, it was reported that Kmart would be closing several stores of which the Montehiedra store was included.

On August 23, 2022, it was reported that Urban Edge Properties, owners of The Outlets at Montehiedra, announced that it had signed a lease with Urology Hub, a medical office that would join Ralph's Supermarket and Warehouse to occupy the 80,000 square feet that was once the Kmart store at the mall. These tenants were expected to create 325 new jobs in support of the local economy and would “bring essential grocery and medical services to an underserved metro area,” Urban Edge Properties confirmed. “These new tenants are two terrific resources for the local community and will repurpose this vacant space in a positive way,” said Paul Schiffer, senior vice president for Urban Edge. “Ralph’s will bring high-quality products to the area while Urology Hub will respond to local demand for well-respected doctors and medical services,” he said. Urology Hub would be the largest and most advanced center for urological treatments and procedures in the Caribbean. Ralph's would be the only full-service grocer in the area and was slated to open in 2024. Additionally, Nautica had signed a lease for a 3,000 square foot factory outlet store at the center. This would be Nautica's third store on the island and “has proven to be a very popular brand for local and visiting shoppers,” Urban Edge Properties stated. Currently, a new pad site was also under construction adjacent to the main center, where a 10,305 square foot Walgreens and a 3,695 square foot Global Mattress store would open later that summer in a single building. On the same parcel, Arby's was constructing a 2,400 square foot standalone restaurant with drive-thru service.

On January 11, 2023, it was reported that TJ Maxx would be opening in a space that was subdivided in the former Kmart space at the mall.

On January 29, 2024, it was reported that Tiendas Capri were to close the store that, for more than a decade, had operated at the mall. Along with the defunct Kmart, Marshalls and The Home Depot, Tiendas Capri was one of the main tenants at the mall. It was additionally reported that the shopping mall already has a tenant for the space soon to be formerly occupied by Capri.

On February 6, 2024, it was reported that the Burlington store chain would be opening a store in The Outlets at Montehiedra. Burlington would be occupying the space left by Capri, where a closing liquidation sale was currently being held. At this time the opening date of the store had not been disclosed.

== Gallery ==
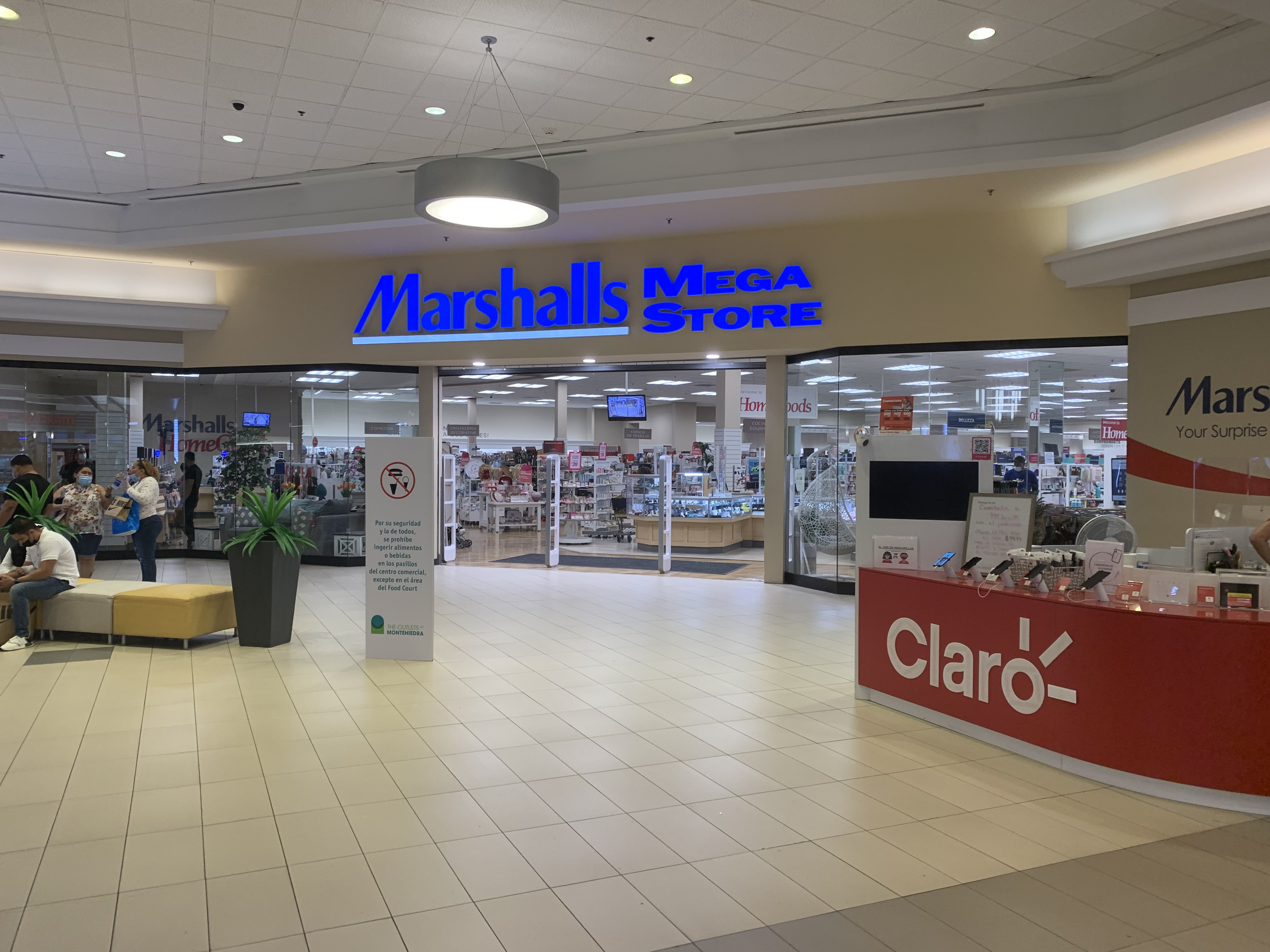
Marshalls MegaStore at the shopping mall

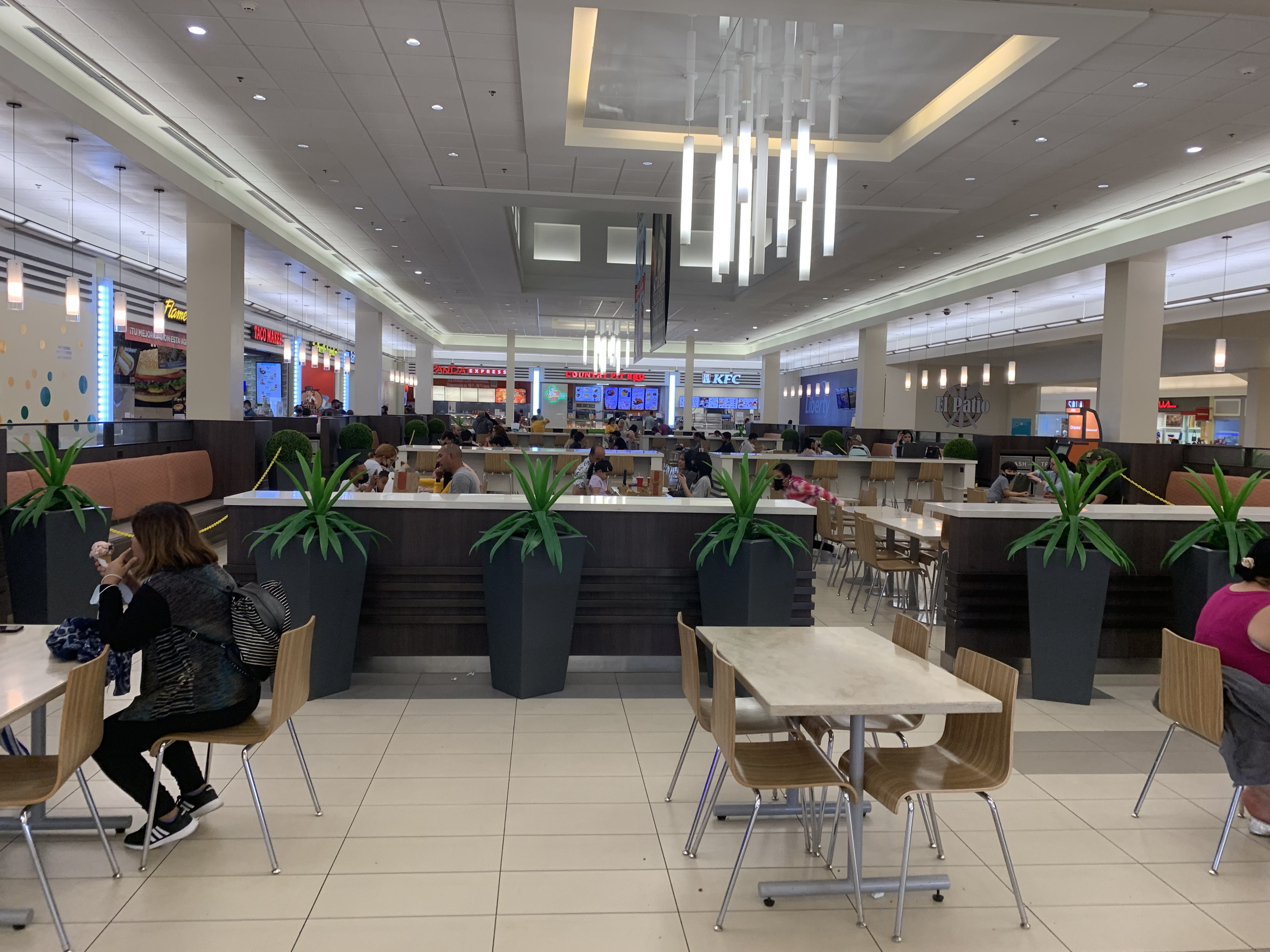
“El Patio” Food Court at the shopping mall
