= New York Department Stores =

Former chain of department stores in Puerto Rico

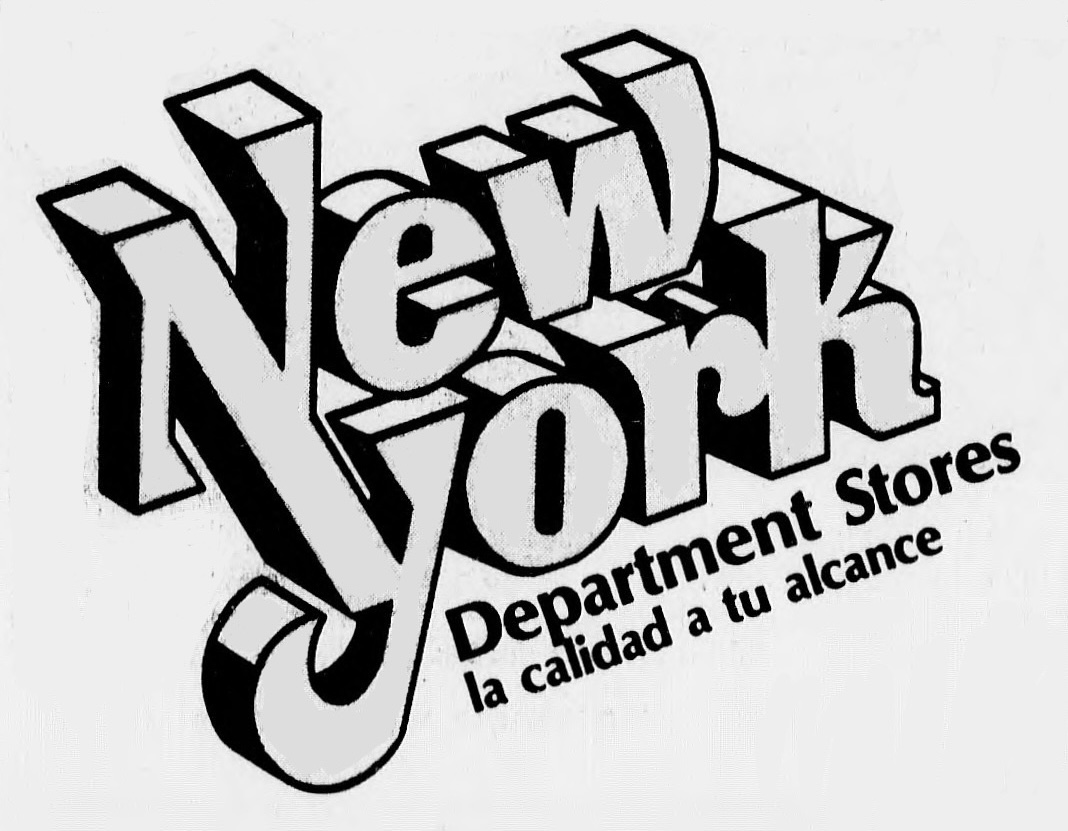
- Logo used from 1981 to 1994
- Company type: Department store
- Industry: Retail
- Founded: 1931; 95 years ago
- Founder: Salomón Kogan
- Defunct: 1994; 32 years ago
- Fate: Acquired by Melville Corporation
- Successor: Marshalls
- Headquarters: Caguas, Puerto Rico
- Number of locations: 10+ (at peak)
- Revenue: $42 million (1987)
- Owner: TJX Companies

New York Department Stores was a chain of department stores operating in Puerto Rico.

== History ==
=== Origins ===
In the 1930s, there were only small merchants in Puerto Rico. The island had not yet begun the industrialization process. People made their purchases in small stores known as "Five and Dime" stores, destined to disappear later on because prices increased and no merchandise could be purchased for five or ten cents anymore. Salomón Kogan came to the Island to try his luck. They came with $1,000 of capital. They intended to settle here and create a ladies' clothing store. They decided to start in Caguas. A few months after being here, Roberto Kogan, Salomón's younger brother, arrived and together they started the business. In 1931, Salomón Kogan arrived in Puerto Rico from New York City. His sister Rosita, who also lived in New York City with her husband, Gregorio Kaufman, and their three children, arrived later. The Kogans were born in Russia but had lived in Cuba for nine years before moving to New York City, where they had language problems, then moving to Puerto Rico. Customers knew the store as "the shop of the jews". Because for them the religion was something striking. At that time there was no Jewish population in Puerto Rico. They received ladies suits from New York City and sold them for $1.00 and $1.95. And within a year of starting, they employed two sisters. They both tended the store while they explored other parts of the Island to expand the business. The next store was established in Guayama. The success obtained in Caguas was the reason to continue reinvesting. Then they opened one in Ponce but it did not have the expected success and so they moved it to Yauco. New York Dress Company was the name of the first store that later on opened in Old San Juan. Doña Felisa Rincón de Gautier, former mayor of San Juan, would also own a small women's dress shop next to the New York Dress Company.

In 1936, they continued to reinvest. The next store was called Broadway Department Stores and was opened that year, also in San Juan. Soon after, and in the same area, they opened the Manhattan Department Stores.

In 1940, they bought from Mr. Manuel Mato Santos a lot with two old houses to build there, at stop 16 of Santurce, a much more sophisticated and complete store than the previous. This was, according to Kogan, the first department store in Puerto Rico. In addition, it was air conditioned (only the Kleins store in the Old San Juan also had air conditioning) and set the pattern for a new schedule in local businesses. It was inaugurated on May 7, 1941. Business hours at that time were different. They closed at 12:00 noon and opened at 2:00 pm. Small businesses had the custom of staying open until eleven past ten at night. Among other reasons, because the public that attended the cinema went shopping afterwards. In addition, there were no laws regulating the hours that employees had to comply with. The employers of that time, in most cases, demanded that the employees work until late at night. But the Kogan were changing the rule. They began to limit the number of hours worked and the other merchants imitated them since the bulk of the customers were attracted by the new department store. Another new element: in this store the public could select the products. The norm in other businesses was for a clerk, behind a counter, to make the sale.

In 1942, World War II broke out. The owners of Kleins, the prestigious clothing store in San Juan, decided to leave Puerto Rico. The premises that Kleins occupied were acquired by the Kogans and they consolidated the three stores in San Juan into one that they called New York Department Stores. They were no longer limited to bringing lots of suits for ladies since they had diversified the merchandise to the maximum. The next store was opened in Río Piedras. Many people believed that the New York Department Stores was American. Roberto Kogan pointed out that they named it in English because at that time New York was the center of fashion. In addition, the name caused a positive impact since everything that came from the United States was attractive.

On April 1, 1947, a new New York Department Stores opened at the stop 17 of Santurce. It was designed by architect Henry Klumb. On July 1, 1947, the first credit cooperative on the Island was incorporated, it was organized in stores for the benefit of employees in these stores. It was the second entity of this nature on the Island.

=== Expanding: 1960s–1980s ===
On February 25, 1960, a new store opened at the “Bayamón Center” shopping center in Bayamón. It featured the first escalators in Puerto Rico, and the interior of the store was designed to offer all kinds of comforts to customers. Specially constructed shelves had been installed to offer a larger display area, while providing the consumer with the ease of selecting items. These shelves were painted in shades of green, blue, yellow, and coral, colors that were all refreshing to behold. One of the back walls of the store was built with special wood brought from the Orient. The fine grain of this panel, as well as its natural color, created a design that could not be duplicated by human hands. The person that was responsible for this striking decoration was one of the most famous interior decorators in the United States, Morris Ketchum Jr., from New York City. Ketchum was chosen to design the windows and the color scheme of the store by its officials, since they wanted to offer the Puerto Rican people the most welcoming surroundings possible. Another feature of the store was its second floor, with all its glass windows. Visitors would have a full view of the entire shopping center from the floor of the New York Department Stores. To complete the beauty of this store, a mosaic mural had been ordered for the exterior wall. And would be revealed once finished. On November 27, 1964, a new store would open at the San Patricio Plaza shopping mall in Guaynabo.

On October 17, 1969, it was reported that studies for a possible merger were undergoing. After two years of talks, the option by which a possible merger could be achieved between the New York Department Stores chain and the Beck Industries, Inc., was a possibility. The news was published by a continental newspaper, and confirmed by Mr. Maximo Crespo, controller at the time of the seven stores that the New York Department Stores operated. It was learned that the purchase price would be the combination of common and convertible preferred shares of Beck Industries. Inc., which had a shoe concession in the New York Department Stores of Puerto Rico. The New York Department Stores had been established in Puerto Rico for 32 years up to that point and operated with a capital of over $12 million.

On October 4, 1972, a new store would open at the Mayagüez Mall in Mayagüez. On April 7, 1981, New York Department Stores would celebrate its 50th anniversary. Projections for this year were told by Alberto Kaufman, nephew of the late Salomón Kogan and then vice president of operations, informed that, among other things, they were already planning to expand the Caguas location. In addition, on April 20 they would inaugurate the remodeling that the Old San Juan branch had undergone.

On February 10, 1983, it was reported that at a cost of $5 million, a new 60,000 square foot shopping center would be built that would primarily be anchored by a New York Department Stores, it would be located on the Jose Mercado avenue of Caguas.

On May 13, 1983, it was reported that New York Department Stores would be reopening in the following month of two of the stores that the Barkers chain had closed on the Island in January of that year. These would be a store in the Yauco shopping center, and another in the shopping center Los Dominicos, in Levittown, 32,250 square feet and 40,000 square feet, respectively. With the reopening of the stores, according to Rafael Pérez, then assistant vice president of finance for the NYDS, these would create around 100 new jobs, in addition to the 700 it already had with another 8 branches and a central warehouse that operated in Puerto Nuevo on the Island. The new stores were purchased at auction in New York City, where Barkers had filed for bankruptcy in January of that year for financial reasons. New York Department Stores paid approximately $500,000 for their equipment and the leasing rights to the shopping centers where they are located. Pérez also said that in the Yauco and Levittown stores, the NYDS would maintain the central cashier system that Barkers used, as well as some additional cashiers in various departments, as was the concept used in its other stores. The manager of the Yauco store would be Luis Muñiz and that of Levittown, Antonio Picón. The chain at the time had stores in San Juan, Caguas, Santurce, Río Piedras, Bayamón, Guaynabo, Arecibo, and Mayagüez.

=== Acquisitions, and dissolution ===
On September 8, 1987, it was announced that To-Fitness of Bay Harbour Island near Miami, a health food company, said it would buy New York Department Stores of Puerto Rico for $8.5 million cash and expand the chain in coming years. To-Fitness said it planned to open To-Fitness boutiques, featuring the company's food products, in each store. To-Fitness marketed a multigrain bread, pasta products and instant yogurt shakes. New York Department Stores operated 10 stores in Puerto Rico at the time, with reported revenues of $42 million for fiscal 1987. To-Fitness also said that Ronald J. DeFusco, former chief executive officer of Spartan-Atlantic Stores, would become chairman of the chain. The acquisition was subject to approval by New York Department Stores shareholders.

On August 2, 1988, investors would buy the New York Department Stores and another chain of stores Seedman's. The New York Department Stores of Puerto Rico Inc., Santurce Realty Inc. and Seedman's of Puerto Rico transferred 100% of their shares to the company, NYTSA Acquisition, effective last July 29. Ronald De Fusco, one of the largest investors in the acquisition, had been appointed to chair the board of directors. De Fusco had more than thirty years of experience in the retail merchandise business. De Fusco said he hoped to give the new members of the management team the opportunity to invest in the new firm. He informed that this team would be primarily composed of current members and executives of the acquired companies. Michael Hess, the former president of Seedman's, would serve as president, and Miguel Delgado, former executive vice president of New York Department Stores, would serve as executive vice president and chief financial officer. It was said that the largest investor in the transaction, other than De Fusco, was Investcorp, an international investment bank with offices in London, New York City and Bahrain, in the Middle East. Investcorp typically acted as a financial partner for corporate and real estate acquisitions.

On May 4, 1994, Melville Corp.'s Marshalls unit agreed to acquire most of Investcorp's New York Department Stores of Puerto Rico Inc., credit-rating companies said the day earlier. Melville was based in Rye, New York. Richard Posner, executive vice president of Credit Exchange in New York, said at the time the agreement in principle between Investcorp and Marshalls, a department store chain, was signed the week before. Posner said the agreement covered all but one of Investcorp's Puerto Rico stores. Terms weren't disclosed. Investcorp owned about 16 midsize department stores in Puerto Rico, said James Rice, a credit analyst at Bernard Sands' Credit Consultancy, who also reported the purchase agreement. Most of the stores bought by the Melville Corp. would be converted into Marshalls stores or closed.

On October 26, 1995, Investcorp went on to mention that the New York Department Stores chain in Puerto Rico did so badly Investcorp gave up hope of recovery and returned the original investment to clients.
