= San Patricio Plaza =

Shopping mall located in Guaynabo, Puerto Rico

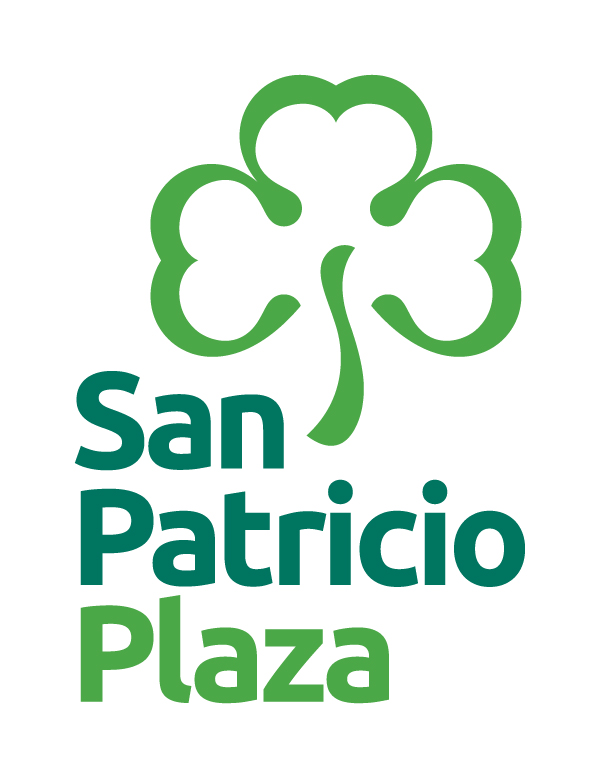

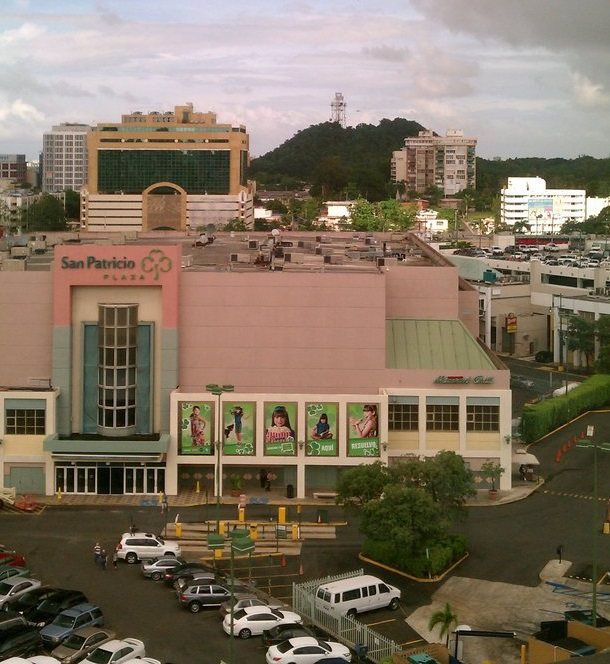
- San Patricio Plaza exterior in 2011

- Location within Puerto Rico
- Alternative names: San Patricio

General information
- Type: Shopping mall
- Location: 100 Ave. San Patricio Guaynabo, Puerto Rico 00968
- Coordinates: 18.4091°N 66.1076°W
- Inaugurated: December 3, 1964
- Owner: Empresas Caparra
- Operator: Adolfo González Santini

Technical details
- Floor count: 3
- Floor area: 640,000 square feet (59,000 m^{2}) (Retail)

Design and construction
- Architect: Summer Scheim
- Developer: Interstate General Corporation

Other information
- Number of stores: 120+
- Number of anchors: 8

Website
- sanpatricio.com

San Patricio Plaza is a 640,000 square feet (59,000 m^{2}) three-level enclosed shopping mall located in Guaynabo, Puerto Rico. The mall is located at the intersection of PR-2, PR-23, and PR-20, and has over 120 stores with its anchors being T.J. Maxx, Capri, Walgreens, PetSmart, Caribbean Cinemas and Office Depot, and Burlington, plus an outdoor shopping area known as "Liberty Square".

== History ==
=== Origins ===
During the Spanish Colonial period, Tomás O'Daly was granted land in the vicinity of Guaynabo and O'Daly developed it into a thriving sugar hacienda. O'Daly and fellow Irishman Miguel Kirwan became business partners in the "Hacienda San Patricio" which they named after the chief patron saint of Ireland, Saint Patrick. The plantation no longer exists. The land on which it was located is now a suburb called San Patricio with a shopping mall, San Patricio Plaza.

=== Development and opening: 1960s ===
On December 14, 1963, while construction started in November 1963, it was officially announced by the president of San Patricio Shopping Center, Inc., James J. Wilson, that arrangements had been finalized for the $3,000,000 financing of the shopping center. Short-term financing for the project was provided by Banco Popular while the State Mutual of America Insurance Company of America was in charge of long-term financing. The shopping center, being located at the corner of San Patricio and F. D. Roosevelt avenues, would be planned to have several establishments. Among those establishments there would be: a Pueblo supermarket, a New York Department Stores; a Kmart discount department store, a Banco Popular, a Thom McAn shoe store, a Walgreens, a Lerner Shops, and a Swiss Chalet restaurant. Pueblo, Kmart, and New York Department Stores, were planned to be the first to open.

On August 14, 1964, the eleventh Pueblo supermarket inaugurated at the shopping center. It was said to be the biggest location in the chain at the time, being 16,000 square feet.

On October 21, 1964, the Kmart inaugurated at the shopping center with a 69,000 square foot store. It was the chains first store out of the continental North America. On November 17, 1964, Lerner Shops inaugurated at the shopping center, this store joined the 337 stores the chain had in Puerto Rico and the United States at the time.

On November 27, 1964, the New York Department Stores inaugurated at the shopping center.

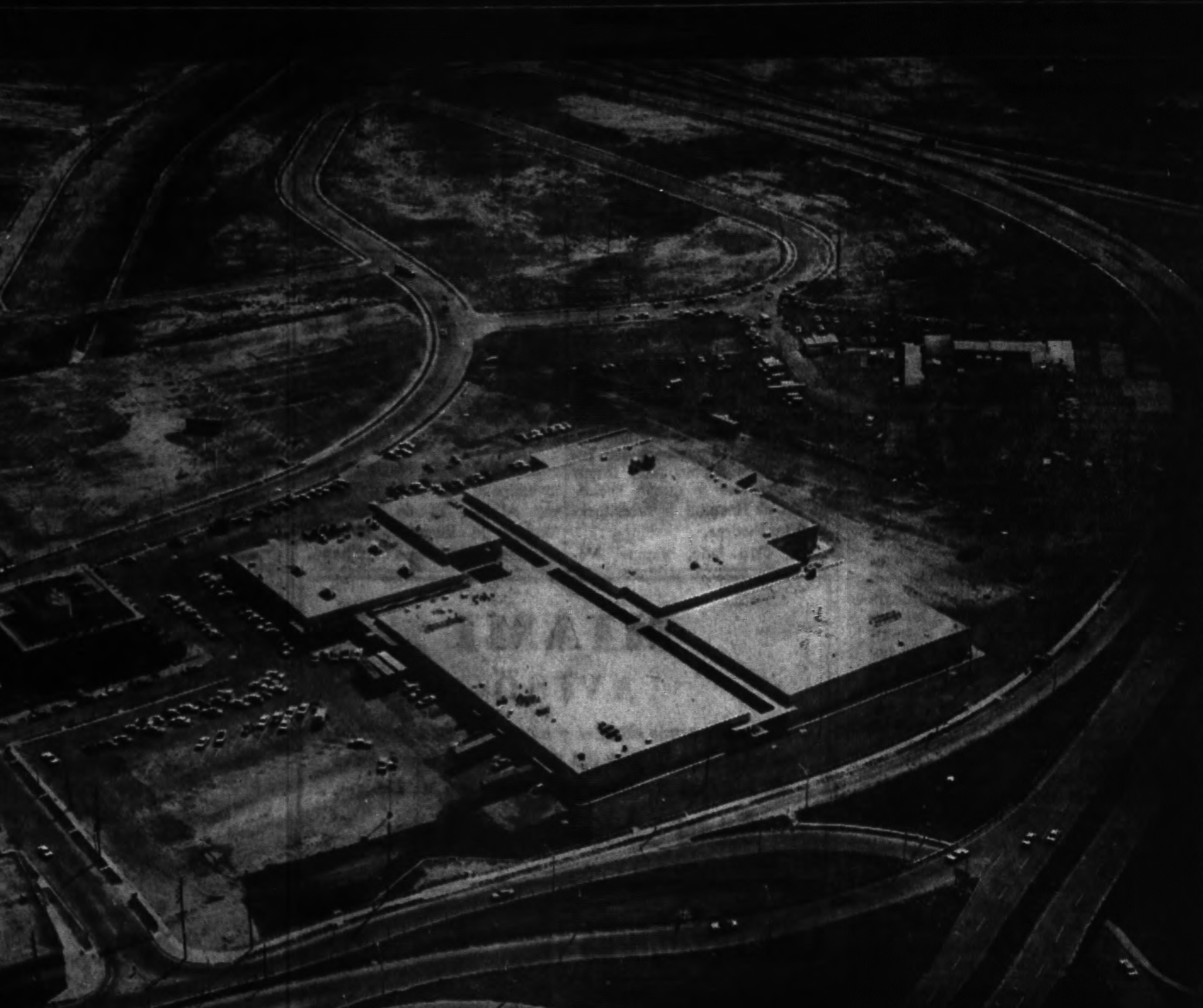
Aerial of the shopping center in 1964

On December 3, 1964, developed by Interstate General Corporation, with Theodore Berenson administrating the shopping center, San Patricio Plaza was officially inaugurated. It opened with 16 establishments, 250 square feet of retail space, and parking for 1,500 vehicles. It was anchored by Kmart, New York Department Stores, Pueblo supermarket, and a Walgreens. Additionally out of those 16 establishments it had places such as Lerner Shops, Giusti, Thom McAn, Clubman, Rudes Decorators, Gordon's Jewelers, Bithorn Travel Agency, Park Avenue Gift Shop, Metalfraft Furniture Store, San Patricio Sports, and others. The cost of the entire shopping center exceeded $8 million, it was designed by architect Summer Scheim. The 20-acre estate where the building was located belonged to the Gonzalez Giusti family, one of whose members, Mr. William Preston Giusti, was vice president of the San Patricio Plaza Association. Walgreens inaugurated their 481 store in the chain, being the third store on the island at the time.

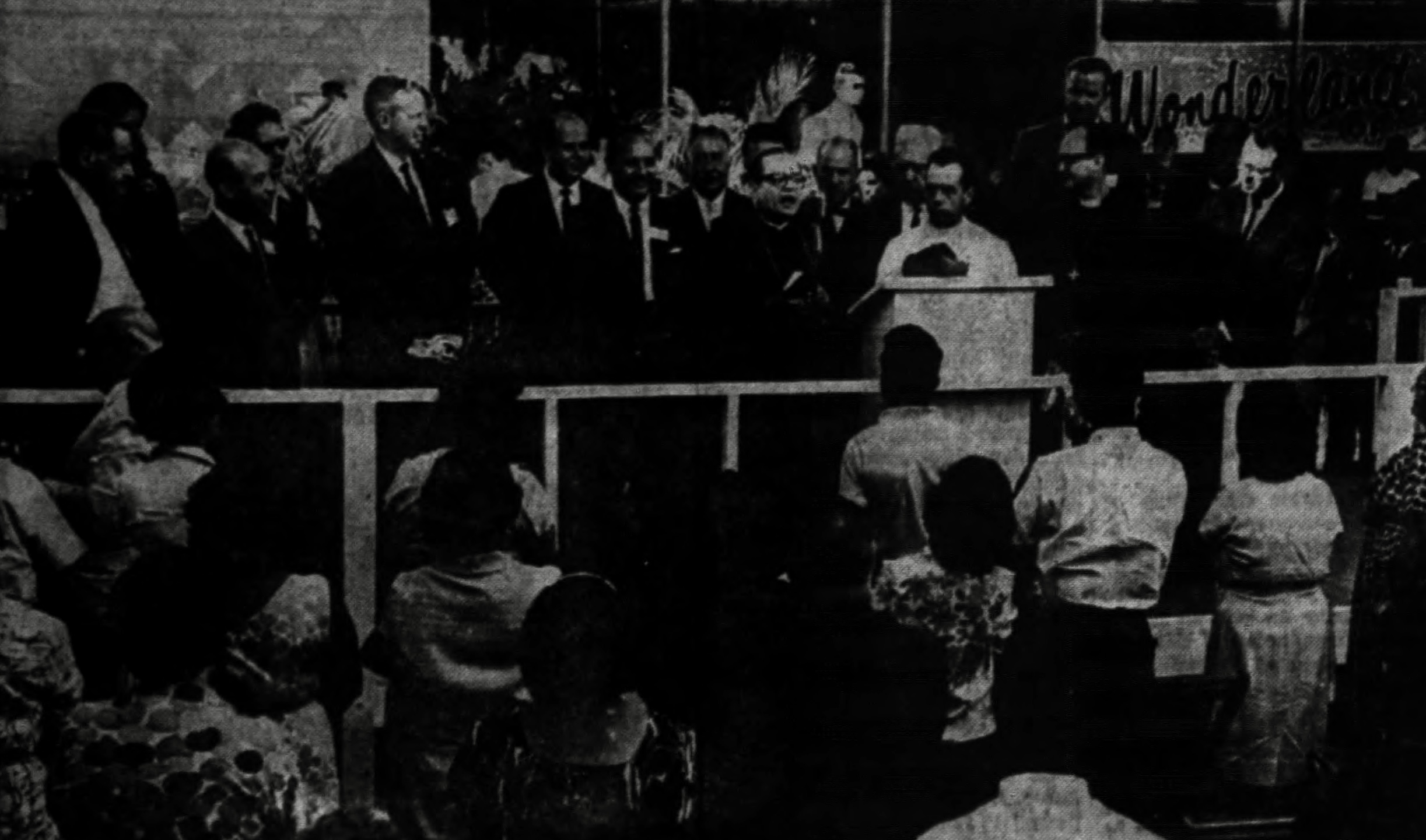
Inauguration day in 1964

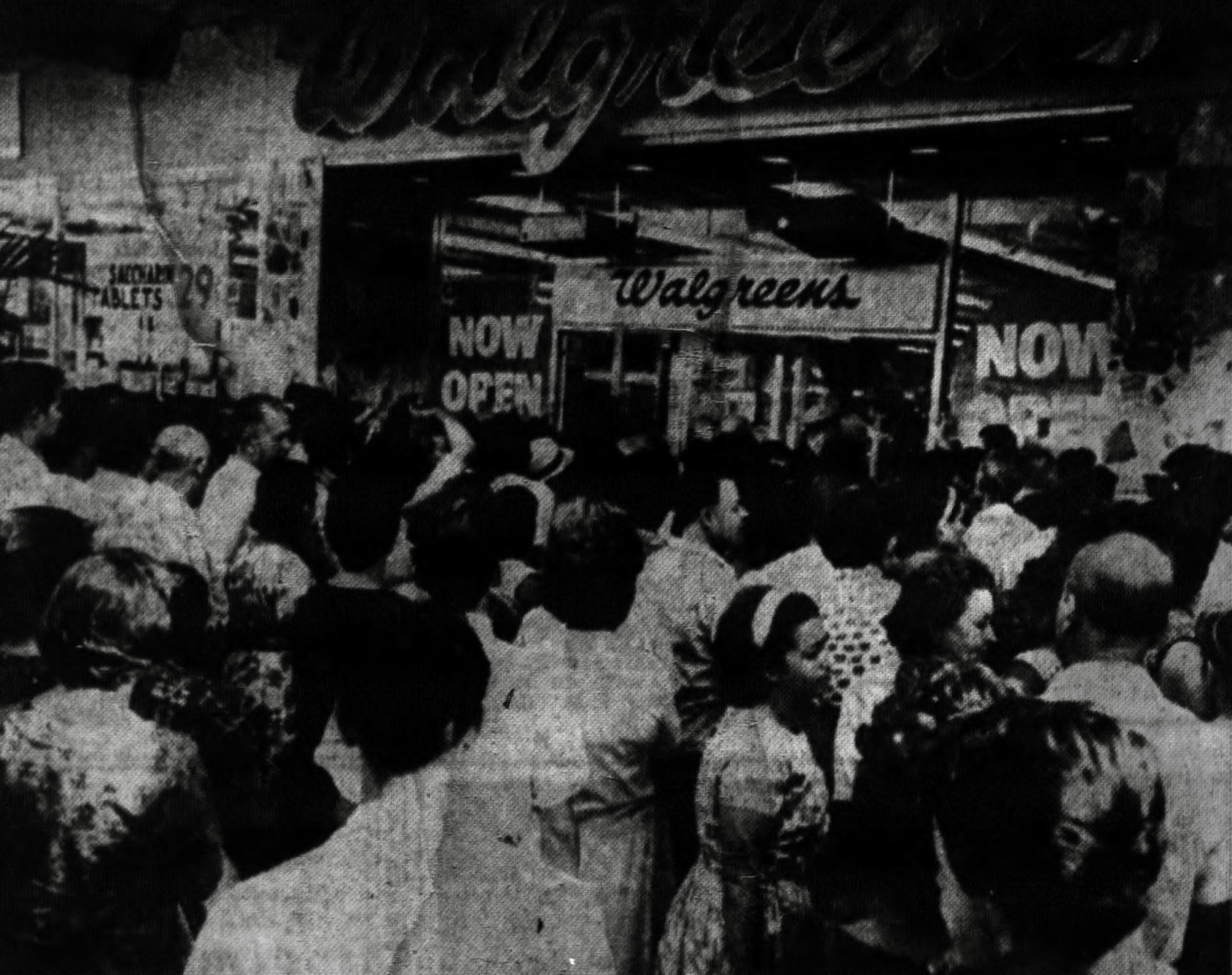
Walgreens at the shopping center on opening day in 1964

During the night of December 31, 1967, a fire consumed the building where Kmart was located and left it completely destroyed. The fire, which caused an estimated loss of $1.5 million, started in some boxes and sheets of cardboard partitioning walls behind the store outside the building. Gordon's Jewelers, which was located next to the Kmart, suffered minor damage and thanks to the prompt intervention of firefighters, the flames did not cross a wall that divided that store from the damaged Kmart building. As a result, after this event, the mall's management decided to enclose the facilities, adding a lower basement level with new stores which would bring the consumer at the time more alternatives to shopping at the center.

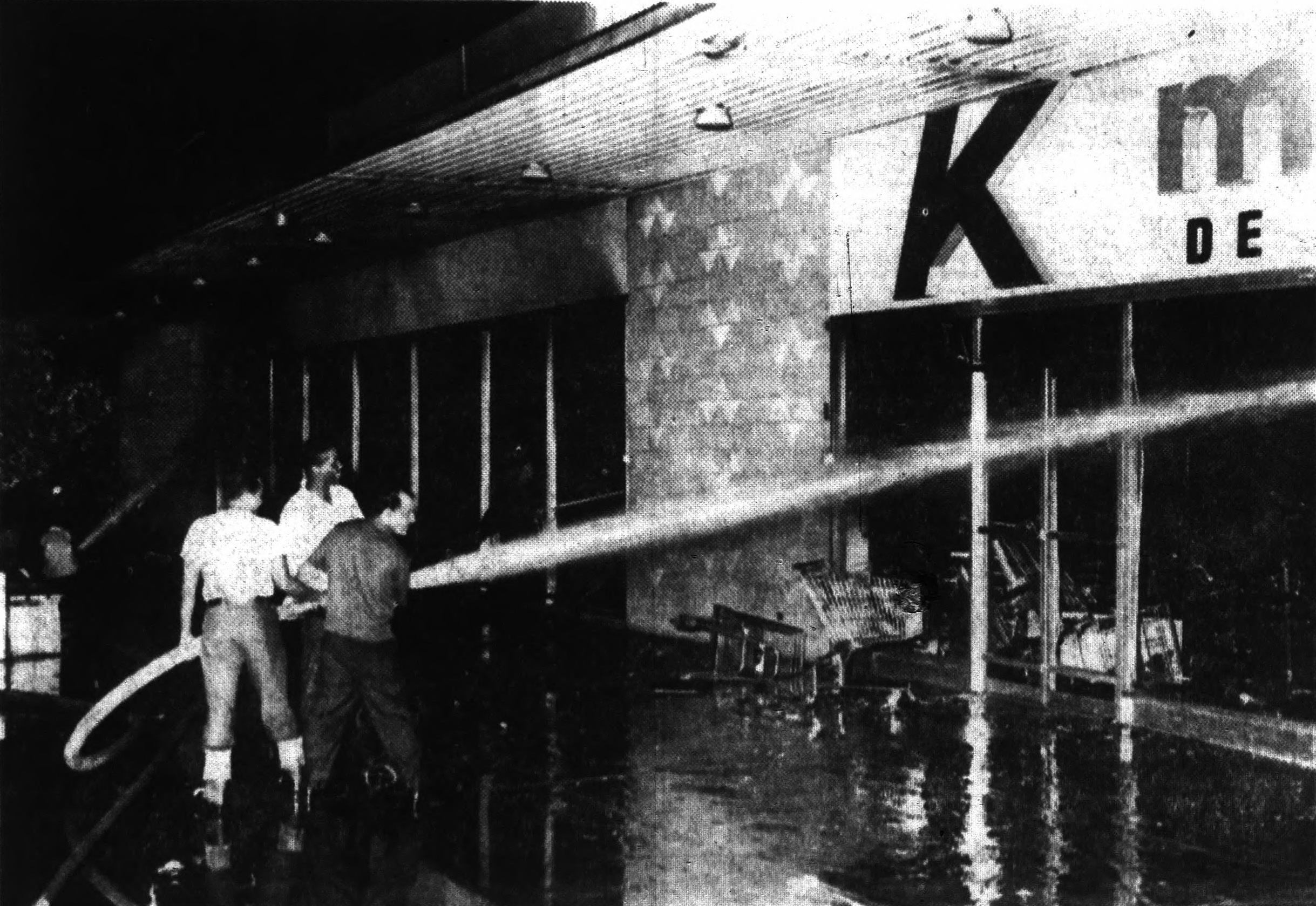
Firefighters combat fire in Kmart building in 1967

On January 30, 1969, Kmart re-inaugurated their store at the mall after the fires that had occurred.

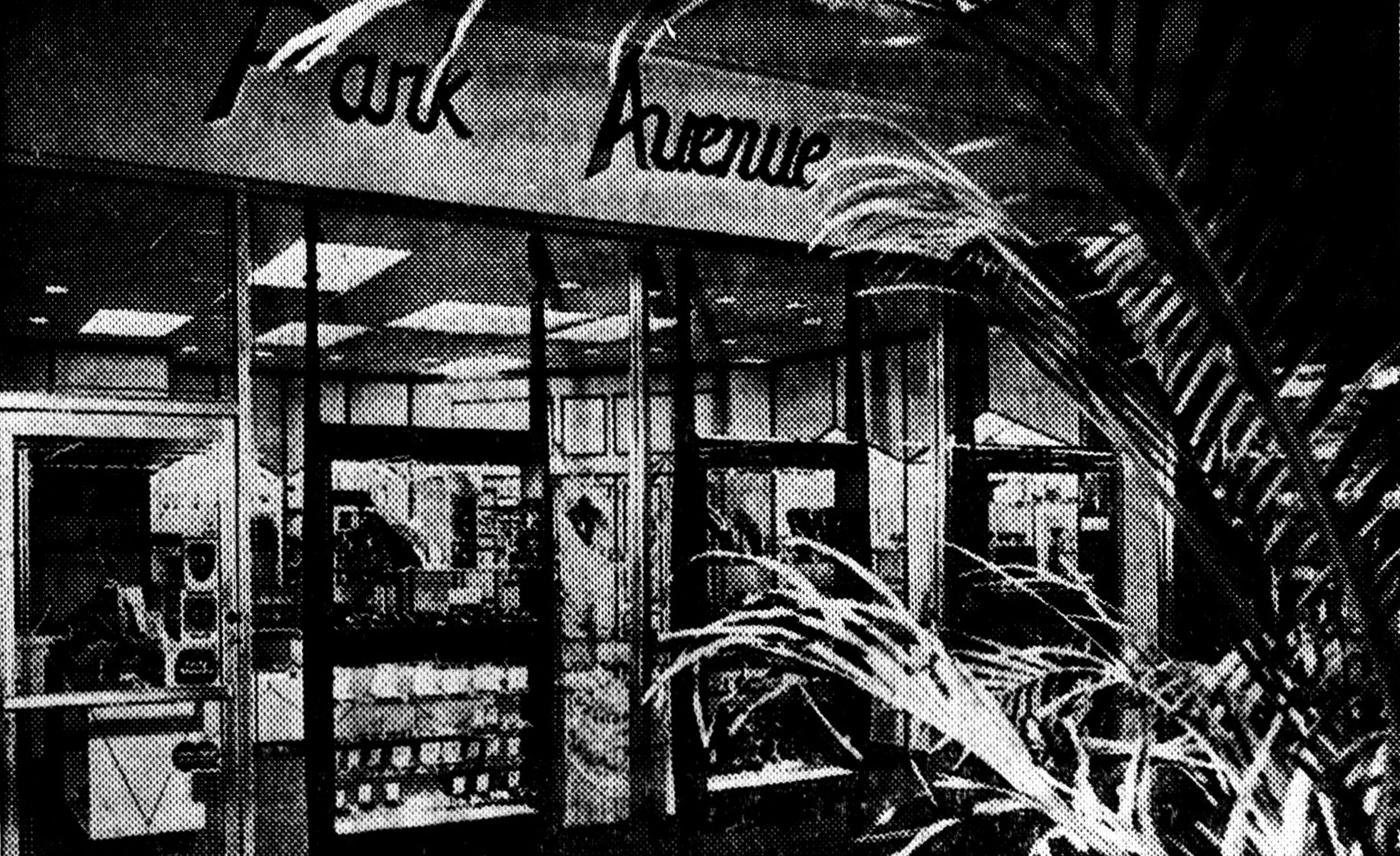
Park Avenue Gift Shop at the shopping center in 1969

=== 1970s-1980s ===
In the 1970s, taking into account the economic conditions of the period in terms of high interest rates and oil costs, Interstate General Corporation decided to sell certain properties, including San Patricio Plaza, which was sold to the González Giusti family.

On June 18, 1977, a Baskin Robbins opened a location on the mall premises next to the then Felicilandia amusement center.

In December 1978, the mall had establishments such as La Cobacha, Caribbean Music, Super Pet Center, Carrousel, Parklane Hosiery, Kress, Amado Beauty Salón, Candyland, and others.

In 1982, the Felicilandia amusement center located on the mall premises would receive $1,000,000 renovations. This same amusement center would later on close in the mid-1990s.

In February 1982, a new 5,400 square foot Almacenes González store would open at the mall.

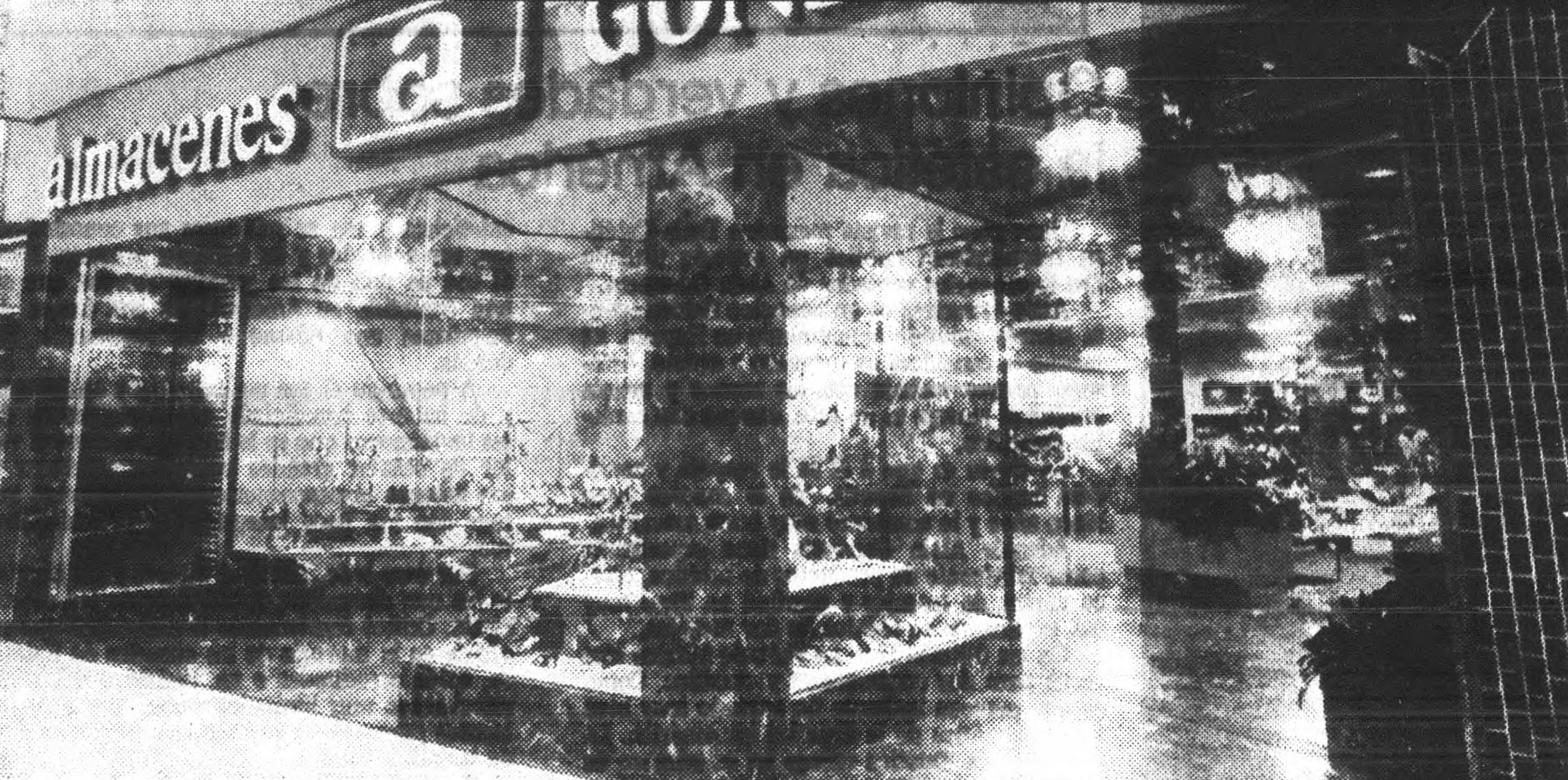
New Almacenes González store in 1982

In 1989, the mall changed its logo for the first time ever, for its 25th anniversary.

=== Galería San Patricio and expansions: 1990s-2000s ===
In early 1991, Galería San Patricio shopping center located on Calle Tabonuco in Guaynabo was built at an investment of 1.1 million dollars. The first phase of this project, consisted of eight stores that had an established clientele, including Sterling House, Kitchen Craft, and Marisol Freyre. The first level was dedicated to shops and the second level provided office spaces. The construction of this shopping center was carried out by remodeling of an old warehouse located behind the famous Felicilandia amusement park and was carried out by the firm Carrerá Arquitectos.

In 1994, the first expansion of Galería San Patricio was completed, this included the two floors of the wing where Uno Chicago Grill was located. With the creation of this new area, and in addition to Uno, came four additional stores, among them the then existing “Bath, Dreams, And…” store.

In 1994, the mall changed its logo once again, the mall was given a $43 million dollar renovation and expansion, which included the addition of a food court which opened the same year. The mall's first St. Patrick's Day celebrations would be held in March 1995, which would introduce the mall’s "Patrick" mascot character. A Caribbean Cinemas location would open in 1997.

In 2000, a LongHorn Steakhouse opened next to the mall. On May 22, 2014, LongHorn Steakhouse relocated to the former Banco Popular space, and the old LongHorn Steakhouse was demolished to make way for an Olive Garden italian restaurant that opened in early 2015.

On June 21, 2001, it was reported that San Patricio Plaza had announced it would begin that January a $60 million third phase of its then ongoing expansion that included a 10.5-story, 150,000 square foot office building, a 25,000 square foot retail strip, and a multilevel parking area for 1,100 vehicles.

In 2003, another expansion phase of Galería San Patricio began, which was completed later that next year which connected the Santander Tower to the San Patricio lobby. In addition to having become a much larger place, this new remodeling added space for the restaurants, shops, jewelry stores and personal care salons, which were located there.

On November 4, 2003, Bed Bath & Beyond inaugurated their store at the mall, the space counting with 41,000 square feet with two levels. This construction had an investment of $7.5 million, of which was to be financed by Banco Popular. It closed in June 2023 after the company declared bankruptcy alongside its other stores.

In 2008, a Circuit City store opened at the mall, being the first of the chain on the island. The store, which opened with 28,000 square feet of space, was located in the area of the east facade, where the new Walgreens pharmacy and a new Ponderosa Steakhouse were located. It later closed in early 2009 after it declared bankruptcy.

=== 2010-present ===
In 2010, it was announced that a TJ Maxx would replace the 28,000 square feet of space left by defunct American retailer Circuit City, which closed in 2009. PetSmart would also open a 24,000 square foot location at the mall this year.

On August 28, 2012, San Patricio Plaza announced a renovation of its Food Court, pedestrian bridge and multifloor parking. By January 2013, the remodelation was completed.

On October 22, 2014, the mall changed its logo again for its 50th anniversary. The entire San Patricio Village was also given a repainting that began in early 2014, replacing the old beige, pink and green color scheme that had been used since 1994, with a new green, yellow and white color scheme. The rest of the mall's 2nd floor, that had remained un remodeled in 2012, was remodeled as well.

In 2014, the mall celebrated its 50th anniversary with an exhibit about its history, and a time capsule which contains items from the mall's first 50 years that will open in 2064. A replica of the mall's original sign was created for the exhibition, which was later moved to the pedestrian bridge in 2016. The exhibit partially closed in 2015. Visitors could still see the history showcase until 2018, when the remains of the exhibit were removed in favor of a larger AT&T location.

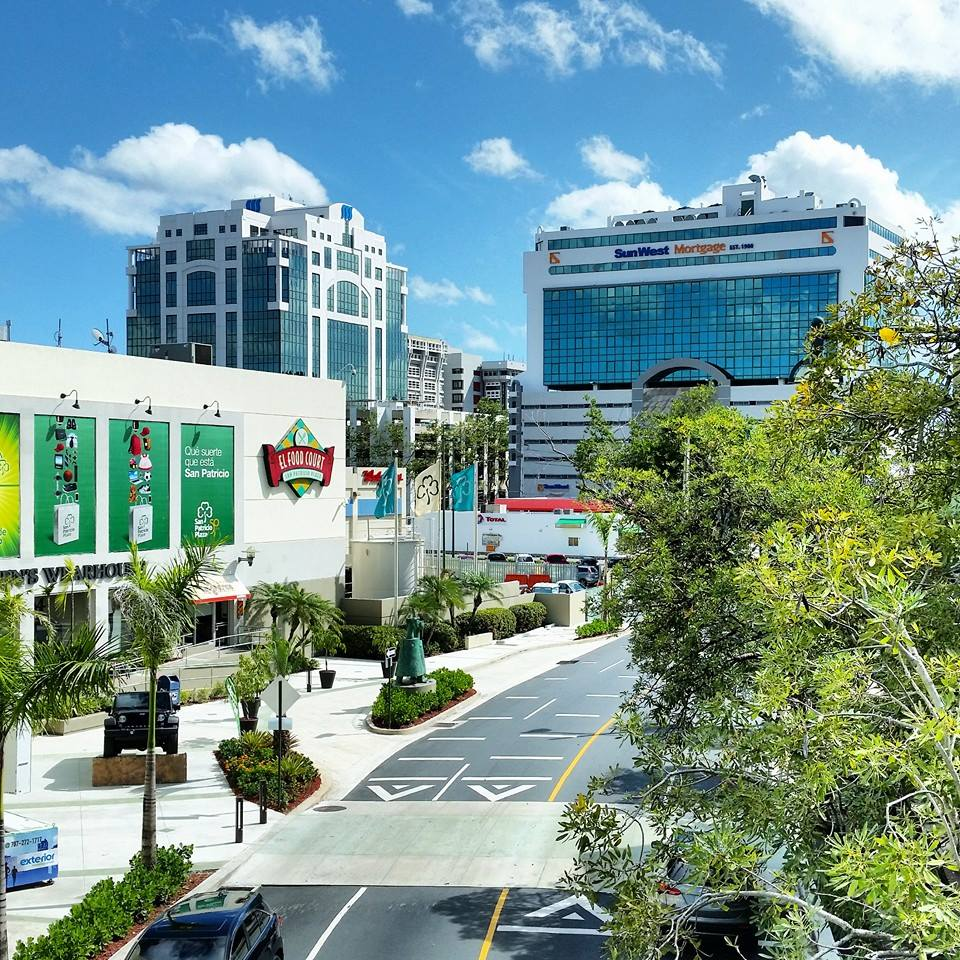
Area around San Patricio Mall in 2015

On January 12, 2017, it was announced that the mall would undergo a $4 million renovation in order to look more modern. It included a new fountain, a new central atrium, new stairs, replacement of flooring and ceiling, exterior improvements, and more. The six ad banners on the fountain area were also removed; and the pink elevator in front of the fountain was demolished. The project officially began on January 17, 2017. The interior was originally expected to be completed in November 2017; however it was completed in March 2018 due to delays caused by Hurricane Maria.

In February 2017, the Santander Tower was converted into the T-Mobile Center, following the closure of the former and T-Mobile moving their main headquarters in Puerto Rico from Hato Rey.

In February 2018, the mall started a campaign promoting their then-newly renovated image. A reinauguration ceremony was held in April 2018. The exterior improvements began in August 2017 and were completed in November 2018.

In July 2018, the Caribbean Cinemas location closed for a renovation. The details about the upcoming location were announced in October. It was originally expected to reopen in December 2018, but it actually opened in February 2019. The new location is a Caribbean Cinemas VIP, with reclining seats and a hall sponsored by Alfa Romeo.

In October 2018 the mall started a project called “Muraleo” that added paintings across the mall. The project has been repeated with different editions in October of every year since then.

The mall's Kmart store closed in February 2019. On December 5, 2019, it was announced that Kmart's former space would be remodeled into an outdoor shopping area called "The Square at San Patricio Plaza", with an investment of $12 million. Construction was expected to begin in early 2020 and would have been completed in late 2020, but due to the COVID-19 pandemic, this project was postponed for a year. Several enhancements would be made to the Village as well.

On October 20, 2020, it was announced that the mall's Village would undergo an enhancement project and would be made in collaboration with Guaynabo's government.

Construction on “The Square” area officially began in September 2021 after being delayed by a year due to the COVID-19 pandemic, following the former Kmart building's demolition which began in May.

In June 2023, it was announced that construction on the Square area was almost completed and the first tenants would open during the coming months. It was also announced that the area would be renamed "Liberty Square" as Liberty Puerto Rico would be sponsoring it. It was also announced on June 5, 2023, that a McDonald's would open in the former site of Pizza Hut by the end of 2023 or Spring of 2024. The new location will be the first one in Puerto Rico to be based upon a new prototype design. It officially opened on April 18, 2024. The chain previously operated in the mall's Food Court from 2006 until the Food Court's remodel in 2012.

On October 22, 2023, it was announced that the former Bed Bath & Beyond location would be replaced by Burlington in the summer of 2024. The store was inaugurated on June 21, 2024.

On February 27, 2025, the mall launched a new ad campaign for its 60th anniversary. As part of the celebration, an exhibition showcasing photos and items of the mall across its history will be added, which will remain operational until late 2025.

== Felicilandia ==
Opened in 1972, Felicilandia, an amusement park, was located on the grounds of the San Patricio Plaza for about two decades.

In 1991, a storage building behind Felicilandia was bought by the owners of San Patricio Plaza and converted into another part of the mall, a two-story building right by the amusement park which added eight stores and offices to the mall.

Felicilandia was a year-round attraction which remained open for two decades. When it closed in the mid-1990s, some of the amusement rides were relocated for use elsewhere.

An exhibit at the San Patricio Plaza created in 2014 and closed in 2018 included pictures and a little history of when Felicilandia was there. Located in Guaynabo, a highly populated municipality, Felicilandia is a place steeped in nostalgia for some residents of Puerto Rico.

The park had a ferris wheel, bumper cars, mini-planes, a main roller coaster, a children's roller coaster, a children's ride where kids could drive cars up and down a play mountain, with a bridge included.

== See also ==
- Plaza Las Americas
- Plaza del Sol
