= CineVista Theatres =

Former movie theater chain in Puerto Rico

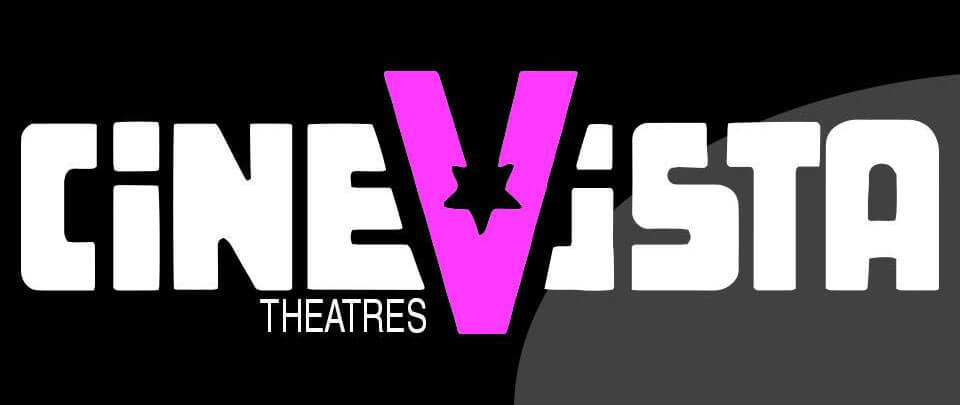
- Company type: Theatre chain
- Founded: 1990s
- Defunct: 2009; 17 years ago
- Fate: Bankruptcy
- Number of locations: 7 (at peak) (2001)
- Number of employees: 138 (2001)
- Parent: CV Entertainment Inc.

CineVista Theatres was a movie theatre chain in Puerto Rico founded in the 1990s. After CineVista went bankrupt and started closing its theatres, Caribbean Cinemas became the only theatre chain in Puerto Rico.

== History ==
In 1994, CineVista Theatres would be acquired by Reading International Inc.

In December 1999, at a cost of $8,000,000 a new CineVista Theatres complex of Twelve Plex Theaters at the Plaza Carolina in Carolina, which contained stadium-style seats would be built. It would officially open in the year 2000.

In 2000, was the opening by Caribbean Cinemas of a state-of-the-art multiplex cinema in the Plaza Las Américas, the largest shopping center in Puerto Rico. Prior to the opening of this cinema, CineVista's cinema complex at the Plaza Las Américas was Reading's top grossing cinema in Puerto Rico. Reading believed that the entering into of the lease with respect to this cinema by the owner of the Plaza Las Américas and Caribbean Cinemas was in violation of agreements reached between CineVista and the owner of the Plaza, and was an exercise of monopoly power by the Plaza and Caribbean Cinemas.

In 2001, Reading International Inc., had determined to focus its future cinema exhibition activities on Australia, New Zealand and the United States. This decision was made in large part due to the competitive situation in Puerto Rico, where Caribbean Cinemas had acquired a greater than 82% market share and continued to build in an already overbuilt cinema market. While Reading had sought relief in the Puerto Rican courts, alleging violation of applicable antitrust laws, it was unlikely, given the pace at the time of antitrust litigation in Puerto Rico, that assistance would be forthcoming within a time frame that would justify continued investment in Puerto Rico by Reading. Accordingly, Reading intended to exit the Puerto Rican market, when feasible. In 1999, Reading wrote down its investment in Puerto Rico from approximately $34,000,000 to approximately $3,000,000. While Reading was currently in preliminary discussions with a potential acquirer concerning the potential sale of substantial portions of its CineVista circuit, no assurances would be given that those discussions would result in a transaction. Reading intends, even if it is successful in disposing of its Puerto Rico assets, to continue its antitrust litigation in an attempt to recoup some portion of its losses in Puerto Rico.

In 2001, CineVista operated 52 screens in seven leased facilities in Puerto Rico. In Puerto Rico, Reading's concentration had been on multiplex cinemas located on leasehold properties, and the exhibition of conventional film product. All of CineVista's theaters were modern multi-screen facilities. During some last six years at the time, Puerto Rico had undergone significant retail shopping center development. During this period, the number of multiplex theaters had increased substantially. The company's principal competitor, Caribbean Cinemas, a privately owned company, had opened 11 complexes adding approximately 103 screens since the beginning of 1996, and was expected to continue to open theaters competitive with those of CineVista. These new screens have adversely affected the company's current operations. Since 1994, this competitor's share of the Puerto Rico box office had increased from 48% to 82%. Reading believed that the Puerto Rico market was over-built, and that there would be few, if any, opportunities in the near to medium term that would be attractive to Reading. CineVista had approximately 138 employees in Puerto Rico at the time.

On June 10, 2004, it was reported that the former CineVista Theatres located at El Mercado Plaza in Naranjito, would reopen as the three screen Centro Cinema move theater. Centro Cinema occupied 8,000 of the mall's 140,000 square feet. CineVista would manage the movie theater, and like other CineVista operated movie theaters at the time, Centro Cinema would present Casino Movie Magazine (CMM). This would bring the number of movie theaters showing CMM to 52.

On June 23, 2005, it was reported that local investment group CV Acquisitions Corp. had purchased the six-theater CineVista chain for $2.1 million from Reading International Inc. of Los Angeles. Reading's June 16 announcement of the sale ended several years of negotiations to shed the movie theaters and leave Puerto Rico. The buying group was led by real-estate developer Rafael Nin, a former president of Pepsi-Cola P.R. Bottling Co., credited with shepherding the bottler out of a financial scandal, and investment banker & broker Ramón Cantero Frau, a former secretary of the Economic Development & Commerce Department and former Government Development Bank president. Other investors included Larry Odell, partner in the law firm Martínez, Odell & Calabria, and Eduardo Llauger, vice president & general manager of CineVista, who would continue as the operations partner of the investment group. With 48 screens, CineVista was the little guy in the island's movie exhibition market, competing with more than 200 screens owned at the time by the dominant player, Caribbean Cinemas. Reading International, which had been trying to sell the movie theaters for several years, was convinced CineVista wasn't able to make a profit in the local market. However, the new investors were positive the business would flourish. "We believe we will be able to grow and be profitable”, said Nin. "We are a group of investors who know the Puerto Rico economy, know consumer behavior, and believe there could be two different entities working in the same market," said Nin, who presided the group. CV Acquisition planned to remodel and expand the CineVista theaters at Plaza Las Américas, a venue that had proven profitable for retail businesses, from fast food restaurants to cinema theaters. In addition to expanding the six theaters purchased, the group was looking to develop movie theaters in municipalities where they didn't have theaters.

On September 15, 2005, it would be reported that the coming attractions presented at the CineVista Theatres, in Plaza Las Américas, offered a new concept in leisure for Puerto Rico. The following spring, CV Entertainment would be set to premiere Galaxy Lanes, a modern multimedia entertainment center on the third floor of Plaza Las Américas, replacing the original eight movie screens and the movie theater concept with bowling, dining, dancing, and more, in an attractive and safe environment. "It's entertainment in a new dimension," said investor Rafael Nin, president of CV Entertainment. Financing the $6 million investment was Banco Popular de Puerto Rico, a group of investment bankers from UBS de Puerto Rico, and venture capital unit Miradero Capital. The centerpiece would be 32 bowling allies with plush sofas and sixteen 12 square foot mega screens spanning every two alleys. A 20 square foot mega screen, mainly for sports events and short subjects, would grace the mezzanine and there would be plasma screens everywhere, as well as wireless Internet connection in an expansive lounge area. In addition to bowling, there would be billiard tables, two restaurants, grill, an informal eatery and two bars, including a sports bar. Also featured were a dance floor, a DJ box, two glass enclosed VIP boxes for parties and other celebrations, and a studio to transmit radio and TV programs. While full-length feature movies weren't on the program, live feeds of concerts were. The last showing of movies was on September 7, at around 9 p.m. The next day, the seats in theater 7 were being removed. "Thirteen years ago, I built these theaters,“ said Eduardo Llauger, general manager, who continued his interest as operations partner of the investment group. "Now I'm demolishing them." The media center woulf take up more than the eight movie theaters' 40,000 square foot space, expanding the area with the addition of a mezzanine. Carrera Arquitecto designed the entertainment center, and its construction was in the hands of Hambleton Group Companies Inc. The Plaza Las Américas venue would become the company flagship, and the remaining five properties would continue the core business. These theaters also would be remodeled with a $20 million investment. Plaza Las Américas, the largest retail shopping mall in the Caribbean, had proven profitable for retail businesses, from fast food restaurants to cinema theaters. CV Entertainment Group (then CV Acquisitions Corp.) acquired the Cine Vista chain for $2.1 million in June of that year after several years of negotiations with Reading International Inc. of Los Angeles. Besides the Plaza Las Américas movie theaters, the group acquired the screens at Plaza Carolina; Plaza del Norte, Hatillo; Mayagüez Mall; and Plaza Palma Real, Humacao.

On January 26, 2006, it was reported that CineVista recently had been reborn as CV Entertainment Group, where CV could just as easily stand for Change in Vision, caps intended. And if CV's vice president for Marketing & Development Osvaldo A. González was correct, nothing less than a renaissance of the movie exhibitor industry on the island was afoot. While CV's former multiplex at Plaza Las Américas showed its last movie around 9 p.m. on Sept. 7, 2005 and the next day, the seats in theater 7 were being removed, González emphasized the company had no intention of leaving the movie theater business. "On the contrary," he said, before outlining his company's vision in broad, Technicolor brushstrokes. "We want to make the cinema a destination point for families on the island. More than just showing a movie, we want to create an experience. There are certain details I can't go into at the moment because they are part of the novelty and surprise, but I can tell you we will be launching a very different concept." González maintained CV had a series of projects lined up to "improve, update, and reinvigorate" the company's five remaining multiplexes, starting with the reopening of the company's cinemas at the Mayagüez Town Center. "Mayagüez should be ready in April or May. Since it's a construction project, giving an exact date can be difficult, but that's what we are shooting for." CV's four other multiplexes, he added, "Are also in the process of being renovated" and that all would be completed "this year." Moreover, González, revealed the company was planning additional locations, though remaining tight lipped about the details. "These are not words in thin air, there are concrete plans. I'II leave it at that." González volunteered far more information about CV's plans for its Plaza Las Américas location, which was in the process of undergoing a different kind of transformation. As its movie theaters were being torn down, a completely new entertainment concept in Puerto Rico began to take shape in their place. "When we first acquired the business, we decided [the Plaza location] would be the ideal place for us to launch Galaxy Lanes," González asserted, while adding that part of CV's strategic vision from the beginning had been to expand beyond its core, movie theater business. "Galaxy Lanes is an entertainment center that offers a variety of entertainment options where you can go bowling, enjoy yourself at one of our two restaurants, and even go dancing. We also have pool tables, two bars, and wireless Internet access, but its signature, what will set it apart from any other entertainment venue in Puerto Rico, is that it will probably be the most advanced audiovisual facility on the island." The visual centerpiece of Galaxy Lanes would be its 10 large video screens located along its back wall, which together combined to create a single image nearly 200 feet in length. González added the facility was on track for a May grand opening. CV was investing $10 million on Galaxy Lanes alone, with another $20 million for its theater renovation projects. Asked whether there were plans to build additional facilities like Galaxy Lanes, González responded that while "not given to speculation," the company has "looked at the possibility of opening as many as three or four more at different locations throughout the island."

On January 25, 2007, it would be reported that CV Entertainment Group had shut down its 19,982 square foot, six screen multiplex in Hatillo's Plaza del Norte shopping mall, one of several high-profile tenants that had recently exited or were about to leave the shopping mall owned by stateside Real Estate Investment Trust (REIT) and Developers Diversified Realty (DDR).

On August 23, 2007, it was reported that a seven-theater CineVista complex would be opening at a new shopping mall development named Plaza 23 in Santurce. The project was expected to begin construction in November of that year.

On January 17, 2008, it would be reported that the CineVista Theatres located at the Plaza Carolina in Carolina would close.

On June 3, 2008, it would be reported that owners of the CineVista Theatres, CV Entertainment Inc. had filed for Chapter 11 bankruptcy. By this point they had already closed the CineVista Theatres location at the Plaza Carolina.

On October 23, 2008, it was reported that the CineVista Theatres located at the Mayagüez Town Center in Mayagüez had closed, and would soon be reopened under new administration.

== Locations ==
- Plaza Las Americas (closed on September 7, 2005, later on reopened as Galaxy Lanes
- Plaza Carolina (closed on January 18, 2008, but currently available as Caribbean Cinemas)
- Mayaguez Mall (closed on November 10, 2008)
- Mayaguez Town Center (closed on November 10, 2008, currently owned by El Cine.)
- El Señorial Mall (closed on May 30, 2003)
- Plaza Palma Real (closed September 1, 2007)
- Plaza del Norte (closed on April 27, 2007. Now Caribbean Cinemas.)
- Naranjito (closed in 2001, reopened in 2004 but owned by Naranjito Centro Cinemas)
