= Shops at Caguas =

Shopping mall located in Caguas, Puerto Rico

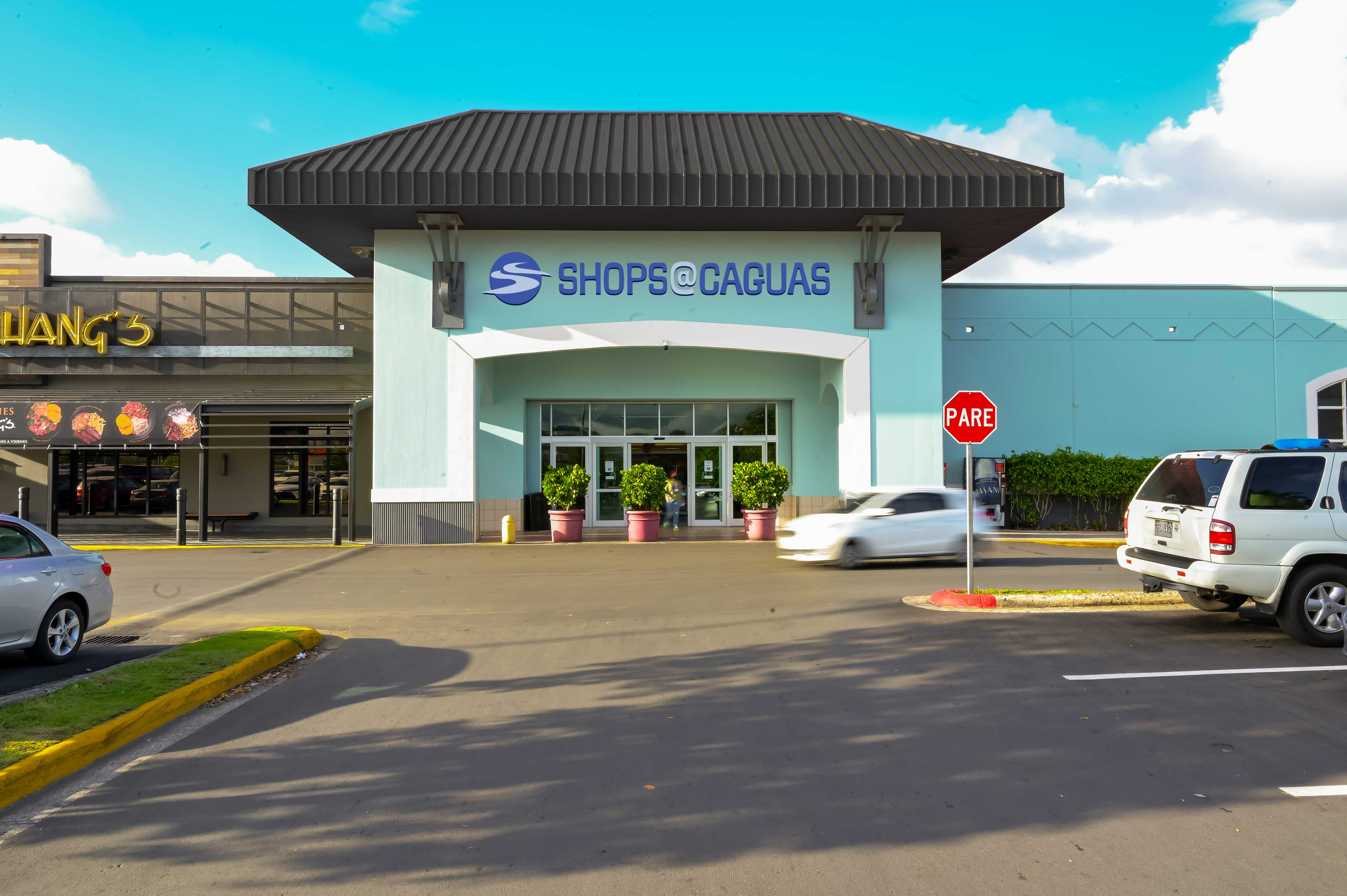
- Main entrance (November 2023)
- Location: Caguas, Puerto Rico
- Coordinates: 18.23694°N 66.03997°W
- Address: 400 Betances Ave
- Opened: 4 December 1997
- Developer: Manley Berenson, Yebba Realty Ventures
- Owner: Urban Edge Properties
- Num. of stores: 97
- Num. of anchor tenants: 3
- Floor area: 500,000 sq ft (46,000 m^{2})
- Floors: 1 (possibly 2 in the future Ross Stores)
- Parking: +3,000
- Website: www.lascatalinasmall.com

Shops at Caguas (stylized as Shops@Caguas), formerly known as Las Catalinas Mall until 2023, is an enclosed shopping mall located in Caguas, Puerto Rico. The mall opened in 1997, and is currently anchored by a Sector Sixty6 entertainment center which takes up the space of a previous Big Kmart, Old Navy as a junior anchor store, and a Ross Dress for Less which is scheduled to open in 2025 in the former Sears store at the mall which closed their doors in February 2021, The Shops at Caguas are home to the first "large premium format" movie theater in Puerto Rico (and second in the Caribbean region, at the time of its opening), currently owned and managed by Caribbean Cinemas.

== History ==
=== Origins ===
The mall's previous name of Las Catalinas is an homage to the 19th century, when the current shopping center property was the site of a sugarcane plantation, Hacienda Santa Catalina. In addition to sugar production, and left with copious amounts of leftover post-processing sugarcane, Hacienda Santa Catalina also produced rum, as well as cultivated many fruits.

=== 1990s-2000s ===
In April 1997, Vornado Realty Trust announced that it would acquire Kmart's 50% interest in the then-Caguas Centrum, as the center was previously known, which was under construction. The name of the mall would then be changed to Las Catalinas.

On December 4, 1997, after development by Manley Berenson and Yebba Realty Ventures, Las Catalinas Mall officially opened with 80 stores and 3,000 parking spaces. It was anchored at the time by a Kmart Super Center and a Sears department store. It also featured a food court, “El Trapiche.” The mall was built with the purpose to serve the surrounding communities, but its variety of businesses lead it to become a regionally popular destination.

On November 4, 1998, Vornado Realty Trust bought Kmart's 50% interest in the mall, forming a joint ownership between Vornado and Yebba Realty Ventures. In addition, Vornado acquired 75% and Yebba Realty Ventures acquired 25% of Kmart's anchor store. Vornado's total purchase price was about $38 million.

By the year 2000, the successful mall had over 100 tenants, including many popular businesses of American origin, such as 5-7-9, Afterthoughts, Claire's Boutique, Electronics Boutique, Footaction, Hallmark, KB Toys, Payless ShoeSource, RadioShack, Zales, and many others. The food court and restaurant options included El Mesón, Hot Potato, Howard Johnson's, KFC, Quiznos, Taco Bell, Wetzel's Pretzels, and more.

Also in the early 2000s, additional land was developed to open The Home Depot home improvement store and a Caribbean Cinemas movie theater. These additions complimented the mall's variety, and would help to enhance the status of Las Catalinas as a top regional shopping destination.

In December 2001, Amigo Supermarkets announced that they would be opening a location at the mall by summer 2002.

On September 23, 2002, Vornado Realty Trust increased its interest in Las Catalinas to 100% by acquiring the other 50% of the mall from Yebba Realty Ventures and the 25% from the Kmart anchor store. The purchase price was approximately $48 million.

=== 2010s-present ===
In 2010, an Adidas store and an iShop opened stores in the mall.

In April 2012, it was announced that Best Buy, which was located on the premises of the mall, would be closing by mid-May 2012.

In January 2015, Vornado Realty Trust announced they would subsume some of their properties, including Las Catalinas, into a new company, Urban Edge Properties.

In July 2015, Sears Holdings reconfigured 235 of their properties, including the store at Las Catalinas, into Seritage Growth Properties.

In July 2015, a 13,773²-foot Forever 21 clothing store opened at the mall, the chain's fifth store on the island, at the time.

On September 20, 2017, the mall was temporarily closed due to the impact of Hurricane Maria across Puerto Rico.

On November 8, 2018, Sears Holdings announced that Kmart would be closing as part of a company-wide plan to shut down around 40 stores in the U.S. and P.R. The store officially closed on January 31, 2019.

On December 28, 2020, it was announced that Sears would also be closing in February 2021 as part of a company-wide plan to close 23 stores nationwide, leaving the mall temporarily with no anchor tenants.

In February 2021, it was announced that a 22,000²-foot Coast Guard Exchange (CGX) would be opening in the former Office Depot space at the mall, scheduled to open by summer of that year.

In August 2021, it was announced that a Sector Sixty6 Entertainment Center and a Golden Corral restaurant would replace the former Kmart store. They were expected to open by 2022, but were delayed until summer 2023.

In August 2022, a 1,916²-foot Tous store opened at the mall.

In June 2023, it was announced that both a 2,109²-foot Hot Topic store, and a 5,520²-foot Puma store would be coming to the mall. Hot Topic would open that month, being the chains 7th store on the island.

On October 25, 2023, Sector Sixty6, an entertainment center, taking up the space of the former Kmart at the mall, would officially debut at a cost of $22 million.

On November 9, 2023, it was announced by Urban Edge Properties (owners of Las Catalinas Mall) that, after 26 years, the center would be changing its name to the Shops@Caguas (the Shops at Caguas).

In December 2023, the Amigo Supermarkets location at the mall suffered a small fire. No one was injured.

On May 2, 2024, it was reported that Ross Dress for Less would officially be opening at the mall, taking over the former space of the Sears store which sat vacant since 2021. Plans for Ross to officially debut on the island are scheduled for the beginning of 2025.

On February 14, 2025, it was reported that Forever 21 had begun the permanent closure of all its stores in Puerto Rico starting the liquidation process for all of the 4 stores on the island of which included the Shops at Caguas store.

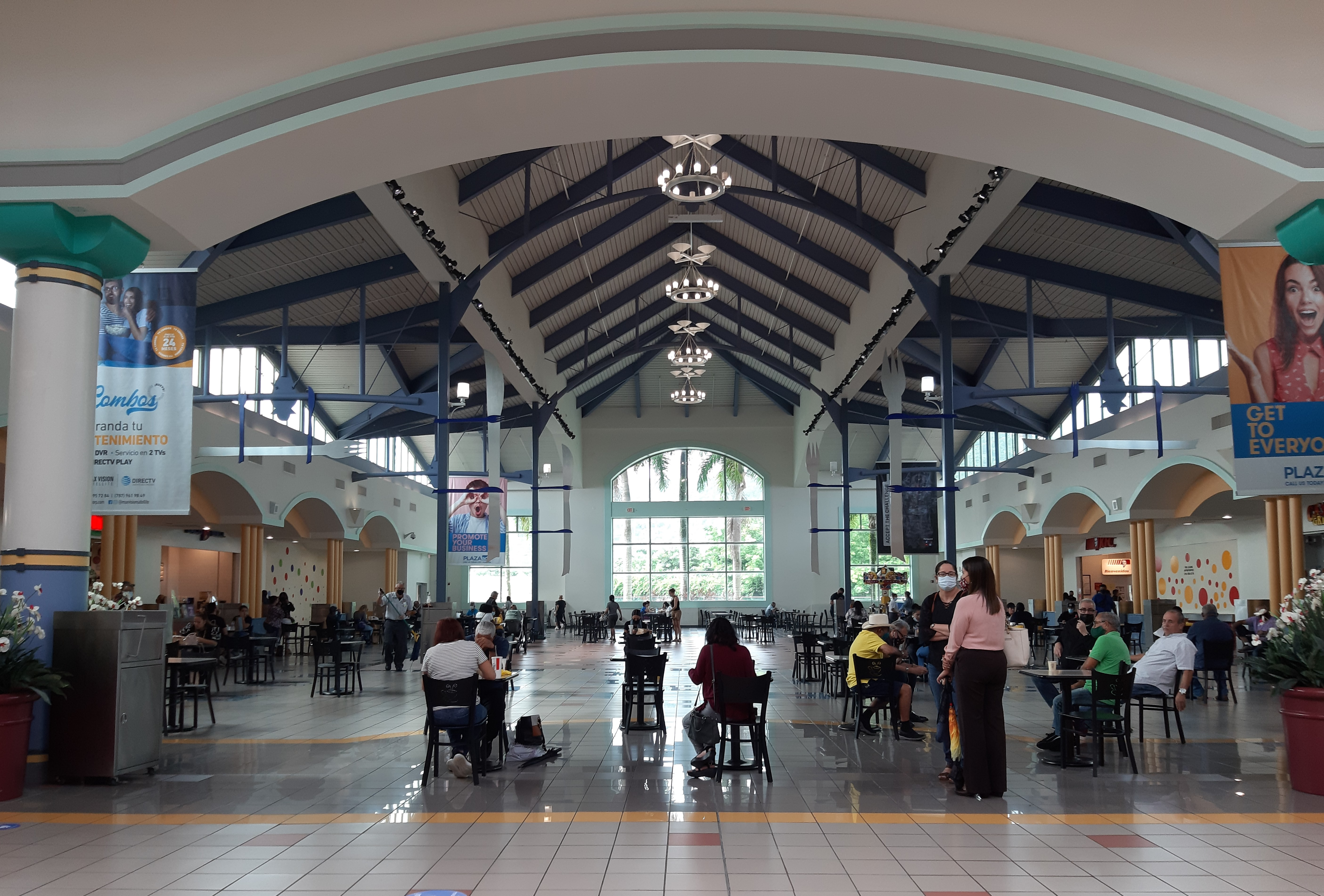
El Trapiche Food Court
