= Plaza del Norte =

Shopping mall located in Hatillo, Puerto Rico

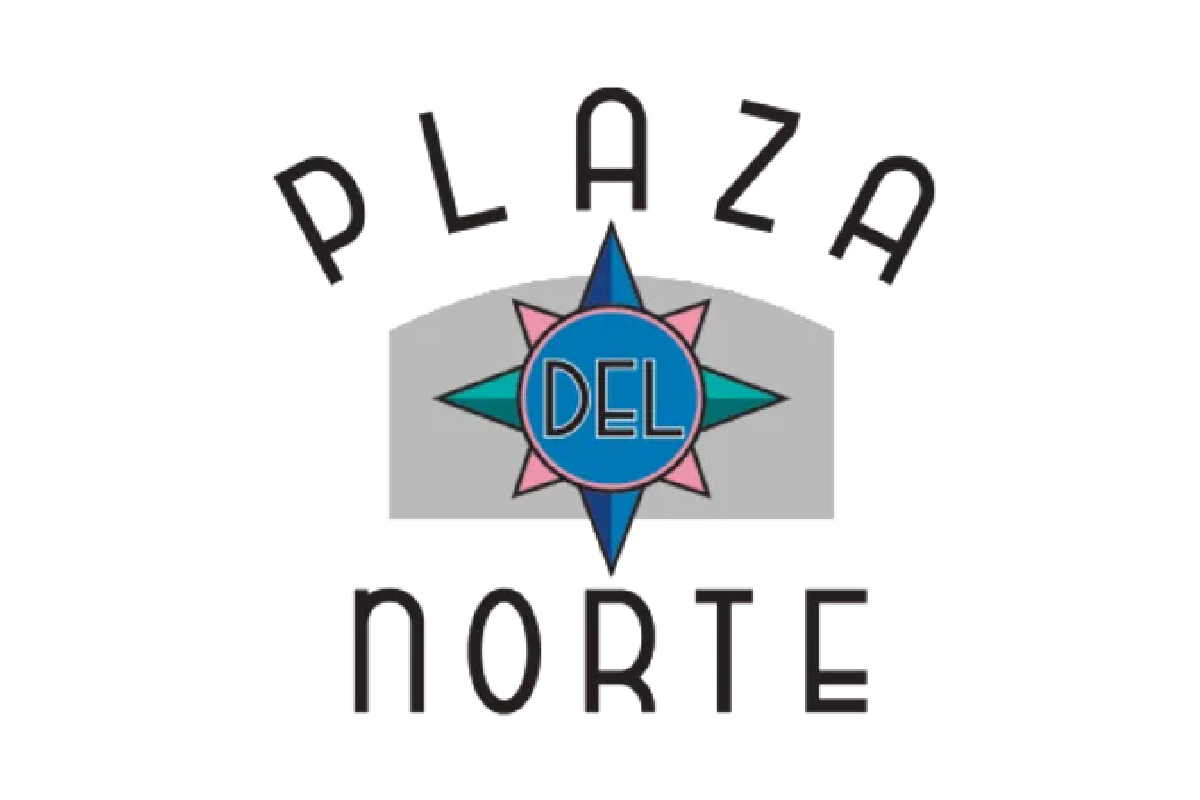

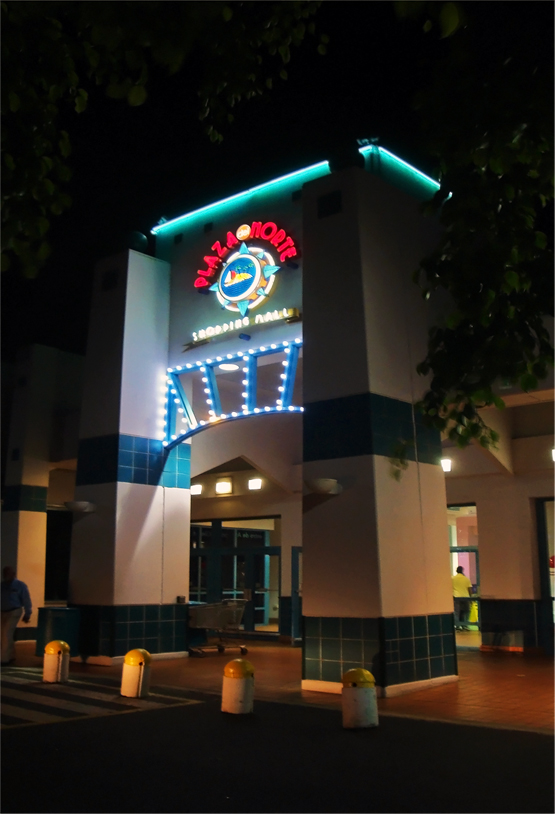
- Plaza del Norte exterior entrance before renovations
- Location: Hatillo, Puerto Rico
- Coordinates: 18°28′48″N 66°46′15″W
- Address: 506 Truncado St. Suite 110
- Opened: 1992
- Developer: HT Ventures, SE
- Manager: Curzon Puerto Rico
- Owner: Curzon Puerto Rico
- Num. of stores: 130+
- Num. of anchor tenants: 11
- Floor area: 698,581 sq ft (64,900.3 m^{2})
- Floors: 2 (Chili's, Caribbean Cinemas, Rainbow Shops, and Ross Dress For Less only)
- Website: curzon.pr/plaza-del-norte/

Plaza del Norte is a 698,581 sq ft (64,900.3 m^{2}) shopping center located in Hatillo, Puerto Rico currently owned and managed by Curzon Puerto Rico. It is the largest shopping center in northwestern Puerto Rico, with over 130 stores and fast food restaurants.

== History ==
=== 1990s-2000s ===
On May 14, 1991, the placement of the first stone was celebrated beginning construction on the Plaza del Norte shopping mall. In Spring 1992, being developed my HT Ventures, SE, Plaza del Norte inaugurated to much fanfare, featuring three main anchors, a 61,880 square-foot JCPenney, a 90,000 square-foot Sears, and a 110,580 square-foot Walmart store which was expected to create approximately 240 jobs for area residents. Due to success, it would later on receive renovations in 1995.

In December 2002, Plaza del Norte attracted visitors from all over the Island with its unique architectural design, traditional fountain, and its mix of shops in its L-shaped design. The plaza included over 120 stores including Sears, JCPenney, Walmart, Pueblo Supermarkets, RadioShack, The Disney Store, Toys R Us, Blockbuster, Contempo Casuals, GNC, Gordon's Jewelers, KB Toys, Journeys, and many others.

On August 5, 2004, it was reported that PMI Inc., owners of Plaza del Norte at the time, had pumped $250,000 into an institutional advertising campaign for the shopping mall. Designed by Sajo Garcia & Partners, it had kicked off in July of that year and would run for two years. With the title Revista (magazine), the campaign was opened by a television spot whose concept would be tailored later on to each shopping season. It would include print and radio ads, billboards, and banners inside the mall. A women's magazine appeared in the ads highlighting the fashionable products and clothes that were available at Plaza del Norte. To further promote its stores, the magazine gave tips on the latest trends in fashion and advertised where those products can be found. According to Raquel Matias, marketing director of Plaza del Norte, the campaign's target market was modern, professional, active, and cheerful women who were ever fashion-con-scious. "The participation of our retailers was vital [for the campaign's production]," said Matias, "since all clothes, footwear, and accessories used were provided by store owners and managers." Plaza del Norte was managed by PMI. Its 670,000 square foot property was home to J.C.Penney, Sears, Wal-Mart, Pueblo Supermarkets, Cine Vista Theaters, and others. Sales per square foot averaged $420 a year while food court sales per square foot averaged $1,020 a year.

In 2005, the mall was acquired by DDR Corp. from a $1.15 billion portfolio deal with Caribbean Property Group (CPG) which included the mall.

In May 2006, the mall anchored by Walmart, JCPenney, Pueblo Supermarket, Sears, and a CineVista Theatres was the dominant shopping center in the trade area due to its size and prominent location. The tenant mix within the balance of the shopping center featured a food court, restaurants, and a selection of specialty stores including The Gap, 5-7-9, Foot Locker, Kids Foot Locker, Lady Foot Locker, Champs Sports, Zales, Rave, and Motherhood Maternity, which combined to generate very strong sales per square foot.

On January 11, 2007, it was reported that the clothing store Gap would be leaving Plaza del Norte on January 26 of that month after another disappointing year for the fashion retail giant, which was widely rumored to be on the verge of being sold at the time. This left seven remaining Gap stores in Puerto Rico in addition to Gap Inc. stable mates Banana Republic and Old Navy, with two and five stores respectively. In addition, Gap Inc. would continue to operate three Gap and one Banana Republic outlets on the island.

On March 1, 2007, it was reported that CV Entertainment Group had shut down its 6-screen CineVista Theatres multiplex in Hatillo's Plaza del Norte, one of several high-profile tenants that exited or were about to leave the shopping center owned by stateside Real Estate Investment Trust (REIT) Developers Diversified Realty (DDR) at the time. In addition to the previously reported closing of Gap, sources said 1-2-3 and Infinito, which had filed for Chapter 11 bankruptcy protection along with sister stores Geraldine, Jackie's, Ranger and Fashion Bazaar, were also leaving one of Puerto Rico's largest malls. On the bright side, sources say Marshalls would soon replace the vacant Pitusa, another casualty at Plaza del Norte. According to DDR's website, 61,874 square feet, almost 10%, of the mall was now vacant. Sources said rent and common area maintenance charges soared at DDR-owned malls since the REIT purchased 15 Puerto Rico malls for US$1.15 billion in late 2004.

In November 2008, Circuit City would open a store at Plaza del Norte, this being right on the heels of its bankruptcy at the time. The store would last until 2009, when the remaining three Circuit City stores including this one would ultimately close.

=== 2010-present ===
In February 2010, the mall was now additionally anchored by an OfficeMax. It also had other stores such as Aeropostale, Aldo, Gordon's Jewelers, Foot Locker, La Gran Via, Kress, Marianne/Marianne Plus, Pacific Sunwear, Payless ShoeSource, RadioShack, Sunglass Hut, The Children's Place, The Room, and Traffic Shoes, which all combined to generate very strong sales results.

In 2011, a TJ Maxx store opened at the mall.

In 2011, DDR Corp. announced a significant interior and exterior renovation of the mall, including a 10,000-square-foot expansion and renovation of the existing JCPenney store, which now occupies part of the JCPenney wing, including the former Circuit City, which closed in 2009. The project included the addition of a Rooms To Go, the combination of three small retail-space units to accommodate a PetSmart, several other new stores and outparcels, a new Caribbean Cinemas movie theater and new carts and kiosks through the entire mall. The project was completed in mid-2013.

In early October 2015, Walmart left the mall for a Supercenter.

In 2017, the DDR Corp. would spin off its Puerto Rican shopping centers to RVI (Retail Value Inc.) due to struggles they had after the Hurricane Maria, making Retail Value Inc. the new owner of the mall at the time.

In November 2019, with an investment that exceeded $3 million, the first Econo supermarket in the municipality of Hatillo was opened at Plaza del Norte in the majority of the space of the former Walmart store.

On October 30, 2020, a new Burlington Coat Factory store opened in the remaining space of the former Walmart, opening into the mall with an interior entrance.

In February 2021, it was announced that the Sears store at Plaza del Norte would begin liquidation sales and it would be closing by April of that year.

In August 2021 Developers Diversified (DDR Corp.) came back to the PR retail landscape with a $550 million deal with RVI which Plaza del Norte was included in, making DDR the owner of the mall once again.

In 2023, a Chick-fil-A would open in the mall premises alongside an O'Reilly Auto Parts.

On May 10, 2023, it was reported that Curzon Puerto Rico, an affiliate of Curzon Advisers, was now the owner of one of the largest shopping center portfolios in Puerto Rico, formerly owned by Developers Diversified (DDR Corp.) which had acquired it again in 2021. In this portfolio of 9 shopping centers, Plaza del Norte was included, making Curzon Puerto Rico the new owners of the mall.

== Gallery ==
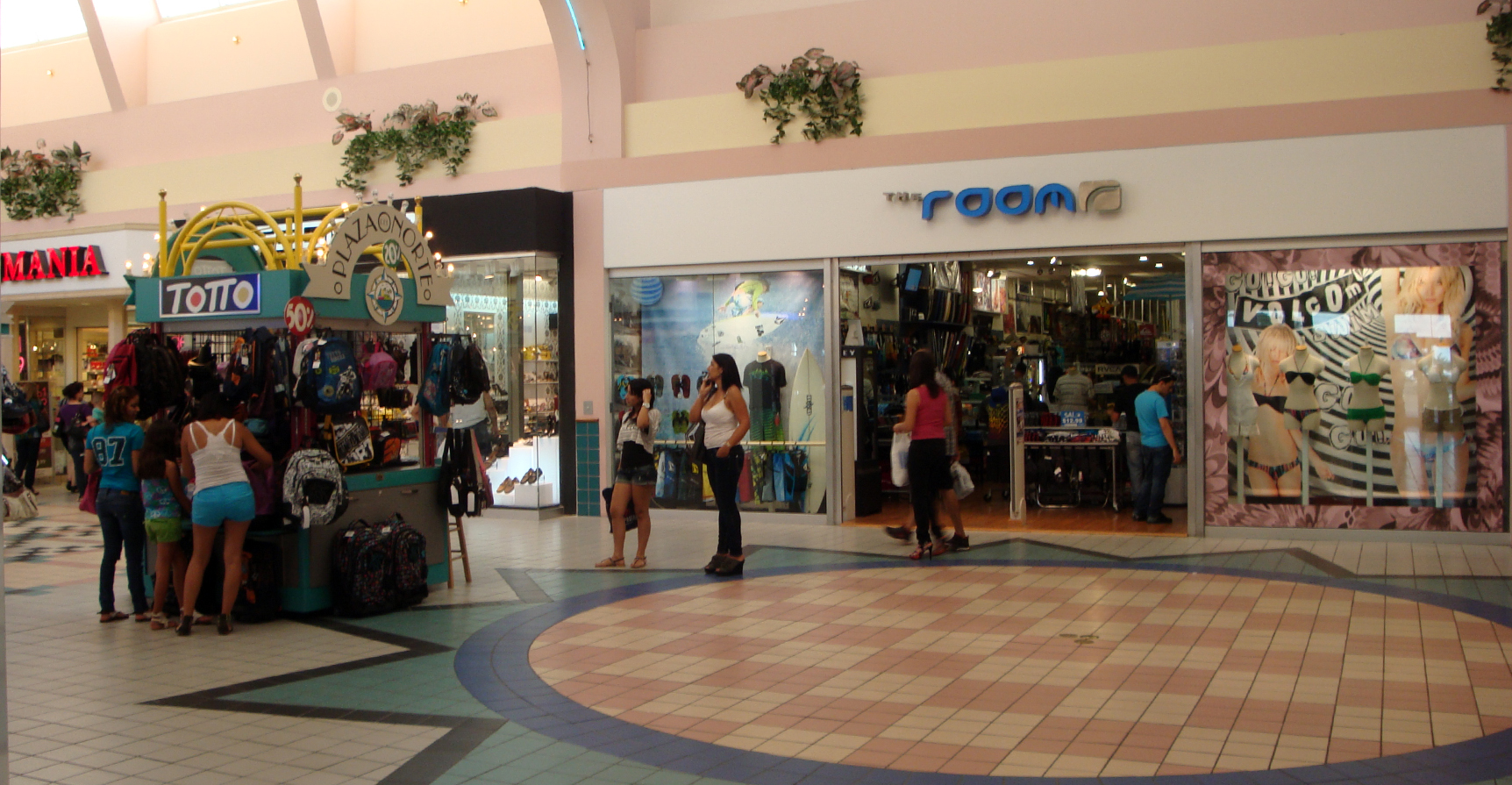
Center Court at Plaza del Norte in 2011

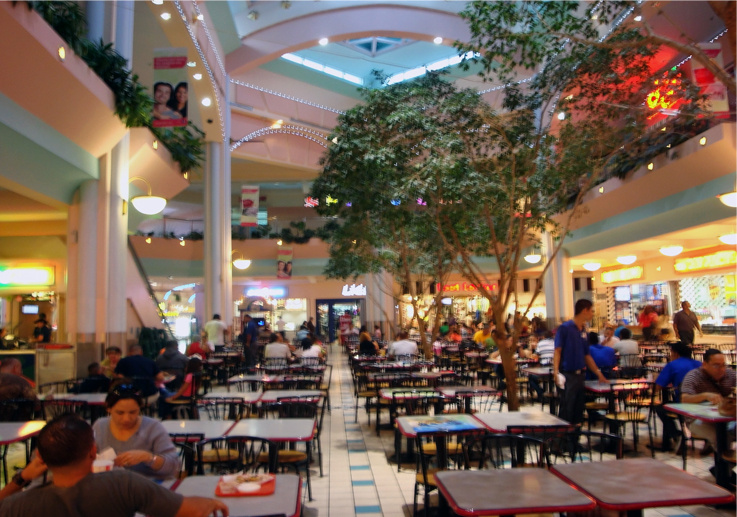
Food court at Plaza del norte in 2011

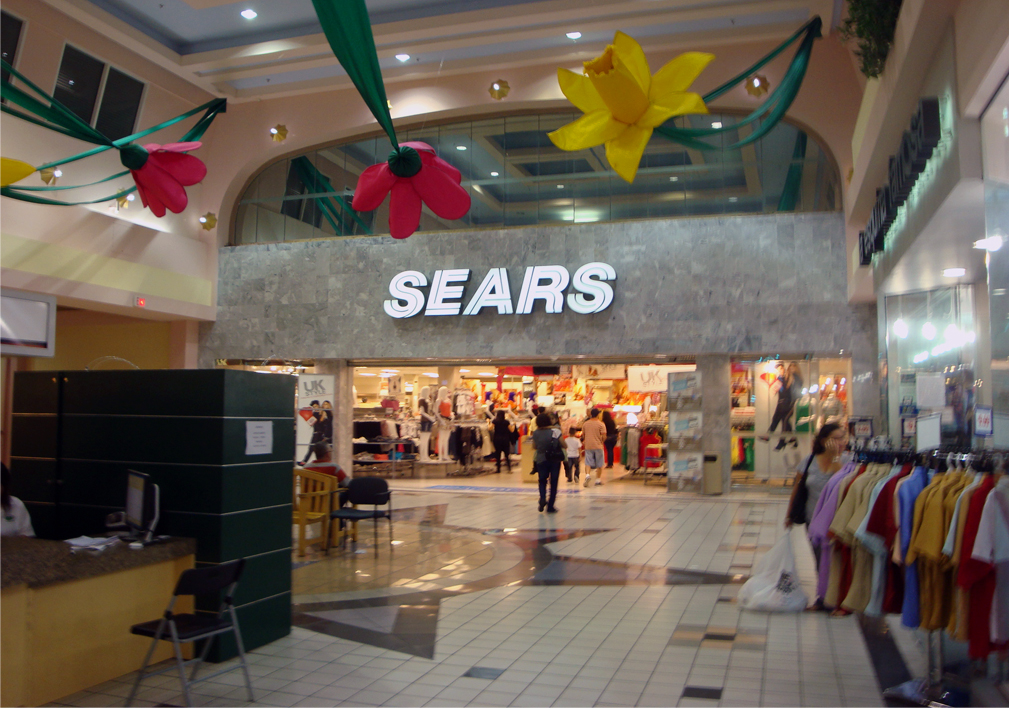
The mall entrance to the former Sears store In 2011
