= Mayagüez Mall =

Shopping mall in Mayagüez, Puerto Rico

Coordinates: 18°09′20.55″N 67°08′30.04″W

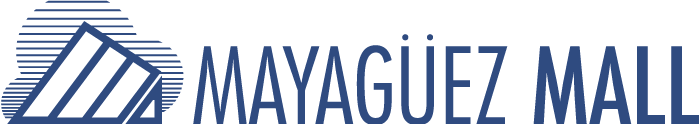

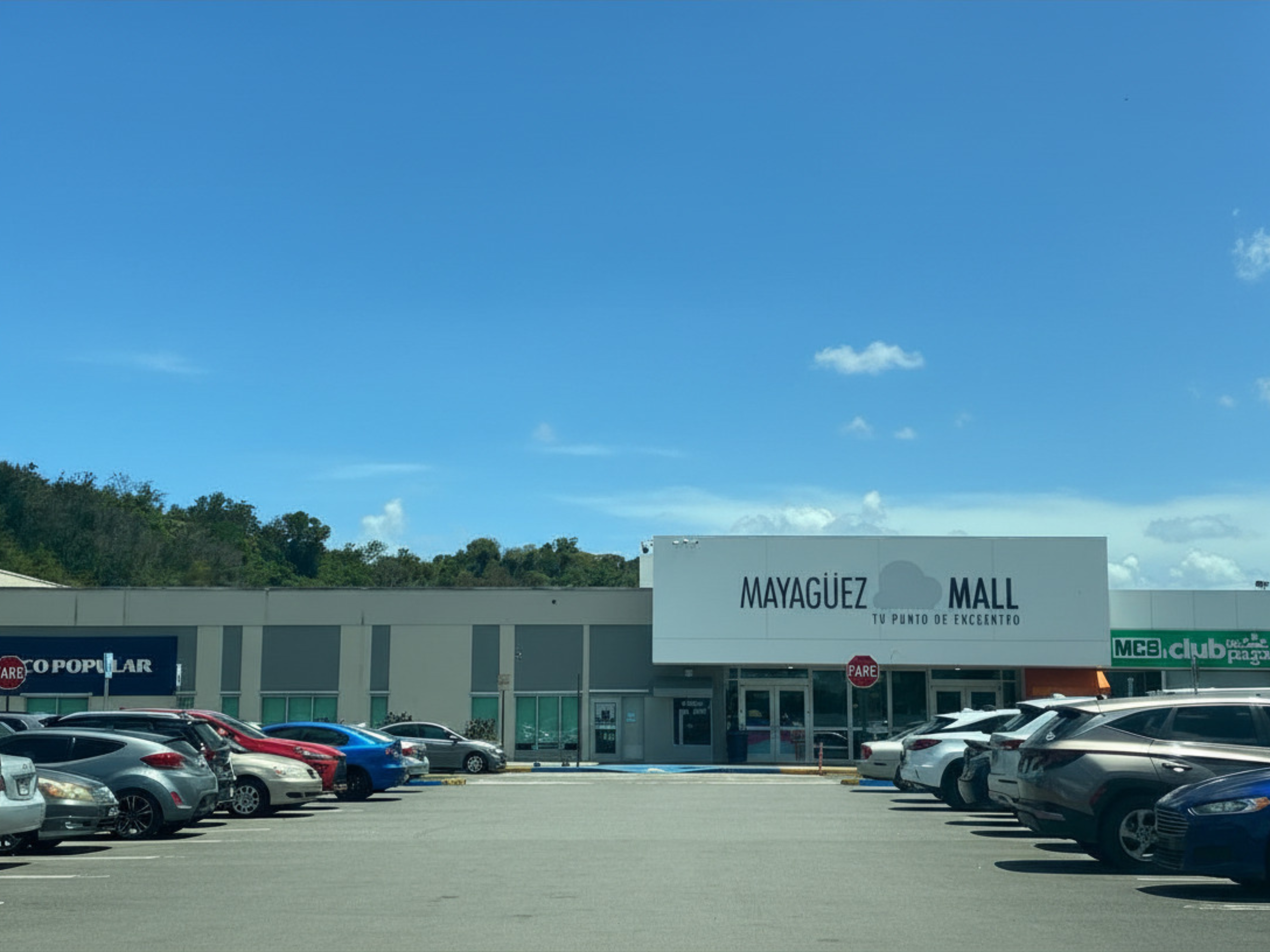
- Entrance to the mall through the JCPenney concourse adjacent to Banco Popular
- Location: Mayagüez, Puerto Rico, Hormigueros, Puerto Rico
- Address: 975 Hostos Ave. Mayagüez, PR 00680
- Opened: 4 October 1972
- Developer: Empresas Puertorriqueñas de Desarrollo, Inc.
- Owner: Empresas Villamil
- Num. of stores: 120
- Num. of anchor tenants: 11
- Floor area: 1,050,000 sq ft (97,500 m^{2})
- Floors: 1
- Parking: 6,000
- Website: mayaguezmall.com

Mayagüez Mall is a shopping mall located in the municipalities of Mayagüez and Hormigueros. It is the third largest shopping center in Puerto Rico with a total of 1,050,000 square feet (98,000 m^{2}) of retail space, and it is the main shopping center in western Puerto Rico. The mall is anchored by JCPenney, Walmart, and Mueblerías Berríos.

There is also a heliport within the mall property. The mall is made up of three concourses which connect at a central atrium.

== History ==
=== Opening and success: 1970s ===
In October 1970, a $6.5 million permanent mortgage was arranged by the Miami office of Friedman-Drew Corp. on the Mayaguez Mall. The mall was planned to be on a 38-acre tract and would have 300,000 square feet of building area including an enclosed air conditioned mall, parking for 2,000 cars would also be provided. The loan was for 27 years, lender being a New York State savings bank.

On October 3, 1972, Tiendas Capri would celebrate inaugurating at the Mayaguez Mall.

On October 4, 1972, at a cost of $12 million, being developed and administrated by Empresas Puertorriqueñas de Desarrollo Inc. a local firm represented by its president at the time Joaquín A. Villamil. Mayaguez Mall officially inaugurated with 60 establishments, of which included anchors Sears, González Padín, Woolworth, and a New York Department Stores. It also had a cinema Mayaguez Theaters, two banks, and cafeterias which served as food options. From very early in the morning, traffic to the place began to be almost paralyzed by people who wanted to witness the inauguration ceremonies and who arrived from different towns in the Western Area. The symbolic ribbon cutting was carried out by the Mayor of the city of Mayagüez, Benjamin Cole and Mrs. Sara de Villamil, wife of Mr. Joaquín Villamil, president of Empresas Puertorriqueñas de Desarrollo, Inc. After the ribbon cutting, thousands of visitors spread out through all the sectors, visibly amazed by the spaciousness and beauty of the floors, walls and decoration of the shops, as well as what was offered there in. An aspect that gained the attention of almost the entire public was the beautiful fountain that constantly changed its way of throwing water into the air. During this opening week the mall had a series of recreational and cultural events which included different artistic groups of the island. Sears was one of the first of 60 stores to open at the mall serving as an anchor and had record breaking sales. On October 27, 1972, González Padín would officially inaugurate their store at the Mayaguez Mall, serving as a junior anchor in the Sears wing of the mall.

On November 1, 1972, New York Department Stores would officially inaugurate their store at the Mayaguez Mall, serving as a junior anchor in the Woolworth wing of the mall.

On November 15, 1972, opening as the seventh establishment on the island, Walgreens would officially inaugurate at the Mayaguez Mall. This would be the 609th store in the entire Walgreens chain. The new facilities were located in an area of 10,000 square feet of space in the shopping mall, and included a cafeteria called "The Grille." The facilities had a service of cosmetics, pharmaceutical products, electronic effects, and other departments. The front of the store faced the central promenade of the shopping complex, being located in the Sears wing of the mall.

In March 1977, with the mall having sales of $46 million the previous year, plans for the mall to expand were announced. This would include expanding the north of the mall approximately 6,000 square meters that would add to the already 625 that were in use by the 60 establishments at the mall, active negotiations were also undergoing to bring establishments such as Mr. Donuts, JCPenney, Kentucky Fried Chicken, and Pizza Hut to the mall.

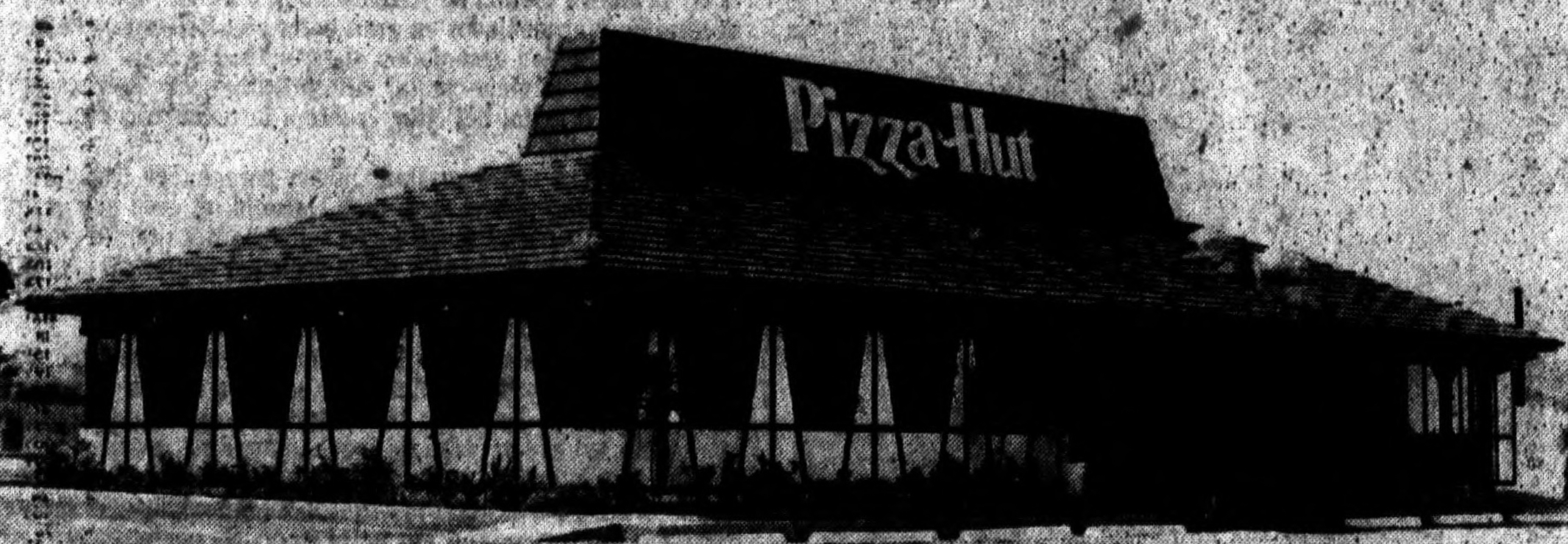
Pizza Hut on the mall premises in 1978

In February 1978, Pizza Hut opened a location on the premises of the mall, being the chains 5th location on the island at the time. In December 1979, the first B. Dalton Booksellers store in Mayaguez opened at the mall.

=== 1990s-2000s ===
On April 4, 1990, it was reported that the supermarket chain Pueblo Xtra, with an investment of nearly $7 million, would be opening its doors in the Mayaguez Mall that following June, supplying the area with 300 new jobs. In the 50,000 square feet of the supermarket, it was projected to sell a volume of $600,000 a week, for a total of $31.2 million annually. In addition, a Church's Fried Chicken was also reported to open at the mall.

During 1990 up to late 1991, the mall underwent extensive renovations, including the construction of its third and largest concourse anchored by JCPenney. In addition, Walmart would go on to open a 110,000 square-foot store at the mall in late 1991, approximately creating 240 jobs for area residents.

In October 1995, González Padín which co-anchored the Sears concourse closed when the chain ceased operations. Its former space was occupied later on by Sears Brand Central.

The former CineVista Theatres building shuttered with the rest of the chain in November 2008 and was demolished by 2010. Later on being replaced by a Romano's Macaroni Grill.

=== 2010s-present ===
In 2011, the Borders Book Store store at the mall closed with the chains bankruptcy. The store had originally opened in 2005.

On June 2, 2020, after being closed for some time during the COVID-19 pandemic, the mall reopened.

In December 2020, it was announced that Sears would be closing as part of a plan to close 23 stores nationwide. Both the main Sears store and Sears Brand Central closed in February 2021.

On May 26, 2023, it was reported that with the 50th anniversary of the mall new things were coming, it would be adding new tenants, while beginning remodeling roofs, lighting, and exterior paint changes in those coming weeks. Of these new tenants included Fit2Run, and Tijuana's, among others.

In 2025, construction work began on the former Sears anchor store which will now be occupied by multiple tenants. Planet Fitness occupied half of the former Sears Brand Central space opening its doors in April 2025. Meanwhile, Burlington will take half of the former Sears space with the store expected to open later in 2025

In October 2025 both Burlington and Bath and Body Works opened at the Mall. Burlington opened on October 13, 2025, occupying half of the former Sears building. Meanwhile, Bath and Body Works opened on October 30, 2025, occupying the former space of The Children’s Place, which in turn moved to a bigger space formerly occupied by 5-7-9 which left the mall earlier that year.

In March 2026, work continued on the former Sears section of the mall to accommodate 3 new tenants. Sephora began construction on its new store at the mall located next to the former Sears Brand Central. Mueblerías Berríos announced their intentions to move into the remaining space of the former Sears store with a furniture store concept that would include Mueblerías Berríos, Rent Express and Ashley HomeStore in one location. On September 18, 2026, Mueblerías Berríos opened in the former Sears. Other changes in this area also included tearing down the former Pier 1 Imports and turning the space into a new common area with an exit to the parking lot. The new area has modern light fixtures, new floor tiling, new columns and benches, this marks the first interior remodel of the mall in 30 years. Additionally, as part of their expansion into the Puerto Rican market O'Reilly Auto Parts is currently planning to take over the space of the former Sears Auto Center with a new store targeted to open later in 2026.

In May 2026, JD Sports announced its continued expansion across Puerto Rico, confirming plans to open several new locations throughout the island, including a new store at the Mayagüez Mall scheduled to open in September 2026.

In June 2026, two stores more stores left the mall as Marianne (a sister company from Rainbow Shops), a longtime mall tenant that had served shoppers since the mall's opening in 1972, closed its doors after more than five decades in operation, while Euromoda Sport, which had joined the mall in 2023, also ceased operations in June.

On July 2, 2026, Sephora opened at Mayagüez Mall, marking its first location serving Puerto Rico's western region.

== Gallery ==
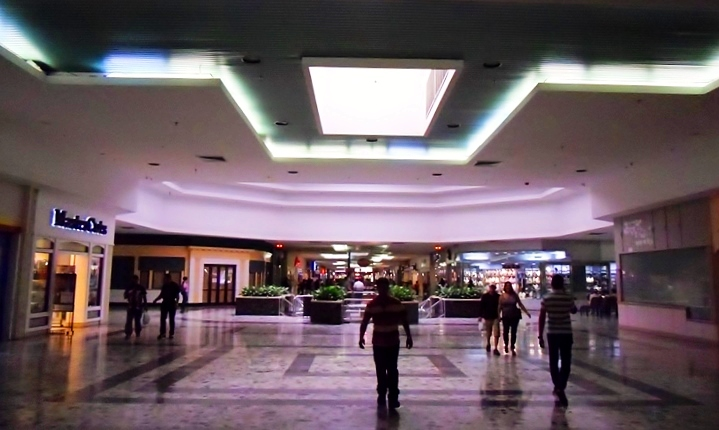
JCPenney's concourse

Mall's helipad

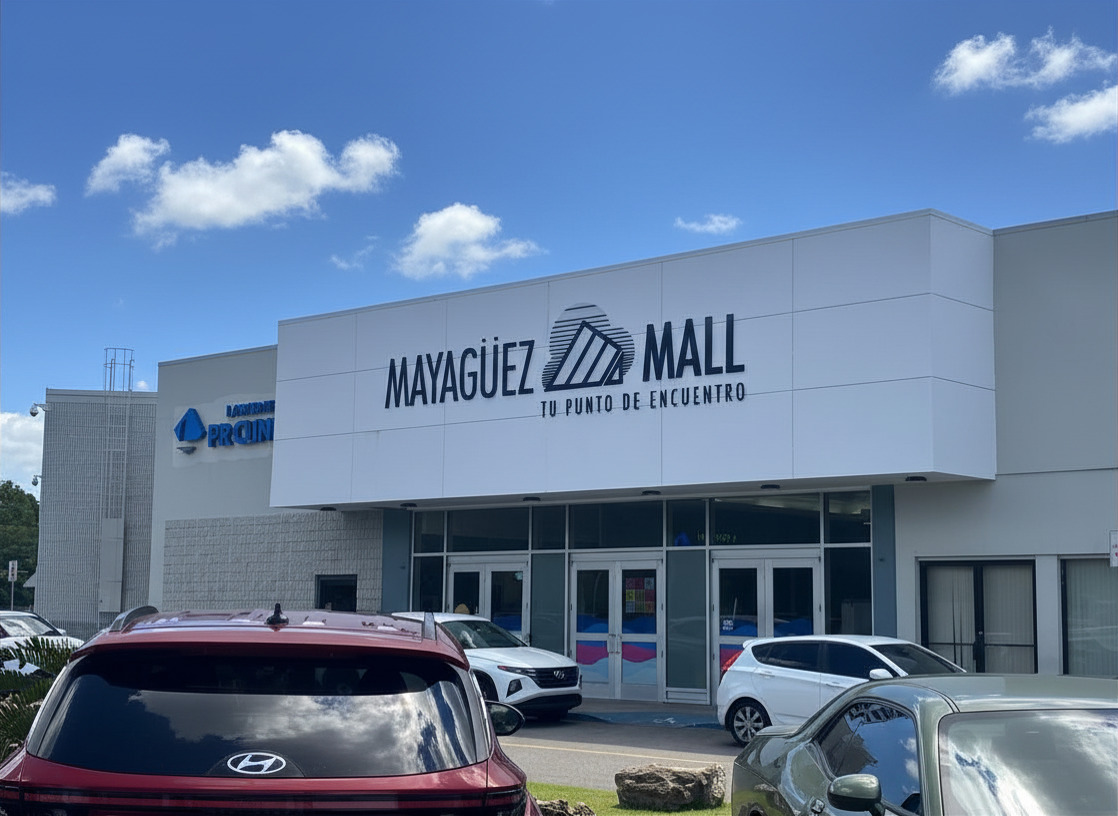
Entrance to Mall through Walmart's concourse
