= Caribbean Cinemas =

Chain of movie theaters in the Caribbean

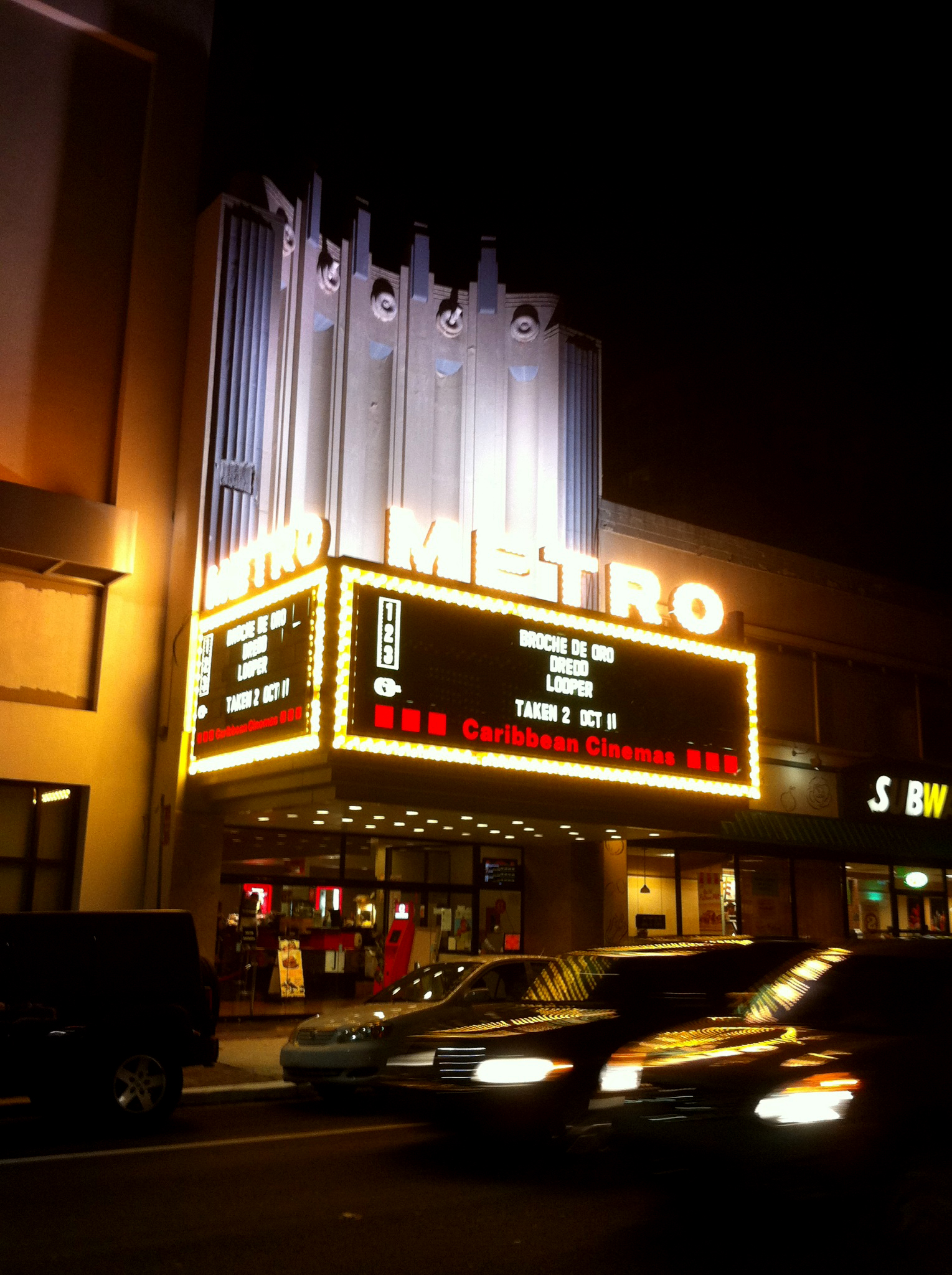
- Caribbean Cinemas Metro location in Santurce, pictured in 2012
- Type: Private
- Industry: Leisure, entertainment and refreshments
- Founded: June 19, 1969; 57 years ago
- Founder: Victor Carrady
- Headquarters: San Juan, Puerto Rico
- Number of locations: 47
- Area served: Greater Antilles; Lesser Antilles; Central America
- Key people: Robert Carrady (President)
- Products: Films (Digital 3D, premium large format, IMAX, 4DX), tickets, popcorn, drinks and confectionery
- Website: home.caribbeancinemas.com

Caribbean Cinemas is a chain of movie theaters in Puerto Rico and the Caribbean. It is the only major chain in Puerto Rico following CineVista's bankruptcy. The chain has expanded into Dominican Republic, Panama, St. Thomas, St. Croix, St. Maarten, Barbados, St. Kitts, St. Lucia, Antigua, Aruba, Trinidad and Tobago, Guyana, Curaçao, Guadeloupe (under the brand Cinéstar), Guatemala and Bolivia.

== History and expansion ==
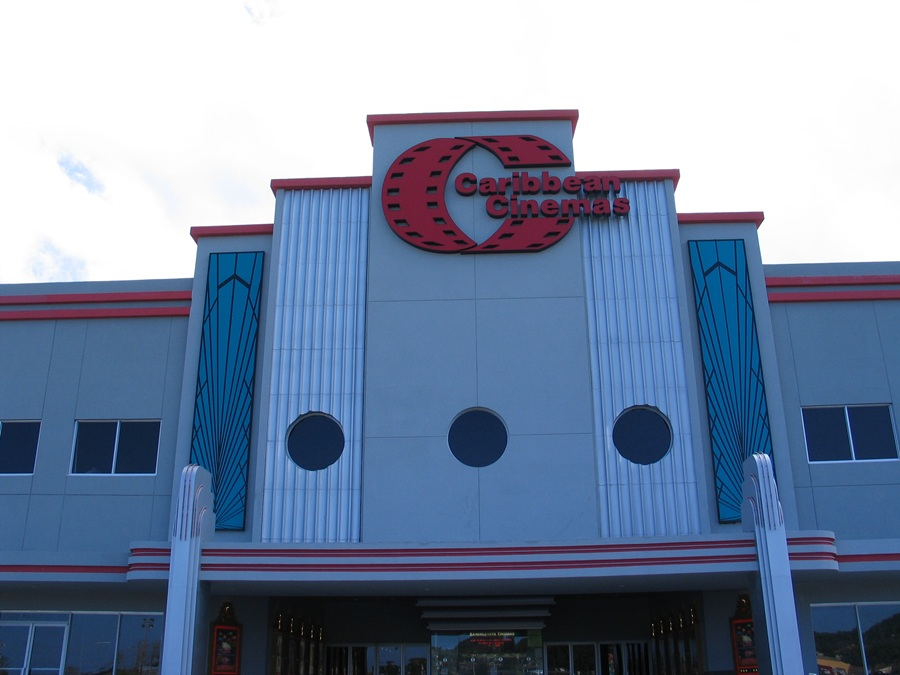
Caribbean Cinemas, located at Puerto Rico Premium Outlets in Barceloneta, Puerto Rico.

In 2005, Caribbean Cinemas bought the second floor CineVista location at Plaza Las Américas after it was closed by the latter company; reopening under the Caribbean Cinemas brand as the largest of the chain, with 17 auditoriums. In 2007, CineVista also closed its location on the second floor of Plaza del Norte before declaring bankruptcy and ultimately going out of business; Caribbean Cinemas also opted to buy out the empty space five years later and reopened as Caribbean Cinemas in May 2012 with 5 auditoriums and one in 3D.

On June 19, 2019, Caribbean Cinemas celebrated its 50th anniversary by offering all movie screenings at opening day prices that day only.

In 2020, during the COVID-19 pandemic, the chain launched a series of drive-in theaters, including one at Distrito T-Mobile.

In 2021, Caribbean Cinemas had 31 locations in Puerto Rico.

== Digital 3D ==
In February 2009, Caribbean Cinemas debuted its first digital 3D theater with Jonas Brothers: The 3D Concert Experience at Plaza las Américas. Over the years, more digital 3D films have been projected in most locations with at least one auditorium optimized for it.

== Caribbean Cinemas Extreme (CXC) ==
In December 2014, Caribbean Cinemas opened its first premium large format auditorium, dubbed Caribbean Cinemas Extreme (CXC), at Las Catalinas Mall, a premium large screen reserved seating theater format. It utilizes a 4K projector and employs Dolby Atmos sound system, transmitting 128 audio channels and over 30,000 watts of power to over 60 speakers located throughout the auditorium for a 360° sound. In the following months, four more auditoriums have been converted in locations at Plaza las Américas, Plaza del Caribe, Plaza Guaynabo and Barceloneta. Montehiedra was added a CXC after its major renovation in 2016, making it the fifth large format screen of the company. Subsequently, CXC auditoriums were added in Las Piedras in 2023 and Arecibo in 2024 following major renovations. In addition, CXC auditoriums were implemented in Plaza Carolina when it opened in 2018, as well as Distrito T-Mobile in 2021.

As of 2024, Liberty serves as the corporate sponsor for CXC auditoriums.

== IMAX and 4DX ==
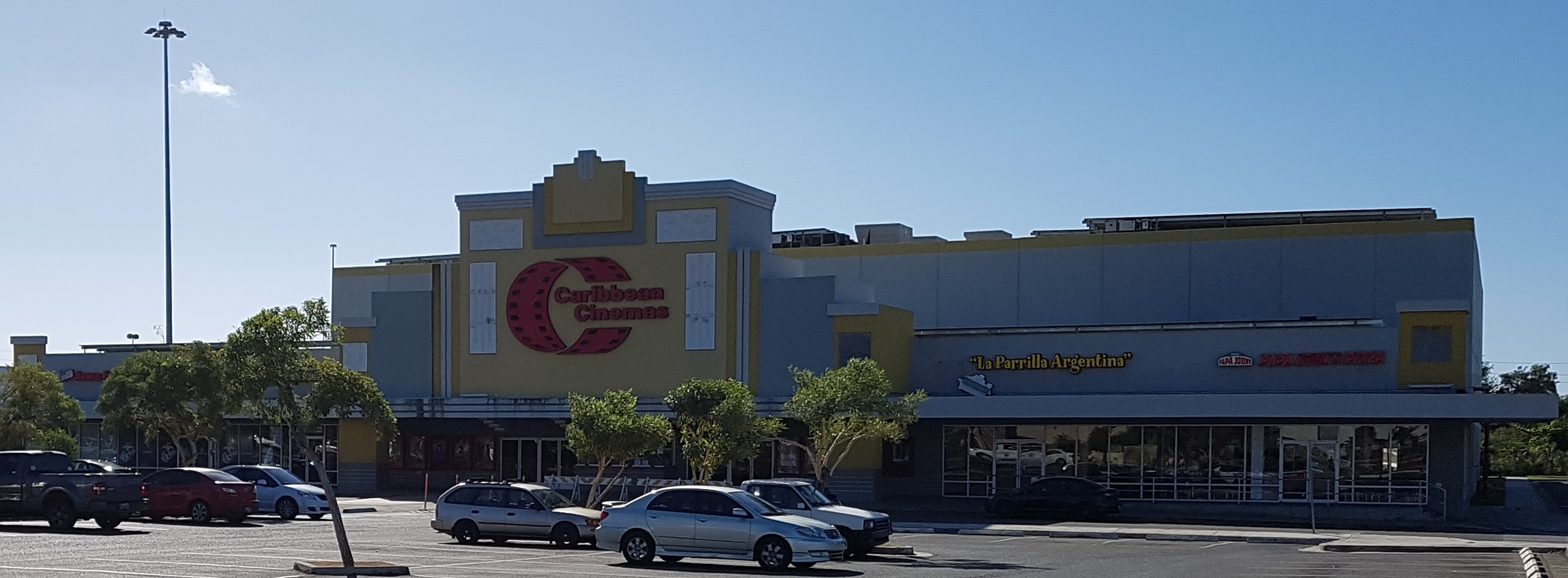
Caribbean Cinemas at Plaza del Caribe in Ponce

In February 2016, Caribbean Cinemas announced the arrival of the first IMAX and 4DX theaters to the Montehiedra location, which meant it had to undergo a complete renovation. As part of plans, a second floor was to be constructed for the IMAX theater, meaning that of the 14 auditoriums it has always had since 1996, two had to be merged to meet the standards of an IMAX theater to accommodate up to 400 people. Another renovation to the Montehiedra location is the first 4DX theater auditorium in Puerto Rico with synchronized motion seats, and special effects such as strobe lightning, mists, wind and bubbles. In May 2016, Caribbean Cinemas announced that AT&T and Toyota would be the corporate sponsors to the IMAX and 4DX theaters, respectively, upon their opening at Montehiedra Cinemas. It reopened in June 2016 debuting the first IMAX and 4DX auditoriums in Puerto Rico.

It was announced in August 2018 that Caribbean Cinemas would be opening a theater at Plaza Carolina which would also be the second theater of the chain to have IMAX and 4DX auditoriums; it opened in November of that same year.

=== 4D E-Motion ===
In May 2023, Caribbean Cinemas announced the opening of an auditorium with enhanced technology similar to 4DX, called 4D E-Motion, in Las Piedras following a renovation. A 4D E-Motion auditorium was later opened in Ponce Towne and Arecibo in 2024. In early 2026, another 4D E-Motion was opened in Western Plaza.

== Caribbean Cinemas VIP ==
In October 2016, Caribbean Cinemas announced that a new location, and its first premium format, dubbed Caribbean Cinemas VIP, would be built in the Puerto Rico Convention Center District, with seven auditoriums, and one in premium large format.

In February 2019, Caribbean Cinemas announced the reopening of its location in San Patricio Plaza as a VIP Cinema location, which would include 8 auditoriums, following a renovation. These include reclining leather seats, as well as a lounge-type lobby, a full-service restaurant and bar, two activity rooms and laser projection.

The location at Distrito T-Mobile, which was originally announced in 2016, opened in July 2021, before the rest of the entertainment complex's inauguration.

== Cine Kids ==
In June 2022, Caribbean Cinemas opened Cine Kids, a special auditorium designed for children ages 2 to 10 with a play area and a slide, at the Las Catalinas location in Caguas, Puerto Rico as part of a renovation. A Cine Kids auditorium was also added to the Arecibo location in 2024 following a major renovation.

== See also ==
- List of movie theater chains
