= Plaza Río Hondo =

Shopping mall in Bayamón, Puerto Rico

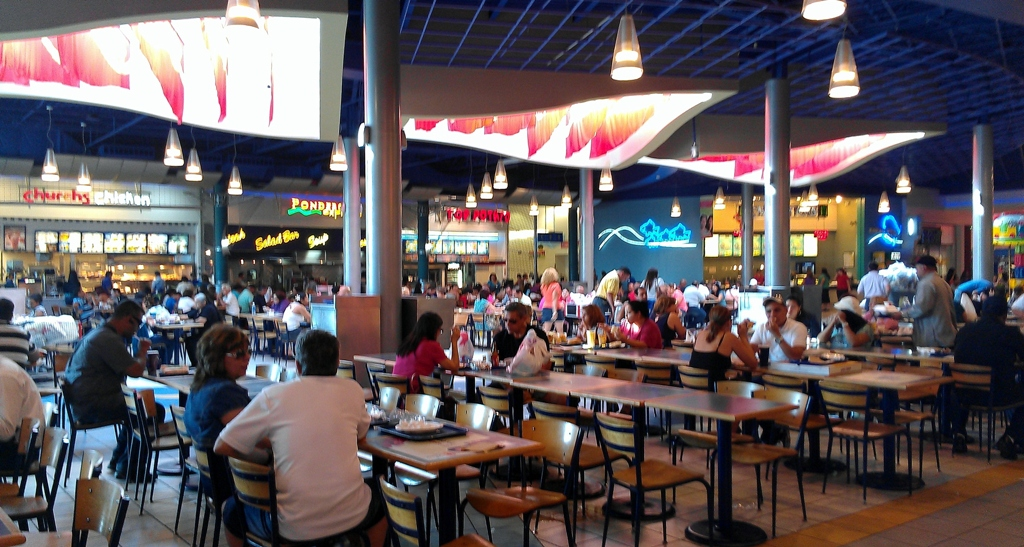
- Plaza Río Hondo's food court before renovations
- Location: Bayamón, Puerto Rico
- Coordinates: 18.422960°N 66.161490°W
- Address: 60 Río Hondo Ave Suite 8080
- Opened: 1982
- Developer: Wilder-Manley Associates
- Manager: Curzon Puerto Rico
- Owner: Curzon Puerto Rico
- Num. of stores: 100+
- Num. of anchor tenants: 8
- Floor area: 554,892 square feet (51,551 m^{2})
- Floors: 1
- Website: curzon.pr/plaza-rio-hondo/

Plaza Río Hondo is a shopping mall in Bayamón, Puerto Rico. It opened in 1982 and is anchored by Marshalls Megastore, Caribbean Cinemas, TJ Maxx, Best Buy, Golden Corral, Pueblo Supermarkets, Chili's Grill & Bar, Walgreens, and PetSmart.

== History ==
=== Opening and success: 1980s ===
The 350,000 square foot Plaza Río Hondo at the time was first owned and developed by the firm Wilder-Manley Associates and represented an investment of $25 million. The mall was also managed by the firm Wilder-Manley of Puerto Rico, Inc., a subsidiary of WMA.

On March 31, 1982, the first group of stores at the mall first opened, of which included Pueblo Supermarkets. The second few group of stores opened at the end of July of that year. This included Barker's, Woolworth, La Giralda, and many more.

In July 1982, Barker's one of the stores anchoring the mall inaugurated being the chains 16th store on the island.

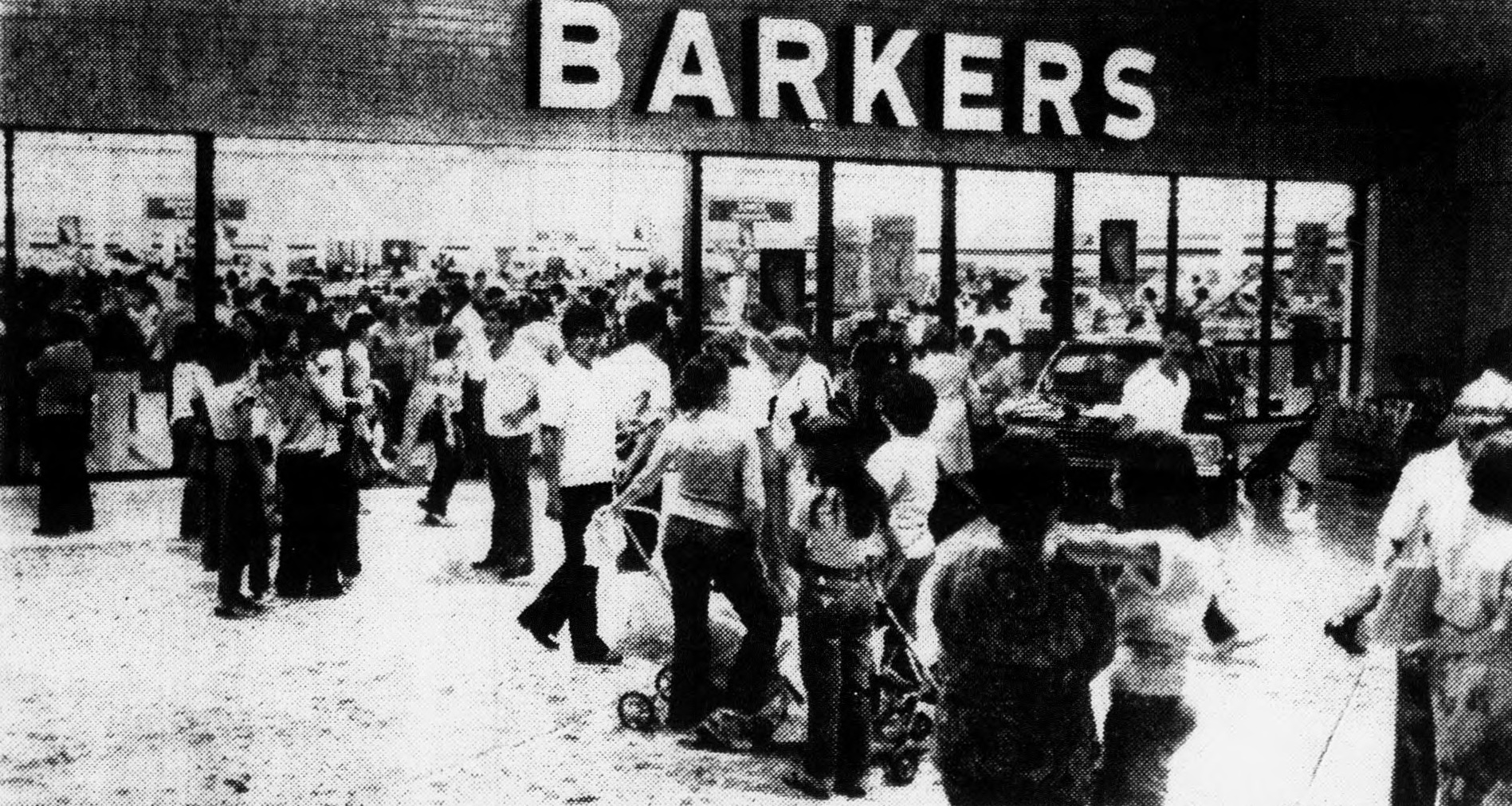
Barker's store during inauguration

In November 1982, the mall had inauguration events including things such as fashion shows, exhibitions, and music. These events took place starting on the 5th of that month and ending in December of that year. The mall opened with 70 stores of which included Barker's, Woolworth, Pueblo Supermarket, Walgreens, Kinney Shoes, Gordon's, Marianne, La Favorita, Centro Disco, Thom McAn, Hallmark, Almacenes Rodríguez, Flagg Shoes, Madison, Preciosa, Butler Shoes, Lerner's, Almacenes Karlo, RadioShack, Baker Shoes, Zales, Rahola, Tiffany Bakery, Land of Oz, Lee Borinquen, Taco Paco, Burger King, Golden Skillet, Almacenes González, La Giralda, and many more. It also featured on opening free parking for over 2,000 cars.

On October 20, 1983, after the acquiring of 5 Barker's stores on the island by the Kmart Corporation, a new Kmart store would inaugurate at Plaza Río Hondo in the former Barker's space.

On March 26, 1985, a Ponderosa Steakhouse opened at the mall.

On July 3, 1986, the Río Hondo Cinemas a 6-screen cinema opened owned by the Caribbean Cinemas chain. It opened with premieres such as Cobra, The Karate Kid Part II, Off Beat, Poltergeist II: The Other Side, and Psycho III.

=== Renovations, expansions, and success: 1990s-2000s ===
In November 1994, it was reported that the then 394,400 square foot mall would remodel and expand under the ownership of Manley Berenson. Originally, Plaza Río Hondo had a "large box" look. The owner characterized the mall as looking like a factory. The goal of this renovation was, to quote the owner, "to break out of the box." The new look which brought forth the remodeling of both the exterior and interior of the mall, consisted of a river theme throughout the whole mall featuring bright, tropical colors, suggesting the tropical landscape and seascape of Puerto Rico. This encouraged the tenants to renovate their own spaces. The center was re-merchandised to meet the needs of all kinds of consumer budgets. Among the new stores were Bostonian, Payless ShoeSource, a bookstore, a GNC Nutrition store, an upscale men's clothing store, and kiosks for cellular telephones, candy and jewelry. Plaza Río Hondo remained open for business during its fast-track construction schedule, which allowed the renovation to be substantially complete for the 1994 Christmas season. These renovations would be fully complete by February 1995. By then the 425,000 square foot mall, would be anchored by a 92,000 square foot Kmart, a 36,000 square foot Woolworth, a 19,700 square foot La Giralda, and a 9,000 square foot Walgreens as a junior anchor.

In 1996, the International Council of Shopping Centers awarded Plaza Río Hondo with the "International Design and Development Award" for its layout and style, this was given to the mall after the major renovations it had in 1994 into 1995.

In 1997, the Woolworth store at the mall closed after the chain went under that year.

In late 1998, management Yebba Realty Ventures at the time purchased the lease from F.W. Woolworth Company of their 36,680 square foot store at the mall for $800,000 with the intention of expanding the premises to accommodate the addition of two new junior anchor stores Marshalls and Tiendas Capri.

In April 1998, management at the time Yebba Realty Ventures believed that Plaza Río Hondo required additional food services within the mall. Shortly after the acquisition a long-time tenant, with considerable lease term remaining and a store occupying some 20,000 square feet at the center of the mall began to experience financial difficulties, management immediately entered into negotiations to purchase the lease, which they were able to do for $600,000. A 12-unit food court plus 2 outside facing retail bays were complete at a total cost of approximately $3,645,000. The first year net income generated from the food court was approximately $1,112,280. The total cost of the lease buy-out and food court construction was approximately $4,245,000 thereby equating to a yield on investment of 26.2%. Again applying a 10% cap rate to the net operating income stream, Management created additional net value of $6,877,800. Beyond that, the food court increased the business at the mall.

In 1999, after the redevelopment of the former Woolworth store, both Marshalls and Capri would inaugurate that year. Marshalls, having the highest grossing opening day in the history of the chain on a sales per square foot basis at the time.

In 2001, Yebba Realty Ventures sold the mall to Caribbean Property Group (CPG) for a purchase price of $16,683,080 million.

On June 17, 2004, it was reported that Plaza Río Hondo would soon become home to a Marshalls MegaStore (featuring HomeGoods inside Marshalls store) and CompUSA's flagship store in Puerto Rico, said Martha Hermilla, the mall's marketing manager. "This year, we are adding a 55,000 square foot space for a Marshalls Mega Store. The space currently occupied by a regular Marshalls will be occupied by CompUSA, which intends this to be its flagship store on the island,” said Hermilla. Apparel & domestics retailer Marshalls' megastore would be a freestanding building on an outparcel beside the Pueblo supermarket. Occupying 33,000 square feet, the regular Marshalls at Plaza Rio Hondo would close. Computer retailer CompUSA's store at Plaza Rio Hondo would be the company's second on the island. The first, occupying 22,000 square feet, was in Guaynabo's Plaza Caparra. Also planned to kick off at Plaza Rio Hondo that year was an expansion of the mall by some 20,000 square feet and the refurbishment of its interiors. "It is going to be a major renovation," said Hermilla. Although she said all construction was to begin in those following few months, she couldn't say when the projects would be completed. Plaza Rio Hondo, at the time occupied 461,989 square feet and had more than 90 stores. The mall's sales per square foot averaged $450; the food court generated per square foot sales averaging of $770. Including Plaza Rio Hondo, PMI Inc. managed 17 properties in Puerto Rico with more than 28,000 parking spaces, more than 5.3 million square feet of gross leasable space, and more than 800 merchants.

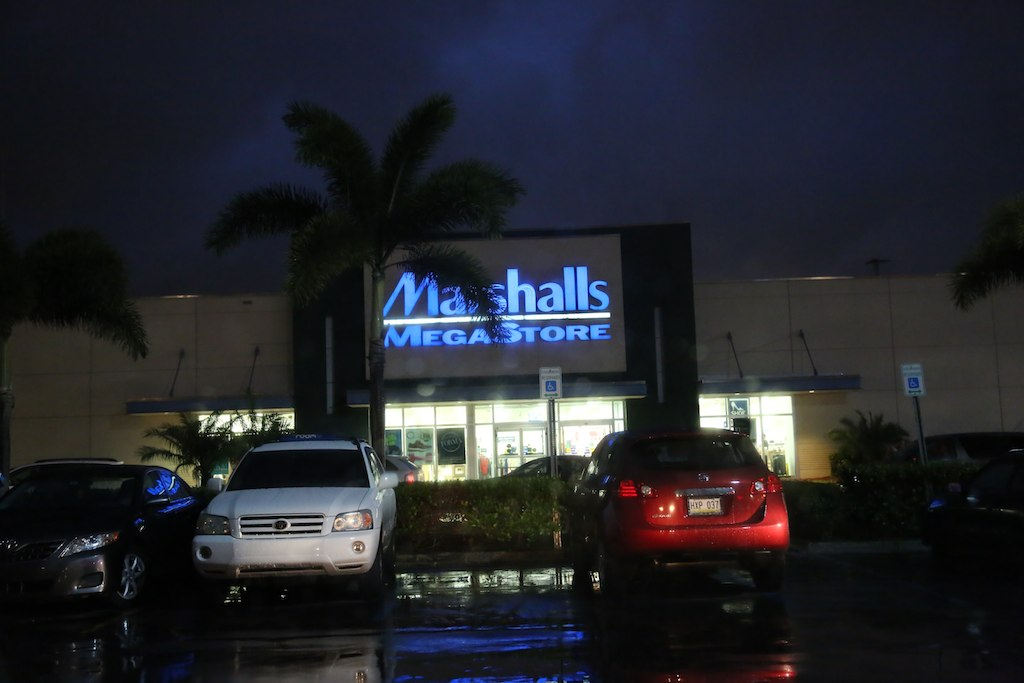
Marshalls Mega Store at Plaza Rio Hondo

On August 19, 2004, it was reported that The Children's Place had plans to open a store at the mall by December of that year.

In December 2004, the mall had more than 90 establishments at the time such as a Big Kmart, Marshalls, Tiendas Capri, Walgreens, Pueblo Xtra, Rave, Rave Girls, 5-7-9, Tiendas Kress, Click, Marianne, Clubman, Champs Sports, Foot Locker, KB Toys, Payless ShoeSource, GameStop, RadioShack, Blockbuster Video, GNC, Pearle Vision Center, Zales, Claire's, Rainbow, and others. It would also feature food options such as Burger King, Kentucky Fried Chicken, Ponderosa, Soft & Creamy, Subway, Taco Bell, and others.

In 2005, the mall was acquired by DDR Corp. from a $1.15 billion portfolio deal with Caribbean Property Group (CPG) which included the mall.

In 2008, CompUSA closed and was replaced by a Best Buy that same year.

=== 2010-present ===
On August 4, 2011, TJ Maxx would open a 30,000 square foot store at the mall, replacing the space formerly occupied by a Tiendas Capri.

On January 24, 2012, that the Anna's Linens chain, had plans to open a store in Plaza Río Hondo, the store would occupy a space of 5,600 square feet and the opening was anticipated to be that year.

In 2014, DDR Corp. announced a full remodel of the mall, the changes included new facades and architectural elements that would allow in natural lighting, and the inclusion of expanding the variety of retailers inside of the mall.

In 2017, DDR Corp. spun off its Puerto Rican shopping centers to RVI (Retail Value Inc.) due to struggles they had after the Hurricane Maria, making Retail Value Inc. the new owner of the mall at the time.

On November 6, 2019, it was announced that the Kmart store at the mall would be closing in February 2020.

In August 2021, Developers Diversified (DDR Corp.) came back to the PR retail landscape with a $550 million deal with RVI of which Plaza Rio Hondo was included in, making DDR the owner of the mall once again.

On May 10, 2023, it was reported that Curzon Puerto Rico, an affiliate of Curzon Advisers, was now the owner of one of the largest shopping center portfolios in Puerto Rico, formerly owned by Developers Diversified (DDR Corp.) which had acquired it again in 2021. In this portfolio of 9 shopping centers, Plaza Río Hondo was included, making Curzon Puerto Rico the new owners of the mall.

On January 29, 2024, it was reported that the Aliss department store, located at the mall had begun the process of closing its operations, which would end on that January 31. Regarding Aliss' departure from Plaza Río Hondo, Martha E. Hermilla, the senior marketing director of Curzon Puerto Rico, clarified that it had been a decision by the landlord. However, the company already had a tenant for the space. According to Hermilla, Golden Corral would be occupying the former 13,156-square-foot location of a Grand Stores department store, expanding it to 15,406 square feet. Therefore, Grand Stores would be relocating to the former 7,875 square foot location that Aliss occupied, expanding it to 10,125 square feet.

In 2025, a Golden Corral opened at the mall.
