= Plaza del Sol (Puerto Rico) =

Shopping mall in Bayamón, Puerto Rico

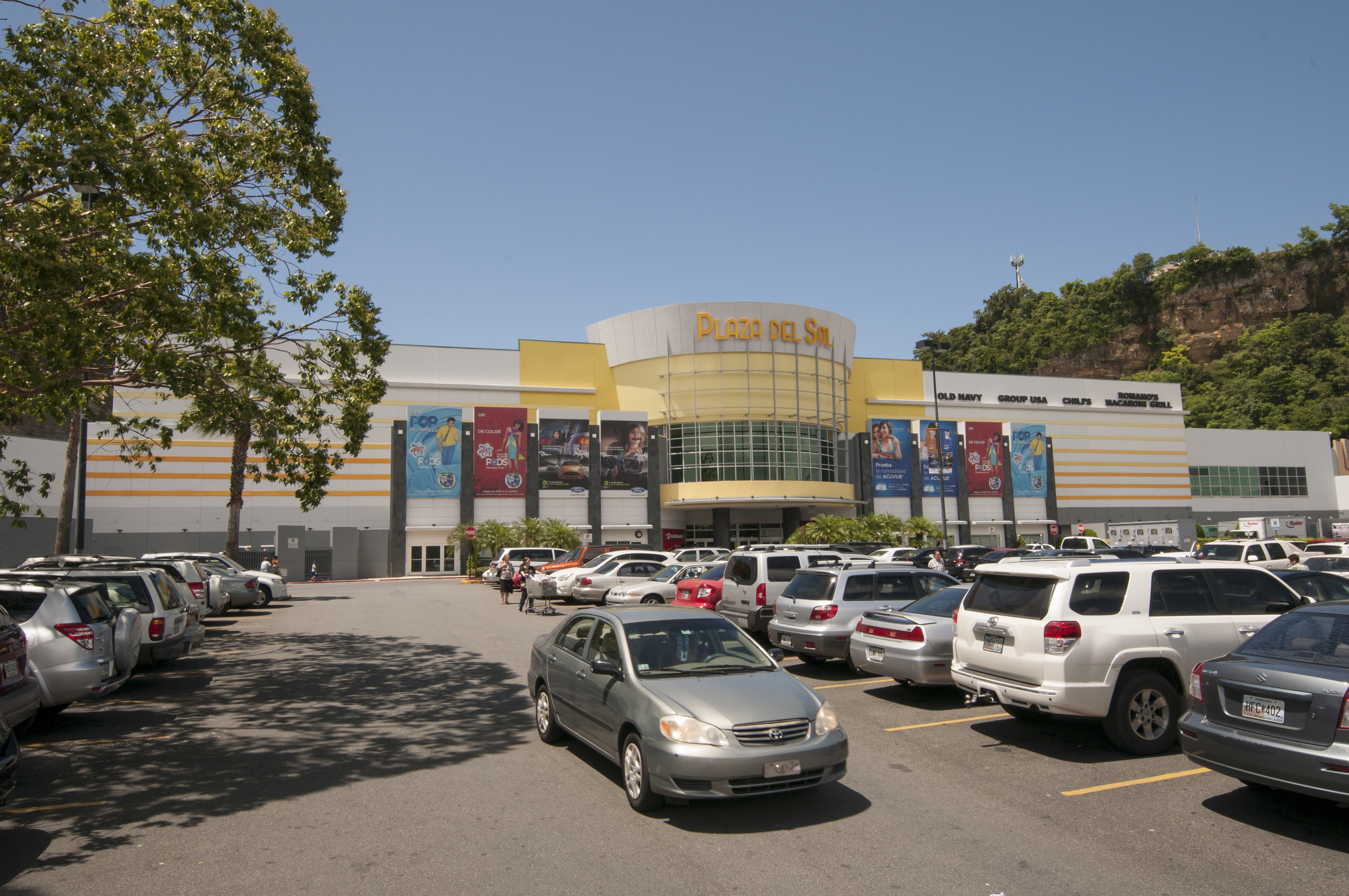
- Plaza del Sol entrance, 2015
- Location: Bayamón, Puerto Rico
- Coordinates: 18.4061°N 66.1636°W
- Address: 725 West Main Ave Suite 600
- Opened: 1998
- Developer: BY Ventures, SE
- Manager: Curzon Puerto Rico
- Owner: Curzon Puerto Rico
- Num. of stores: 150+
- Num. of anchor tenants: 7
- Floor area: 728,546 sq ft (67,684.1 m^{2})
- Floors: 2 (2nd floor located in food court)
- Website: curzon.pr/plaza-del-sol/

Plaza del Sol is a 728,546-square-foot (67,684.1 m^{2}) regional mall located in the city of Bayamón, Puerto Rico. The mall is anchored by a Caribbean Cinemas, Walmart, Burlington, H&M, Dave & Buster's and The Home Depot. The mall was opened in 1998; it was later acquired in 2005 by DDR Corp. out of a $1.15 billion portfolio deal with Caribbean Property Group (CPG), which included the mall. And is now owned by Curzon Puerto Rico.

== History ==
=== Opening and success: 1990s-2000s ===
In 1998, developed as a joint venture between BY Ventures, SE, and Walmart, Plaza del Sol would open with more than 50 stores to much fanfare including a 16,000 square foot Group Usa, a 16,000 square foot Old Navy, a 20,000 square foot Pep Boys, and a 9,000 square foot Mikasa store. Its main anchors being Walmart, a 112,000 square foot Home Depot, and a Bed Bath & Beyond. It would also feature a food court, the Café del Sol, restaurants, a 14-screen Caribbean Cinemas, and a carousel.

In January 2001, the at the time 612,000 square foot Plaza del Sol would feature 109 stores such as Payless ShoeSource, Journeys, 5-7-9, Charlotte Russe, Kress, Rave, Motherhood Maternity, Gap, Zales Jewelers, Sally Beauty, Afterthoughts, GNC, KB Toys, Electronics Boutique, and others.

In September 2003, it was reported that Plaza del Sol had reported higher sales August that year than the past year; among the best performers were the food court, the movie theater, and Walmart, said at the time Marketing Manager Valerie Castro. "Food court sales were spectacular. One thing that helped was the opening of El Meson Express. During its first month, the eatery registered sales of $100,000; that's a record-breaker," said Castro. "Overall, food court sales in August were 5.7% higher than in the same month in 2002." She noted that average sales per square foot at the food court were $1,074. "These sales are a good indicator of how much traffic we receive," said Castro. She estimated that an average of some one million consumers visited the mall each month. "It gets even better at Christmas," she said. The mall's movie theater had reported 20.2% higher sales over August 2002. "In June they increased 23.8%," said Castro. She attributed the sales gain to the blockbuster movies launched during summer. Castro said Walmart, among the first to open at Plaza del Sol in 1998, reported that sales had increased 7% or $4 million from 2001 to 2002. The shopping center's overall sales in August had jumped 1% over the same month that past year. "Average sales per square foot are $508," said Castro.

In April 2004, it was reported that Johnny Rockets of Puerto Rico Inc, the at the time new local franchisee of retro-style restaurant chain Johnny Rockets, was opening an eatery in Bayamon's Plaza del Sol that week, the first of three it planned for the island in 10 years. "We will have a soft opening April 23 from 3:00 p.m. until 10:00 p.m., said Craig Doyle, then operations manager of Johnny Rockets of Puerto Rico. The restaurant, which would be available for private activities, would occupy 2,056 square feet in a corner on the mall's second floor and would have about 70 employees, including management. Doyle said the soft opening would also help management pick which employees will be shift leaders and certified training managers.

In August 2004, it was reported that Plaza del Sol would begin construction on a multistory parking lot, it would be adding 400 parking spaces to the 3,400 the mall already had. Two hundred of the 400 new spaces were expected to be ready by Christmas of that year.

In November 2004, it was reported that Developers Diversified Realty (DDR) had announced it had entered into an agreement to purchase 15 Puerto Rican retail real estate assets, totaling nearly 5.0 million square feet from Caribbean Property Group, LLC ("CPG"). The transaction had a total value of approximately $1.15 billion, which represented a 7.4% cap rate on a pro-forma basis without the benefit of straight-line rents. The transaction was expected to close during the first quarter of 2005, subject to the company's due diligence and standard closing conditions. This transaction included Plaza del Sol, which was one of the many shopping centers acquired by DDR through the deal, making DDR owners of the shopping mall. The deal would officially be completed on January 27, 2005.

In January 2005, it was reported that after years of eyeing the local market, electronics mega retailer Best Buy had finally decided to open shop on the island. The first store would be located at Bayamon's Plaza del Sol. About nine more stores were planned to open later. Best Buy's store in Plaza del Sol would be located right above the mall's 30,000 square foot Bed Bath & Beyond (BBB) box and would have more than 65 employees. This is in line with the plans the shopping mall's new owner at the time, Ohio-based Developers Diversified Realty (DDR), had reported. DDR said it could expand the mall vertically instead of horizontally to increase its value, as space to grow was limited. Besides adding a second story to BBB to house Best Buy, sources close to the mall said that up to three additional stories could be added to Plaza del Sol to provide more retail space. "Ever since it was first built, Plaza del Sol was designed with aggressive expansion in mind," said the source. In fact, before the sale to DDR, Plaza del Sol had already said it planned to add a multistory parking lot. The construction of Best Buy in Plaza del Sol was part of the retailer's 2005 plans to invest $700 million in property and equipment, and to open some 73 stores nationwide and in Canada. The Best Buy store was instead opened at Plaza Rio Hondo a few miles away in 2008.

=== 2010-present ===
In 2011, after the acquisition from DDR Corp. It was announced that during the next six years they would be redeveloping the mall to add more retail space and also to change the design it was given since it was first built. The mall added 35,500 sq ft (3,300 m^{2}), moving the food court upstairs and reusing the space below for new tenants. Phase two of Plaza Del Sol's redevelopment will include more parking spaces and the construction of approximately 137,000 square feet (12,700 m^{2}) of new GLA to accommodate the expansion of a key anchor as well as construction of additional junior anchor boxes.

In 2013, it was announced that the old food court would become a Victoria's Secret, Victoria's Secret Pink and Aeropostale.

In 2017, DDR Corp. spun off its Puerto Rican shopping centers to RVI (Retail Value Inc.) due to struggles they had after the Hurricane Maria, making Retail Value Inc. the new owner of the mall at the time.

In August 2021, Developers Diversified (DDR Corp.) came back to the PR retail landscape with a $550 million deal with RVI which Plaza del Sol was included in, making DDR the owner of the mall once again.

In September 2022, it was announced that Bed Bath & Beyond would be closing as part of a plan to close 150 stores nationwide.

On May 10, 2023, it was reported that Curzon Puerto Rico, an affiliate of Curzon Advisers, was now the owner of one of the largest shopping center portfolios in Puerto Rico, formerly owned by Developers Diversified (DDR Corp.) which had acquired it again in 2021. In this portfolio of 9 shopping centers, Plaza del Sol was included, making Curzon Puerto Rico the new owners of the mall.

On February 6, 2024, it was reported that Burlington would be replacing the space left by Bed Bath & Beyond at the mall, a store opening for the Burlington was scheduled for May 17.

In 2024, it was announced that AutoZone would be taking over the Pep Boys at the mall.

== Gallery ==
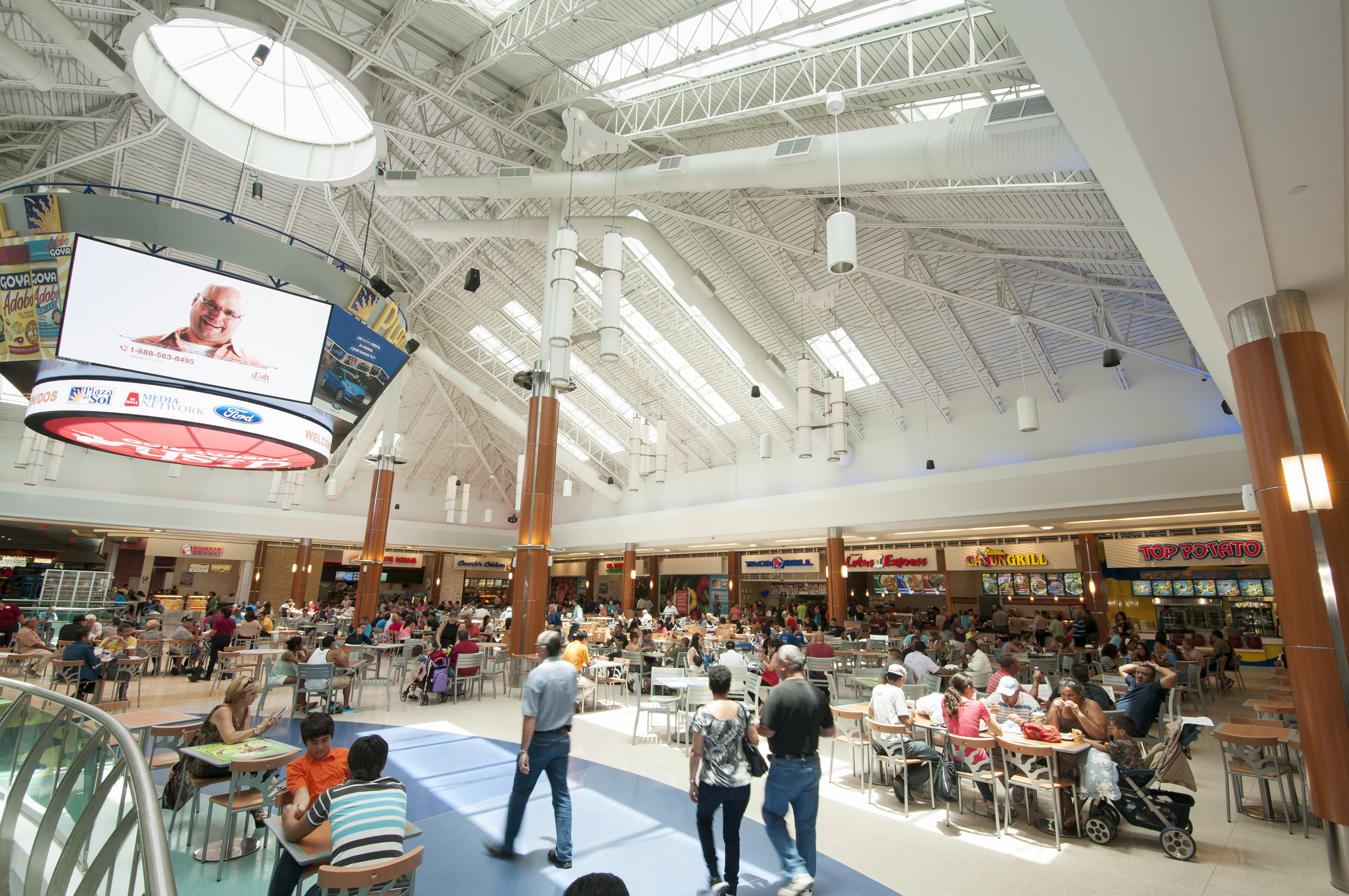
Plaza del Sol food court after renovations

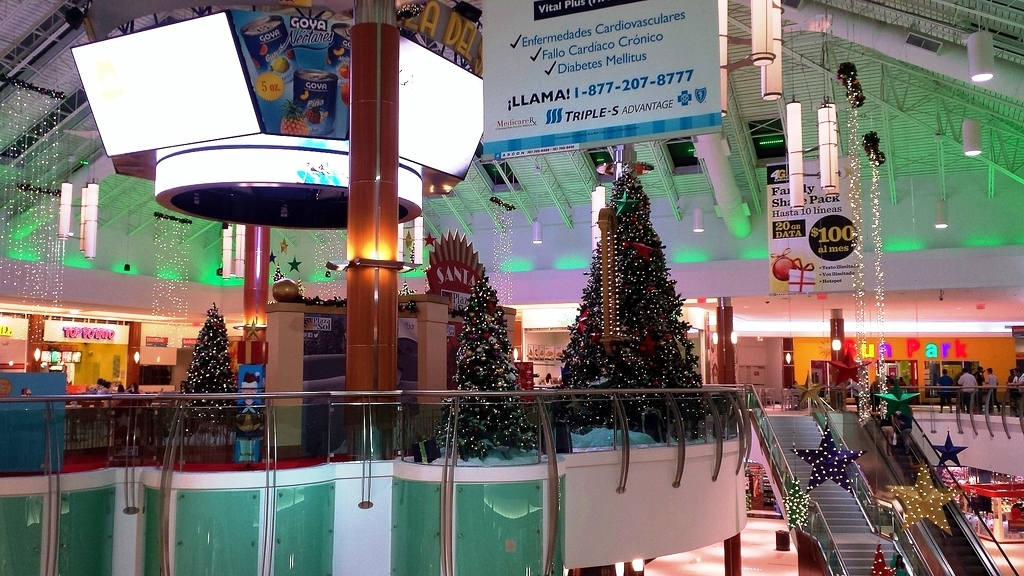
Escalators and Christmas Trees at Plaza del Sol
