= El Cantón Mall =

Shopping mall in Bayamón, Puerto Rico

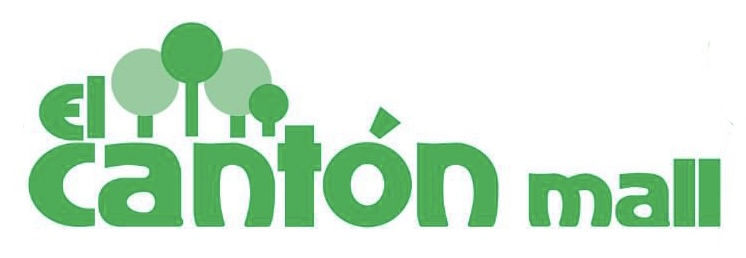
- Location: Bayamón, Puerto Rico
- Coordinates: 18°24′4″N 66°9′25″W
- Address: Puerto Rico / San Juan / Bayamón / Avenida Bobby Capó (PR-8855)
- Opened: 29 November 1980
- Developer: Comerciantes de Bayamón, Inc.
- Manager: Herederos Vidal Nadal, Inc.
- Owner: Herederos Vidal Nadal, Inc.
- Architect: Rexach Construction Company
- Num. of stores: 80+
- Num. of anchor tenants: 1
- Floor area: 275,294 sq ft (25,575.6 m^{2})
- Floors: 2
- Parking: 1,100
- Website: https://www.elcantonmall.com/

El Cantón Mall is an enclosed shopping mall in Bayamón, Puerto Rico. It houses stores such as Rent-A-Center, Rainbow, Grand Way, Donato, All Ways 99, Claro, T-Mobile, La Gloría, Me Salvé, and many others. The mall was formerly anchored by Tiendas Capri, which left in 2017 and was later replaced with government offices.

== History ==
=== Origins ===
In the late 1970s, a group of businesspeople from the Bayamón town center district approached Don Antonio V. Reyes for financing assistance to develop a shopping center. This marked the beginning of what would become El Cantón Mall. By the 1980s, under Reyes' leadership, the mall expanded, and 70 additional cuerdas of land next to it were acquired. (One cuerda is equivalent to 0.97 acres.) Under the leadership of a new generation, the mall's growth continued as its founders had envisioned, and it became a landmark in Bayamón.

=== Opening and success: 1980s ===
On October 26, 1980, it was reported that a group of merchants from Old Bayamón had come up with a successful response to the competition posed by the large shopping centers that had been developing on the outskirts of the city in those years. Their solution was a "commercial condominium," as it was called—an indoor shopping center of approximately 170,000 square feet, with spacious interior walkways and air conditioning. It was to be built on Betances Street, in the Cantón sector, adjacent to the traditional commercial area of the city center. The location was also close to public transportation stations, which maintained a vigorous daily flow of people from various points converging in the town.

The concept of a "commercial condominium" was based on the fact that the center was developed by a group of 20 merchants who, after the building's completion, would individually purchase spaces within the center for their businesses. Some of these merchants, after acquiring their premises, rented out portions of them, leading to the number of businesses occupying the center growing by about thirty percent at the time. "The idea of developing a joint project like this, between merchants in the area, arose about ten years ago," said Perfecto Massó, a businessman who presided over the corporation Comerciantes de Bayamón, Inc., which was created for the construction of El Cantón Mall. "It was during meetings at the local Chamber of Commerce, where we discussed alternatives to strengthen the historic commercial center of Bayamón," he added.

The property, about 12 acres in size, where El Cantón Mall is located was acquired by the merchants for around $1.7 million from the Garcia Comercial firm. The company had initially planned to develop the commercial complex and lease it. The construction of El Cantón Mall, together with the land acquisition, represented an investment of nearly $10 million, according to reports. The First Federal Savings & Loan Association provided most of the interim financing for the center’s construction, about $7 million, and would also finance approximately $4.5 million in long-term capital for around 20 merchants in the commercial condominium.

Once the center's construction was completed, the Comerciantes de Bayamón, Inc. corporation would dissolve, and the merchants would operate as condominium owners, though with a new firm hired to manage the center. The inauguration of El Cantón Mall had been tentatively scheduled for November 15 of that year, according to José Ramón Ramirez, merchant consultant for the project, which was being built by Rexach Construction Company. Ramirez described the project as an example for other towns on the island where the historic commercial areas had lost their prominence due to the rise of modern shopping centers in surrounding areas. He reported that El Cantón Mall would feature parking for approximately 1,000 vehicles.

The "condominium owners" properties ranged from 900 to 2,000 square feet, though some had already been subdivided for rental or sale to other merchants. Among the businesses that would operate at El Cantón Mall were Bayamón Federal Savings, a banking institution; B&B, a department store; Jorge Pica, a clothing and fabric store; Mary Ann Shop, women's clothing; La Gloría, shoes; a pharmacy owned by José Pérez Fonseca; and Madison Department Store, men's clothing. Additionally, Almacenes González (shoes), La Gloria (men's clothing), Lerner Shops (women's clothing), and Garcia Comercial (a hardware store) were also set to occupy the mall. The mall also planned to feature a section for small light food businesses, similar to La Terraza at Plaza Las Américas.

El Cantón Mall officially opened on November 29, 1980.

On December 11, 1980, B&B (Bonito y Barato) officially inaugurated its store at the shopping mall.

On May 5, 1985, it was reported that Tiendas Kress inaugurated its store at the shopping mall.

On November 22, 1989, it was reported that preparations for the Christmas season had begun, and El Cantón Mall was getting ready to celebrate in a big way. The shopping center offered its customers affordability, variety, and enjoyment. El Cantón Mall was designed to satisfy the tastes and needs of the Puerto Rican people. Its location, wide variety of stores, and low prices made it the ideal shopping destination. Among its many attractions were ample parking and constant surveillance by security guards.

On the first level, visitors could enjoy numerous specialized shops, as well as a terrace featuring eight fast food establishments. The mall offered discount stores, baby and infant items, clothing and footwear for men and women, jewelry, perfumes, and cosmetics. Other services and products available included musical instruments, a pharmacy, opticians, a hair salon, records, photographic equipment and development, furniture stores, and banking services.

On the second level, several government offices were located to serve clients, including ARPE, Telefónica, and the Sewer Authority and Social Services. To celebrate Christmas in a big way, El Cantón Mall extended its regular hours throughout December of that year.

=== Success: 2010s ===
On May 27, 2010, it was reported that for decades, El Cantón Mall had maintained one of the highest traffic rates per square foot among all the shopping centers in Puerto Rico. At the time, average weekday traffic for the mall was 25,000 visitors per day. Sally E. Ortiz, the mall administrator, when asked what had contributed to the mall’s ability to attract such a significant crowd, attributed it to the facility's diverse mix of retailers. This included a wide range of well-known department stores, clothing and accessory shops, beauty and jewelry boutiques, perfume stores, communications retailers, eateries, pet shops, furniture and electronics stores, pharmacies, health product stores, music stores, and various service and educational centers.

Ortiz explained that the mall primarily targeted the middle and low-middle economic classes, with most stores offering basic goods at low prices, which helped minimize the impact of the economic recession on the mall’s performance. She also mentioned that shoppers were drawn to the mall's safe and pleasant shopping environment. While other shopping centers with higher-priced merchants were seeing a decline in foot traffic due to the recession, El Cantón Mall had actually experienced an increase in visitors. With a gross leasable area of 206,335 square feet and more than 1,100 parking spaces, Ortiz noted that one of her administration's top priorities was ensuring the mall and its surroundings remained secure, making it a safe place to shop.

On January 31, 2013, it was reported that since its opening, El Cantón Mall had become a fixture, if not a landmark, of life in Bayamón and the surrounding region, maintaining one of the highest visitor traffic rates per square foot of all shopping centers in Puerto Rico. With the inauguration of the Puerto Rico Electric Power Authority’s (PREPA) commercial offices in the mall that year, the shopping center expected a substantial increase in daily visitors. PREPA's commercial offices would occupy about 13,000 square feet, with the opening date set for March 2013.

Located on Betances Street in Bayamón's commercial and historic center, El Cantón Mall had a leasable area of approximately 207,000 square feet, more than 1,200 parking spaces, and an average weekday traffic of 27,000 visitors. The mall maintained a vacancy rate of less than 2%. At that time, it boasted a roster of over 80 stores, including Rent-A-Center, Rainbow, 5-7-9, Foot Locker, Payless Shoe Source, Jeans.com, Capri, Kress, RadioShack, Me Salvé, Tiendas La Gloría, Always 99, as well as government service offices such as the U.S. Post Office, Demographic Registry, Puerto Rico Aqueduct & Sewer Authority, and PREPA. This diverse tenant mix contributed to the mall’s longevity and growth, offering a variety of experiences, products, and brands at very affordable prices, primarily targeting middle and low-income segments.

At the time, El Cantón Mall was managed by Herederos Vidal Nadal Inc. (HVN Inc.), a commercial real estate management company.

=== Renovations and success: 2020s, and on ===
On February 29, 2024, it was reported that after completing the remodeling of the interior and exterior of the shopping center at a cost of $8 million, El Cantón Mall would proceed with renovating its parking area, adding landscaping to the exterior of the property, and attracting new tenants in the coming months. These improvements would be carried out by Herederos Vidal Nadal Inc., the corporation that owns the mall.
