= Melville Corporation =

Defunct American retail holding corporation

- Company type: Public
- Traded as: NYSE: MES (1922-1996)
- Industry: Retail holding company
- Predecessor: Melville Shoe Corporation
- Founded: 1922; 104 years ago
- Founder: Ward Melville
- Defunct: 1996; 30 years ago
- Fate: Sold all non-healthcare assets and rebranded into the CVS Health Corporation
- Successor: CVS Health Corporation
- Headquarters: Rye, New York, United States
- Number of locations: 7,282 (at its peak)
- Subsidiaries: See Divisions

Melville Corporation was a large retail holding company incorporated by Ward Melville in 1922 from Melville Shoe Company. Formerly based in Rye, New York, it became CVS Corporation in 1996 under a massive reorganization plan. The company traded on the New York Stock Exchange (NYSE) under the ticker MES, before changing its ticker to CVS.

At its peak, Melville operated over 7,282 retail stores in approximately 3,500 unique locations, providing a wide range of products.

== History ==
=== Melville Shoe Company ===
The modern Melville Corporation began in 1892, when Frank Melville, a wholesaler, took over three stores in New York that hadn't paid him for his shipments. Melville brought his son, John Ward Melville, into the family business in 1909. By 1916, he was named vice president.

Melville befriended J. Franklin McElwain while serving in the army during World War I. The two devised a method for mass producing shoes and selling them at affordable prices. The J. F. McElwain Company manufactured the shoes and Melville Shoe sold them. They opened the first Thom McAn store in New York on Third Avenue and 14th Street on Oct. 14, 1922. By the end of the year, seven stores had opened and Melville Shoe was incorporated. By 1927, there were 370 stores in the chain.

From 1925 to 1928, the number of Melville stores increased by 184% and net income expanded 360%. Melville Shoe Company was first listed on the New York Stock Exchange in September 1928. In the first three months of 1929 the chain store realized a 34% increase in sales over 1928. In February 1930 the Melville Shoe Corporation controlled 460 Thom McAn, Rival, and John Ward stores in 39 states. Melville was named company president in 1930. By 1939, there were 650 Thom McAn stores. The company also had the John Ward and Frank Tod chains. Melville and McElwain merged that year.

Though the company struggled during the Great Depression, it saw significant growth from 1940 to 1952. That year, Melville acquired the 151-store Miles Shoes chain. By 1955, it had 850 stores and 12 factories. In 1956, Ward Melville became chairman until his death in 1977. He remained chief executive and Robert C. Erb was named president. After Melville moved to the board room, the company revitalized its operations by targeting younger customers and moving stores to the suburbs.

In 1960, Melville launched Meldisco, a new division that leased family shoe departments in discount department stores. Francis C. Rooney Jr. was named president and chief executive in 1964. Under his leadership, and advisement from Peter Drucker, the company transitioned into a specialty merchandiser. This process started in 1968 with the founding of Chess King, a men's clothing store in Dedham, Massachusetts. Melville then bought the Foxwood women's clothing stores, based in Pittsburgh, and renamed it Foxmoor. In 1969, Melville bought Consumer Value Stores, a 40-store drug chain with $20 million in sales. It also acquired the California-based Country Casuals chain that year and merged its 15 stores with Foxmoor.

In April 1970, it acquired Miller Shoes, a women's shoe manufacturer. By the end of 1970, the company owned 1,918 stores, 17 shoe factories, and two supplier plants. Thom McAn operated 924 stores in the US, Canada, and Puerto Rico. Meldisco expanded to 435 stores. Foxmoor had 97 stores, Chess Kings had 75, and Consumer Value Stores had 100. The headquarters for Meldisco and Miles, its women's footwear division, were moved from New York to Hackensack, New Jersey. 1971 saw the company opened Melco, a new subsidiary that mostly sold its own name brand shoes. By the end of the year, there were 6 stores on Long Island, three in New Jersey, and three in D.C. In 1972, the company acquired 80 Clinton Drug and Discount stores located in the Midwest and Northeast, merging them with CVS. It also bought clothing manufacturers Metro Pants Company and Spotwood Apparel, and moved its corporate headquarters from New York City to Westchester. In April 1976, Melville acquired Marshalls, a chain of 32 specialty stores, based in New England, for $40 million.

=== Melville Corporation ===
Reflecting the company's focus on diversifying, it officially dropped shoe from the name, becoming Melville Corporation in June 1976. It acquired Mark Drug in 1977, merging all 36 stores into CVS. With the death of Ward Melville in June, Rooney was named chairman. After this, the company began to de-emphasize its shoe business. Melville acquired the Kay Bee Toy chain in 1981 and bought Wilson's House of Leather the following year. By 1982, the company was operating 1,200 Thom McAn shoe stores, supplied and operated more than 1,900 shoe departments in Kmart, 470 Chess Kings stores, 508 Foxmoor stores, 433 CVS stores, 180 Marshalls stores, 210 Kay Bee toy stores, 72 Wilson stores. Throughout this period of growth, Melville maintained a lean management team of only seven executives and a support staff of 75 employees. In 1983, the company purchased Linens 'n Things, which had 55 stores with annual sales of $80 million at the time. It also closed six of the company's seven shoe factories. It sold off the Foxmoor chain in 1985.

When Rooney retired in 1987, Stanley P. Goldstein, a co-founder of CVS, replaced him as chief executive and chairman. Goldstein maintained Rooney's strategy for growth by purchasing 25 Heartland and Pharmacity drugstores that year, and 36 Leather Loft stores. In 1988, he also purchased athletic footwear brand Finish Line and Bermans Specialty Stores.

In July 1990, Melville purchased 330 Circus World stores from Greenman Brothers for $95 million. The stores became part of its Kay-Bee division, which had 770 toy stores in 50 states at the time. It acquired Peoples Drug for $300 million in June 1990 and merged it with CVS. In 1991, the company purchased 128 FootAction stores.

=== Restructuring and break up ===
Beginning in the early 1990s, Melville was under pressure to reorganize and shed its diverse portfolio. Many of the chains the company operated were underperforming. In 1992, the company announced plans for a significant restructuring, where 800 stores would be closed, including 390 of the 730 Thom McAn locations, 240 Kay Bee shops, and 75 Linen 'n Things stores. Its CVS division also exited the state of California by selling 85 stores to American Stores. In 1993, Chess King was sold to Merry-Go-Round and Accessory Lady was sold to Woolworth. Harvey Rosenthal, president and chief executive of the company's CVS drugstore unit, was named president and chief operating officer of Melville at the beginning of 1994.

In October 1995, Melville made its first big move as part of a review of its operations, selling Marshalls to TJX Companies for $550 million. Days later, the company finally unveiled its plan to split into multiple companies. Melville would retain CVS, Linen 'n Things, and Bob's Stores, while FootAction, Thom McAn, and Meldisco were spun off as a new shoe company, later named Footstar. As part of this process, all Thom McAn stores were either converted to FootAction name or closed. Kay-Bee was to be spun off as separate company, but was ultimately sold to Consolidated Stores for $315 million in March 1996. The company's Wilson division was sold to its management team in May. In June, the company sold its This End Up furniture chain to an investor group. Melville officially changed its name to CVS Corporation and began trading under its new name that fall. In November, the company spun off Linen 'n Things though an IPO. In November 1997, CVS sold Bob's Stores, its final non-drugstore asset.

== Divisions ==
During the height of Melville's success, the company operated the following retailing divisions.

=== Pharmacies ===
- CVS Pharmacy
- Peoples Drug
- Standard Drug
- Austin Drug
- Freddy's Drug

=== Apparel ===
- Marshalls (sold to T.J. Maxx in 1995)
- Wilsons The Leather Experts
- Bermans
- Pelle Cuir
- Tannery West
- Snyder Leather Outlets
- Georgetown Leather Design
- Bob's Stores
- Accessory Lady
- Chess King (sold to Merry-Go-Round in 1993; defunct as of 1995)
- Chess King Garage
- Foxmoor (sold in 1985; purchased by Edison Brothers Stores in 1990; closed in Edison Brothers liquidation in 1999)
- Free Fall
- Putnam Stores

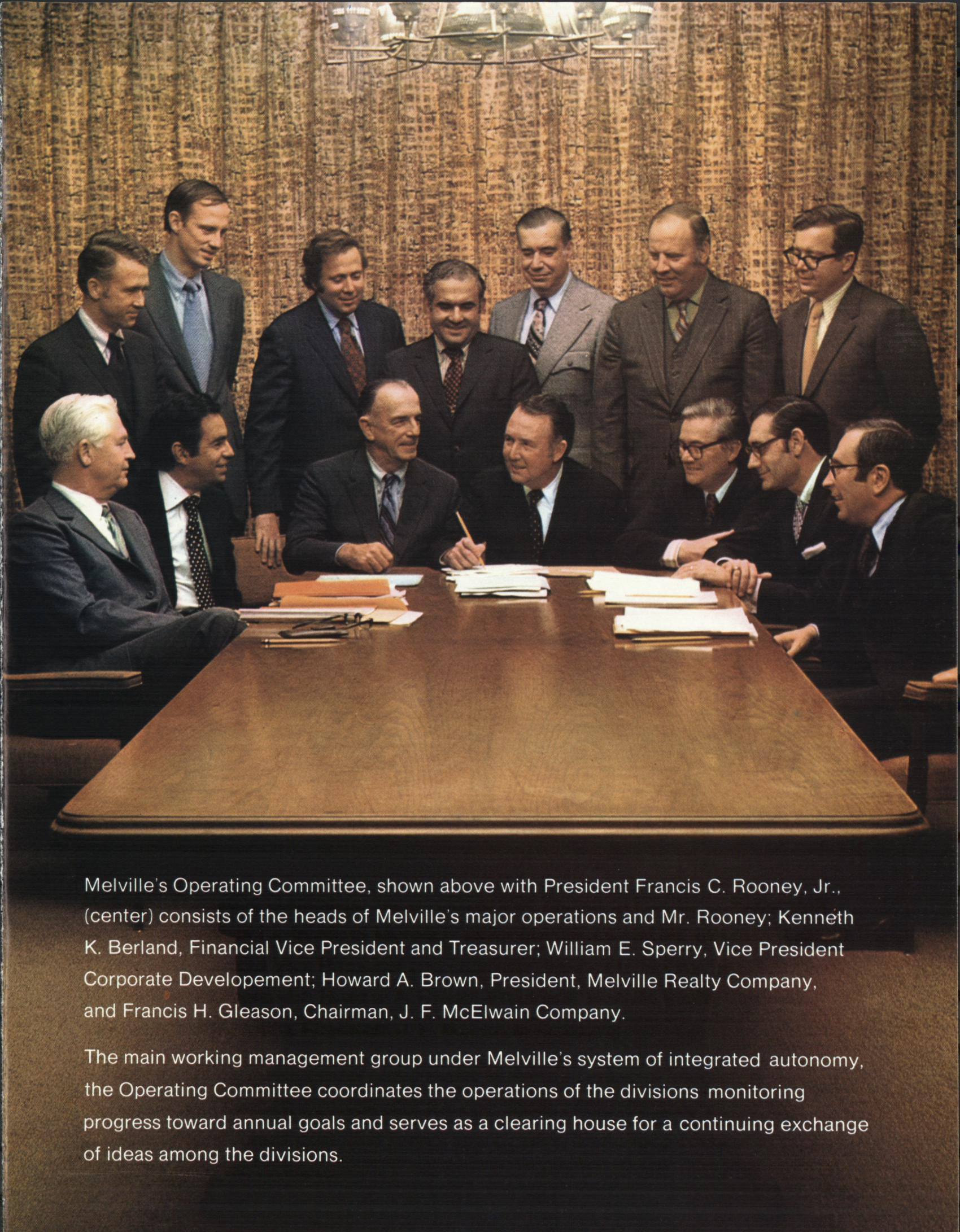
Melville executives in 1971

=== Footwear ===
- FootAction USA (spun off as Footstar Inc., now owned by Foot Locker)
- FootAction For Kids
- Fan Club
- Thom McAn (was part of Footstar spinoff, now owned by Sears)
- B.O.Q.
- Miles
- Open Country
- Smart Step
- Vanguard
- Meldisco
- Woodbridge Shoes

=== Toys ===
- KB Toys (sold to Consolidated Stores in 1996, defunct as of 2010, reviving in 2018)
- Circus World
- K & K Toys
- Toy Works (defunct)
- Play Things

=== Domestics ===
- Linens 'n Things (liquidated in 2008; revived as online retail in 2009)
- Prints Plus

=== Furniture ===
- This End Up
- Wood's End
- Prism
