= Francis Charles Rooney Jr. =

American business executive

Francis Charles Rooney Jr. (November 24, 1921 – December 2014) was an American business executive who was chief executive of the Melville Corporation and oversaw its transformation from a footwear company into a retail corporation that included CVS, Thom McAn, and Marshall's.

== Early life ==
Francis Charles Rooney Jr. was born in North Brookfield, Massachusetts. He graduated from the Wharton School at the University of Pennsylvania with a bachelor's degree in 1943.

== Career ==
During World War II, Rooney served as an ensign in the U.S. Naval Reserve. He was a gunnery officer on the battleship USS North Carolina in the Pacific Theater from 1943 to 1945 and participated in ten major engagements.

In 1946, Rooney began his career at the John Foote Shoe Company. He joined Thom McAn in 1953, became its president in 1961, and was appointed chief executive of its parent company, Melville Corporation, in 1964. During his tenure as CEO, Melville acquired Marshall's, CVS, Kay-Bee Toys, and Linens 'n Things. He retired from Melville in 1987. The company was renamed CVS Corporation in 1996.

Rooney became CEO of the H. H. Brown Shoe Company in 1990. In 1991, the company was acquired by Berkshire Hathaway. In a shareholder letter that year, Berkshire CEO Warren E. Buffett described Rooney as a "business artist."

Rooney was a founding trustee of the Inner-City Scholarship Fund in New York City. He was on the corporate boards of Bankers Trust, Black & Decker, Neiman Marcus, and Dunkin' Donuts. He was also a trustee for institutions including the Smithsonian Institution, the Boys and Girls Clubs of America, and Fordham University.

== Personal life ==
Rooney was married to Frances Heffernan and had eight children. He died of pneumonia at Greenwich Hospital, where he had been a trustee, at the age of 93.
