= Wolstein =

Wolstein may refer to:

== People ==
- Bert Wolstein (1927—2004), American real estate developer

== Places ==
- Wolstein Center, American auditorium
