= Footstar =

American shoe retailer

Footstar, Inc.
- Type: Public
- Founded: 1996
- Headquarters: Mahwah, New Jersey, U.S.
- Number of employees: 1,398 (2005)

Footstar, Inc., was a shoe retailer that was headquartered in Mahwah, New Jersey. The company was traded under the symbol “FTAR” on the Pink Sheets. In April 2012, Footstar was merged into Xstelos Holdings, Inc.

== History ==
Footstar was spun off from the Melville Corporation in 1996 as part of that corporation's reorganization of all of its operating divisions including Marshalls, KB Toys, This End Up, and Linens 'n Things. After the spinoff and/or sale of all of its divisions other than CVS Pharmacy, Melville changed its name to CVS Corporation and relocated its headquarters to Woonsocket, Rhode Island. Footstar originally consisted of three former Melville divisions: family footwear retailer Thom McAn, athletic shoe retailer FootAction USA, and Meldisco, which operated footwear departments inside department and discount stores, primarily Kmart. After closing down its Thom McAn division, Footstar retained its rights to the Thom McAn shoe brand. The Thom McAn brand and the Kmart footwear departments are now owned and operated by Sears Brands, LLC. In 2000, Footstar acquired the shoe retailer Just For Feet, which had filed for bankruptcy.

== Financial difficulties ==
The company entered Chapter 11 bankruptcy in March 2004, during which the Just for Feet chain was shut down and FootAction USA was sold to Foot Locker Inc. Footstar emerged from bankruptcy on February 6, 2006.

Under a July 2005 agreement with Kmart owner Sears Holdings, Footstar agreed to continue operating stores within Kmart until December 31, 2008, at which point Footstar was to sell the remaining inventory to Kmart at book value. In April 2008, Sears Holdings agreed to obtain Footstar's intellectual property, including the Thom McAn brand name.

== Pharmaceutical acquisition ==
In January 2011, Footstar announced that it was acquiring CPEX Pharmaceuticals Inc. The acquisition was made through FCB I Acquisition Corp., a wholly owned subsidiary of FCB I Holdings Inc., which was owned 80.5% by Footstar Corporation and 19.5% by an unaffiliated investment holding company.
