= Donald Kaufman =

Donald Kaufman may refer to:

- Donald Kaufman (collector) (1930–2009), American toy collector
- Donald Bruce Kaufman, co-founder of homebuilding firm Kaufman & Broad (now KB Home)
- Donald Kaufman, fictional character in the 2002 film Adaptation
