= Harvey Rosenthal =

American businessman

Harvey Rosenthal is an American businessman who served as president and CEO of CVS Health, following Stanley P. Goldstein and followed by Thomas Ryan. He later became president and chief operating officer of Melville Corporation.

== Education ==
Rosenthal graduated from Newton High School in Newton, Massachusetts, in 1960. He received an AB in mathematics from Harvard College in 1964, and an MBA from Harvard Business School in 1969.

== Career ==
Rosenthal joined CVS in 1969, when the chain had fewer than 100 stores and was known as Consumer Value Stores. By 1984 he had become senior vice-president of marketing, and in 1985 was named president. During his 10 years as president, the company grew 350 percent to $4 billion in revenue. From 1992 to 1993 Rosenthal served as chairman of the board of the National Association of Chain Drug Stores (NACDS). Also in 1993, he was awarded an honorary doctor of science in pharmacy from Massachusetts College of Pharmacy and Health Sciences.

In 1994, Rosenthal became president and COO of Melville Corporation, the publicly owned parent company of CVS/pharmacy and other retail chains, and a member of its board of directors. In 1996, he retired from Melville. From 1997 to 2012 he served as a director at LoJack, and served as a director/trustee at EQ Advisor Trust/AXA Funds from 1997 to 2016. He is a trustee of the Dana–Farber Cancer Institute and a member of the overseer advisory board at Boston public television station WGBH.

== Personal ==
Rosenthal is married to the photographer Andrea Rosenthal. They have two children.
