= Merry-Go-Round (retailer) =

Defunct American clothing retailer

- Type: Public
- Industry: Retail
- Founded: 1968; 58 years ago
- Founder: Leonard Weinglass; Harold Goldsmith
- Defunct: 1996; 30 years ago
- Fate: Bankruptcy liquidation
- Headquarters: Joppa, Maryland, United States
- Number of locations: 536 stores (1996)
- Area served: North America
- Products: Clothing
- Parent: Merry-Go-Round Enterprises, Inc.

Merry-Go-Round was an American clothing retail chain owned by Merry-Go-Round Enterprises, Inc., that thrived from the 1970s through the early 1990s. The chain fell into bankruptcy during the mid-1990s, and eventually ceased operation in 1996. It was famous for its ability to profit from short-lived fashion fads and also owned men's clothing retailers Silverman's, by purchasing 273 stores from Retail Ventures, Inc. (RVI), parent of American Eagle Outfitters, in 1989. In May 1993, it purchased the Chess King clothing chain from the Melville Corporation. It filed for Chapter 11 bankruptcy in 1994 and began liquidation sales by February 1996. At its peak, the company operated just over 500 locations, primarily in enclosed malls.

Their mid-1980s commercials parodied Quiet Riot's "Cum On Feel the Noize", with teens and young adults walking down a hallway with massive sized speakers blaring the song.

Merry-Go-Round's unsuccessful reorganization led to the 1998 lawsuit Devan v. Ernst & Young LLP against Ernst & Young for violating the standard of care as turnaround advisor. The case resulted in the largest single defendant settlement in Maryland history.

In 2026, the trademark and brand rights to Merry-Go-Round were acquired by Contonia Lee Wright, who initiated a revival of the brand in 2026, blending its nostalgic heritage with modern fashion trends. The revival operations are based in Knoxville, Tennessee
