= Foxmoor Casuals =

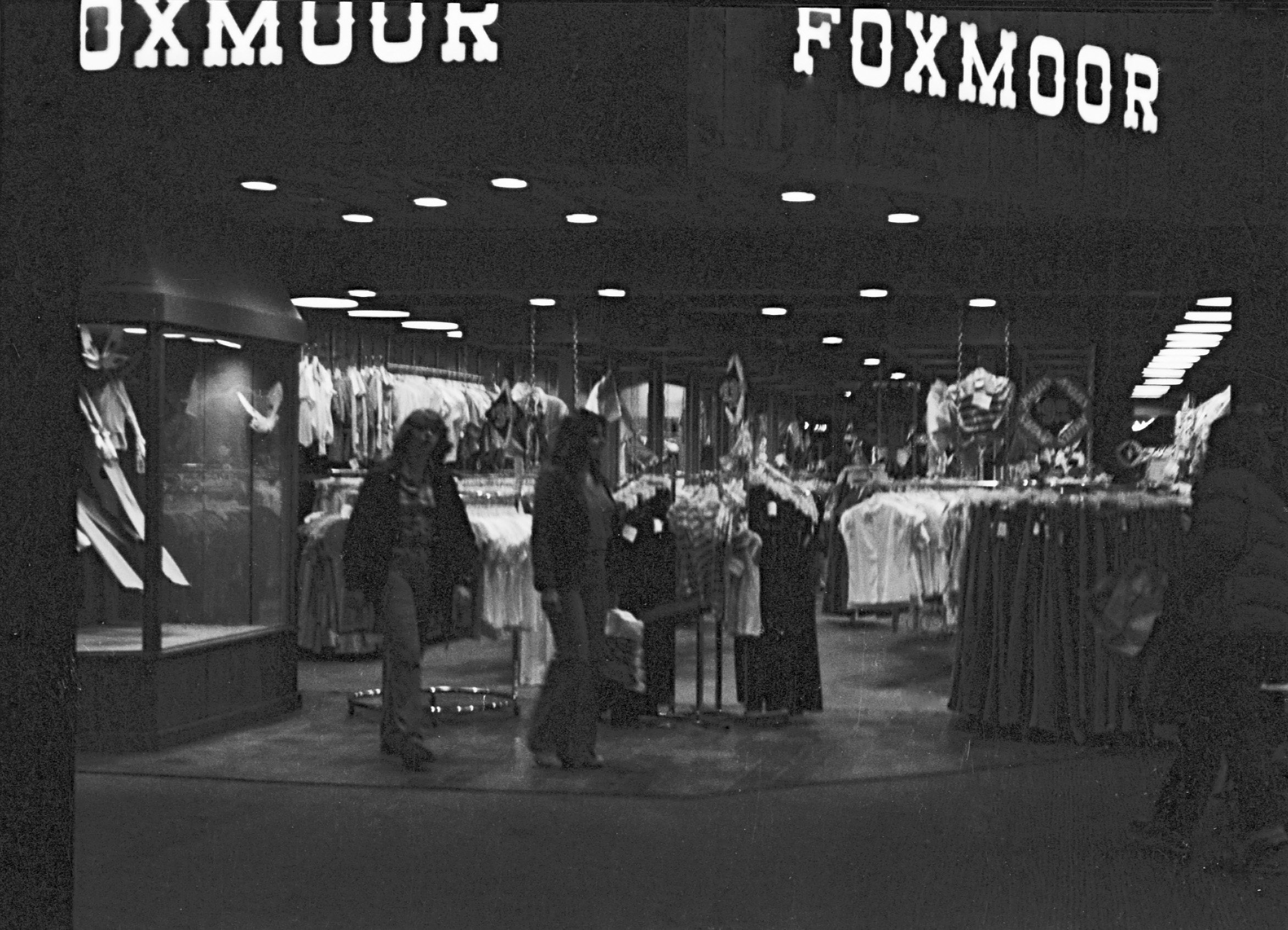
- Foxmoor Casuals store inside South Shore Mall, Bay Shore, NY 1979
- Formerly: Foxwood Casuals
- Industry: Women's Fashion
- Founded: 1963
- Defunct: 1991
- Fate: Bankruptcy and Liquidation
- Successor: Edison Brothers Stores
- Headquarters: Pittsburgh, Pennsylvania
- Number of locations: 588 (1982); 614 (1984)
- Parent: Melville Shoe Corporation (1968-1984) Dylex Limited (1984-1990) Edison Brothers (1990-1999)

Foxmoor Casuals (founded as Foxwood Casuals) was a chain of mall-based women's clothing stores in the US, from 1963 until 1990.

== History ==
Foxwood Casuals was founded in 1963, in Pittsburgh, Pennsylvania. The then 16-store chain was acquired by the Melville Corporation in late 1968. By 1982, the chain had expanded greatly to a total of 588 stores with sales of $196 million (~$537 million in 2024), now renamed to Foxmoor Casuals. In 1984, the chain was sold to the Canadian-based Dylex Limited who paid $49 million (CAD) for the then 614-unit chain. In January 1990, the chain, operated through Dylex subsidiary Foxmoor Specialty Stores Corp., filed for Chapter 11 bankruptcy, selling 225 stores to the Edison Brothers conglomerate and liquidating the remaining stores. The 225 stores bought by Edison Brothers were quickly converted to other nameplates that year.

The store was famously featured in the Monroeville, Pennsylvania shopping center, the Monroeville Mall, in George A. Romero's 1978 zombie apocalypse film Dawn of the Dead.
