= Afterthoughts (retailer) =

American accessory store chain

- Type: Subsidiary
- Industry: Retail
- Founded: c. 1980s
- Founder: F.W. Woolworth Company
- Defunct: 2002
- Fate: Acquired by Claire's and merged into The Icing
- Successor: The Icing
- Number of locations: 809 (1996); 768 (1999)
- Products: Jewelry and accessories
- Parent: F.W. Woolworth Company (1980s-1998); Venator Group (1998-1999); Claire's Stores, Inc (1999-2002)

Afterthoughts (occasionally stylized as After Thoughts) was an American chain of accessory and jewelry stores in the United States that operated from the 1980s until 2002. It provided fashion jewelry and accessories targeted primarily at teens and young women. It was acquired by its major competitor Claire's in late 1999 and the Afterthoughts brand was dropped in 2002.

== History ==
=== Woolworth's/Venator Group ===
Then stylized as After Thoughts, the chain was created as one of the many specialty store subsidiaries of F. W. Woolworth Company (later Venator Group) in the 1980s. By 1996, the chain had grown to a total of 809 stores, and grew further that year with the Venator Group's merger of 109 Accessory Lady stores, previously bought from Melville Corporation in 1993, into their various formats, including Afterthoughts.

=== Claire's Stores, Inc. ===
The chain, then reduced to 768 stores, was acquired by major competitor Claire's in late 1999, as the Venator Group began selling off or closing many of its specialty store chains to focus on Champs Sporting Goods and Foot Locker. As stated in their 2000 annual report, Claire's at the time planned to convert their stores under The Icing name to Afterthoughts, as they targeted the same market, and Afterthoughts had higher sales and margins at the time.

In first-quarter 2000, Claire's announced that they were closing a total of 300 stores- 100 Claire's, and 200 Afterthoughts, in malls that could not support multiple stores. Despite previously announced plans, by February 2, 2002, the Afterthoughts brand had been consolidated into Claire's existing The Icing brand, following a tumultuous 2001 fiscal year.
