= Just For Feet =

Defunct American shoe and sportswear chain store

Just for Feet Inc.
- Type: Sports equipment
- Industry: Retail
- Founded: 1977
- Defunct: 2004
- Headquarters: Birmingham, Alabama
- Products: Athletic Shoes and Sportswear
- Revenue: $775 million USD (1998)
- Website: www.feet.com (archived)

Just For Feet Inc. was an athletic shoe and sportswear retail store chain headquartered in Birmingham, Alabama which became one of the largest and fastest growing athletic stores in the United States. In 2000, Footstar acquired Just For Feet. It closed its last store in 2004.

== History ==
Just for Feet Inc. began with a single store at Century Plaza in Birmingham, Alabama, in 1977. Just For Feet operated over 140 superstores in 25 U.S. states and Puerto Rico by 1999. Most of the Just For Feet stores were located on outparcels adjoining major malls in cities, primarily in the Southeast, Midwest and Southwest.

=== Just For Feet Superstore ===
The first Just For Feet superstore opened adjacent to the Riverchase Galleria in 1987. Several features helped to distinguish Just for Feet from its competitors, including:

- A small basketball court, either inside the store or in a fenced courtyard outside.
- A large bank of video monitors located near the front of the store, where customers could watch live sporting events
- Loud rock and dance music pumped into the store
- A repeat customer program which enabled customers to receive a free pair of shoes after the purchase of 12 pairs
- An in-store fast-food snack bar featuring Chicago-style hot dogs and popcorn
- A complete selection of footwear styles from virtually every major athletic shoe supplier, as well as casual footwear from companies such as Rockport, Keds, Tretorn and Timberland
- A large selection of clearance footwear, called the "Combat Zone" and located at the front of the store, where value-oriented customers could purchase discontinued styles of shoes, often as low as $9.99 or $19.99
- Vendor concept shops, where customers could examine the complete footwear line of vendors such as Nike, Reebok, New Balance, Converse and Adidas. In many cases, the concept shops also featured active wear such as shorts, T-shirts and warm-up suits from those vendors
- "Moonlight Madness" sales, usually conducted around Christmas, where the store would be open extended hours (usually open until 4:00 a.m.) and offer customers outstanding bargains
- In-store appearances by professional athletes, including Michael Jordan, Björn Borg, Kareem Abdul-Jabbar, Herschel Walker and Shaquille O'Neal

=== Growth in the 1990s ===
In 1992, a store was opened at The Forum Shops at Caesars in Las Vegas, Nevada. Prior to becoming a publicly traded company in 1994, other company-owned stores were opened near Nashville, Tennessee, and in Kansas City, Missouri. Franchises were granted for stores that opened in San Antonio, Texas, suburban Atlanta, Georgia, and Columbus, Ohio; the Texas and Georgia stores subsequently became company-owned locations. By the end of 1996, Just For Feet operated superstores in eleven states.

In 1997, Just For Feet bought Florida-based Athletic Attic and Michigan-based Imperial Sports, enabling the company to enter numerous markets (and several states) where it previously had no presence. The 1998 acquisition of New Jersey–based Sneaker Stadium, and the subsequent conversion of those stores to the Just For Feet nameplate, enabled the company to expand into the metropolitan areas of Boston, Norfolk, New York, Philadelphia and Washington, D.C. These acquisitions enabled the company to become the second largest athletic footwear retailer near the end of the 20th century. One of the slogans the store used to position itself was "The World's Largest Athletic Shoe Store". The store was also famous for their promotion of buying any 12 pair of shoes, and then getting one pair for free, in the process, hence the other slogan, "Where Your 13th Pair is Free!"

== Marketing ==
In 1999, Just For Feet broadcast a commercial during Super Bowl XXXIII, produced by the agency Saatchi & Saatchi. In the spot, a group of Caucasian men in a humvee are seen tracking down a barefoot Kenyan runner, sedating him with drug-laced water, and forcing Nike shoes on his feet while he is unconscious. When the runner wakes up, he rejects the shoes and attempts to shake them off whilst running away.

The ad was widely criticized by the media and advertising industry for its derogatory content; Stuart Elliot, advertising columnist for The New York Times, called it "appallingly insensitive", while Advertising Age columnist Bob Garfield described the commercial as being "neo-colonialist", "culturally imperialist", and "probably racist". Just For Feet later sued Saatchi & Saatchi for malpractice over the spot, seeking $10 million in damages. Just For Feet alleged that they had relied on the expertise of the agency against their initial negative reactions to the spot, which ran contrary to the company's values and damaged its reputation. However, in the midst of Just For Feet's bankruptcy, the lawsuit was dropped.

== Bankruptcy and acquisition ==
In November 1999, Just For Feet filed for Chapter 11 bankruptcy protection, and in February 2000, the company was forced into Chapter 7. Footstar, Inc., at that time the parent company of Footaction USA, purchased the Just For Feet name and the leases of over 70 of its stores in February 2000. Those stores that remained opened continued to do business under the Just For Feet name until Footstar itself filed for Chapter 11 protection in 2004. That same year, the last of the Just For Feet stores closed.

According to The Wall Street Journal (April 23, 2007): 'Just for Feet collapsed in 1999 amid an accounting fraud. Three former executives pleaded guilty to crimes related to a scheme to overstate earnings by $8 million between 1996 and 1998. The bankruptcy judge appointed a trustee to recover money for the company's creditors. The estate of Harold Ruttenberg, Just for Feet's founder and former chief executive, agreed in August 2006 to pay $15 million ($23 million in 2025). Unfortunately for the estate, six months later, a Delaware Court in the case of North American Catholic Educational Programming Foundation Inc. against three directors of the Delaware corporation, Clearwire Holdings Inc., ruled that creditors and trustees of Delaware corporations that are insolvent or in the so-called "zone of insolvency", like Just for Feet, Inc. was, have no right to assert direct claims for breach of fiduciary duty against its directors.

The elder Ruttenberg died in 2005 at 63. Just for Feet's auditor, Deloitte & Touche agreed to pay $24 million, and in April 2007 five former outside directors agreed to pay $41.5 million – one of only 13 cases in the past 25 years where outside directors of public companies have made out-of-pocket payments and one of the largest ever settlements. (Enron Corporation's 10 directors paid only $13 million). In all, the trustees recovered roughly $80 million for the company's creditors.

Today, the company's former corporate headquarters is occupied by Jack Henry & Associates.
