= Chess King =

American men's clothing retailer

- Industry: Clothing
- Founded: 1968; 58 years ago
- Defunct: November 14, 1995; 30 years ago
- Fate: Bankruptcy
- Headquarters: United States
- Parent: Merry Go Round Enterprises (MGRE)

Chess King was an American men's clothing retailer created by the Melville Corporation. From its founding in 1968, it grew to over 500 locations by the mid-1980s, before an eventual decline, sale, and closure of the chain in 1995.

== History ==
In 1967, traveling salespeople from Melville's Thom McAn shoe business noted a "wide open market" for young men's clothing, which gave birth to the idea of starting a young men's clothing and shoe store. Market research reportedly found that chess and auto racing were popular interests of young men.

The first Chess King branch opened in the Dedham Mall in Dedham, Massachusetts (just outside Boston), in March 1968. In 1970, The New York Times described the store's concept as "teen-male apparel dress shops whose stores are highly identifiable, with bold coloring and designs aimed at appealing to the 12-to-20 male market." Five additional locations were opened in 1968, and 21 more in 1969. By late 1972, it had already grown to about 150 locations. By 1978, it had 300 locations. And by 1984, it had grown to over 500 stores.

Chess King also experimented with three spin-off specialty stores in the late 1980s and early 1990s. The first, named "FreeFall", carried designer labels for men and women and was geared toward higher-end, designer, brand names. The second, named "The B Club", carried activewear for both men and women. The third, named "Garage", had a 1950s inspired decor along with a Nash Metropolitan automobile in most locations. The retailer was successful through the 1980s as a purveyor of wild 1980s fads and fashion, but changing fashion trends contributed to the chain falling on hard times at the beginning of the 1990s.

Melville agreed to sell Chess King in March 1993 to Maryland-based Merry Go Round Enterprises (MGRE), with the sale being finalized in May of that year. In January 1994, MGRE filed for Chapter 11 bankruptcy. In November 1995, the Chess King chain closed.
