= Circus World (store) =

American toy store chain

- Formerly: Child's World (1964–70)
- Company type: Subsidiary
- Industry: Retail
- Founded: 1964 in Michigan
- Founder: Sidney Rubin
- Defunct: After 1996
- Headquarters: Michigan
- Number of locations: 330 stores (1990)
- Area served: United States
- Products: Toys
- Parent: Gilbert Companies Inc. (1969); Rite Aid (1982–85); Greenman Brothers (1985–90); Melville Corporation (1990)

Circus World (originally Child's World) was a toy store chain started and operated by Sidney Rubin. The company was purchased and operated by Rite Aid beginning in 1982, and was later bought by Melville Corporation in 1990, when some of its stores were converted to Kay-Bee Toys.

== History ==
Circus World, originally known as Child's World, was founded in Michigan in 1964, by engineer Sidney Rubin (born 1937), who served as the company president. Rubin was once a first baseman, and also worked as an army radar instructor before working as a systems analyst for Sperry Rand during the mid-1960s. Wanting to start a business in Detroit, Rubin realized that Michigan was ranked fourth in the United States in terms of youth population under 17 years of age. Rubin chose to begin a toy store company and began securing locations, followed by financial backing. The first store opened in 1964, in Warren, Michigan.

Gilbert Companies Inc. (formerly Gilbert Shoe Stores Inc.), based in Columbus, Ohio, purchased Child's World in November 1969. In 1970, the chain was renamed as Circus World. In 1971, the company relocated its corporate headquarters from Lathrup Village to Oak Park, Michigan. As of 1981, Circus World Toy Stores was based in Taylor, Michigan, and operated 127 stores located in 22 states, with 18 locations in Michigan. Stores averaged 3,500 sq ft (330 m^{2}), and Rubin stated that Circus World was the largest privately owned toy-specialty chain in the United States. In 1982, Rubin sold the company to Rite Aid, which planned to finance an expansion of the toy chain, while Rubin would remain in charge of it.

Circus World was purchased by the Greenman Brothers in 1985. Owners of the Playland chain of toy stores at the time, they converted them to Circus World stores. By the end of 1985, they managed to increase sales substantially through renovating stores and improving operations. Despite the apparent turnaround and record sales, however, the operational improvements envisioned by Bernard Greenman did not come quickly enough, and in 1987 Circus World had lost $3 million for the fiscal year. The next year, same-store sales had become stagnant, and the company lost another $3 million.

The stores were also run in the same manner as the Rite Aid drug stores, forcing the managers to spend much more office time than was needed, and less time on the floor selling to customers and maintaining inventory. Because there were many more Circus World stores than Playland, Greenman Brothers forced all stores to adopt the more complex Circus World methods rather than the simpler Playland system. The money Greenman Brothers were forced to pay out to upgrade the Circus World stores after paying to purchase the chain, plus the money they lost liquidating unsaleable merchandise, resulted in less operating capital to purchase merchandise for the 1986 Christmas selling season.

Although the chain would become profitable again by 1990, it had failed to differentiate itself from competitor Kay-Bee Toys, and Greenman management decided to sell the chain. In July 1990, Melville Corporation announced plans to purchase Circus World's 330 stores in 32 states for $95 million (~$201 million in 2024); the locations were to become part of Melville's Kay-Bee division. The sale was completed in August 1990, and some Circus World stores were subsequently renamed as Kay-Bee stores, while others retained the Circus World name. The Circus World continued in use as late as 1996.
