= Bert Wolstein =

American businessman

Bert L. Wolstein
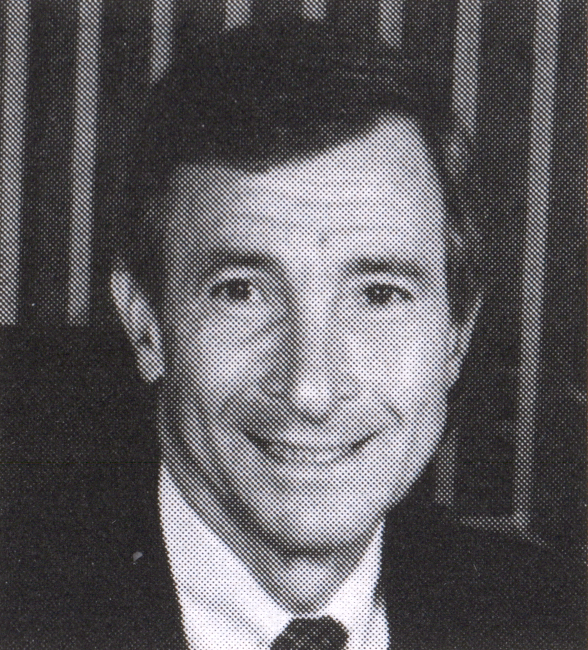
- Wolstein circa 1984
- Born: Bertram Leonard Wolstein; February 23, 1927; East Cleveland, Ohio, U.S.
- Died: May 17, 2004 (aged 77); Mayfield Heights, Ohio, U.S.
- Occupations: Real estate developer, sports team owner, philanthropist
- Spouse: Iris Shur Wolstein
- Children: Cheryl, Scott

Bertram Leonard Wolstein (February 23, 1927 — May 17, 2004), known to his friends as Bart and publicly as Bert L. Wolstein, was an American real estate developer, sports team owner, and philanthropist based in Cleveland, Ohio. He founded Developers Diversified Realty Corporation (now SITE Centers), which at the time of his death was the 4th-largest developer of shopping centers in the United States. In 1979, he purchased the Cleveland Force Major Indoor Soccer League team, and attempted to purchase the Cleveland Browns in 1998. He retired from active business in 1997, and became one of the most generous donors in the United States in his final years.

== Early life and education ==
Wolstein was born to a Jewish family on February 23, 1927, in East Cleveland, Ohio, to Joseph and Sarah (née Lipson) Wolstein. He had an older sister, Malvene. Both his parents were immigrants from the Russian Empire. His father had been born in Minsk, and emigrated to the United States in 1903. Fluent in Yiddish, he was an actor in Yiddish theater for 15 years before taking a job as a fabric cutter for Printz Bierderman Co. and later Keller Kohn Co. His mother was also born in Minsk, and emigrated to the United States in 1904. She worked in clerical jobs for the General Accounting Office and for the Cuyahoga County Board of Elections.

The Wolsteins lived in a very small home with another family in East Cleveland. When Wolstein was 12 years old, they moved into a duplex in adjacent Cleveland Heights, Ohio. The family was poor, and the onset of the Great Depression worsened their financial condition. Wolstein went to work at a young age, and held down a series of jobs while attending local public school: Selling copies of the Cleveland Press newspaper, stocking shelves and working as a cashier at his aunt's store, working as a soda jerk at various local drugstores, selling hot dogs and soft drinks at League Park (a baseball stadium in Cleveland), cleaning home furnaces, shoveling snow from driveways, and selling Christmas trees. He was enterprising, and once made money by selling cold soft drinks from his toy wagon to construction workers building new homes across the street from where he lived. The hard work did not leave him embittered. Even as a boy and young teenager, Wolstein saw hardship as a means of gaining valuable work experienced. The Depression left a profound impact on him. "Iris and I never forgot where we came from," Wolstein said in 2003. "We were Depression babies, and no matter how much we have or the rare experiences we have encountered along the way, our roots will always be in Cleveland's old Jewish working class neighborhood, Tuscora Road."

Wolstein was educated at Parkwood and Boulevard elementary schools and Roosevelt Junior High School. He graduated from Cleveland Heights High School in 1945, and enlisted in the U.S. Navy. He was trained as a pharmacist's mate, and was discharged in 1946 as part of the downsizing of U.S. armed forces. Still debating what to do with his life, Wolstein enrolled in the accounting program at Cleveland College, an adult education institution jointly operated by Western Reserve University and Case School of Applied Science, paying for his education by working part-time coordinating subcontractors for a local building firm. The firm was owned by Harold I. Shur, his future father-in-law. In 1949, Wolstein enrolled at the Cleveland–Marshall Law School, (Note: Although he lacked an undergraduate degree, he was accepted because of his Navy service.) an independent JD-granting institution which had formed in 1946. He attended classes at night while working full-time for Kalamazoo Appliances, Harold Shur's home heating and air conditioning business.

Wolstein graduated cum laude and seventh in his class from Cleveland-Marshall in 1953, and passed the bar exam that same year.

== Career ==
=== Early real estate development ===
Wolstein began his business career working in real estate development rather than the law. His wife's family owned L&J Development, a Cleveland-area home builder. Wolstein went to work for the company, and assisted with the development of several suburban housing projects. Wolstein helped build his first shopping center, the Great Northern Mall in North Olmsted, Ohio, during his tenure with the firm. In 1959, Wolstein returned to the practice of law while continuing to work in real estate. He formed several construction firms with Wilbur J. Horwitz, his personal insurance agent and owner of a local insurance company. Wolstein oversaw the firm's legal business while his partner ran the construction side of things. The firm struggled at first, and incurred heavy debts in order to raise the capital to build the houses it sold. In 1964, one of Wolstein's firms, Scott Construction, received a $725,000 loan ($2,900,000 in 2025 dollars) to build a 350-home development in Twinsburg, Ohio. Wolstein named the development Heritage Hill. The project was so financially successful that Wolstein closed his law practice and began concentrating solely on real estate.

=== Developers Diversified ===
In 1965, Wolstein partnered with Hannan Construction Co. and incorporated a new company, Developers Diversified, with the goal of constructing retail shopping centers. Wolstein reached an agreement with Kmart to provide the anchor tenant for his shopping malls. The first Kmart-centered mall opened in 1967. Wolstein set a goal of constructing five malls, but his business proved so successful that within 15 years he'd built 150 shopping centers nationwide. By 1980, Developers Diversified had constructed one in six Kmart stores, and was Kmart's second-largest development partner. Developers Diversified ended its relationship with Kmart in 1980, but continued to build shopping malls around large anchor tenants such as Home Depot, Kohl's, and Wal-Mart.

In 1981, Wolstein formed Diversified Equities, an investment company, with his son, Scott Wolstein, and businessman Jim Schoff.

In December 1992, Developers Diversified filed to become a publicly held real estate investment trust (REIT). The move was prompted by a nationwide credit contraction that had severely limited Developers Diversified's ability to engage in new projects. The company, now known as Developers Diversified Realty Corp. (DDRC), went public in February, listing its shares on the New York Stock Exchange. The firm sold 9.2 million shares, raising $202 million ($450,200,000 in 2025 dollars). It was the second-largest public offering of common stock ever offered by a newly formed REIT. Wolstein became chairman of the board of directors of the new company, while Scott Wolstein became its chief executive officer. Diversified Equities merged with Developers Diversified in 1993.

Wolstein retired from DDRC in February 1997. Having spent most of his life as a freewheeling maverick who operated on hunches and personal relationships, he had become frustrated having to subordinate his decisions to those of a board of directors and stockholders (many of whom had no experience in real estate development). Wolstein retained about 2 million of the firm's 25 million shares, worth about $70 million ($140,400,000 in 2025 dollars), and was given the title of Chairman Emeritus. At the time of his departure, DDRC was the 15th largest shopping center owner in the nation.

=== Heritage Development ===
After leaving DDRC, Wolstein formed a new real estate development firm, Heritage Development Co. Having developed golf courses in Aurora, Ohio, and North Canton, Ohio—both designed by Jack Nicklaus—Wolstein intended to build more golf courses, often in a public-private partnership with local city or county governments. Wolstein had also retained ownership of 7 acres (28,000 m^{2}) of land on the east bank of the Cleveland Flats, and intended to use Heritage Development to begin designing, constructing, and operating a wide range of restaurants, bars, dance clubs, and music venues there. Wolstein also expressed interest in building an industrial park in Twinsburg on property he owned there, as well as getting back into the residential housing market.

Heritage Development purchased the Renaissance Building, an office building located on Playhouse Square in downtown Cleveland which Wolstein had personally bought in 1988. The company also developed the Bertram Inn and Conference Center and The Marketplace at the Four Corners Shopping Center in Aurora; the Moen Inc. office building in North Olmsted; the Macedonia Commons mall in Macedonia, Ohio; and the Creekview Commons mall in Brecksville, Ohio.

In 2003, as the city of Cleveland was debating whether to build a new convention center to replace the existing Cleveland Convention Center, a number of sites were under consideration. Wolstein suggested using the disused, 50-acre (200,000 m^{2}) Norfolk Southern rail yard near the Jacobs Field baseball stadium. Wolstein proposed that Heritage Development purchase the Norfolk Southern site and construct a 500,000-square-foot (46,000 m^{2}) convention center, a 20-story hotel, a retail center with shops and restaurants, and an RTA station. In return, the city would agree to lease the convention center from him for $19.5 million ($34,100,000 in 2025 dollars) a year for 25 years. Cleveland Tomorrow, an alliance of business interests in Cleveland which was pushing for another site, said Wolstein's proposal would cost $64 million ($112,000,000 in 2025 dollars) more than any alternative site. Wolstein angrily faulted their analysis, and called the site selection process highly flawed. No decision on a convention center site was made in 2003. It would be another four years before the city agreed to sell the existing convention center to Cuyahoga County, which built a new convention center on the same site.

== Sports team ownership ==
=== Cleveland Force ===
On October 3, 1979, Wolstein purchased a majority interest in the Cleveland Force Major Indoor Soccer League (MISL) team from owners Eric Henderson and Frank Celeste for $25,000 ($100,000 in 2025 dollars). The team, and the league, were just a year old. Within a year, he had more than doubled fan attendance at games to 5,000 from 2,000. The team struggled to win fans, obtain business community backing, and win games. But by 1983, it was in the playoffs, during which it drew 19,106 fans to its final playoff game. The team won almost two-thirds of its games over the next five seasons, and twice battled for the Eastern Division title. In 1988, the Force became the first Cleveland-area sports team to play for a national championship in 24 years. The team lost the championship series, zero games to four. The Force was the only team in the MISL to turn a profit that year. The team also set a league-high average attendance record of 14,121 fans that season. Wolstein folded the team in 1988, after the league ran into severe financial difficulties and four other MISL teams folded due to bankruptcy.

In 2004, when Major League Soccer made a two-team expansion, Wolstein signed a letter of intent to buy one of the franchises and base it in Cleveland. He also pledged to contribute $20 million ($34,100,000 in 2025 dollars) toward the cost of a $110 million ($187,500,000 in 2025 dollars) stadium for the team. His bid ended when he died a month before the league awarded the franchise.

=== Attempted Cleveland Browns ownership ===
In 1995, Art Modell, owner of the Cleveland Browns professional football team, suddenly moved the team to the city of Baltimore, Maryland. To settle legal claims made in the wake of the relocation, the Modell and the National Football League (NFL) agreed to allow the Browns name, trademarks, and other indicia to remain in Cleveland if the city agreed to build a new football stadium. The city agreed to do so. With FirstEnergy Stadium due to open in the fall of 1999, a bidding war to see who would own the new team erupted in 1997.

Wolstein assembled a group which included backing from retired Browns offensive lineman Dick Schafrath (now an Ohio state senator, former Ohio State University offensive lineman John Hicks, and other retired NFL players. The group quietly informed the NFL of their intent in the summer of 1997, and went public with their bid on January 16, 1998. Football experts believed that the franchise rights would sell for $300 million ($511,400,000 in 2025 dollars) or more. Under NFL rules, Wolstein (the lead partner in the group) was required to personally provide at least 30 percent of the purchase price, and his investors group could contain only 10 or fewer members.

According to press reports, Wolstein proposed to pay just 30 percent of the auction price in cash. The NFL would own the remaining 70 percent of the team. In a boost to his efforts, Wolstein recruited retired Browns fullback Jim Brown and area automobile dealer Alan Spitzer as partners in the investment group. Wolstein was bidding against three others: Al Lerner, billionaire owner of MBNA, the nation's second-largest issuer of credit cards; Charles Dolan, founder of HBO and the Cablevision cable television service, and his attorney brother, Larry Dolan; and New York City banker and real estate developer Howard Milstein. As the bidding price rose above $400 million ($681,800,000 in 2025 dollars), Wolstein's bid was seen as increasingly unattractive. On September 8, 1998, the NFL sold the Cleveland Browns franchise rights to the Al Lerner group for $450 million ($767,000,000 in 2025 dollars).

== Philanthropy ==
Wolstein was a frequent supporter of a number charities and nonprofit organizations throughout the greater Cleveland area for most of his life.

One of Wolstein's first major gifts came in 1997, when he and his wife, Iris Wolstein, donated $750,000 ($1,500,000 in 2025 dollars) to United Cerebral Palsy of Greater Cleveland. The organization used the money to finish a new rehabilitation and workshop center, which it named the Bart and Iris Wolstein Building.

The Wolsteins made a $1.5 million ($2,800,000 in 2025 dollars) donation in 2000 to renovate the three-story bell tower at Ohio State University. The renovated facility, renamed the Iris S. and Bert L. Wolstein Football Center, contained new locker rooms, a media center, and recruitment center.

The Wolsteins donated $100,000 ($182,000 in 2025 dollars) to the Cleveland–Marshall College of Law in 2001, which helped to fund scholarships for needy law students and to assist the law school in paying architectural fees for a much-needed renovation.

In 2002, the Wolsteins donated $1 million ($1,800,000 in 2025 dollars) to renovate Sycamore Hall at the Weatherhead School of Management at Case Western Reserve University. The structure was renamed Iris S. and Bert L. Wolstein Hall in their honor. The donation allowed the management school to divert resources to the establishment of a new undergraduate program which emphasized entrepreneurship over mathematical models of business management. The Wolsteins also donated $1.5 million ($2,700,000 in 2025 dollars) to endow a professorship at Weatherhead. The combined gift was the largest gifts received by either the school or the parent university in recent years.

In January 2003, the Wolsteins donated $25 million ($43,800,000 in 2025 dollars) to both University Hospitals of Cleveland and Case Western Reserve University to enable the construction of a joint medical research building. The 320,000-square-foot (30,000 m^{2}), six-story building contained laboratory and office space for 900 biomedical researchers and a 28,000-cage mouse research facility. The structure was named the Iris S. and Bert L. Wolstein Research Building in their honor.

In January 2004, The Chronicle of Philanthropy listed the Wolsteins as one of the 60 most generous donors in the nation for 2003.

== Personal life ==
Since childhood, Wolstein had been nicknamed "Bart" by his family and friends, but as early as 1948, he used the name "Bert" in public as well.

In 1946, Wolstein was playing touch football in Cain Park in Cleveland Heights when the ball landed at the feet of Iris Shur. The couple fell immediately in love, and married on September 11, 1948. The couple had two children: Cheryl (born June 19, 1950) and Scott (June 24, 1952 – May 26, 2022).

=== Death ===
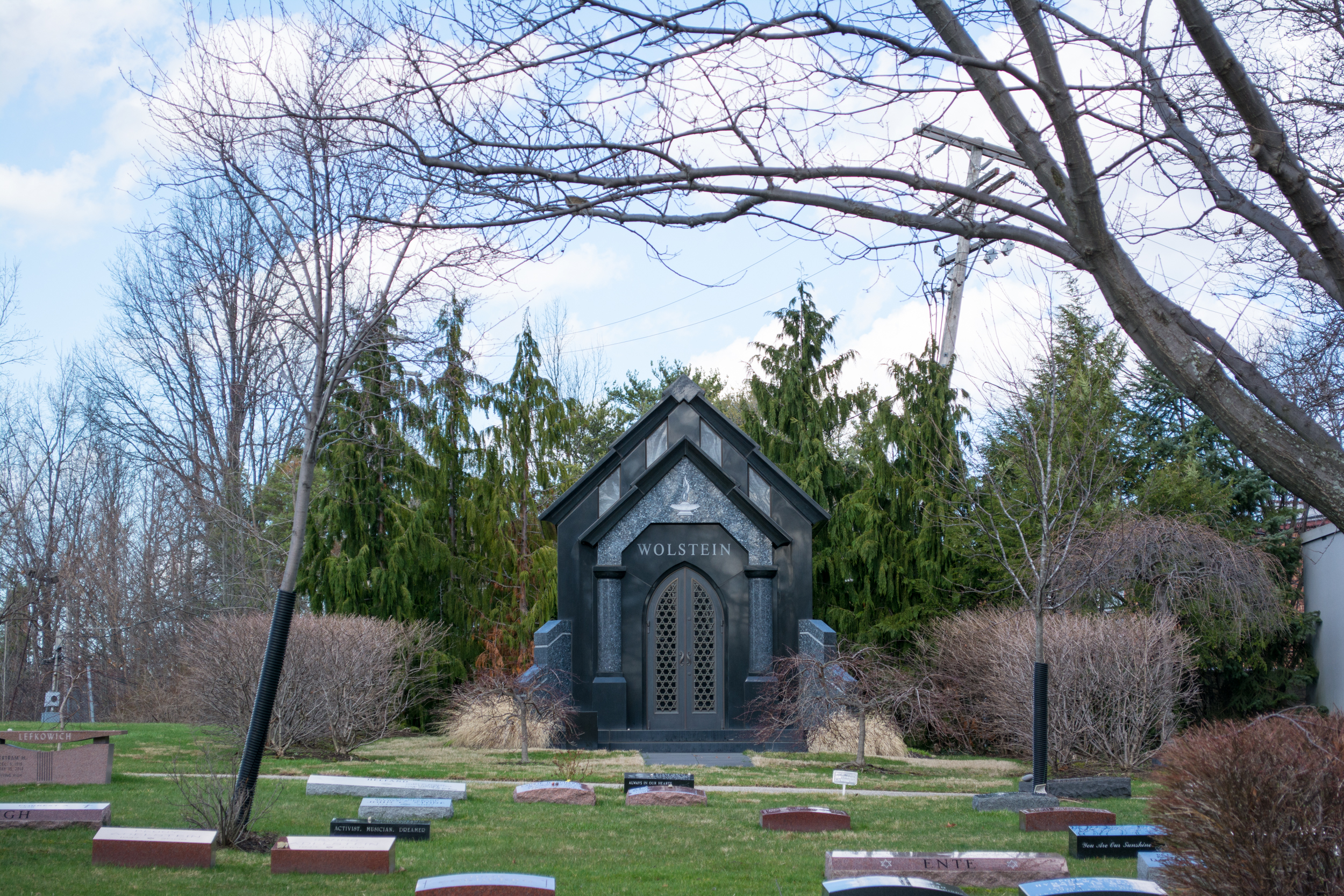
Wolstein's mausoleum at Mayfield Cemetery.

Wolstein suffered from a recurrence of cancer throughout his life. A cancerous tumor was removed from his back when he was in his late 20s. In 2000, he underwent operations to remove a cancerous prostate, a cancerous cyst on his neck, and a cancerous thyroid. The cancer recurred a short time later, and had metastasized. He died of a heart attack on May 17, 2004, at Hillcrest Hospital in Mayfield Heights, Ohio. At the time of his death, DDRC owned 400 shopping centers in 44 states, and was the fourth-largest shopping center developer in the nation.

He was buried at Mayfield Cemetery in Cleveland Heights.

== Legacy ==
On October 27, 2004, Iris Wolstein donated $6.25 million ($10,700,000 in 2025 dollars) to the Cleveland-Marshall College of Law in Wolstein's name. The gift included $5 million ($8,500,000 in 2025 dollars) for building renovations, the purchase of new technology, and scholarships for needy students. The remainder of the pledge matched, up to $1.25 million ($2,100,000 in 2025 dollars), money raised for a new law school endowment. The endowment was named for the Wolsteins. It was one of the largest donations in Cleveland State University's history.

In January 2005, Cleveland State University renamed its Convocation Center the Bert L. and Iris S. Wolstein Convocation Center in recognition of the 2004 donation to the law school.
