= Noodle Kidoodle =

American educational toy store

- Type: Private
- Industry: Retail
- Founded: 1931 (as the Star Trading Company); 1946 (as Greenman Bros. Inc.); 1993 (as Noodle Kidoodle)
- Defunct: 2000
- Fate: Acquired by Zany Brainy
- Headquarters: Farmingdale, New York, United States
- Products: Toys, books

Noodle Kidoodle was an American retail chain that sold educational toys from 1993 to 2000.

The company's slogan was "Kids learn best when they're having fun!". The chain operated stores in New York, New Jersey, Connecticut, Massachusetts, New Hampshire, Michigan, Illinois, Kansas, Nebraska and Texas. The company was founded by Stanley Greenman, who has previously operated large-store chains such as Circus World, Play World and Playland, through his family business Greenman Bros. Inc.

The first store was opened in 1993, in Greenvale, New York. In December 1995, Greenman Bros. Inc., the parent company of Noodle Kidoodle, was renamed Noodle Kidoodle Inc. In 2000, Noodle Kidoodle was acquired by Zany Brainy. Zany Brainy paid $35 million for 60 stores. The new company was headquartered in Zany Brainy's main offices in King of Prussia, Pennsylvania.
