= Stanley P. Goldstein =

American businessman (1934–2024)

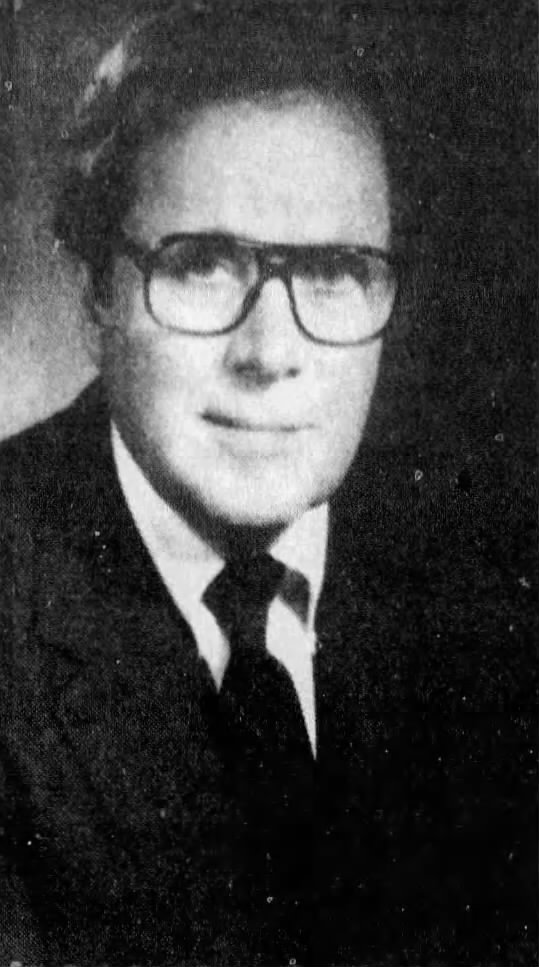
- Goldstein in 1986
- Born: June 5, 1934; Woonsocket, Rhode Island, U.S.
- Died: May 21, 2024 (aged 89); Providence, Rhode Island, U.S.
- Education: University of Pennsylvania (BS)
- Occupation: Businessman
- Spouse: Merle
- Military career
- Allegiance: United States
- Branch: United States Army

Stanley P. Goldstein (June 5, 1934 – May 21, 2024) was an American businessman.

== Life and career ==
Goldstein was born in Woonsocket, Rhode Island. He attended the Wharton School of the University of Pennsylvania, graduating in 1955. He served in the United States Army.

In 1963, Goldstein co-founded CVS Health along with his brother Sidney and business partner Ralph P. Hoagland III.

Goldstein was chairman and chief executive officer of Melville during the 1980s and 1990s.

Goldstein died from cancer at his home in Providence, Rhode Island, on May 21, 2024, at the age of 89.
