= Donald Kaufman (collector) =

American toy collector

Donald Lewis Kaufman
- Born: October 8, 1930; Pittsfield, Massachusetts
- Died: October 12, 2009 (aged 79); Pittsfield
- Known for: Collector of antique toys
- Spouse(s): Faith Dichter (divorced); Sally Golden (until his death)

Donald Lewis Kaufman (8 October 1930 – 12 October 2009) was an American toy collector amassing millions of dollars' worth of antique items in his country home in western Massachusetts.

== Early life ==
Kaufman was born on 8 October 1930, in Pittsfield, Massachusetts, to Harry and Ruth Klein Kaufman. His father and uncle had previously started Kaufman Brothers, a wholesale candy store, in 1922. Kaufman was educated at the North Adams State College. He then did national service in the Army in the early 1950s. Afterwards he joined Kaufman Brothers.

== KB Toys ==
Kaufman Brothers became a toy retailer in the 1970s, with the name Kay-Bee Toy & Hobby, later known as KB Toys. Kaufman served as vice president of the company and helped to expand the chain to shopping malls in nearly every U.S. state. Kaufman retired from his position as vice president in 1981.

== Personal life ==
Kaufman married Faith Dichter and they had three daughters. The marriage was eventually dissolved. He then married Sally Golden, who had two children from her previous marriage. Throughout his adult life he spent vacations touring toy fairs in the Northeast and in Europe and amassed a huge collection of antique toy cars and trucks.

== The collection ==
Kaufman's important collection of antique toys included his first item, International Harvester Red Baby truck, purchased for $4 from a collector friend in 1950. The collection also included a working 1912 Märklin live-steam fire engine and he had more than 700 cars and trucks arranged on shelves in a four-level annex to his property. Other larger items included 40 pedal and oversized pressed-steel cars. The total size of the collection was estimated at 7,000 items, which he amassed with the help of his wife, Sally. "It was a team effort...It was one of my lifelong pleasures but when she came into my life 20-some years ago she partnered in it and enjoyed what we did just as much as I did. I couldn't have done this without her."

In March 2009, about a fifth of his collection had been sold at auction by Bertoia Auctions for $4.2 million. In September a further 1,100 toys brought in an estimated $3 million. At the time of the first sale, Jeanne Bertoia stated it would take a series of 4-6 sales to sell the entire collection. Kaufman said, "It's time for me to sell."

== Death ==
Kaufman died in Pittsfield, Massachusetts, on October 12, 2009, from a heart attack.
