= Melville Shoe Corporation =

American shoe company

- Industry: Footwear
- Founded: 1892; 134 years ago
- Founder: Frank Melville
- Defunct: 1922
- Fate: Operating
- Successor: Melville Corporation (now CVS Corp)
- Headquarters: Harrison, New York
- Area served: United States
- Products: Shoes

The Melville Shoe Corporation was a Harrison, New York-based shoe company.

Founded by Frank Melville in 1892, the company was incorporated in 1916. From its inception through 1923 it never had an unprofitable year, and paid dividends on preferred stock from 1916 to 1923.

In 1922 the company was reorganized as the Melville Corporation, which would grow into a major retail conglomerate.
