= SITE Centers =

American real estate company

SITE Centers Corp.
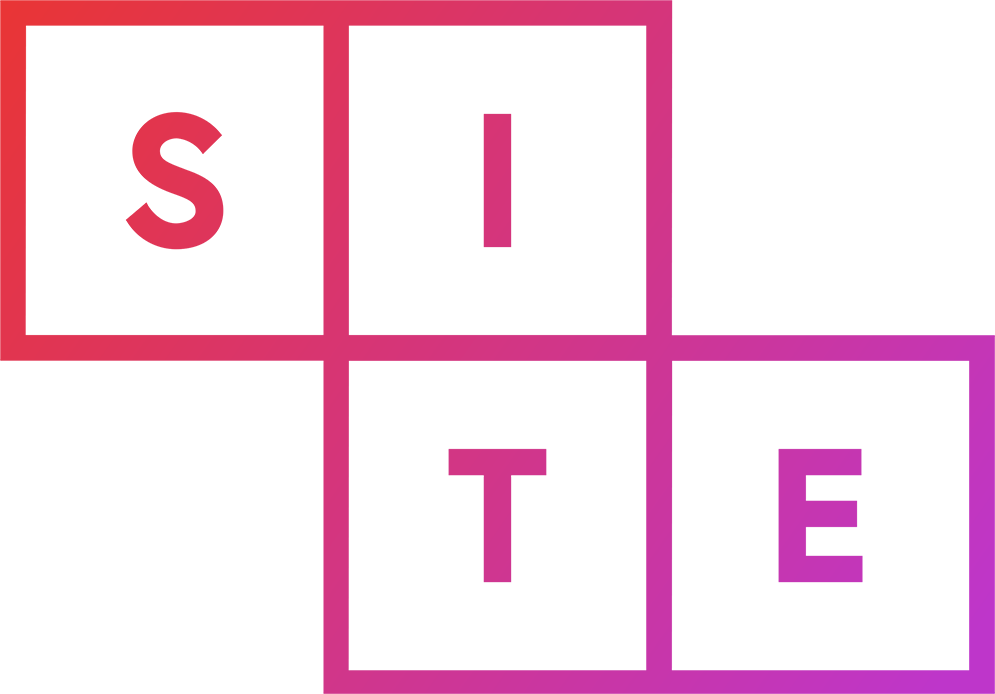

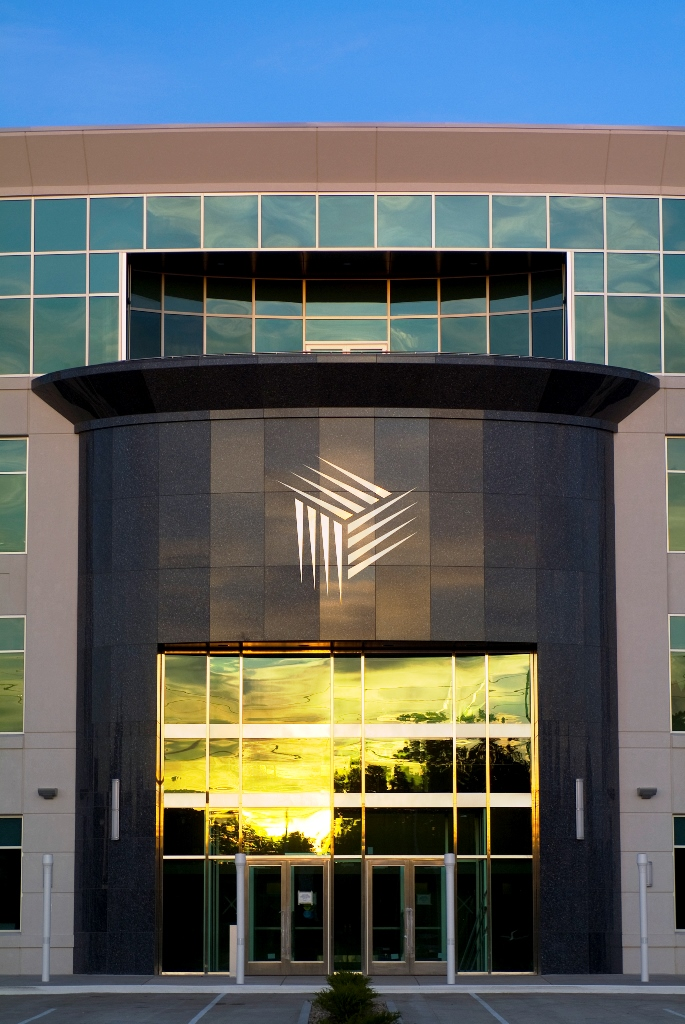
- SITE Centers headquarters in Beachwood, Ohio
- Type: Public company
- Traded as: NYSE: SITC Russell 1000 component
- Industry: Real estate investment trust
- Founded: 1965; 61 years ago (as Developers Diversified Realty, Inc.)
- Founder: Bert Wolstein
- Headquarters: Beachwood, Ohio
- Key people: David R. Lukes, President & CEO; Conor Fennerty, CFO
- Revenue: ▲$532.86 million (2021)
- Net income: ▲$125.41 million (2021)
- Total assets: ▼$3.967 billion (2021)
- Total equity: ▲$2.036 billion (2021)
- Number of employees: 293 (2021)
- Website: www.sitecenters.com

SITE Centers Corp. (formerly DDR Corp. and Developers Diversified Realty, Inc.) is a publicly traded real estate investment trust that invests in shopping centers. Founded in 1965 by Bert Wolstein, the company is headquartered in Beachwood, Ohio. As of December 31, 2019 the company owned interests in 170 shopping centers in the United States containing 57.0 million square feet and managed 13.2 million square feet for Retail Value Inc. Notable properties wholly owned by the company include Shopper's World in Framingham, Massachusetts. Its major tenants include retailers such as TJX Companies, PetSmart, Dick's Sporting Goods, Ulta Beauty, Ross Stores, and Nordstrom.

== History ==
SITE Centers was founded in 1965 by Bert Wolstein as Developers Diversified Realty, Inc. After two years, the company built its first property, a KMart store in Eastlake, Ohio.

On February 12, 1993, Developers Diversified Realty, Inc. became a public company after making its initial public offering. Two years later the company acquired ten power centers from Homart Development Company during that company's acquisition by GGP Inc.

In 1998, the company acquired a portfolio of nine properties in Salt Lake City for $300 million. In 2002, the company acquired JDN Realty Corporation for $436 million in stock. In February 2011, the company's executive chairman, Scott Wolstein, resigned, and the company was renamed to DDR Corp. that September.

In December, the company sold Town Center Plaza to Glimcher Realty Trust in exchange for Polaris Towne Center.

In August 2013, DDR Corp. entered into a joint venture with Blackstone Group and acquired seven open-air shopping centers from Regency Centers Corporation for $332 million. In March of the next year, the company agreed to exit its Brazilian joint venture by selling its stake to the firm's largest shareholder for $343.6 million. In October 2014, DDR Corp. entered into a second joint venture with Blackstone Group, acquiring seventy shopping centers totaling 15.7 million square feet for $1.93 billion.

In February 2015, David Oakes was appointed as president and chief executive officer of the company. He fired and replaced by Thomas August in July 2016. In January 2016, the company sold Paseo Colorado to Cypress Equities. In October of the same year, the company sold a 16-property portfolio for $390 million in a transaction brokered by HFF.

In July 2018, the company completed the corporate spin-off of Retail Value, Inc. Three months later, the company announced a name change to SITE Centers Corp.

In October 2023, the company started selling off its traditional shopping center properties after establishing a new company, Curbline Properties. By late 2025, Site Centers had sold nearly $3.7 billion of its retail properties.
