= Rainbow Shops =

American fashion retail chain

Rainbow USA Inc.
- Type: Private
- Industry: Apparel, retail
- Founded: 1935; 91 years ago
- Founder: Irving Arthur Swarzman
- Headquarters: Brooklyn, NY, US
- Number of locations: 1,300 (2021)
- Key people: Joseph Chehebar (CEO); Albert Chehebar (President)
- Products: Clothing; footwear
- Revenue: ▲US$1.5 billion (2021)
- Number of employees: 12,000 (2021)
- Subsidiaries: 5-7-9; Joyce Leslie; Marianne
- Website: www.rainbowshops.com

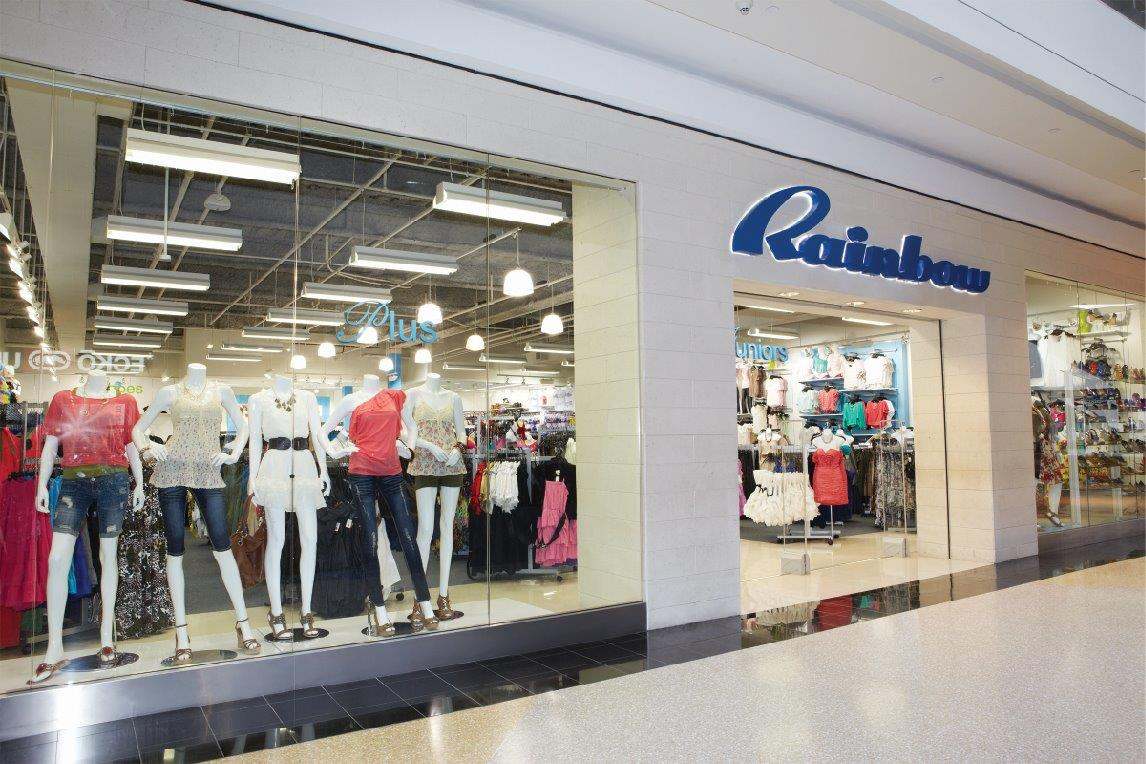
Store front

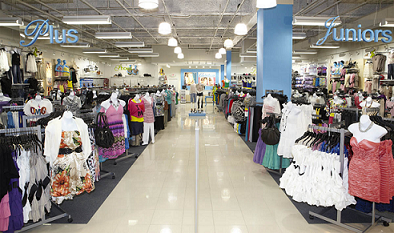
Rainbow Store Setup

Rainbow USA Inc. (commonly referred to as Rainbow Shops or simply Rainbow) is a privately held, moderately priced American retail apparel chain comprising several lifestyle brands primarily targeting teenagers and young women. The company is headquartered in the East New York section of Brooklyn, New York, United States.

== History ==
Rainbow Shops was founded in 1935 in New York City by Irving Arthur Swarzman, an Austrian native who was raised in Brooklyn. Swarzman chose the name “Rainbow” to reflect the vibrant and diverse range of affordable fashion options sold at the store. Swarzman brought his four brothers (Herman, Oscar, Ira, and Nat) into the business as they reached working age. They built the business from one shop to a high of eighty-two stores before selling the business in the 1980s, according to Mr. Swarzman's granddaughter. Rainbow Shops is now owned by the Syrian-Jewish Chehebar family. Today, along with sister brands 5-7-9 and Marianne, Rainbow operates 1,300 stores in United States, Puerto Rico, and the U.S. Virgin Islands.

Rainbow's holding company, A.I.J.J. Enterprises Inc., purchased the 5-7-9 brand in 1999 from the bankrupt Edison Brothers Stores. It's operated through a company division named The New 5-7-9 and Beyond, Inc.

Rainbow stores are an average of 5,000 square ft. Each store’s merchandise varies by location, depending upon demographics and the size of the location. Larger stores usually carry juniors, plus, lingerie, shoes and kids departments.

== E-commerce ==
In November 2017, the company launched its e-commerce website, expanding its retail offerings to incorporate junior and plus-size apparel, footwear, and accessories.

== In popular culture ==
- Rainbow is mentioned in the film Night School, directed by Malcolm D. Lee, in which Tiffany Haddish's character erroneously refers to it as "Rainbow's".
