= Edison Brothers Stores =

American retail conglomerate (1922–1999)

- Company type: Private
- Traded as: NYSE: EBS
- Industry: Retail
- Founded: October 28, 1922; 103 years ago in Atlanta, Georgia, United States
- Founders: Sam Edison, Harry Edison, Mark Edison, Irving Edison, and Simon Edison
- Defunct: May 31, 1999; 27 years ago
- Fate: Chapter 11 Bankruptcy; Liquidation
- Area served: United States
- Subsidiaries: Dave and Buster’s (1989-1995); Bakers; Chandlers; Leed's; Burts; Wild Pair; Precis; Gussini; Jeans West/JW; J. Riggings; 5-7-9 (1970-1999); Oaktree; Foxmoor Casuals; Fashion Conspiracy; Repp Ltd. Webster; Zeidler & Zeidler; Harry's Big and Tall; Phoenix Big & Tall (catalog); Coda; Shifty's; Time-Out; Space Port; Virtuality; Exhilarama; United Sporting Goods; Handyman Home Improvement Centers; Joan Bari

Edison Brothers Stores, Inc., was a retail conglomerate based in St. Louis, Missouri. It operated numerous retail chains mainly located in shopping malls, mostly in the fields of shoes, clothing and entertainment, with Bakers Shoes as its flagship chain. The company was liquidated in 1999, though some of the chains it operated continued under different owners.

== History ==
The company began on October 28, 1922, when brothers Sam, Harry, Mark, Irving, and Simon Edison—most of whom had previous experience in the shoe business working for others—opened their first shoe store, Chandler's, in Atlanta, Georgia. The store was a success and the brothers opened up a second shoe store, called Baker's, in April 1924. By 1928, the brothers operated 12 Chandler's stores; the next year, the company went public, using the money raised to open 14 more Baker's stores and three more Chandler's stores, and moved its headquarters to St. Louis.

The company survived the Great Depression by emphasizing its lower-priced Baker's shoes and starting a new store called Burt's that sold shoes at an even lower price point. Stores the company opened on the West Coast took the name Leed's to avoid confusion with an existing chain also named Baker's. During World War II the company added a line of millinery to combat lost sales due to rationing of sole leather for the war effort, but the line failed. In 1948 Edison Brothers, Inc., opened its first store in a shopping mall, and the company also opened its 200th store that same year. Nine years later, Edison opened its 300th store, and in 1958 sales went above $100 million (~$832 million in 2024). Harry Edison was named chairman of the board, and Irving Edison was elected president of the company.

In the 1960s the company expanded into women's clothing and children's shoes, and later in the decade began purchasing other retail chains, starting with Jeans West. In 1970 it purchased 5-7-9 Shops and in 1972 launched the Wild Pair shoe operation. It also acquired clothing chain Fashion Conspiracy, sporting goods retailer United Sporting Goods and Handyman Home Improvement Centers. By 1973 Edison Brothers was operating 1,000 store locations. Later in the decade it purchased the men's clothing chain Oaktree, and the company was operating 2,000 total locations by 1979, and by 1983, sales surpassed the $1 billion mark. That same year, Andy Newman, nephew of Julian Edison, became president of the shoe division, and Martin Sneider, the first non-Edison family member to hold a top management position in the company, became president of the company's rapidly growing apparel division. In 1985, Newman became company chairman and Sneider became president. The company continued to purchase retail chains, including young men's retailer J. Riggings (which it obtained in 1987 from the United States Shoe Corporation) and big-and-tall retailer Repp Ltd. In 1990 Edison Brothers purchased 225 locations of the Foxmoor Casuals women's clothing chain, some of which it converted to its other brands.

In 1989, Edison Brothers purchased entertainment-center chain Dave & Buster's; it spun the company off in 1995, with Newman resigning from Edison Brothers to serve as its president. Under Edison Brothers, Dave & Buster's was part of the company's entertainment division, which also included video arcade brands Time-Out and Space Port and virtual reality centers Virtuality and Exhilarama.

In November 1995, Edison Brothers filed for bankruptcy, cited a poor specialty retail environment and a bleak holiday season outlook and a plan to close 500 of its 2,700 outlets by January 1996. The company sold its entertainment division to Namco Cybertainment, a division of Japan's Namco, in 1996. It emerged from bankruptcy in 1997, but filed for bankruptcy again in March 1999 amid declining sales despite shrinking the company to about 1,500 retail locations. In April 1999, Gordon Brothers Group announced it had won a bid to liquidate merchandise at 664 Edison Brothers locations, including 295 J. Riggings stores, 234 JW/Jeans West stores and 135 Wild Pair stores. The remainder of the company was sold or liquidated.

In a 2009 memoir, Sneider blamed the company's woes on an abrupt shift in the market away from the company's small stores and private-label goods to heavily promoted brand names, too little advertising, too many promotional sales, and a paternalistic company culture that emphasized promoting from within and eschewed consultants and market research.

5-7-9 Shops were sold to a newly formed subsidiary of A.I.J.J. Enterprises, Inc., owner of Rainbow Shops. The U.S. retail and catalog operations of Repp Ltd. were sold to J. Baker, which operated the Casual Male big-and-tall chain, while Repp Ltd.'s Canadian operations were sold to Grafton-Fraser.

== Bakers Footwear Group ==
At the liquidation auction, Peter Edison—a grandson of the founders who had been the last family member associated with Edison Brothers when he left the company in 1997—bought the Bakers chain and some Wild Pair locations for $8 million (~$14.5 million in 2024). Edison and a group of investors had purchased a smaller chain of popular-priced shoe stores, Weiss-Neuman Shoe Company, from the Weiss Family, in 1997. He merged Bakers’ operations into Weiss & Neuman, and renamed it Bakers Footwear Group. Noting that "Bakers had become synonymous with cheap shoes," Edison set about reviving the chain, closing unprofitable stores and remodeling the remainder.

In October 2012, Bakers Footwear Group filed for Chapter 11 bankruptcy, citing declining sales. In November 2012, Bakers announced the sale of 47 stores to Aldo U.S., part of the Aldo Group. A last-minute effort to confirm a plan of re-organization failed, and the company was liquidated starting in January 2013.

== Bakers today ==
The Bakers shoe brand is currently owned by Bakers 2013, which purchased the Bakers brand and website domain at the liquidation and reopened some retail locations. The company is backed by New York-based shoe company Zigi. However, on December 31, 2023, Zigi declared Chapter 11 bankruptcy in New York.

== Retail chains formerly associated with Edison Brothers ==
=== Shoes ===
- Bakers
- Chandlers
- Leeds
- Burts
- Wild Pair
- Precis
- Gussini

=== Clothing ===
- Jeans West/JW
- J. Riggings
- 5-7-9
- Oaktree
- Foxmoor
- Fashion Conspiracy
- Repp Ltd.
- Webster
- Zeidler & Zeidler
- Harry's Big and Tall
- Phoenix Big & Tall (catalog)
- Coda
- Shifty's

=== Entertainment ===
- Dave & Buster's
- Time-Out
- Space Port
- Virtuality
- Exhilarama
- Slick Fielder's Bar & Grill

=== Other ===
- United Sporting Goods
- Handyman Home Improvement Centers
- Joan Bari

Terrasystems
