= Thom McAn =

American shoe brand and retail chain

- Industry: Footwear
- Founded: 1922; 104 years ago
- Founder: Ward Melville; J. Franklin McElwain
- Defunct: 1996; 30 years ago (as retail stores)
- Parent: Melville Corporation (1952–1996); Footstar (1996–2008); Sears Brands, LLC (2008–present)

Thom McAn is an American brand of shoes and was formerly a retail chain. Its shoes have been sold in Kmart and Sears stores. It consists of leather-dress, casual, and sneakers (under its Tm Sport label). Until the 1990s, Thom McAn had hundreds of retail stores in the US, and was one of the oldest and best-known shoe retailers in the country. As of late 2008, the brand was controlled by Sears Brands, LLC.

== History ==
Ward Melville created the Thom McAn brand with J. Franklin McElwain, a New Hampshire manufacturer. The name was inspired by Scottish golfer Thomas McCann. The first Thom McAn retail store opened in New York in 1922, selling a few simple styles at a low fixed price. Within five years, 300 stores were open, and by 1939 there were over 650 stores.

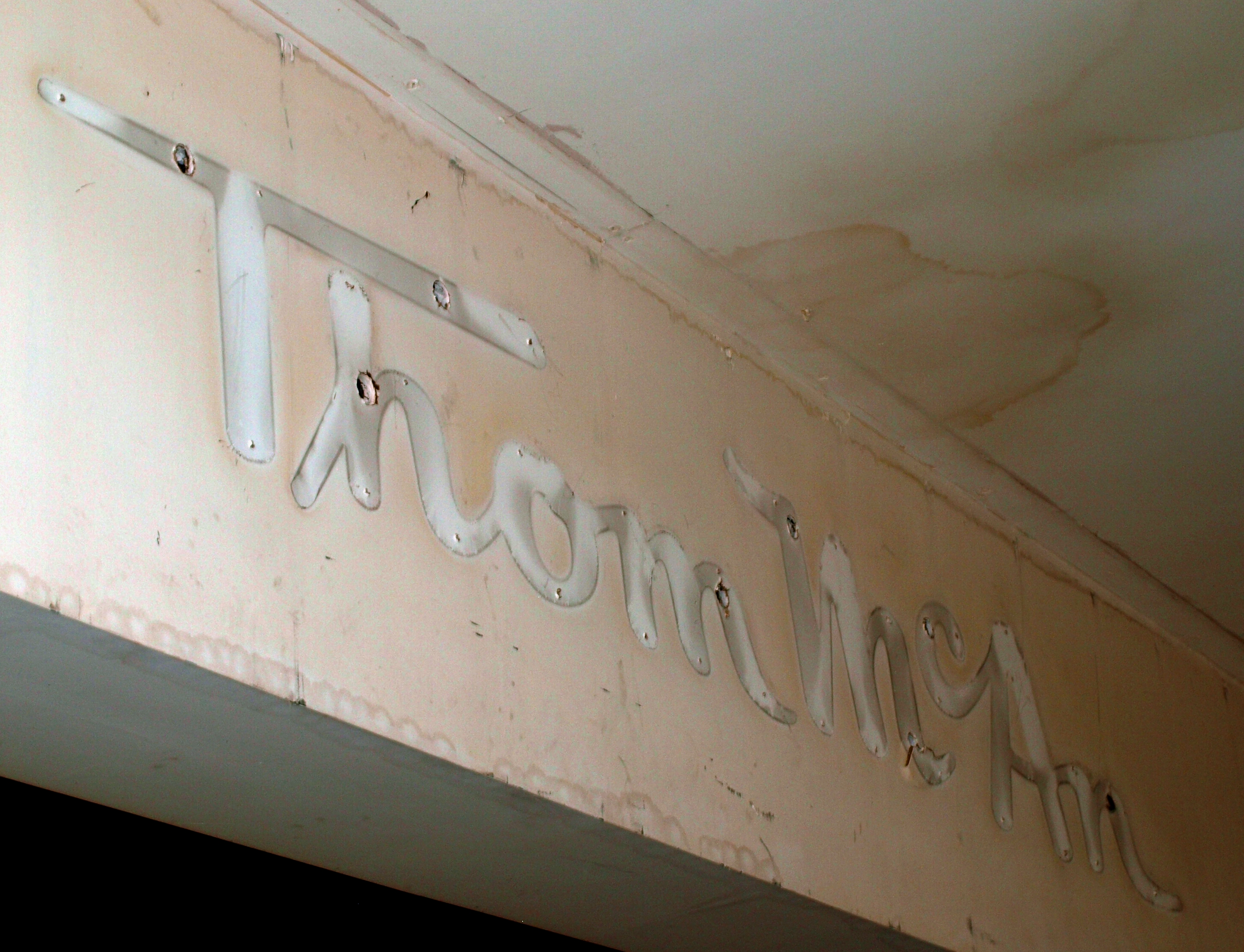
The label scar of a Thom McAn store sign in the nearly abandoned Hawthorne Plaza Shopping Center after the sign's removal

In 1952, the Melville Corporation acquired the 151-outlet Miles Shoes chain; by 1955, the company operated 850 stores and 12 factories. In 1960, Melville created Meldisco, which was dedicated to leasing and supplying family shoe departments in self-service discount department stores. By the end of the 1960s, Melville was the largest US shoe retailer, operating 1,400 stores.

By the 1980s, Melville was still the largest footwear retailer in the US. The company had diversified to add such chains as Chess King, Foxmoor and CVS Pharmacy. It began to phase out six of its seven footwear factories in 1983, and in 1985 it closed 72 Thom McAn outlets. In 1988, it purchased the athletic shoe chain FootAction.

In 1992, Thom McAn was down to 730 outlets, and Melville announced that it would close 350. In 1996, Melville closed the remaining Thom McAn outlets, converting approximately 100 of the locations to the Footaction USA format. As Melville divested its operations to focus on CVS, the remaining footwear operations including Meldisco were spun off into a new company, Footstar.

With the closure of the retail outlets, Thom McAn shoes began appearing in Kmart stores, through the footwear departments operated by Meldisco. In 2003, Footstar began selling Thom McAn in 1,500 Walmart stores.

In 2005, Kmart owner Sears Holdings reached an agreement with Footstar – which by then was in bankruptcy and consisted almost entirely of the Meldisco-operated footwear departments inside Kmart stores – to let Footstar run the shoe departments through 2008, after which Sears would purchase the remaining inventory at book value. Sears Holdings acquired Footstar's intellectual property including the Thom McAn brand name.

== See also ==
- G.R. Kinney Company, also known as Kinney Shoes
