= 5-7-9 =

Fashion retailer

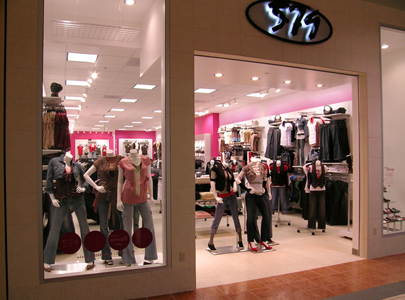
A 5-7-9 storefront in 2010.

5-7-9 is a low to mid-end fashion retailer, commonly found in malls throughout the continental United States and Puerto Rico, and formerly Hawaii. It is a sister company to Rainbow Shops. The chain offers mid to low-priced fashions for young teens and young women between 13 and 22 years of age. The store's name refers to the junior miss clothing sizes in which the store specializes.

== History ==
In 1970 (55 years ago), Edison Brothers Stores purchased the 5-7-9 chain, making it one of numerous clothing and shoe chains the company expanded nationwide. In May 1999 (25 years ago), Edison Brothers, which had gone bankrupt and was being liquidated, sold the 5-7-9 stores to a newly formed subsidiary of A.I.J.J. Enterprises, Inc., owner of Rainbow Shops.

Rainbow is headquartered in Brooklyn, New York.
