= KB Toys =

American chain of toy stores

- Final logo used from 1997 to 2009
- Trade name: KB Toys
- Formerly: Kaufman Brothers Inc. Kay-Bee Toy & Hobby
- Type: Private
- Industry: Toy store
- Predecessor: Kaufman Brothers candy wholesaler
- Founded: April 1, 1922; 104 years ago (as Kaufman Brothers candy wholesaler)
- Founders: Harry and Joseph Kaufman
- Defunct: February 9, 2009; 17 years ago (original company)
- Fate: Chapter 11 bankruptcy liquidation (original company)
- Successor: Toys "R" Us
- Headquarters: Pittsfield, Massachusetts, U.S.
- Number of locations: 461 (2008)
- Area served: United States
- Products: Children toys and games
- Owner: Kaufman family (1922–1981); Melville Corporation (1981–1996); Consolidated Stores Corporation (1996–2000); Bain Capital (2000–2005); Prentice Capital Management (2005–2009); Toys "R" Us (2009–2016); Strategic Marks, LLC. (2016–2020); The Firefly Brand Management Partnership (2024–present)
- Number of employees: 10,850 (2008)
- Subsidiaries: KBKids.com; KB Toy Express; KB Toy Outlet / KB Toy Liquidators; KB Toy Works
- Website: kbtoysverse.com New KB Toys website

KB Toys (stylized K·B Toys; Kay Bee Toys prior to 1981) was an American chain of mall-based retail toy stores. The company was founded in 1922 as Kaufman Brothers, a wholesale candy store. The company opened a wholesale toy store in 1946 and ended its candy wholesaling two years later to emphasize its toy products. Retail sales began during the 1970s, using the name Kay-Bee Toy & Hobby.

In 1999, the company operated 1,324 stores across the United States and was the second-largest toy retailer in the U.S., but it began to struggle in the early 21st century, declaring bankruptcy in both 2004 and 2008 before going out of business on February 9, 2009. The company operated 461 stores at the time of its closure.

International retailer Toys "R" Us acquired the remains of KB Toys, consisting mainly of its website, trademarks, and intellectual property rights. Strategic Marks, a company that buys and revives defunct brands, purchased the brand in 2016, and planned to open new stores using the name beginning in 2019; plans for this revival, however, were cancelled due to a lack of funding.

== History ==
Brothers Harry and Joseph Kaufman originally opened a wholesale candy store, Kaufman Brothers, in Pittsfield, Massachusetts on April 1, 1922. During the 1940s, the brothers acquired a wholesale toy company from a candy client who owed them money for outstanding debts. On September 21, 1946, Kaufman Brothers opened a wholesale toy store at 70 Columbus Avenue in Pittsfield, marking the company's entry into the wholesale toy industry. In 1948, Kaufman Brothers Inc. ended its involvement in the candy business to focus entirely on the toy business, which was thriving by that time.

In 1973, the company ended its toy wholesaling to become a shopping mall-based toy retailer known as Kay-Bee Toy & Hobby, with "Kay-Bee" named after the initials in "Kaufman Brothers". The company had 26 stores at the time. In 1977, the company name changed to Kay-Bee Toy and Hobby Shops Inc. By 1979, the company was based in Lee, Massachusetts. The company opened 40 new stores during that year, and stated that it was the nation's fastest-growing toy store chain, with 170 locations across the Midwestern and Eastern United States.

== Timeline ==
1922: On April 1, 1922, brothers Joseph and Harry Kaufman open a wholesale candy and soda fountain supply business, at 16 Gamwell Court, Pittsfield. (Berkshire Eagle, April 1, 1952.)

1940s: The business moved to 70 Columbus Avenue, Pittsfield. (Berk. Eagle, Sept. 21, 1946, at 9.) They were in the wholesale candy business for 25 years, in 1946 the business enters the wholesale toy business, by accident when they were given a wholesale toy company from a client in lieu of payment of debts. Also, Kaufman Brothers negotiated a license with Louis Marx and Co. to sell a line of toy trains. It was a good time to diversify because during World War II there was a shortage of candy ingredients, especially sugar. As wholesalers, they covered 400 stores within a 150-mile radius of the offices.

1948: The wholesale toy business is thriving, the brothers decide to focus on toys exclusively; so they sold the wholesale candy business to Giftos Brothers.

1955: Joseph dies, Harry becomes President. Other family members working in the business are Harry’s sons Richard and Donald, and Joseph’s son Howard, and son-in-law Harry (Buddy) Baker.

1960: The business runs its first retail toy store, in Winsted, CT, which was also given to the business in lieu of payment of debts.

1961: The business opens its first toy store in New Hartford, NY. The business moves offices to 125 Pecks Road, Pittsfield.

1963: the business opens a retail toy store called Playworld in the Allendale Shopping Center, Pittsfield

1968: The business opens its first mall store, in Eastfield Mall, Springfield, MA

1970: The business moves headquarters to Route 102, Lee, Ma.

1973: The business moves out of toy wholesaling, to focus exclusively focus on the toy retailing business, renaming itself Kay-Bee Toy & Hobby Shops, Inc. By now, it has 26 stores. In February, Howard becomes President, a role he held until retiring in 1986. (Berk. Eagle Dec. 17, 2006.)

1976: The business now has 65 stores, in New England, New York, and New Jersey.

1977: The business changes its name to K-B Toys.

1981: The business is operating 250 stores, in over 40 states, with over $140 million in sales. On August 1, the business is purchased by Melville Corp. and they rename the shops Kay-Bee Toy Stores. Richard and Donald Kaufman retire.

1981-86: Kay-Bee acquires: 19 Kids Toy Stores, 52 Toy World Stores, 13 Toy Fair Stores, 2 Toy Kingdom Stores, 5 Macs Toys, and 11 Rizzi Toys and 330 Circus World stores. The business becomes the nation’s largest retail toy chain. It employs almost 7,000 employees, and opens 330 more Kay-Bee Stores, and Toy Works Stores, adding $260 million in sales, so that by the end of 1985, Kay-Bee became the largest mall-based toy retailer with 585 stores, doing over $400 million in sales.

1986: March 31, Howard retires, work begins on a new headquarters at 100 West St. Pittsfield, MA. Long-time buyer and executive, Saul Rubenstein is named President.

=== Ownership changes ===
In 1981, the Melville Corporation purchased the company from the Kaufman family for $64.2 million (~$192 million in 2025). At the time, the company had 210 stores. Richard Kaufman, the son of Harry Kaufman, retired that year from his position as company president. Donald Kaufman, Richard's brother, also once served as a vice president for the company. In 1983, the bankrupt Wickes Companies, based in California, sold 37 of its 45 Toy World stores for $5.5 million to Kay-Bee Toy & Hobby, which took over the leases of the acquired stores. As of 1990, the company advertised itself as "The Toy Store in the Mall." That year, Melville Corporation purchased Circus World's 330 stores in 32 states for $95 million; the locations became part of the Kay-Bee division. In 1991, Kay-Bee Toys purchased K&K Toys' 136 stores, located in 18 states; the stores were converted to Kay-Bee stores the following year. During 1993 and 1994, as part of a major restructuring plan, Kay-Bee closed approximately 250 stores that had underperformed.

The company became a direct competitor to Toys "R" Us in 1994, when it expanded its mall locations and began opening stores known as KB Toy Works, which operated in strip malls and sold current and closeout toys. KB Toy Works stores were larger than regular KB Toys stores, which averaged 3,500 sq ft (330 m^{2}). Additionally, the company operated KB Toy Outlet stores, also known as KB Toy Liquidators; these stores were located in outlet malls and sold closeout toys. During holiday seasons, KB Toys operated temporary stores in malls known as KB Toy Express.

In 1996, Kay-Bee had sales of $1.1 billion, and was sold that year to Consolidated Stores Corporation at a cost of $315 million. Company sales reached $1.6 billion in 1998, the same year that its merchandise website was launched. The store logo was also changed to "KB" that year. As of May 1999, KB Toys operated 1,324 stores. That month, Consolidated Stores announced a deal with BrainPlay.com (which provided toy sales information) to operate KBToys.com. Through the deal, Consolidated Stores would invest $80 million and would own 80% of the new website, while BrainPlay would own the remainder. The new website would be based at BrainPlay's headquarters in Denver, and BrainPlay's website would become KB Toys' new website, which would compete against Toys "R" Us' website and eToys.com. KB Toys' website was revamped and relaunched in July 1999, as KBKids.com. At the time, KB Toys was the second-largest toy retailer in the United States. To increase the online presence for KBKids, Consolidated Stores partnered with AOL, which was visible to 17 million potential customers online. Through the agreement, AOL would provide links to the KBKids website. In September 1999, Consolidated Stores announced plans to sell 20% of KBKids through shares in an upcoming public offering. In October 1999, KBKids.com launched a $43 million (~$78 million in 2025) advertising campaign, including television commercials, to promote the site ahead of the holiday shopping season.

In January 2000, Consolidated Stores filed with the U.S. Securities and Exchange Commission to have KBKids listed on the NASDAQ as a separate and publicly traded company with the ticker symbol "KBKD". The initial public offering was valued at $210 million. Consolidated Stores was unable to earn considerable revenue from KB Toys, and experienced financial losses during 1999 and 2000, partially caused by spending on KBKids.com; another factor was decreased video game sales at KB Toys locations. In June 2000, Consolidated Stores withdrew its plans for KBKids to become a public company, and announced plans to sell KB Toys.

In December 2000, Bain Capital purchased the company for $305 million, in partnership with KB Toys' management team. The investment group included 200 store managers led by Bain Capital and by KB Toys' chief executive officer Michael Glazer. Bain Capital contributed $18.1 million to the sale, while the remainder was financed by banks that lent the money to KB Toys. The KB Toys sale included its various divisions: KB Toy Works, KB Toy Outlet, KB Toy Liquidators, KB Toy Express, and KBKids.com. The sale ended KB Toys' two decades as a subsidiary, turning it into a private company. KB Toys began focusing more on video games, which accounted for 20% of the company's revenue as of 2001. Starting that year, KB Toys opened temporary "stores within a store" at select Sears department stores during the Christmas season. The stores were initially known as "KB Toys at Sears", and averaged 1,500 sq ft (140 m^{2}). During 2001, KB Toys agreed to pay approximately $5.4 million (~$9.36 million in 2025) to acquire several inventory lots from the bankrupt eToys.

=== Bankruptcies and closure ===
In April 2002, through dividend recapitalization, Bain Capital received an $85 million payment from KB Toys, which financed the payment through $66 million in bank loans. Glazer received $18 million, while $16 million was divided among other executives. KB Toys suffered tough competition during the 2003 Christmas season, in addition to expensive store leases in malls with decreased customer visitation. Approximately 950 of the company's 1,217 stores were located in malls. With $300 million (~$475 million in 2025) in debt, KB Toys filed for Chapter 11 bankruptcy protection in January 2004 and subsequently closed more than 600 stores, resulting in the layoffs of more than 3,400 of the company's 13,000 employees. Creditors stated that the 2002 dividend deal with Bain Capital had rendered KB Toys insolvent, resulting in a loss of $109 million leading up to the bankruptcy filing. Bain Capital stated that KB Toys was financially well at the time of the dividend deal, and that the company's financial problems later on were unrelated to the deal.

In February 2005, KB Toys' creditors, including Hasbro and Lego, accused the company's top executives and majority shareholders of improperly providing themselves with multimillion-dollar payments prior to the bankruptcy. The creditors, referring to the April 2002 deal, alleged that the payments occurred during a decline in the economy and in KB Toys' business, and that the payments had a "devastating impact" on the company. During the same month, Big Lots (formerly Consolidated Stores) filed a lawsuit against Bain Capital, alleging it was owed $45 million (~$79.8 million in 2025) from the 2000 sale. Big Lots' lawsuit was dismissed in 2006.

KB Toys exited Chapter 11 bankruptcy in August 2005, with 90% of its ownership under PKBT Holdings, an affiliate of Prentice Capital Management. Bain Capital had attempted to retain control of KB Toys, which was instead awarded to Prentice Capital by a bankruptcy judge. Through the bankruptcy emerging plan, Prentice Capital invested $20 million into KB Toys. Gregory R. Staley, a former president for Toys "R" Us' U.S. and international units, was named as KB Toys' new chief executive officer. The company had 640 stores. In August 2007, the company announced a business strategy that included layoffs at its headquarters in Pittsfield, Massachusetts. That November, the company had 566 stores and began closing 122 of them.

Because of poor sales at its mall-based locations, as well as competition, the company filed for Chapter 11 bankruptcy on December 11, 2008. The chain began going-out-of-business sales that month. At the time, the company had 10,850 employees, including approximately 6,500 seasonal workers. The company had 277 mall locations, 114 KB Toy Outlet stores, 40 KB Toy Works stores, and 30 KB Toys Holiday stores, for a total of 461. It was the largest mall-based toy retailer in the United States at the time, operating in 44 states, as well as Guam and Puerto Rico. It was also the second-oldest operating toy retailer in North America (behind FAO Schwarz) before its demise. The store-closing sales (as well as the termination of the company's website) were concluded on February 9, 2009.

The KB Toys brand and related intangible assets were sold by Streambank LLC to Toys "R" Us on September 4, 2009, for a reported $2.1 million (~$3.06 million in 2025). Because KB Toys' stores had been closed and liquidated, the sale applied mainly to the company's logo, website, trademarks, and other intellectual properties. Toys "R" Us was initially unsure of how to integrate the KB name into its business plan. Toys "R" Us has used the KB Toys name on self-manufactured toys under the name "KB Classics" with the KB Toys logo.

=== Cancelled revival ===
Strategic Marks, LLC, a company that buys and revives defunct brands, registered a trademark for KB Toys in 2016, after Toys "R" Us allowed the previous registration to lapse. In March 2018, Strategic Marks founder Ellia Kassoff stated that due to Toys "R" Us going out of business in the United States, Strategic Marks planned to open 1,000 KB Toys pop-up stores across America for Black Friday (November 2018). After the holiday season, Kassoff would decide which stores would then become permanent. In early November 2018, Kasoff announced that the relaunch would be delayed until 2019, allowing the company to begin with "as few missteps as possible". Kasoff stated that the delay would "give us plenty of time to build out the most optimum supply chain, distribution and retail infrastructure our customers deserve." Prior to the delay, there had been plans to open 400 to 600 seasonal pop-up stores in 2018, and 600 to 800 permanent stores within three to four years. In March 2019, Kasoff cited a lack of funding as the reason that the pop-up stores did not open as planned. He stated, "The toy companies had lots of conflicts of interest that prevented them from investing in KB given that they sell to other retailers, and mall operators don't typically invest in prospective tenants. It is taking a while to get this done and build out a strategy. Once we get the money together we will be off and running." Strategic Marks sought an investment bank to finance the opening of 200 to 250 temporary KB Toys stores, which would determine whether permanent locations would be viable. Another possible reason why the revival never fully materialized is because Strategic Marks failed to renew the trademark for KB Toys in 2020. Because of this, the trademark would become a 606 trademark, meaning that all of the KB Toys trademarks are abandoned.

== Lawsuits ==
In December 1999, The Equal Rights Center (TERC) and two black customers filed a federal lawsuit against KB Toys over one of the company's policies in which personal checks could not be used to pay for purchases at certain stores that experienced unusually high rates of returned checks. TERC alleged that KB Toys' policy was discriminatory against black people, stating that the policy was enforced at eight stores in predominantly black neighborhoods located in the Baltimore–Washington metropolitan area. KB Toys denied the allegation, and stated that racial demographics were not a consideration when enacting the policy 13 years earlier. The company further stated that checks from white people were also not accepted at the stores specified in the lawsuit. By March 2000, the lawsuit had been amended to include three additional black plaintiffs, and the suit sought damages as well as an end to the company's check-writing policy. In January 2001, a U.S. District judge removed TERC from the case as it was not affected by KB Toys' check-writing policy. The lawsuit was resolved in favor of KB Toys in 2003.

In 2001, the district attorney for Napa County, California filed a lawsuit alleging that KB Toys misrepresented sale prices and that it sold returned items as new. The case was settled in August 2003 for $1.2 million (~$2.01 million in 2025). In 2003, a class action lawsuit was filed in Chicago against KB Toys, alleging that the company's stores engaged in using deceptive price tags to manipulate consumers into believing that they were buying products at a discounted price. The lawsuit was settled with KB Toys providing a one-week 30 percent discount on purchases of $30 or more.
