= Sears Puerto Rico =

Subsidiary of the Sears chain of department stores

Sears de Puerto Rico
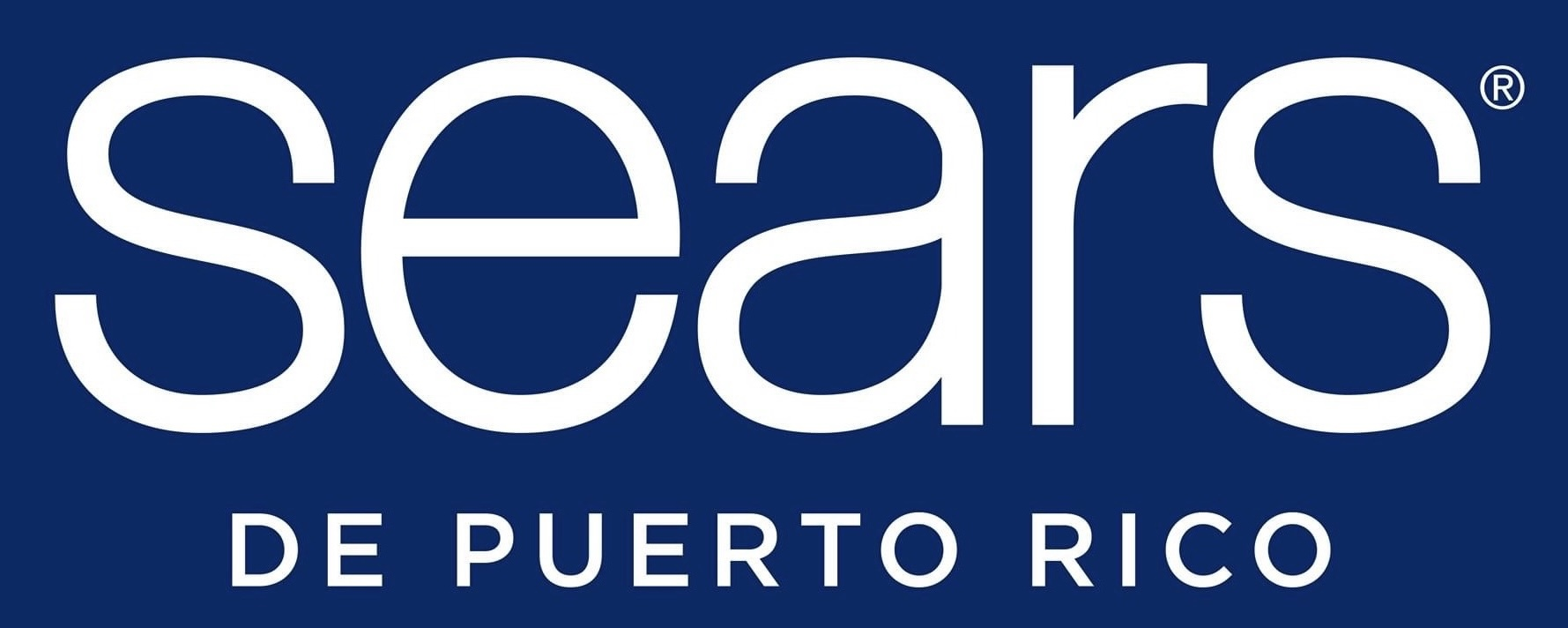

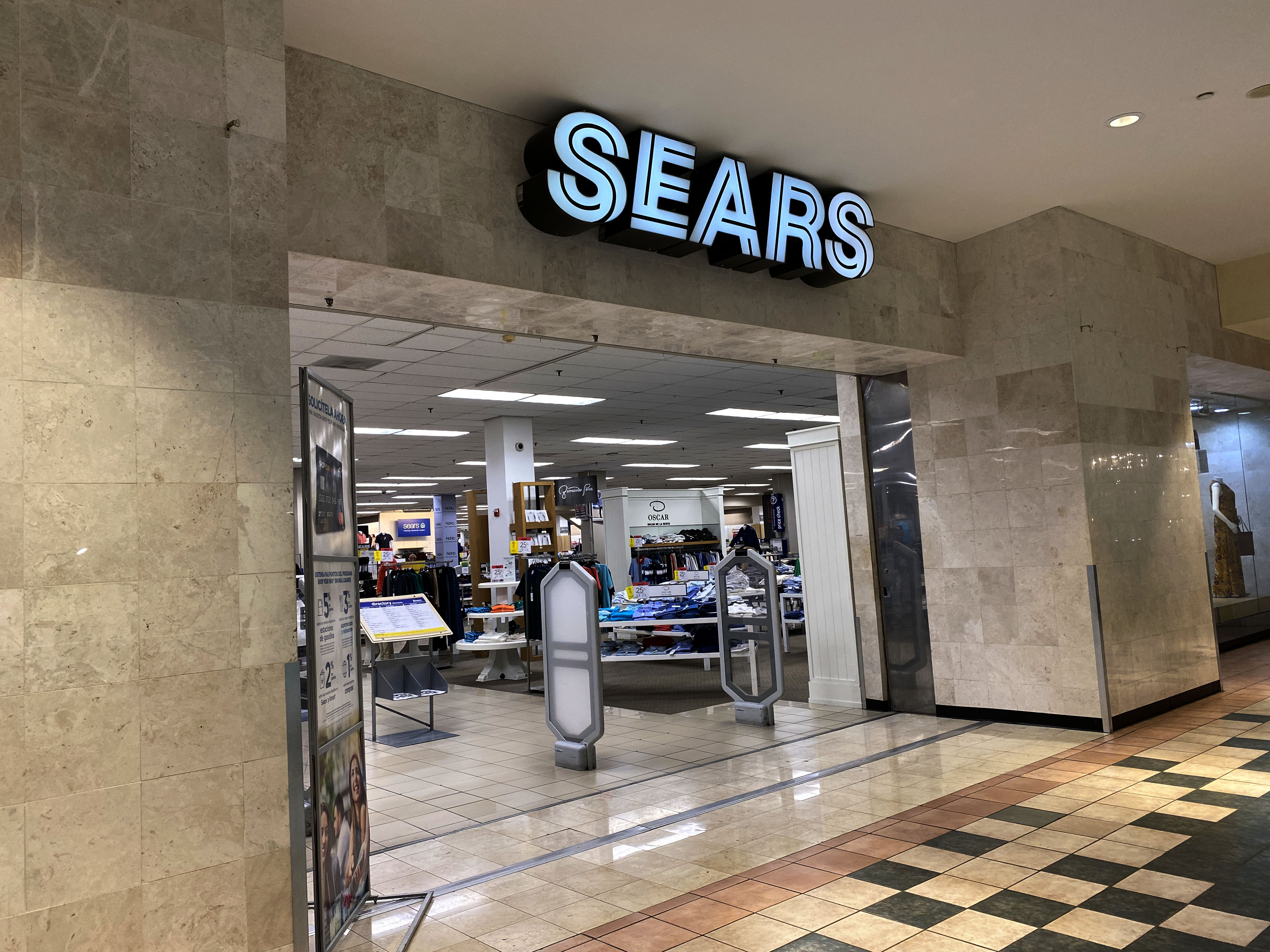
- Mall entrance to the last Sears store in Puerto Rico at the Plaza las Américas shopping mall in San Juan, in 2020
- Type: Subsidiary
- Industry: Retail
- Founded: 15 September 1937; 89 years ago
- Defunct: 31 August 2025; 14 months ago
- Fate: Bankruptcy and liquidation
- Headquarters: San Juan, Puerto Rico
- Number of locations: 0 (As of 31 August 2025)
- Area served: Puerto Rico, US Virgin Islands
- Revenue: US$350,000,000+(2006)
- Total assets: US$19,982,740.00 (2019)
- Total equity: US$25,064,719.00 (2019)
- Number of employees: 3,000+ (2006)
- Parent: Sears Roebuck and Company
- Website: searspr.com

Sears Roebuck de Puerto Rico, Inc., or simply Sears de Puerto Rico, was a subsidiary of Sears based in Puerto Rico and the United States Virgin Islands. The division was founded in 1961, as a subsidiary to the main Sears Roebuck and Company. The company's line of business included the retail sale of general lines of apparel such as suits, coats, dresses, and home furnishings. Sears Roebuck and Company established itself in Puerto Rico in 1937, opening a catalogue store that year. At its peak, Sears had 10+ locations on the island. The last Sears store open in the island at the Plaza Las Américas shopping mall closed on August 31, 2025.

Despite the last Sears store in Puerto Rico having shut down, the Sears Puerto Rico website is still up as of February 7, 2026.

== History ==
=== Beginnings ===
On August 3, 1937, it was reported that A. W. McClosay and R. E. Paonessa had arrived at the island, accompanied by their respective wives. McClosay and Paonessa were senior officials of the Sears Roebuck and Company, of the United States, and had come to the island with the purpose of opening an office and showroom for a large part of the products sold by said company at the time through their catalogue business. Sears in this way wanted to strengthen the relationship between them and its clients on the island.

On September 15, 1937, the first Sears Roebuck and Company catalogue store on the island would open in San Juan, the capital city of Puerto Rico. By the 1940s, more catalogue stores had opened on the island, being located in the cities of Ponce, Mayagüez and in the town of Fajardo.

On January 18, 1951, it was reported that a new catalogue store had opened in the city of Caguas. Around two thousand people would attend the inauguration of the Sears that would be established at Muñoz Rivera Street, several demonstrations were made in relation to different household items. The officials from the headquarters at the time in Philadelphia, present at the Inauguration ceremony, were very pleased with the interest shown by the public in the demonstrations offered, during which many people placed their orders with the company.

On May 30, 1951, it was reported that as of June of that year, the town of Río Piedras would have a new catalogue store which would be inaugurated in said town on the occasion of the sixty-fifth anniversary of the initiation of the company's businesses. The new catalogue store, according to Mr. Antonio Franco, then administrator of Sears on the Island, would be the most elaborate of all of the company's catalogue stores in Puerto Rico at the time.

On August 7, 1954, Sears would announce the inauguration of its new location in the town of Vega Baja in Puerto Nuevo. By the late 1950s, Sears locations had opened in Santurce and Caparra Terrace in San Juan.

=== Incorporation, expanding and success ===
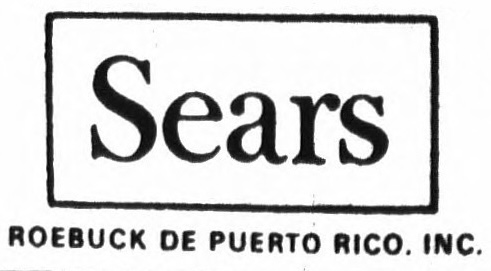
Logo used from 1966 to 1984

On January 31, 1961, Sears Roebuck and Company announced the formation of a new local wholly owned Latin American subsidiary Sears Roebuck de Puerto Rico, Inc., which initially would operate six existing stores, five in Puerto Rico, and one in the St. Thomas, Virgin Islands.

On November 1, 1962, the first full-size Sears department store on the island would open in San Juan, Hato Rey, the 2,500 parking spaces surrounding the building being filled to capacity. The new store would open with 77,000 square-feet of sales space and would be the largest of eight retail units at the time operated by the Sears subsidiary, Sears Roebuck de Puerto Rico, Inc. Through the rest of the 1960s the chain would continue to expand opening a store in Ponce in 1964, Caguas in 1966, Arecibo in 1967, and Bayamón in 1968 at the Santa Rosa Plaza shopping center.

On October 4, 1972, a new Sears store would be inaugurated at the Mayagüez Mall in the city of Mayagüez. According to reports, the Sears store, which was one of the first to open its doors at the mall, had extraordinary sales that broke all previous records at the time.

On June 10, 1975, it was reported that management of the Sears store chain had set the goal of opening two new stores in Puerto Rico for the year 1978. According to Robert B. Gibson, then president of Sears Roebuck of Puerto Rico, Inc., Sears management was in negotiations with the management of Plaza Las Americas, Inc., owners of the Plaza Las Américas shopping mall in Hato Rey for the construction of a new Sears store in that center. The store would be similar in size to those that Sears operated at the time in Hato Rey and Bayamón, and would be located in an extension of Plaza las Américas, towards the north side of the shopping center. The new store would have around 300,000 square feet of sales, office and warehouse space, covering approximately 135,000 square feet in sales space. The other store that Sears was planning to build was the one that would be located in the Plaza Carolina shopping mall, which the firm IBEC Realty Company had plans to build towards the south of the Villa Fontana Urbanization, in front of 65 Infantería Avenue, in the Carolina area. This would be smaller than the others in the chain on the Island, and would be located in the largest shopping center in Puerto Rico when it would be built. Gibson said that there were still no calculations on the investment that these two new Sears stores on the Island would represent, and mentioned that negotiations for the development of the store in Plaza las Américas were well advanced.

On February 11, 1978, it was reported that the honorable Mayor of San Juan, Dr. Hernán Padilla would cut the opening ribbon of the new Sears store in Plaza Las Américas during the ceremony that would take place that Monday, February 12 at 9:30 am. The Sears store in Plaza Las Américas would be a very different concept from the Hato Rey store that Sears had occupied since 1962. Located at the north end of the Mall with about 240,000 square feet of total area, it was 80% larger than the Hato Rey store. Mr. John P. Simpson Jr., then manager of the Sears store in Plaza Las Américas, reported that the architects responsible for the design were Eduardo Molinari y Asociados. The Shopping Center's large parking lot with capacity for 6,000 cars and the new structure with 800 additional spaces, which connects to the store on the second level, would be of great convenience for customers. In addition to entering the store from the parking area, you could enter from inside the mall. The store consisted of over 50 merchandise departments, in addition it included a restaurant; Customer Service Center for the purchase of traveler's checks, money orders, for the payment of water, electricity and telephone bills, gift wrapping; a catalog order department; a "Key Shop", watch repair, photography studio, optical department, beauty salon, and pharmacy. One of the great attractions of the new store was also its 40,000 square-foot automotive center, which was equipped to service 30 cars simultaneously. That same year on October 9, 1978, the Sears store located in the Plaza Carolina shopping mall would also be officially inaugurated.

On December 28, 1978, the president of Sears Roebuck de Puerto Rico, Inc. at the time, R. B. Gibson, announced the final closing of the Sears store in Hato Rey which had already begun. Gibson said that all the merchandise in the Hato Rey store would be sold because they we didn't want to move any merchandise to the new store in Plaza las Américas. The liquidation would include not only the merchandise, but also the shelves, office equipment and articles shop decorations. "The decision to close Hato Rey and move to Plaza was a very difficult one to make, as our Hato Rey store has always been one of the most successful stores in the entire organization; however, the continued increase in sales of said store required moving to Plaza Las Américas, where we will be able to serve our customers with approximately fifty percent more sales space," added Gibson at the time.

On November 27, 1981, a new Sears store would open at the Arecibo Mall in the city of Arecibo.

=== Expanding and success, "The Store of the Future" ===
On September 15, 1985, it was reported that the Sears store in Plaza Las Américas had undergone a major remodeling and conversion to a new display format. Mr. Paul Brierre, then store manager, reported that after six months of construction, Sears at Plaza Las Américas joined a growing list of Sears stores with the new display system called "The Store of the Future." Mr. Brierre said the 1985 program represented the second of five years it would take to carry out the remodeling and expansion of 600 stores and the construction of 62 new stores, with a total investment of $1.7 billion. Mr. Brierre added that Sears' strategy was to create an innovative environment that encouraged customers to examine and purchase a broader assortment of merchandise, including more clothing, sports goods and loungewear. "To date the results have been very good," he said. "Customer reaction has been excellent."

On June 17, 1990, it was reported that Sears Roebuck de Puerto Rico had announced the opening of Sears Brand Central, a new store concept, which there were plans to expand and open multiple of these stores on the island.

On November 9, 1992, a new Sears store would open at the Plaza del Caribe shopping mall in the city of Ponce. This same year another Sears store would open at the Plaza del Norte shopping mall in the city of Hatillo.

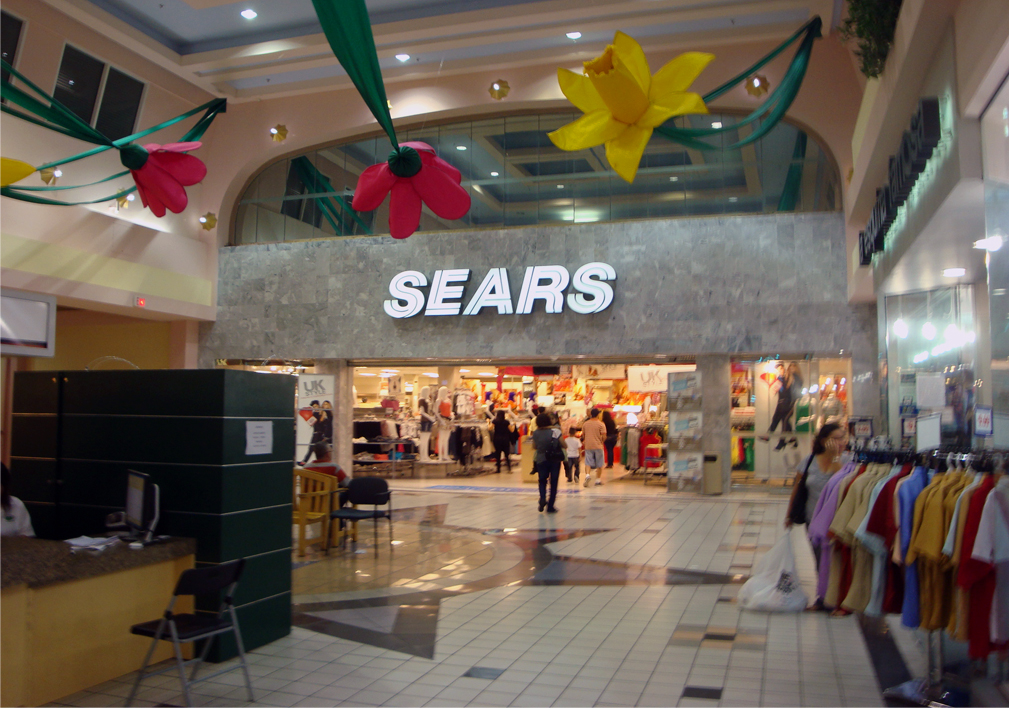
Mall entrance to the Sears store at Plaza del Norte in Hatillo, in 2011

On October 25, 1995, it was reported that Pier 1 Imports had announced an agreement with Sears Roebuck de Puerto Rico to open six Pier 1 stores inside Sears' department stores on the island. The new Pier 1 stores would have 2,000–3,000 square-feet of sales space. The first two were scheduled to open in November of that year in the Sears store in Plaza las Américas in San Juan, and in the Sears Homelife store in the Galería Paseos shopping mall in Cupey. Sears at the time had 10 department stores on the island. Sears and Pier 1 had introduced the store-within-a-store concept in 1993 in Sears’ Mexico stores.

During the mid to late 1990s, Sears' expansion on the island was completed with an investment of more than $21 million, enabling the local operation to expand its local footprint considerably. This would include the opening of a Sears Brand Central in the former two-story Velasco location at the Plaza Las Américas shopping mall after the department store chain had closed in 1995. From 1993 to 1999, Sears grew from four to 10 in locations and more than doubled its square footage on the island.

On January 24, 1999, it was reported that the Sears store at the Plaza las Américas shopping mall in San Juan had sold more than any other Sears store in the world.

On August 7, 2003, it was reported that traffic and sales at Sears had beat those of the same period last year by slightly more than 10%, said Gary Salvatore, president of local operations. He also said that the Puerto Rico district with 10 stores at the time enjoyed the best overall performance of the entire 63 districts in the nation in 2002. As a result of such success, he did not dismiss the possibility of Sears opening more stores locally, also mentioning that Puerto Rico had been among the top performing districts for many years. But besides being the top-performing district, Puerto Rico also accounted for one of the highest credit penetration markets in the chain. In addition, it was also the district enjoying the highest customer satisfaction in the chain, according to Salvatore. In reference to opening more Sears stores on the island, he said "It depends on real estate opportunities. We're just looking at the moment." Salvatore said the key to Sears' success locally had been its effort to adapt to the local market and local consumers' tastes. "This is very important if a business is to be successful in such a competitive market as this one." Sears' local operations had gross sales of $400 million in 2001.

On May 13, 2004, it was reported that with a $1.5 million investment, Sears Roebuck de Puerto Rico was transforming three former Western Auto stores in San Juan, Ponce, and Mayaguez into Sears Automotive Centers for reopening in mid-June of that year. In 1988, stateside chain Advance Auto Parts had paid Sears $1.8 million in cash and 40% of its stock for Western Auto. In 1995, five of the six Sears Automotive Centers on the island were converted into Western Auto stores. "After a nine-year absence from the local market, an automotive center bearing the Sears name will open this spring, offering customers quality tires, major-brand batteries such as DieHard, and other related services," said Sears Roebuck de Puerto Rico President Gary Salvatore. Salvatore said the move was a response to local customers' constant requests for the return of Sears Auto Centers. The first store that was slated to reopen as a Sears Auto Center was at Plaza Las Américas. The 26,000 square-foot freestanding building would have an expanded 5,000 square-feet of retail space and 26 service bays. The 14,000 square-foot auto center in Ponce's Plaza Caribe Mall would have a 1,700 square-foot retail area and 11 service bays. The one at the Mayaguez Mall would have 16,000 square-feet, including 2,500 square-feet of retail space, and 12 service bays. The three Sears Auto Centers would have a combined 130 employees, noted Salvatore. All were Slated to open in June of that year, when Salvatore's replacement would be announced. Salvatore, who had 34 years of service with the department store, had recently been promoted to vice president in charge of the southeast region, based out of Sears' headquarters in Hoffman States, III. The southeast region included all Sears operations from Richmond, Va., to Miami.

On June 5, 2005, it was reported that Sears Essentials, the new concept that was arising from the $11 billion Sears/Kmart merger, was sure to open in Puerto Rico the following year. Already, eight to 10 Kmart locations had been identified, according to Ted Wells, then president of Sears Holding Co. in Puerto Rico, who added that the stores' conversion to the new concept would probably take place in spring 2006. Kmart and Sears stores were expected to continue operating as they were, said Wells, adding that Puerto Rico was a great market for both brands at the time. Sears operated 10 stores in Puerto Rico with $400 million in gross sales for 2003 and Kmart had 21, with an estimated $350 million in gross sales for 2003. Both retailers combined employed more than 4,000 locals, as reported in the 2005 Caribbean Business Book of Lists.

On September 27, 2007, it was reported that Sears de Puerto Rico operated 10 Sears company-owned stores: three Sears dealer stores in Aguadilla, Barranquitas and San Sebastián; one outlet store in Cupey and three Automotive Centers, spin offs of their predecessor Western Auto. The three local dealer stores operated much like licensed locations using the Sears name, subject to space considerations, each carried the same company merchandise. Sears' Automotive Centers were in Plaza Las Américas, Ponce's Plaza del Caribe and the Mayagüez Mall. Combined, the local Sears operation which continuously ranked among the chain's top three markets battling the first place on and off with the Hawaii market generated an estimated $350 million-plus in annual sales and employed more than 3,000 people, according to 2006 Caribbean Business Book of Lists.

On February 5, 2009, it was reported that Sears was seeking to expand its local operation through the opening of Sears Hometown Stores in Cayey, Yauco and Humacao. Each location, which would run like a franchise owned and operated store, would be integrated within the rest of the island's Sears network. Estimated initial investment for a new Sears Hometown Store ranged from $50,000 to $70,000 and helped create 100 new jobs per location. Sears assigned a regional development manager to promote sales of Sears Hometown Stores in Puerto Rico. The format, based on its size and minimal start-up costs, could represent a good business opportunity for many entrepreneurs, the Sears manager said. Sears, which was evaluating interested candidates, offered local entrepreneurs the opportunity to own their own store. It was dubbed as one of the fastest-growing formats in retail, Sears Hometown Stores were smaller in size than the usual anchor-tenant location, ranging from 5,000 to 8,000 square feet. At the time having recently celebrated its 70th anniversary in Puerto Rico, Sears Holdings now operated 23 Kmart and 14 Sears stores on the island.

On March 12, 2009, it was reported that Sears, the island's oldest department store at the time, continued its expansion with the opening of its newest dealer store in the town of Toa Baja, on Rd. 2, in the Candelaria Ward. The Toa Baja Sears Hometown Store would be one of several that Sears planned to open around the island.

=== Decline, downsizing and eventual final store closure ===
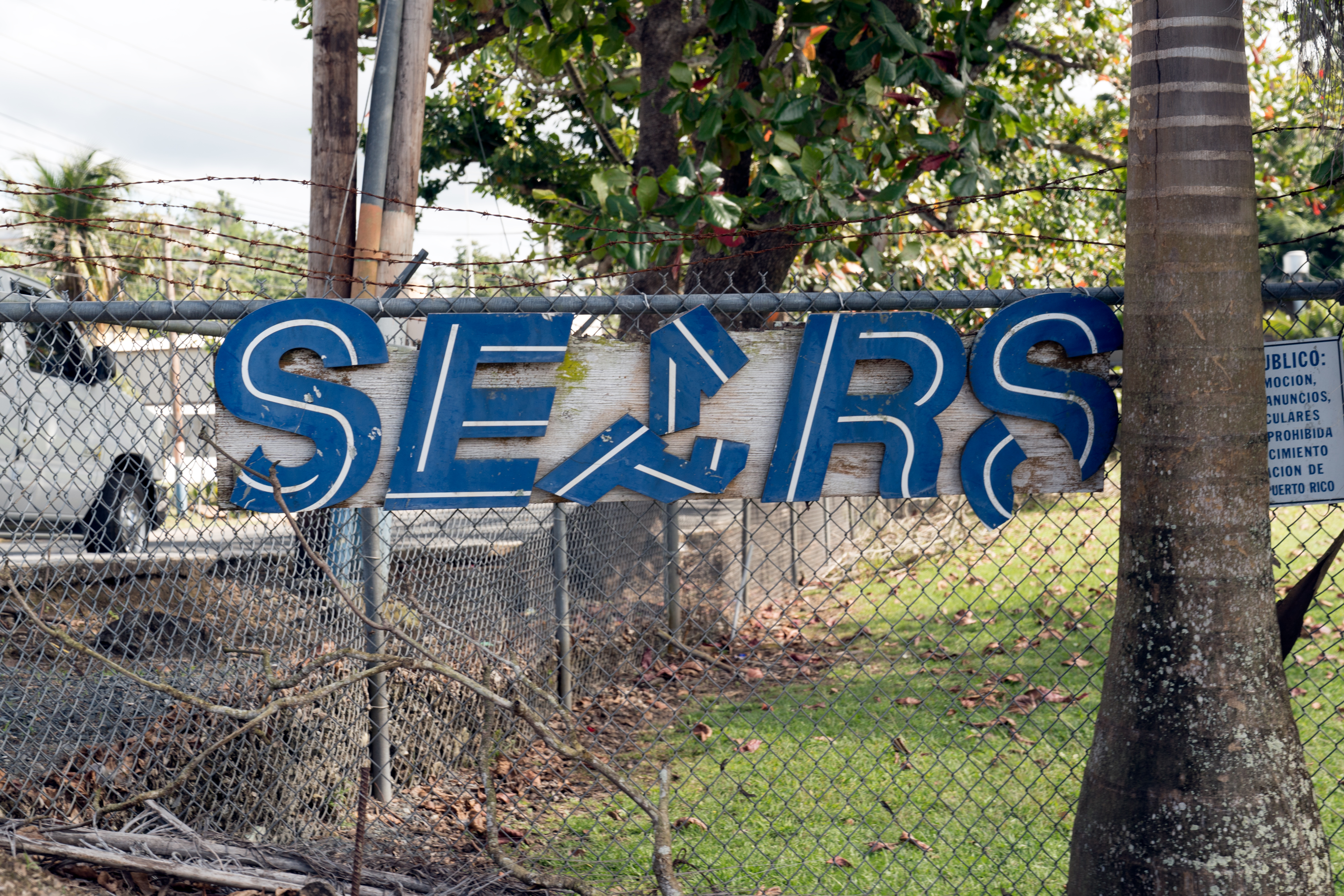
Damaged Sears sign in Puerto Rico, in 2018, representative of decline

In July 2015, Sears Holdings spun off 235 of its properties, this included all Sears and Kmart locations in Puerto Rico into a new REIT called Seritage Growth Properties.

On March 4, 2016, it was reported that Sears had confirmed that one of its stores on the Island would be ceasing operations for the month of May of that year. This was the Sears store at the Galería Paseos in San Juan, which was one of the anchor businesses in the shopping mall. Dave Rodney, president of the Sears and Kmart chains for Puerto Rico and the Virgin Islands, pointed out that the lease contract for the premises had expired and the corporation decided not to renew it. The executive did not specify the reasons for this, but said that in these cases the company took into account, among other factors, how the business was going, the requests of the property owner and the situation of the economy. The final closing of said store would be on May 31, but as soon as that following Friday, March 11, the inventory liquidation sale would begin. The Galería Paseos store employed 35 people.

On May 25, 2018, it was reported that Sears was to open a new location on the first floor of the Santa Rosa Mall, which would serve temporarily until the original store would be planned to reopen in early 2019. This was for the purpose of covering the needs in Bayamón and adjacent municipalities due to the reconstruction of the original Sears store. This temporary store had 12,000 square-feet of sales area and would offer around 20 jobs.

On November 24, 2018, it was reported that as part of the bankruptcy process it had filed for that last month, Sears Holdings presented the list of stores that were for sale. The document included all the locations they had in Puerto Rico. According to publications specialized in economic issues, the stores that were on the sale list were not exempt from closure. In Puerto Rico the company had about 27 stores between Sears and Kmart.

On April 23, 2019, it was reported that the reopening of the Sears store in the Santa Rosa Mall in the city of Bayamón was in danger, as the store had remained closed since the Hurricane Maria in 2017. Sears had spent $3 million cleaning up the structure at Santa Rosa Mall, and had begun rebuilding the roof, but stopped work when the parent company Sears Holdings filed for bankruptcy in October 2018. Everything indicated that some 21 Sears and Kmart stores could continue operations in Puerto Rico after being saved from bankruptcy by Edward Lampert. However, the Sears store at the Santa Rosa Mall did not suffer the same fate, as it was not on the list of properties for which Lampert assumed the contract.

On August 30, 2019, it was reported that the company Transformco had announced the closure of some Kmart and Sears stores in Puerto Rico. This included the Sears Auto Center located at the Santa Rosa Mall in the city of Bayamón. Liquidation sales were expected to begin in mid-September and stores were expected to close in mid-December.

On November 6, 2019, the company TransformCo, owner of Sears and Kmart stores, announced the closure of eight Kmart and Sears stores in Puerto Rico. The announced closure included the Sears stores in Fajardo, Plaza del Caribe in Ponce, and the Céntrico shopping mall in Guayama which would all cease operations. Liquidation sales were expected to begin in November, extending through February.

On December 15, 2020, it was reported that two Sears stores would closing, the Sears store in the Las Catalinas Mall in Caguas, and the Sears store in the Plaza Carolina Mall in Carolina. Both stores would cease operations by February 2021.

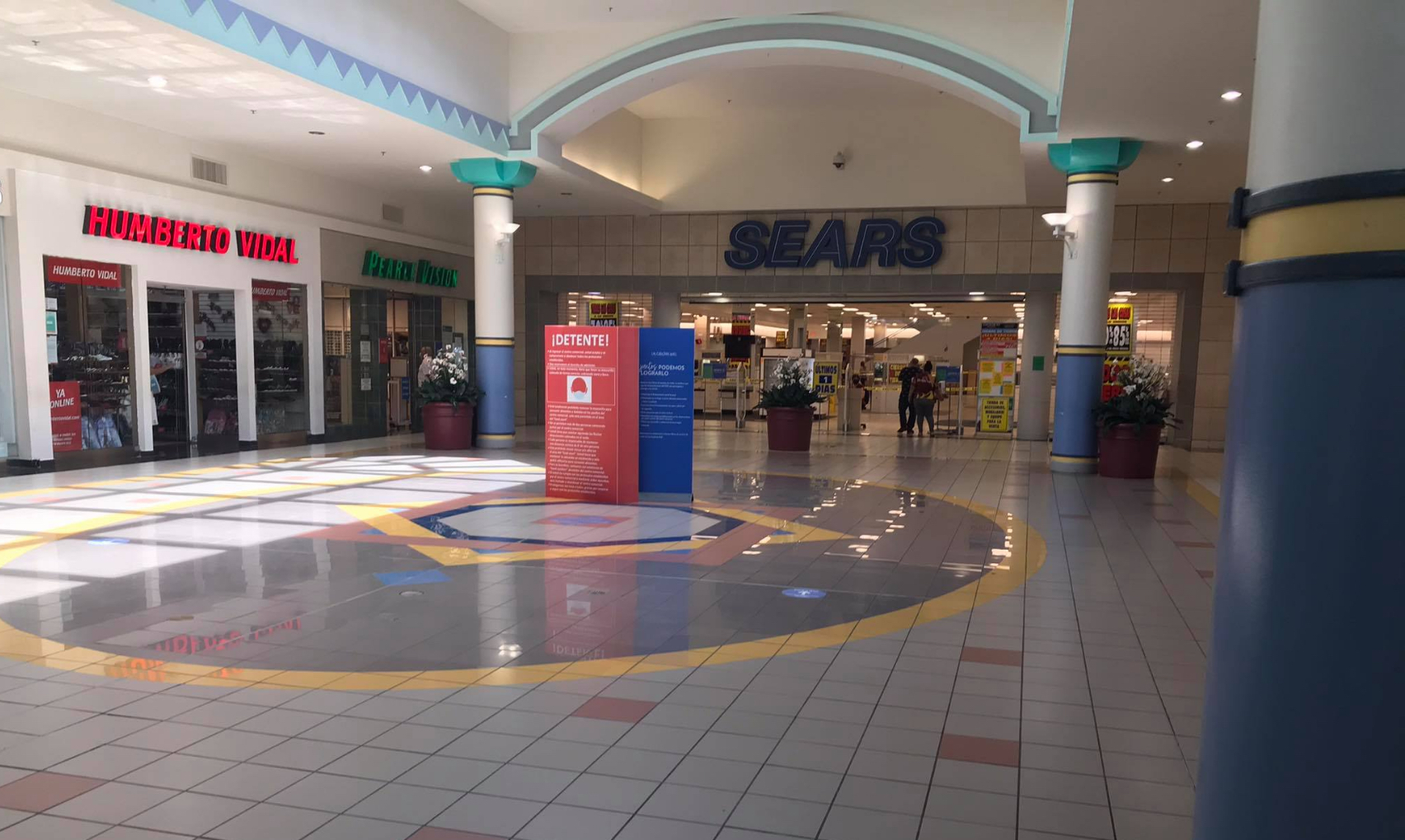
Mall entrance to the Sears store at Las Catalinas Mall in Caguas during liquidation, in 2021

On February 3, 2021, it was reported that four Sears stores in Puerto Rico would be closing, this included the Sears stores in Plaza del Norte in Hatillo, and in the Mayagüez Mall in Mayagüez.

On April 20, 2021, it was reported that two of the last Sears stores still standing in Puerto Rico had finally closed their doors permanently: Mayagüez Mall and Plaza del Norte in Hatillo. The closure of the Sears at the Mayagüez Mall had occurred at 2:00 p.m., long before the mall had ceased operations for the day. In Plaza del Norte in Hatillo the chain had also closed its doors permanently. After 4:00 p.m., people still came to shop, but found the doors closed and the space empty, with no merchandise.

On January 5, 2023, it was reported that Sears Hometown after filing for Chapter 11 bankruptcy protection a month earlier was closing all of its 115 stores. Liquidation sales were underway at the Sears Hometown stores in Puerto Rico of which were included in the closures.

On July 27, 2023, it was reported that Sears was seeking to win back the Puerto Rican consumer. The two Sears stores in Plaza Las Américas, the only ones that remain open in Puerto Rico, would add new brands and products, with the aim of once again attracting consumer support. The brand, once a retail icon, is trying to reinvent itself and is even talking about reopening more stores. Ramón Márquez, Head of Operations and Marketing at TransformCo, a company that acquired the assets of Sears and Kmart in 2019, indicated that as part of the transformation strategy, Sears developed "strategic alliances with important and significant brands for the local market, with in order to strengthen their connection with the public and offer them new options". It was mentioned that in the Sears Brand Central at Plaza las Américas they would add "an impressive selection of high-quality appliances" and well-known brands in Puerto Rico. The chain made an alliance with the company The Shack, specialized in beach items, which would also be available at Brand Central. It was asked if with these changes, the Sears furniture department which had reopened in 2022 would move to the Brand Central store, and if TransformCo's plan was to keep both stores open. The executive responded that the furniture department would continue to operate on the third level of the main store. And he assured that both stores would remain in operation and with a greater variety of merchandise. It was also stated that Sears plans to open more stores in Puerto Rico and in the United States. When inquiring in which other parts of the island the company plans to start operations, it was indicated that TransformCo still has six properties in the local market, and it could be in any of them. One of the stores that TransformCo still has on the island is the space that the old Sears occupied in Mayagüez Mall. It was reported that the chain would launch an advertising campaign called "Rediscover Sears" that would premiere at the "Food Fest" event in Plaza las Américas in that August.

On October 4, 2024, it was reported that the 50,000 square foot two-level Sears Brand Central & Home Improvement store in Plaza las Américas had closed. The store started its liquidation on the 1st of that month, by the 4th the store had closed, the rest of its merchandise being moved to the main Sears store at the mall.

On July 9, 2025, it was announced the last Sears store open in Puerto Rico would be closing its doors by August of that year. Edwin Tavárez, general manager of the Plaza Las Américas mall, told in a written statement that Sears had approached Plaza Las Américas management to discuss the transfer of the department store space. “Out of respect for the internal processes of our tenant of more than 40 years, we prefer that Sears be the one to express its opinion regarding the handover and closure of its business,” he said. “We are deeply saddened by this situation, primarily because of the impact it has on its customers and employees. However, the Sears store at Plaza Las Américas was one of the last remaining in operation in its entire chain, so we thank Sears for its patronage and efforts.” Tavárez emphasized.

== Locations ==
Sears Roebuck de Puerto Rico, Inc. has had various types of locations on the island, ranging from catalogue stores, full-size department stores, smaller dealer stores, and others.

=== Catalogue stores ===
- Viejo San Juan, Calle Luna, Esq. San Justo – (opened 1937)
- Fajardo
- Ponce, Esq. Sol
- Mayagüez, Méndez Vigo, Esq. Luna
- Caguas, Muñoz Rivera Street – (opened 1951)
- Río Piedras, Calle Georgetti – (opened 1951)
- Vega Baja, Puerto Nuevo, Ave. Central, Ave. San Fernando – (opened 1954)
- Santurce, Ave. Ponce de León
- Caparra Terrace, Bioque KA-2

=== Full-size department stores ===
- Hato Rey, San Juan – (1962–1978)
- Ponce, Esq. Ferrocarril y Concordia – (1964–1992)
- Caguas, Gautier Benítez, Barbosa y Cristóbal Colón – (1966–1997)
- Arecibo, Arecibo Shopping Center – (1967–1992)
- Bayamón, Santa Rosa Plaza – (1968–2017)
- Mayagüez, Mayagüez Mall – (1972–2021)
- Hato Rey, San Juan, Plaza Las Américas – (1978-2025)
- Carolina, Plaza Carolina – (1978–2021)
- Ponce, Plaza del Caribe – (1992–2020)
- Hatillo, Plaza del Norte – (1992–2021)
- Guayama, Plaza Guayama/Céntrico – (1992–2020)
- San Juan, Cupey, Galería Paseos – (1994–2016)
- Caguas, Las Catalinas Mall – (1997–2021)
- Fajardo, Del Este Shopping Center – (closed 2020)

==== Brand Central/Homelife ====
- Hato Rey, San Juan, Plaza Las Américas (Brand Central) – (1996-2024)
- Ponce, Plaza del Caribe (Brand Central) – (1996-2020)
- Mayagüez, Mayagüez Mall (Brand Central) – (closed 2021)
- San Juan, Cupey, Galería Paseos (Homelife) – (1994–2018)

=== Dealer stores ===
==== Sears Hometown ====
- Cayey – (2009–2017)
- Yauco – (2009–???)
- Humacao – (2009–2022)
- Toa Baja – (2009–2022)
- Bayamón – (closed 2022)
- Manatí
- San Sebastián – (closed 2022)
- Aguadilla – (2009-2021)
- Barranquitas
- Isabela – (closed 2019)

==== Other ====
- Arecibo, Arecibo Mall – (opened 1981)
- Vega Alta, Centro Gran Caribe
- Guaynabo (Sears Parts & Service)
- Cupey (Sears Outlet) – (closed 2019)

== See also ==
- Sears
- Sears (Mexico)
