= Santa Rosa Mall =

Santa Rosa Mall can refer to the following:

- Santa Rosa Mall (Florida) in Mary Esther, Florida
- Santa Rosa Mall (Puerto Rico) in Bayamón, Puerto Rico
- Santa Rosa Plaza in Santa Rosa, California
