= González Padín =

Defunct chain of high-end department stores in Puerto Rico

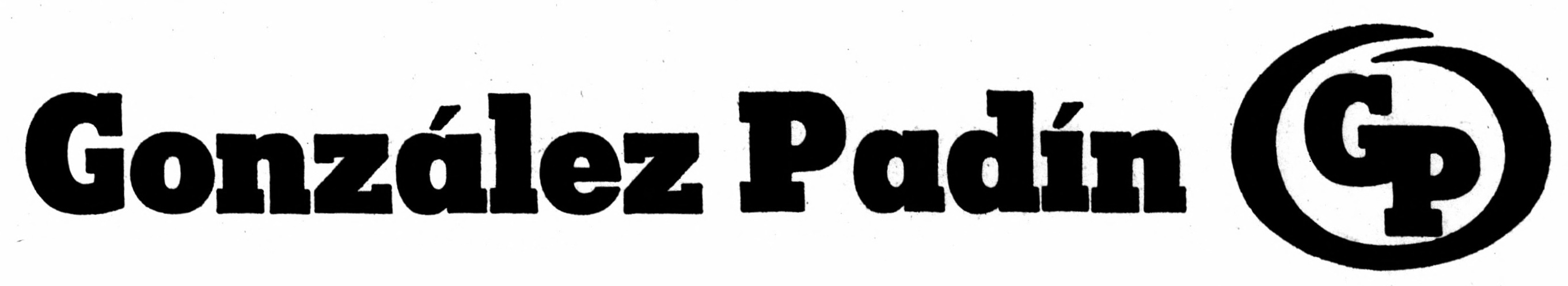

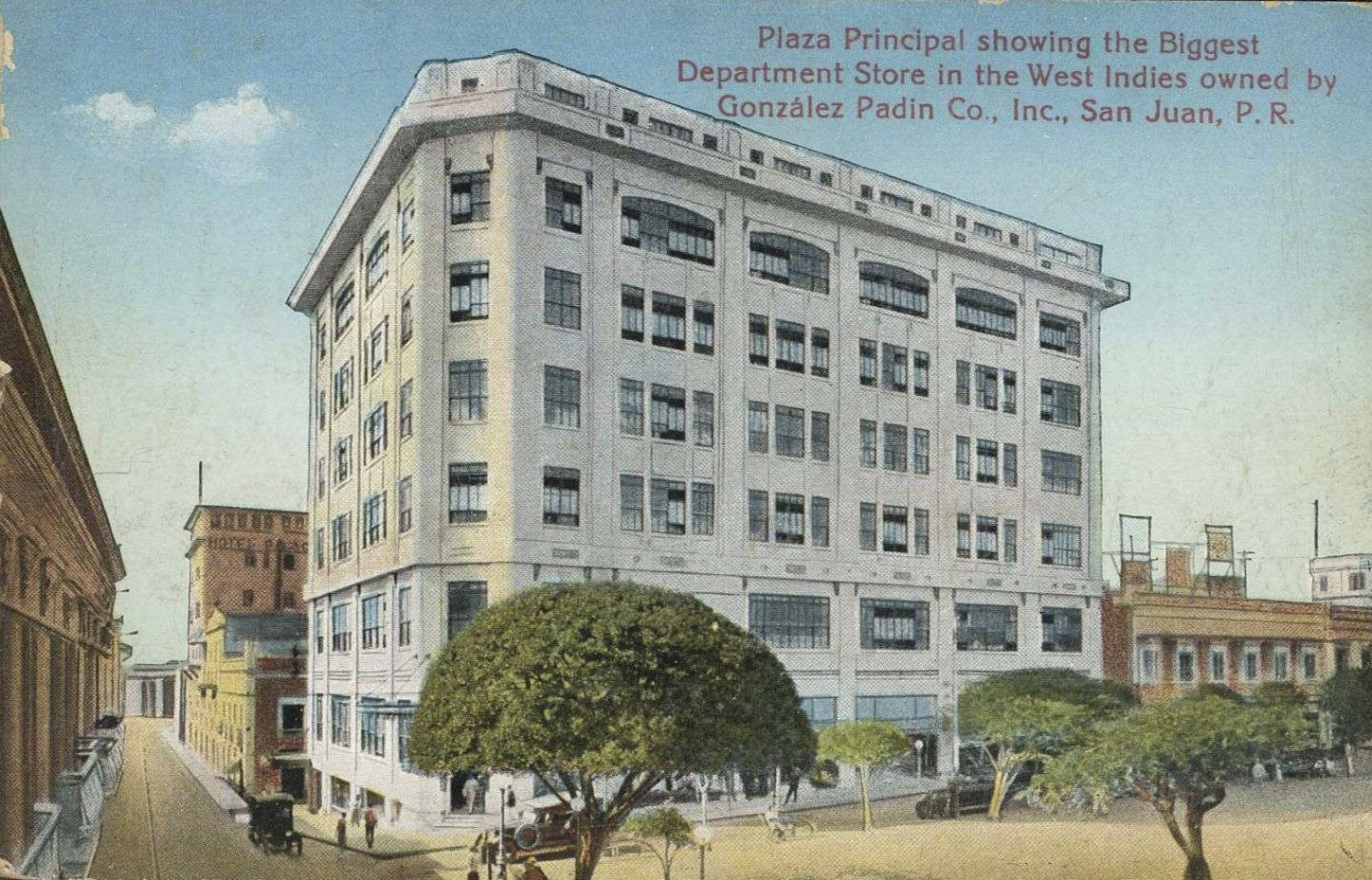
- Post card of flagship store in San Juan, Puerto Rico from 1923
- Type: Department store
- Industry: Retail
- Founded: October 1884; 142 years ago
- Founder: Jose González Padín
- Defunct: 1995; 31 years ago
- Fate: Dissolved
- Headquarters: San Juan, Puerto Rico
- Number of locations: 10 (at peak)
- Revenue: $65 million (1994)
- Owner: González Padín & Co.
- Number of employees: 1,000 (1995)

González Padín was a high-end department store based in San Juan, Puerto Rico. The chain which operated in Puerto Rico at its peak had 10 stores. The chain closed in 1995, and at the time of closure it was the biggest and oldest department store on the island.

== History ==
=== Origins ===
In October 1884, José González Padín, an enterprising merchant, Spanish by birth, opened a jewelry store in a location on Calle Fortaleza at Old San Juan. Fortaleza Street was considered the commercial center of Old San Juan. A few years later, Don Jose González Padín became associated with his brother, Don Anselmo González Padín, who joined the business with the Padin brothers' nephews. They were these, Don Anselmo Lores and Don Fernando Fernández, together with Don Manuel Alvarez Santos and Don Angel Rolan, who gave impetus to the business. As the business continued to grow, the original facade was modernized and was expanded to the top floor of the building it occupied. Thus becoming the first González Padín store featuring large glass windows: in those days it was considered a revolution in the construction of commercial facades. For this reason it was baptized by the public as "the glass corner.” Cash registers were added, and it now had, its main attraction, the first electrical advertisement in any store in Puerto Rico. This advertisement became so popular that people also called Padín "the store of 300 light bulbs".

In 1912, the firm became González Padín y Co., Incorporated, and then Mr. Anselmo González Padin withdrew from the company, remaining, however, on the Island with his relatives. Don Jose González Padin then assumed the primary presidency of the firm. As the store had grown so much, it was necessary to make an extension to the premises, and the store extended to the Matienzo passage, to the three-story building next to the one it occupied. The first elevator for commercial use inside a store in San Juan was installed there. A soda fountain was also installed, the first in an establishment of its kind. The company would also later on open stores in Mayagüez and Ponce. In 1923, at a cost of $750,000, González Padín would move to a new building which was built in the Main Plaza of San Juan, and would open their flagship store which became the "First Commercial Skyscraper" in Puerto Rico. San Juan finally had a large department store, facing the Plaza de Armas. The company continued its pioneering work in many details that were later on commonly used by businesses on the island. It was the first store to offer the home delivery service, and to have "a price for everyone", as the fixed price system that later on governed commerce on the island.

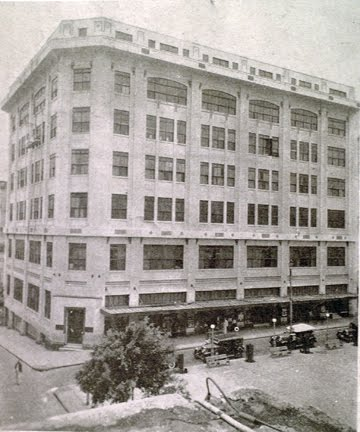
González Padín flagship store in San Juan in 1923

In 1949, a large display case was decorated for Christmas for the first time, inspired by the Adoration of the Magi. It caused a tremendous impact, as human-sized mannequins were used dressed in allegorical clothing. With this, a tradition began: every year, during the Christmas season, thousands of people, especially children, would wait for the Christmas decorations by González Padín, in Old San Juan.

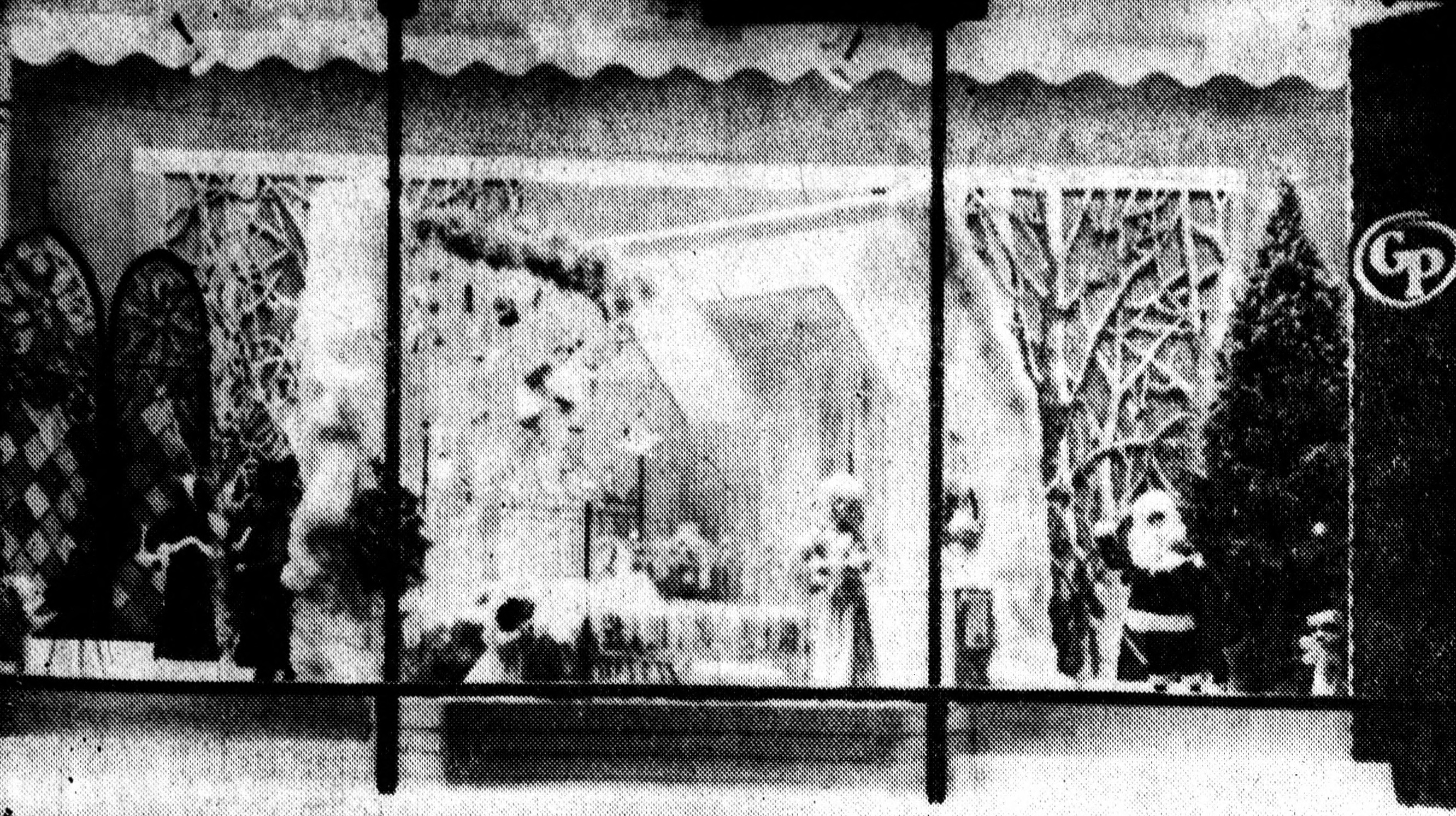
Christmas display at González Padín flagship store in San Juan in 1969

=== Expanding and Acquisitions: 1950s - early 1990s ===
On October 8, 1958, González Padín announced that it had plans for the following year to build a new store at the Parada 20 bus stop in Santurce, where once again they would be the first to offer the public, according to company directors, escalators like in some stores in New York. They also said that the new store would have ample parking space in its surroundings, and a canopy through which people could enter the store without getting wet or enduring the sun. In addition, they promised a modern cafeteria.

On November 18, 1960, a 69,000 square foot store at a cost of $1,500,000 million dollars, would open at the parada 20 on Ponce de León avenue in Santurce. The new store consisted of 20 departments where customers could get from a screw to valuable objects, everything a person could want. There were about 150 employees. Facilities included a parking area for 100 cars, a background music system on all three floors, a soda fountain, and rest rooms. On October 28, 1967, it was announced that González Padín had signed a multi-million dollar lease for a 2-story, 76,500 square foot building in Plaza Las Américas shopping mall.

On September 12, 1968, the biggest store at the time in the chain would open at the Plaza las Américas shopping mall in San Juan, with 2-levels of 78,000 square feet. It would be the first store in the chain at a shopping mall. On November 9, 1976, it was reported that González Padín was to return to Ponce. That week the contract was signed between the well-known department store González Padín, Inc., and the gigantic Plaza del Caribe Shopping Center, which was scheduled to begin construction in Ponce by January 1977. This was jointly announced by the owners of Plaza del Caribe, González Padín and the Kislak Realty Corporation, the firm in charge of commercial contracts in the regional shopping center at the time.

On October 4, 1972, a new store would open at the Mayagüez Mall in Mayagüez.

On November 26, 1976, a new store would open at the Plaza del Carmen Mall in Caguas. It was mentioned as one of the most modern stores in the chain at the time.

On October 9, 1978, at a cost of $8 million, the 7th store at the time in the chain would open at the Plaza Carolina shopping mall in Carolina. The architect of the project, Alfredo M. González, pointed out that although Plaza Carolina was in charge of the construction of the building, it was built and designed following the specifications of his firm, who was assigned by González Padin & Co., to take charge of the project. The structure of the new building, was a stand out for its solid construction with reinforced concrete walls and its modern and extensive facilities. Among the singularities of the new store you could point out the reflective glass panels on the facade of the second floor of the store, that would allow the customer to have a panoramic view from inside, giving the store a sense of spaciousness and a different facade; "escalators" spacious interiors; extensive rest areas for employees and a green area that would give a tropical atmosphere and great color to the new store. The store was on the center of the Plaza Carolina shopping mall and opened to it on two levels, allowing the public access to both, the first floor, as for the second. The store facilities covered an area of 88,000 square feet, of which 60,000 square feet would be destined for sales, 20,000 to a warehouse, and 8,000 for the other office facilities, beauty salon and rest areas for the public and employees. On November 3, 1981, González Padin, always concerned with providing a complete and quality service to its clientele, acquired the prestigious Los Muchachos hardware store chain, dedicating 5,000 square feet to it on the first floor of its store in the Plaza Carolina shopping mall. This was the most complete hardware store that existed at the Plaza Carolina shopping mall, offering its prestigious products to the public, such as: Sherwin Williams paints, Kohler bathroom pieces, and the Schlage locks.

On November 27, 1981, a new store would open at the Arecibo Mall in Arecibo. With this store González Padín had used a smaller store concept than the one it had in other shopping centers such as Plaza Las Américas and Plaza Carolina.

On December 28, 1983, a new store would be announced to be at the Santa Rosa Mall in Bayamón. The building would occupy 20,000 square feet with some additional 4,000 square feet of office space. It would take up a space once occupied by Belk-Lindsey at the shopping mall.

On September 6, 1984, it was reported that González Padín's decision to move its advertising account of nearly $2 million to a completely new agency was made based on the complexity of the agency and not with the intention of establishing his own agency. Ricardo González, then president of the chain of stores, which included Los Muchachos hardware stores, said the day earlier. On August 11 of that year, Enrique Marti-Coll, president of Marti, Flores, Prieto, Comunicaciones, Inc., announced that González Padín had decided to end relations with the agency effective October 15 of that year, after 12 years, "to establish his own agency and do publicity of González Padín and Los Muchachos". González Padín was leaving with "another agency that is being formed and that comes from New York," said Ricardo González at the time rejecting Martí's allegations. He did not want to identify it but pointed out that he was doing work for the company. He admitted that González Padín would have a stake in the new agency and that for now the stores would be his main clients, but he insisted that it would be open to accepting new clients. He also rejected information indicating that the change was made for economic reasons.

On November 2, 1984, it was reported that a new agency was officially operating under the name of Carabiner, Inc., the new agency that had replaced Martí, Flores, Prieto in managing González Padín's advertising account, would offer complete services but with greater emphasis on the "retail" phase. The announcement was made in a press release issued by the then president of the new agency, Richard Serrano, who insisted that the agency is independent and was not owned by González Padín. "Carabiner will be in charge of the vast campaigns of González Padín, as well as other accounts and is currently located in the González Padín building," Serrano said in the press release. "Although our agency has been established with the cooperation of González Padín, Carabiner is a totally separate entity from its own guidelines and personality, not an in-house agency (own agency)," he added.

In 1988, General Gases & Supplies Corp., suppliers of industrial gases and related products, purchased four Los Muchachos hardware stores from González Padín, in a commercial transaction of more than $2,000,000.

On November 24, 1989, Axxents was inaugurated in the Plaza Las Américas shopping mall, a new store of the González Padín & Co., which specialized in the sale of fragrances, beauty supplies and accessories - for both women and men - along with a skin care treatment center. A large group of personalities from the community gathered for the ribbon cutting by Eva Marie González, daughter of Pepe González and who was accompanied by her father, her uncle and Pepe's twin brother, Paco González and Ricardo F. González., president of González Padín. The blessing of the new premises was in charge of Father Jaime Vázquez, from the Cathedral of San Juan and personal friend of Ricardo F. González. Products of companies such as Elizabeth Arden, Estée Lauder, Clinique, Lancôme, and Erno Laszlo were sold.

On December 12, 1989, it was reported that Ernő László would arrive at the González Padín location in Plaza las Américas. At the time the brand had a limited number of 400 institutions in the most prestigious stores in the world.

In December 1991, González Padín would acquire the Velasco chain of high-end department stores on the island, which had been a competitor to González Padín for decades.

On November 9, 1992, a new store opened at the Plaza del Caribe shopping mall in Ponce. Which had been in development since 1976.

=== Dissolution ===
On July 14, 1995, it was announced that Dillard Department Stores had agreed to acquire the González Padín & Co. department store chain for an undisclosed price. The acquisition of González Padín, which had 1994 sales of $65 million, represented Dillard's entry into Puerto Rico. The closing of the acquisition was contingent on government approvals and satisfaction of other conditions, Dillard’s had said in a statement. A Dillard’s spokesman said that there were no plans to change the name of the stores to Dillard’s, although Dillard’s usually quickly renamed acquisitions and converted them to its own merchandising formulas and systems. In addition to acquiring the seven stores in the chain at the time, Dillard's had also agreed to build a new 250,000 square foot store in the Plaza las Américas shopping mall.

On September 16, 1995, Dillard Department Stores, which had announced in July it would buy the Gonzalez Padin department stores in Puerto Rico, said the deal was off. Dillard's said the parties couldn't reach a final agreement. The Dillard-González Padín deal had implications for South Florida, because Dillard's had expressed interest in entering Dade County, where Federated Department Stores dominated malls with its Burdines, Bloomingdale's, and Macy's stores. In mall politics, powerful anchor stores, could essentially block the entry of a competitor. Dillard's entry in Puerto Rico would have given the Arkansas retailer more leverage to enter Federated-dominated malls by becoming a major anchor at the coveted Plaza las Américas mall in Puerto Rico, where Burdines had also expressed an interest.

On October 31, 1995, it was finally reported that the over hundred-year-old Puerto Rican department store chain González Padín had announced, the total cessation of its operations, due to economic problems. The chain of stores had recently celebrated the 112th anniversary of its foundation. The president at the time of González Padín, Ricardo F. González, informed on the 30th, about the liquidation of the merchandise and the closure of all its establishments. González indicated that the company could not overcome the serious economic problems that it had faced for several years, due to the competition of other stores on the island. "As you know, we have explored every possible alternative and undertaken every remedy to avoid this outcome," González said. "In the middle of this year we thought we would save the situation by selling to the Dillard's chain, but these efforts failed for reasons beyond our control," González said. The closure which began on the 30th started with the closure of its main store at the time, in the Plaza las Américas shopping mall, causing the layoff of the numerous employees who worked there. In total, it was estimated that some 1,000 people that worked in González Padín would be unemployed by the end of December of that year. Under its umbrella it had other stores such as Velasco another high-end department store chain of Puerto Rico, Zona Libre, Axxents, Home Store, and Los Muchachos hardware store, which all closed with the chain by December of that year.

== Gallery ==
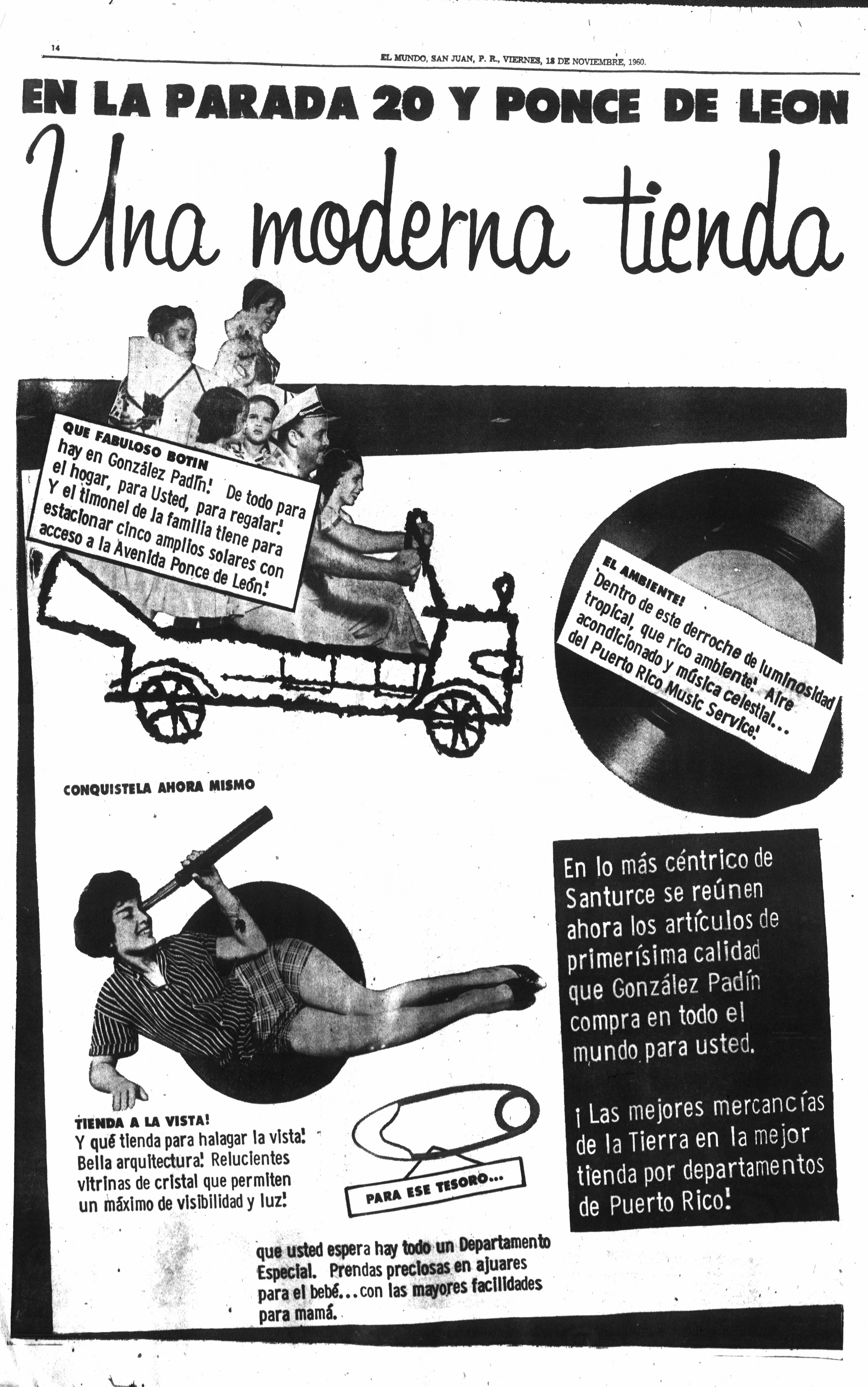
González Padín inauguration in Santurce in 1960

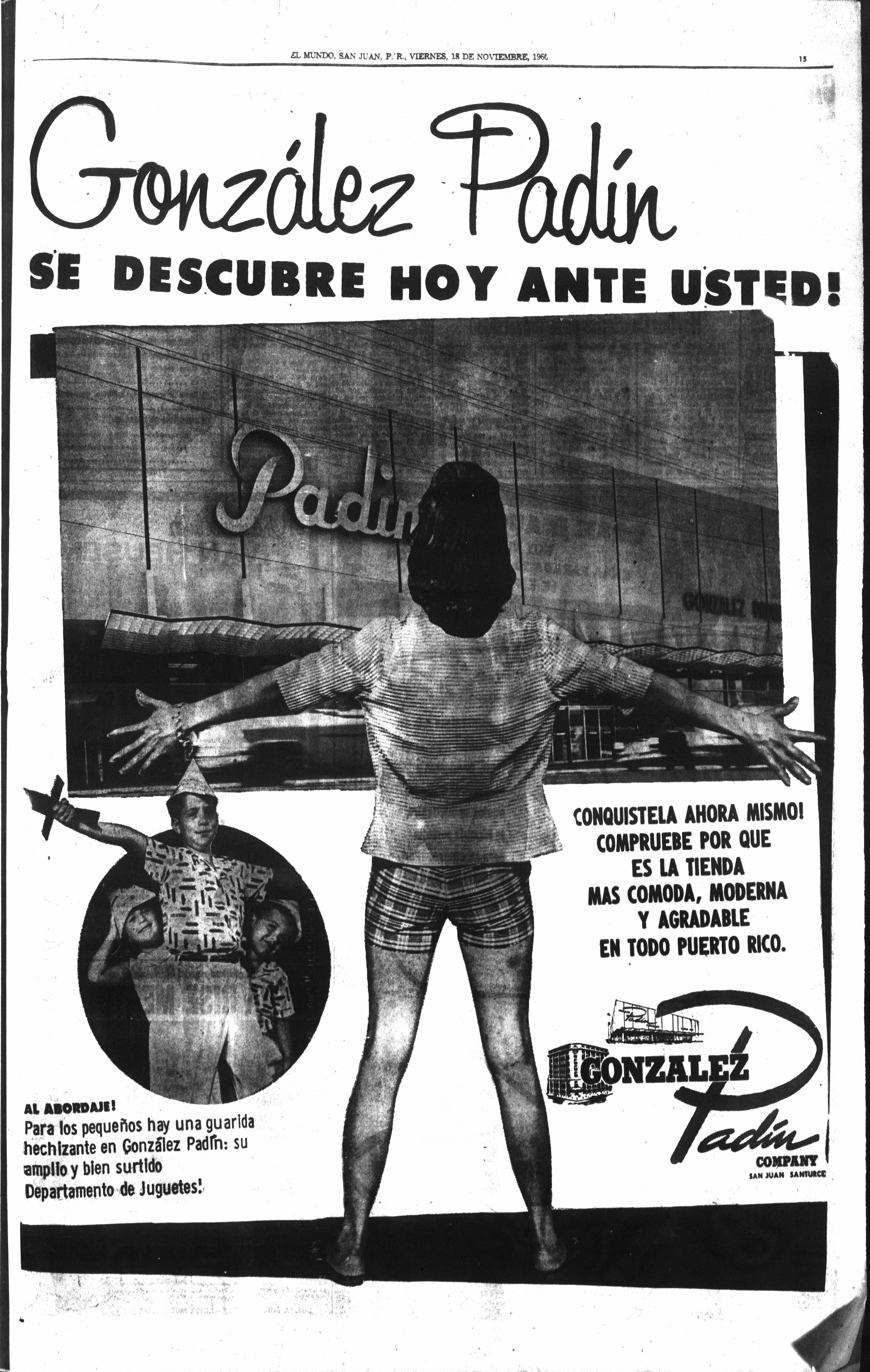
González Padín inauguration in Santurce in 1960

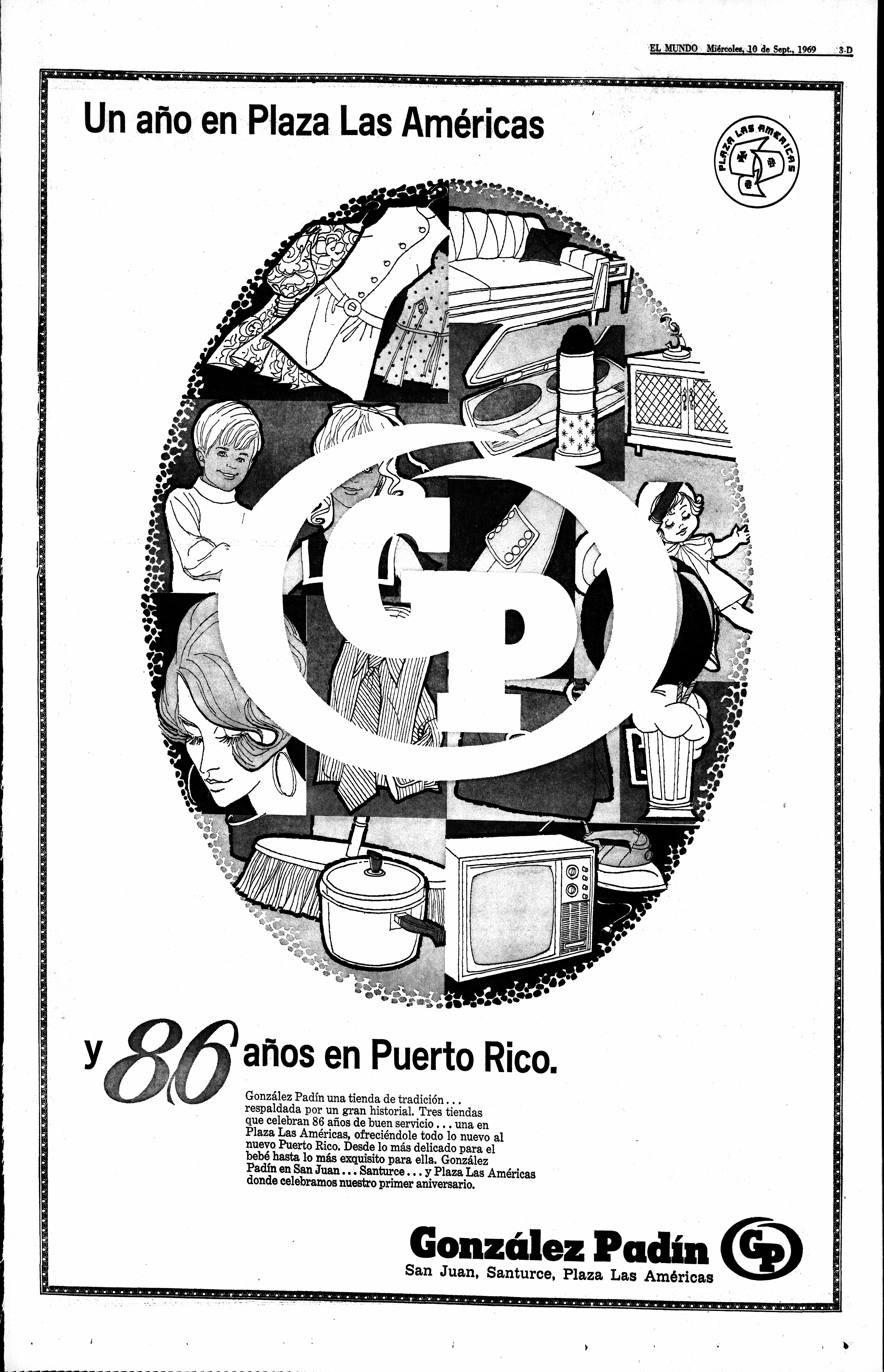
González Padín celebrating 86th anniversary and 1st anniversary of Plaza las Américas store in 1969

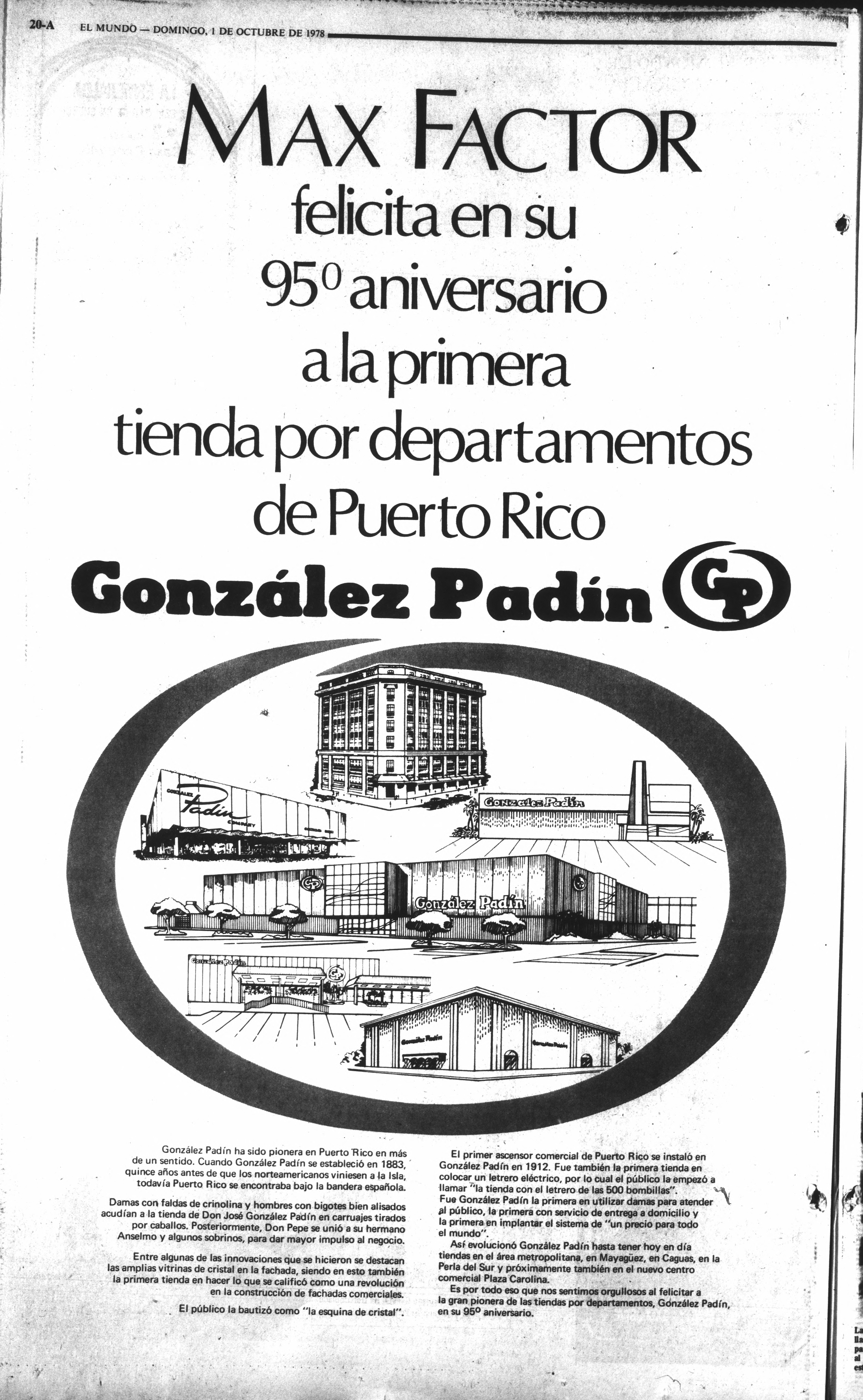
González Padín celebrating 95th anniversary in 1978

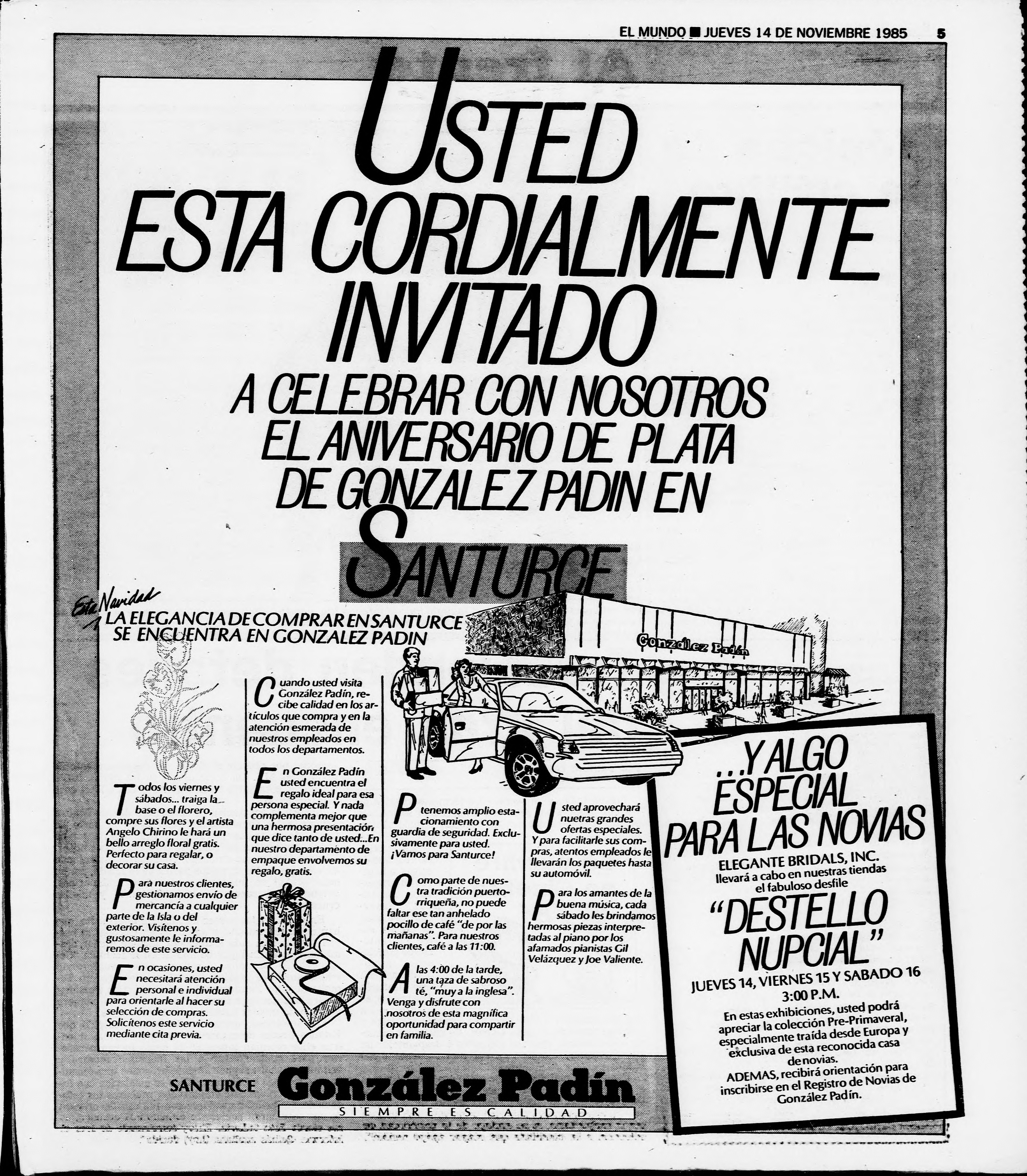
González Padín celebrating anniversary of Santurce store in 1985
