= Es de Velasco =

Defunct chain of high-end department stores in Puerto Rico

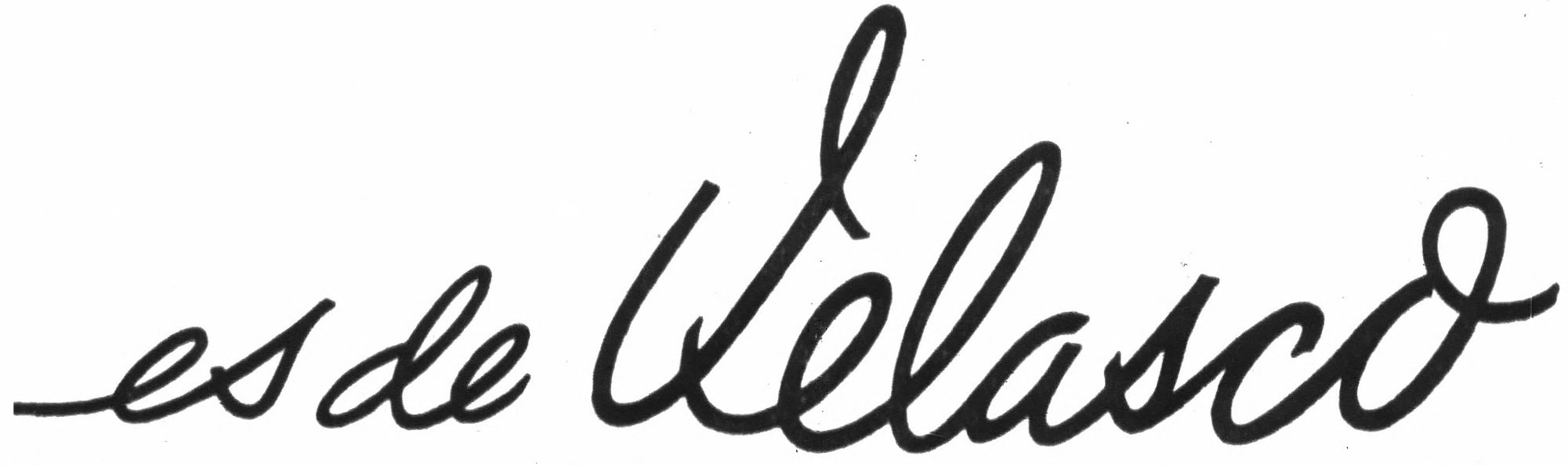
- Logo used from 1965 to 1995
- Company type: Department store
- Industry: Retail
- Founded: 1939; 87 years ago
- Founder: Domingo Velasco Alonso
- Defunct: 1995; 31 years ago
- Fate: Acquired by González Padín
- Headquarters: Arecibo, Puerto Rico
- Number of locations: 10 (at peak)
- Owner: González Padín

Es de Velasco, or mostly just known as "Velasco", was a chain of high-end department stores operating in Puerto Rico. The chain was later bought out by its main competitor González Padín in 1991 and closed in 1995.

== History ==
=== Origins ===
The US for thousands of immigrants was something more than a continent: the New World was an almost dream place to conquer fame and fortune. For many, this ideal was no more than a pipe dream, but for Domingo Velasco Alonso, a young Spaniard of incredible dynamism, the American myth became an exciting reality. Domingo Velasco Alonso arrived at the beaches of Puerto Rico in 1905 and begun to work in the city of Ponce.

In 1908 he moved to the city of Arecibo and began working with a company of wholesalers and retailers named "La Puertorriqueña" owned by successors of Lezcano y Co. But Domingo Velasco did not venture across the Atlantic Ocean and abandon his homeland to support himself as a wage earner. For this reason, in 1917, he associated with Antonio Aguirre, a merchant from the area, and founded the "El Cacique" store in Arecibo. The efforts of these merchants were quickly rewarded because in less than a year the store became a successful commercial chain serving not only Arecibo with its three stores but also surrounding towns such as Utuado, Lares, Quebradillas, and others. What caused such dramatic growth was the inconceivable dynamism of its founders, and secondly to the revolutionary marketing methods established by Domingo Velasco. In an unusual action, Domingo Velasco divided his profits 50 percent with the management of the branches. In addition, contrary to what was customary for the competition, Velasco did not impose surcharges on the merchandise that was sold to its branches, which allowed them to sell at lower prices than the competition. The commercial success was of such magnitude that Velasco, barely 40 years old, retired from his business in 1931, remaining a limited partner and moved to Spain with his family. But the absence of Don Domingo seriously affected the business and he was forced to return to the New World in 1936.

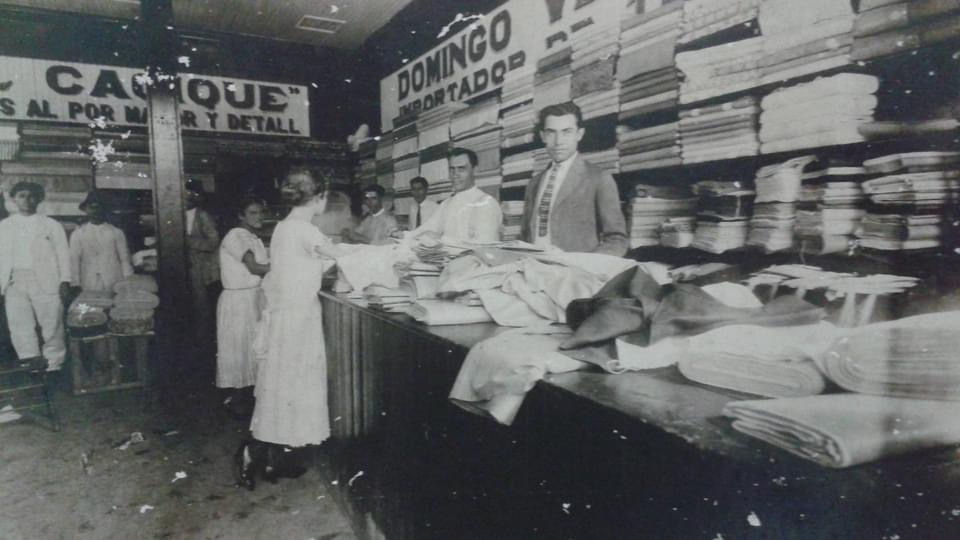
"El Cacique" store in Arecibo in 1919

In 1939 Domingo Velasco Alonso founded "Velasco Alonso" in Arecibo, the first Velasco store. At the time the largest department store on the island outside of San Juan.

=== Expanding: 1950s–1980s ===
On May 2, 1952, Velasco crossed new frontiers and inaugurated a store in the capital city of San Juan. The new store was installed on Calle Fortaleza in San Juan, and followed the style of the luxurious and modern New York City stores. Its design was in charge of the Puerto Rican architect Pedro Luis Amador. The store was decorated by Mr. Rafael Margarida. Its decoration was completely modern for the time. Hundreds of ladies attended the opening of the new business, being presented with samples of perfumes, cosmetics and other articles by different commercial houses that sent their representatives to show off the event. A large number of precious orchids were also distributed among the ladies who attended the event, as a gift from the owners of Velasco.

On April 27, 1957, a new store would open on McKinley street in Manatí.

On April 18, 1958, a new store would inaugurate at the San José Shopping Center in Río Piedras. Following the modern trend of the time period which was providing comfort to the buyer by establishing shops and supermarkets near where the new developments were located, Velasco inaugurated a modern, artistically decorated one-story store next to the supermarket Pueblo and the five and dime store of Woolworth at the shopping center. The new store would fill the housewife's need to buy good quality merchandise at nationally established prices by recognized factories and lines. It had 20 functionally and tastefully distributed departments that gave the store an impression of spaciousness while displaying the merchandise in full view of the shopper. The director of this store on the outskirts of Río Piedras would be Mr. Antolín Velasco. Also from Arecibo was the local decorator, Edna Rozas Mera, who chose a color scheme of different shades of golden yellow, highlighting touches of orange and white. On October 5, 1963, the reconstructed and expanded Velasco store in Arecibo was inaugurated, at its location on De Diego Avenue number 159, the first of the Velasco firm's chain of ten stores. The establishment, was full of customers and visitors, until around noon of that day when there was a short circuit in the electrical system that frightened much of the public and abandoned the store. However, part of the public remained there, especially on the second floor, where despite some having left, a fashion show that had begun continued. The Velasco store in Arecibo, had a very particular decoration, but very elegant. All drapery consisted of strings of plastic beads in color combinations. The floors of the first two floors were covered in olive green carpets, but the gift department, glassware, crockery and household linen, on the third floor, were not covered. Instead consisted of imitation ceramic tiles, in white and ice blue. The store had about 50 employees, but the entire company had about 200 employees in its ten stores located as follows: three in Arecibo, and one in each of the towns of Manatí, Bayamón, San Juan, Río Piedras, Utuado, Lares, and Aguadilla.

On September 12, 1968, with a loan of $600,000 from the Banco Gubernamental de Fomento, with a participation of $300,000 from the First National City Bank to finance the project, a new store would inaugurate at the Plaza Las Américas shopping mall in San Juan. The store would be done by architects Amaral y Morales. In the February to March, 1969, edition of URBE magazine the Plaza las Américas Velasco store would win an award for Interior Design.

In 1972, following changes of a modern strategy at the time, stores were incorporated under the name "es de Velasco, Inc." Directed by the children and grandchildren of Domingo Velasco Alonso, they maintained the same tradition of commercial dynamism of their founder.

On April 6, 1975, a bomb went off in the Velasco store at the Plaza Las Américas shopping mall causing an estimated damage of $1,500. No injuries were reported.

On September 28, 1979, a new store would inaugurate at the Plaza Carolina shopping mall in Carolina. For this store with 65,000 square feet and more than 4 million invested, each department It had were carefully designed to achieve an atmosphere of singular elegance. The first floor of the store designed by the New York City firm of architects Copeland, Novak and Israel and designed by the famous designer Isabel Montulier of Montgomery, would feature the most renowned cosmetics departments in the world. For the first time, a department specializing in casual clothing, exclusive to Velasco, would be opened. The department would have an extraordinary range of creations that would delight all women. At a level of fine jewelry made an entrance to Velasco the renowned Reinhold jewelry store, which in addition to offering its stupendous jewels of precious and brilliant metals, had designed a series of jewels based on Puerto Rican legends for this grand opening. The men's department would occupy a substantial part of the store with a wide selection of clothing where all Velasco customers could enjoy a special environment for their purchases. This department had been conceived in rich woods with pastel carpets. Getting to the second floor would be a new experience, since the escalator was located in an area with great natural light, thanks to glass skylights that served as a ceiling. On this second floor, the client would be able to appreciate the finery of the women's clothing departments, the children's and baby department, as well as the fine glassware department with a fabulous parquet floor made of white oak. In addition, the facilities included: administrative offices, credit department, security office, conference room, "lounge" for employees, a warehouse, and others. The telephone switchboard, air conditioning, security and computer systems at the store were among the most advanced in the industry at the time.

On September 25, 1980, Velasco would celebrate its 1st anniversary at the Plaza Carolina shopping mall in Carolina.

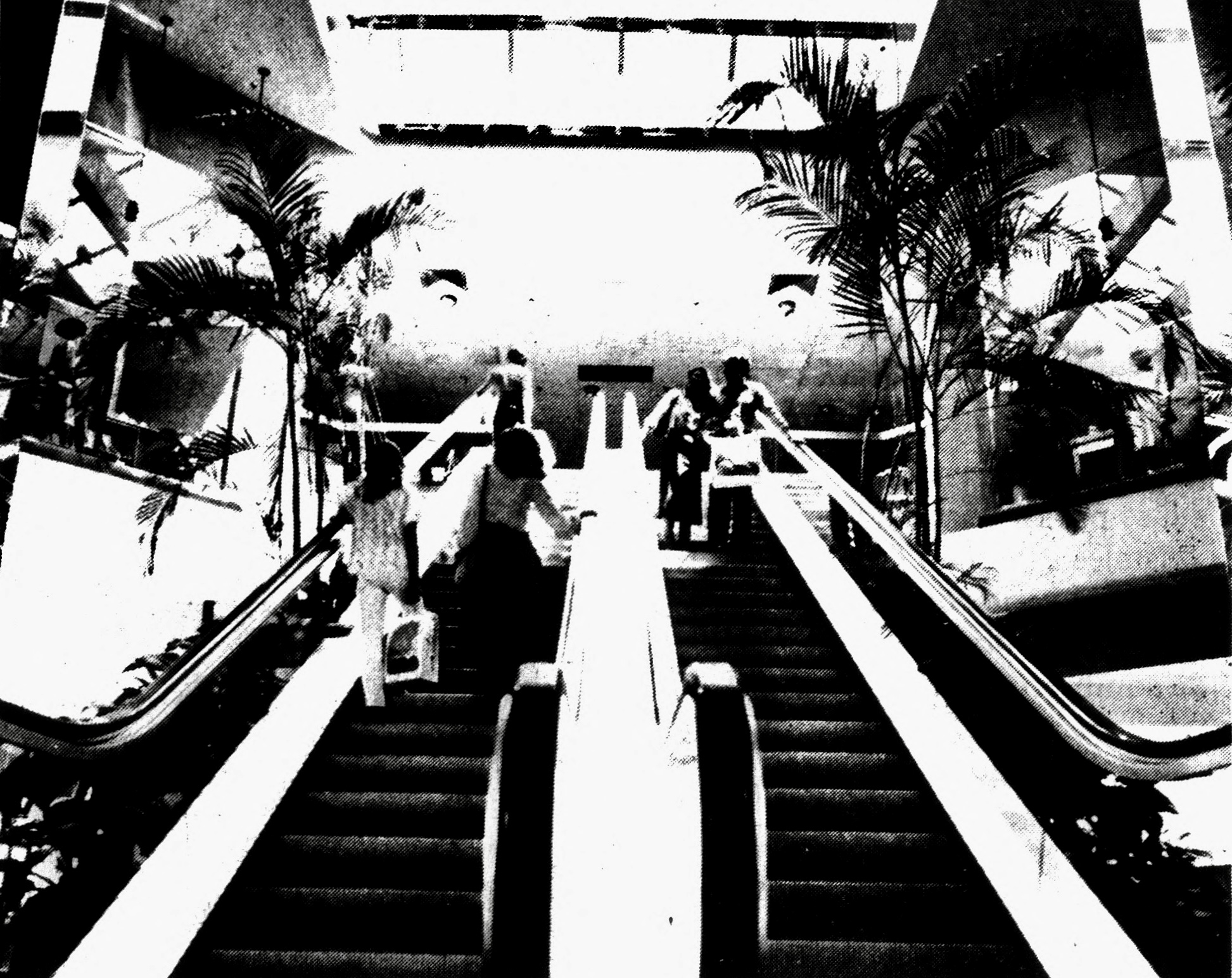
Velasco store at Plaza Carolina shopping mall atrium in Carolina in 1980

On August 25, 1981, the management of the Plaza Carolina shopping mall, located about 12 miles east of San Juan, announced the closure of its Velasco store, the at the time largest luxury goods establishment on the Island. The marketing director of Plaza Carolina, Mari Borrero Bou at the time said the 68,000 square foot store, which sold high-priced tableware, glassware and clothing by famous designers, would close, though an exact date was not announced at the time. The store was located in an area where families of moderate means primarily resided, and some speculated that its high prices were not compatible with their economic situation. Venezuelan tourists, probably the highest spending visitors to Puerto Rico at the time, were frequent customers at the store.

On August 27, 1981, the store at the Plaza Carolina shopping mall would begin liquidation and would close by the 29th of that month.

On February 19, 1986, a sea of cars parked in front of the Velasco store in Plaza Las Américas, on that Wednesday night, all which arrived from the Express of the same name. Not even a special sale could’ve gathered so many people in the middle of the week. The presence of Paloma Picasso in Puerto Rico had by force to attract around 400 people eager to see the figure of this European celebrity like a magnet at the Velasco store. Needless to say, the Paloma Picasso perfume flooded the atmosphere of the store. Throughout the night the fragrance was heavily promoted. Velasco's decoration, revolved around the theme of the night; everywhere the emblem of the perfume was seen, and the shelves were decorated in tune with the colors: black bathing suits, red and black vases, red trays, and dresses of the same colors.

On March 14, 1987, starting on that day, Velasco from Old San Juan would officially start the move to the Plaza Las Américas store. The union of both stores was part of a total renovation where Velasco would be able to offer the very best of the best.

On October 3, 1989, it was reported that Velasco was to introduce the exclusive line of men's suits Gieves & Hawkes in their stores, who were the tailors by Royal Decree of the Prince of Wales. Velasco would bring the collection of suits exclusively and in very limited quantities. In addition to the "ready-to-wear" line, and just for its introduction, one of its tailors would visit the store to also offer the tailor-made service for the suits. The Gieves & Hawkes line would be officially presented on October 4.

On August 16, 1990, it was reported that at the Plaza Las Américas shopping mall there was a proposed project that consisted of the construction of two additional floors above the Velasco store at the shopping mall with an area 72,000 square feet. The expansion of the Velasco building and the remodeling of the third level of the shopping center were being designed by the designers Méndez, Brunner & Asociados.

=== Acquisition, and dissolution ===
In December 1991, Velasco would be acquired by González Padín & Co., another chain on the island of high-end department stores which had been a competitor of the Velasco chain for decades.

On October 31, 1995, it was reported that González Padín had announced the complete liquidation of all its stores due to economic problems which included the Velasco chain, the whole chain would be closed by December of that year.

== B&B (Bonito y Barato) and Almacenes Tan Tan ==
On October 9, 1978, Almacenes Tan Tan would open a store at the Plaza Carolina Mall in Carolina.

On March 28, 1980, B&B (Bonito y Barato) would open a store at the Plaza 18 Shopping Center in Santurce.

On October 22, 1980, it was reported that Citibank announced that it had granted a $3.1 million loan to the firm Velasco Alonso, from Arecibo, for the expansion and modernization of the chain of retail stores B&B (Bonito y Barato), and Almacenes Tan Tan. Velasco Alonso. Inc., operated B&B Department Stores and Almacenes Tan Tan and was headquartered in Arecibo where it began operations as a partnership between Domingo Velasco and Generoso Alonso. During some years the company expanded and modernized and consisted the time of 13 department stores in the Northwestern part of the Island, including the metropolitan area of San Juan. On December 11, 1980, B&B (Bonito y Barato) would open a store at the El Canton Mall in Bayamón.

On August 5, 1981, it was reported that B&B (Bonito y Barato) dedicated to the sale of retail items, had appointed Ulises Cadilla & Asociados Inc. as its advertising agency. The president of B&B, Antonio Velasco reported that the firm estimated to invest approximately $400,000 in advertising and public relations that year. The B&B stores had branches in Santurce, Arecibo, Bayamón, Utuado, Lares, Mayagüez, San Sebastián and Aguadilla. The Tan Tan chain of stores, subsidiary of B&B, had stores in Isabela, Bayamón, Manatí, Arecibo and Carolina.
