= Arecibo Mall =

Former shopping mall in Arecibo, Puerto Rico

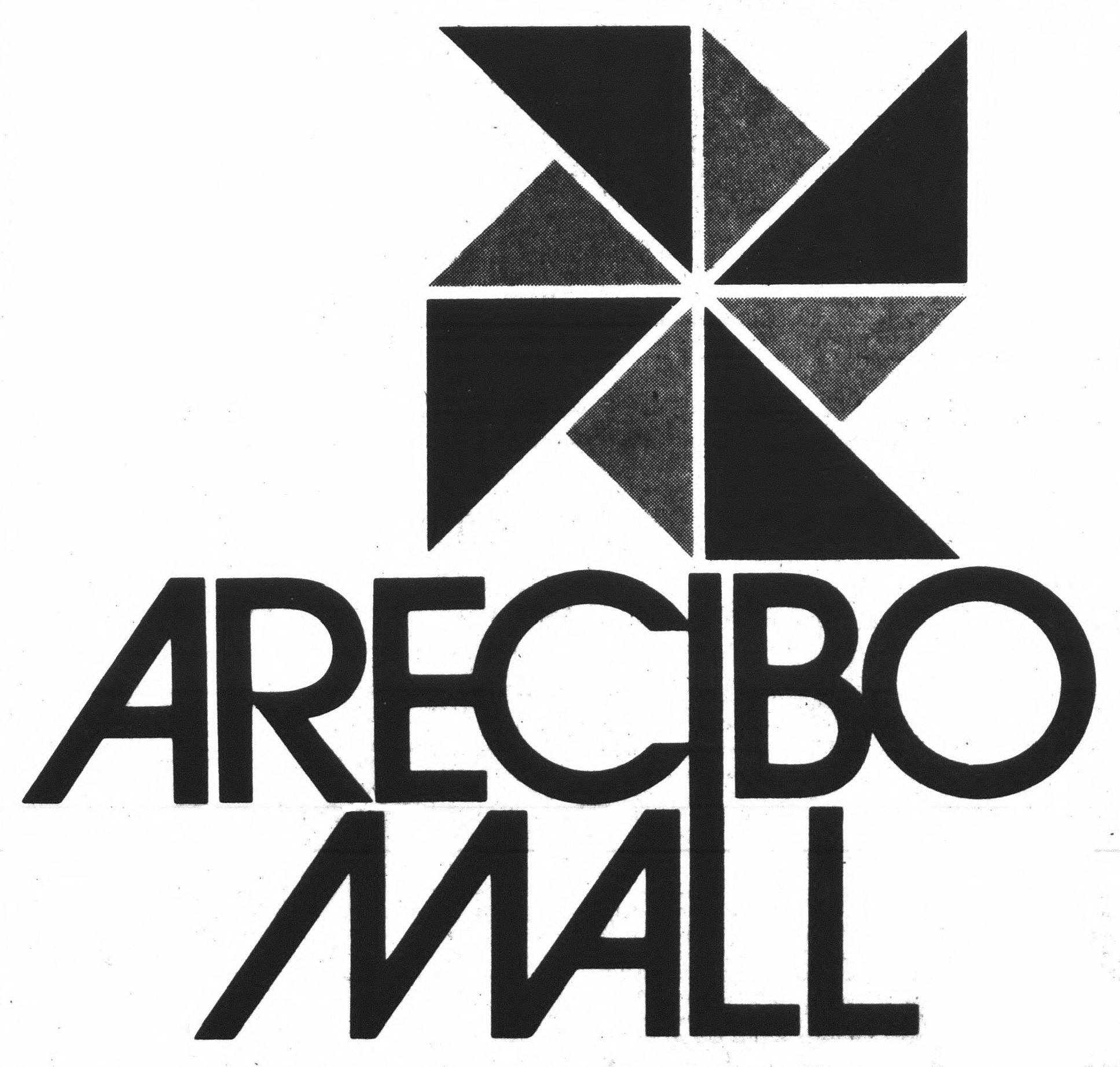
- Mall logo from 1981
- Location: Arecibo, Puerto Rico
- Coordinates: 18°28′8″N 66°43′46″W
- Address: Ave. Rotario Esq. 129, Urb. San Luis
- Opened: 27 November 1981
- Closed: Late 1990s
- Developer: Centro Arecibo, Inc.
- Num. of stores: 32 (at peak)
- Num. of anchor tenants: 2 (at peak)
- Floor area: 50,000 sq ft (4,600 m^{2})
- Floors: 3
- Parking: 300 (at peak)

Arecibo Mall was an enclosed shopping mall formerly located in Arecibo, Puerto Rico. At its peak it had 30+ establishments, and was anchored by a Gonzalez Padín department store and a Sears. It is now occupied by government offices.

== History ==
=== Opening and success: 1980s ===
On November 27, 1981, developed by Centro Arecibo, Inc. at an investment of approximately $5 million, being financed by both Banco de San Juan and First Federal Savings, the three-level, 50 thousand square foot Arecibo Mall would initially inaugurate, some establishments would open then and others would continue to open by December of that year, 32 establishments were expected to be open by that month. It would be primarily anchored by a González Padín which had opted to use a smaller store concept than the one it had in other centers at the time, and a Sears. On its first two levels it would go on to have such establishments as Los Muchachos, Farmacias González, Banco de San Juan, Bell Book & Candle, Christie, Babielle, Elegance In Shoes, La Grande Dame, Hers Boutique, Land Of Oz Arcade, Le Sabot, Maternity Exclusive, Music City, Novus, Orlane, Wrangler Wranch, and it would additionally also have food establishments in its food court “El Patio” such as Burger King, Los Cidrines, Soft & Creamy, Candy Land, Church's Fried Chicken, Orange Julius, Zang, and Sbarro. On its third level it would have a panoramic parking area that would be able to hold up to 300 cars. The project constituted the first foray into this type of business, by a group of local investors led by Basilio Dávila, Rafael Guillermety and José Luis Garcia.

On January 25, 1982, it was reported by then administrator of the center José Miguel Nolla, that for Christmas sales, the center had considerable success. By that date there were already 12 businesses in the center. By February 14 of that year there would already be 20, and on that date the official inauguration of the center would possibly take place.

In February 1982, the mall would have new establishments such as Madison Flower's, Sweets, and El Fogón del Patio.

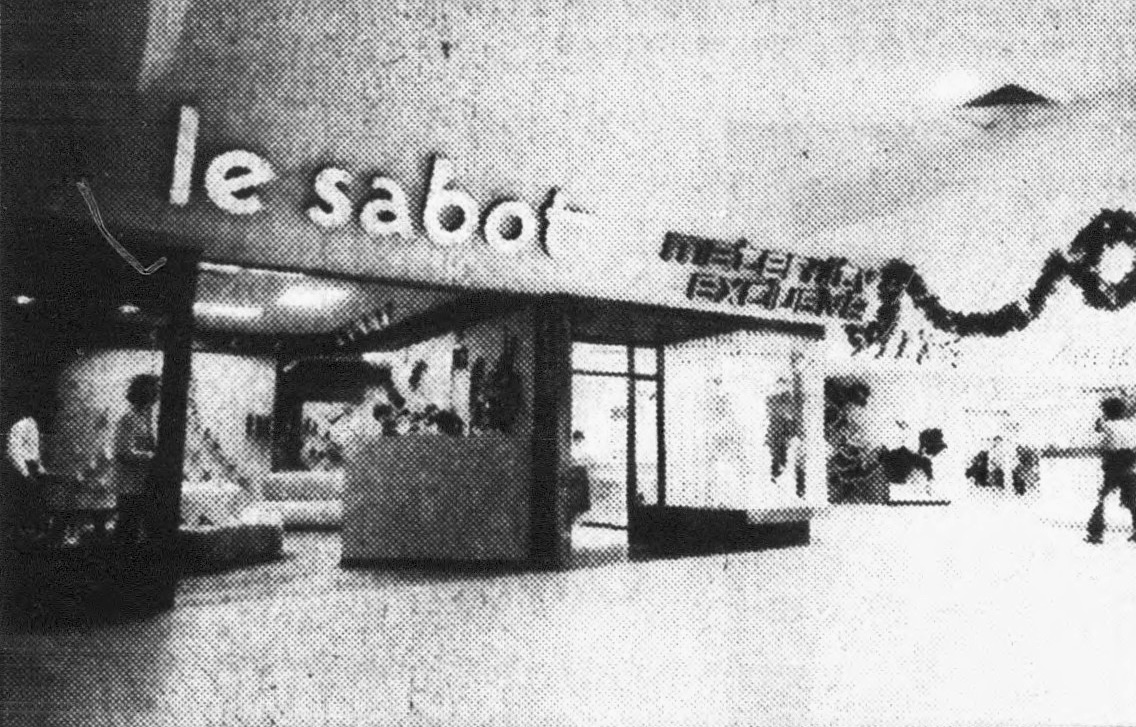
Stores at the mall in 1982

In December 1983, Empresas Fonalledas would acquire Centro Arecibo, Inc., and would dissolve the corporation on December 31, 1984. Making Empresas Fonalledas owners of the Arecibo Mall.

On November 23, 1985, González Padín would host a fashion show at the mall with local models of “Cutie Modeling”, presenting a collection from their Christmas catalog of that year.

In December 1989, the Arecibo Mall was mentioned as one of the major commercial attractions in the economic boost in the Villa of Capitán Correa. At the time some of the following stores and establishments were located on the upper level of the mall: González Padín anchoring the mall, where every year Puerto Rican Christmas was integrated into the traditional decoration of its stores. The Novus chain of stores which was another one that appeared on the second level of the shopping center, providing the latest in footwear for men and women from recognized brands. And on this second level, visitors would be able to find a large food court terrace of light-food restaurants, among which the traditional sweet shop Sweets was a stand out, where people would be able find not only a wide variety of sweets, but also exclusive gifts, and baskets for any occasion. Other stores on this second level included Sneakers; a sports clothing and footwear store, Rainbow Ranch; where you could find a variety of sportswear and clothing preferred by youth at the time, and Instant Shoe Repair; where you could do shoe repairs.

On December 9, 1989, during celebrations a Santa Claus would come to the mall on helicopter to visit children at the mall, these celebrations would also include music performances.

=== Closure and redevelopment: 1990s ===
In the late 1990s, after the mall started to decline with the closure of González Padín in October 1995 and other factors, the government of the Commonwealth of Puerto Rico acquired the physical facilities of what was known as the Arecibo Mall in the town of Arecibo from Empresas Fonalledas. The purpose of this acquisition was for it to be remodeled and re-developed into government offices.

=== 2022-present ===
In June 2022, it was reported that the former Arecibo Mall building had fallen into major disrepair. A visual visit carried out by the senator of the District of Arecibo, Elizabeth Rosa Vélez, evidenced terrible conditions of said building in which the regional government offices of the Department of the Family are located. The legislator, in a written communication, indicated that during the tour she came across leaks, exposed participant files, entire floors disabled and full of material to be seized. It was also indicated that to this is added the claim of the employees, who fear for their safety due to the conditions of the infrastructure of the place and who claim that the services remain in Arecibo. This after the announcement by agency staff to transfer services to Barceloneta and Quebradillas. But the senator for the District of Arecibo, Rubén Soto Rivera, informed that he strongly opposed the relocation of the regional office of the Department of the Family in said municipality since it would affect the service to more than 20 thousand beneficiaries.
