= Plaza Carolina =

Shopping mall located in Carolina, Puerto Rico

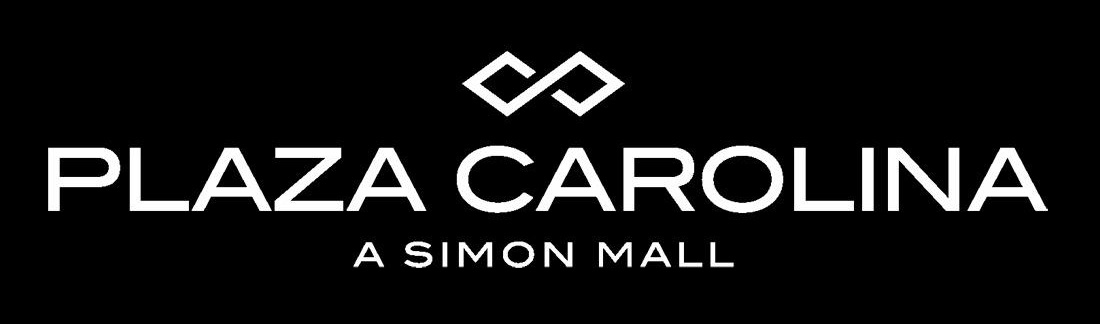
- Location: Carolina, Puerto Rico
- Coordinates: 18°23′33″N 65°58′28″W
- Address: Puerto Rico / Carolina / Trujillo Alto / Carolina / Avenida Regimiento 65 de Infantería (PR-3)
- Opened: 11 October 1978
- Developer: Plaza Carolina Associates
- Manager: Anthony Clementi
- Owner: Simon Property Group
- Architect: Eduardo Molinari
- Num. of stores: 161
- Num. of anchor tenants: 8 (7 open, 1 vacant)
- Floor area: 1,158,121 sq ft (107,593.0 m^{2})
- Floors: 2 plus 3rd floor offices
- Website: simon.com/mall/plaza-carolina

Plaza Carolina is an enclosed shopping mall located in Carolina, Puerto Rico. Anchored by JCPenney, TJ Maxx, Forever 21, Caribbean Cinemas, Burlington, Chili's Grill & Bar, and Supermercados Econo, it features 161 stores, making it the second largest mall in Puerto Rico and the Caribbean. The mall has a food court in its second floor and several offices in its third floor.

== History ==
=== Development and opening ===
Starting development as early as 1972 and being scheduled for completion by 1976, it was estimated to generate at least $75 million in retail sales annually during its first 3 years of operation and over $100 million thereafter. The mall was developed and was owned at the time by Plaza Carolina Associates, a coordinated project between General Growth Properties and IBEC. Eduardo Molinari was the architect for the project.

On September 27, 1978, JCPenney would officially inaugurate its store at the mall. The JCPenney store, whose physical extension covered 270,000 square feet (25,000 m^{2}), was the first store to open its doors in Plaza Carolina, and according to a spokesperson, it was the largest store in sales volume that the chain had ever opened in its entire history. It would create more than 400 new jobs in the area.

First having a soft opening with its anchors on the 9th, the mall finally opened on October 11, 1978. It opened with more than 100 stores, including 3 anchor stores, and parking for 5,000 cars. Its three main anchor stores at the time were, Sears, JCPenney, and a 88,000-square-foot (8,200 m^{2}) González Padín. It also opened with a 2-level, 37,000 ft^{2} (3,400 m^{2}) Woolworth store, which would additionally open with a "Harvest House" restaurant. Later, a 26,379 ft^{2} (2,450.7 m^{2}) Tiendas Capri was added.

=== Velasco arrival and the 1980s ===
On September 28, 1979, a 2-level, 65,000-square-foot (6,000 m^{2}) Velasco department store opened at the mall. It was supposed to be a high point for the chain, but it proved unsuccessful. The store was located in an area of families with modest means, and its high prices were not compatible with the economic situation of the time, which caused low sales. The store announced its closure on August 26, 1981. It was liquidated and closed by August 29, 1981. The first level of the store was turned into what is now known as "La Plazoleta", the food court in the mall, and the second level of the former store was turned into office space. One of the first spaces to open at La Plazoleta was a Tex Critter's Pizza Jamboree restaurant, the first for the chain outside the United States.

In October 1981, Plaza Carolina celebrated its third anniversary with a special appearance by Sophia Loren on October 24. Recent additions to the center and upcoming new stores were showcased by the assistant manager Norman Meléndez. He highlighted Marki-II, a new children's store in operation in the second level of the mall offering children's clothing, and various children's items and accessories. Preciosa, which specialized in cosmetics and perfumes, had also opened its second store, located on the lower level, just east of the sun sculpture in the center of the mall. Land of Oz, an electronic games room had just finished its third expansion. Another new store was El Criollito, located in the "La Plazoleta" food court, specializing in Creole foods for Puerto Rican tastes. Several other stores were also under construction including: Radio Shack, Fashion Warehouse, Value Slacks, and the Sandwich Marker, an addition to La Plazoleta. These eventually opened to the public. Part of the space formerly occupied by Velasco would be remodeled to accommodate several small commercial spaces. At the same time, the attached food court would be expanded to offer a restaurant area.

In August 1982, in sales per square foot, it was among the highest 10 percent of mall-type shopping centers in the entire United States. It had never gone through any economic problems since it had opened its doors; at this point, it had always increased sales, year-on-year.

In December 1989, it was announced that the mall would be undergoing a massive renovation to begin by January 1990. EQK Partners which had acquired the mall a year earlier planned these renovations to be completed by November 1990. Costs for these ambitious renovations were said to go over $7 million, with around 200 construction workers working on the massive project. This renovation included a full facelift for the mall, with new entrances, a new fountain, and a new color scheme.

=== Renovations in the 1990s ===
On November 15, 1990, Plaza Carolina was officially reinaugurated after the $7 million renovations. Among the changes, Richard Gelber, architect of the Shapiro, Petrauskas and Gelber company, in charge of remodeling project, indicated that new colors were used on facades to reflect the tropical environment of the island. New entrances were created with glazed ceramic tiles, pink stucco, diagonal candle-shaped walls, and neon lights that illuminate the interior and exterior of the center. They also installed skylights in the ceilings over the central areas with a lattice to let in natural light. A fountain surrounded by tropical plants was built in the central area that could be covered and become a stage for special events, since it had seats for the public placed in the form of an amphitheater. The decoration included the installation of glazed tiles topped with shiny metal and neon bands on the corridor columns. Reopening celebration activities for the public were announced by the marketing director, Josefina Cantellops. During this time the mall had a total of 1.1 million square feet of retail space with 170 stores, and it was primarily anchored by JCPenney, Sears, González Padín, Woolworth, Tiendas Capri, and a Pueblo Xtra.

In October 1995, González Padín ceased operations after a failed buyout by the retailer Dillard's which was supposed to save the department store; for unknown reasons the deal never happened, causing the permanent closure of González Padín. Over the passing years the former space of González Padín was subdivided into a mall entrance, and a Forever 21.

In October 1998, under the Lendlease an agreement was made with LaSalle Partners Incorporated to acquire from Lendlease the then current owners of the mall Compass Retail Management and Leasing operations for an estimated $180 million with provisions for an earnout payment of up to $77.5 million over five years, of which Plaza Carolina was included.

=== 1999 expansion and the 2000s ===
In 1999, the mall underwent a $25 million expansion and renovation which added over 60,000 square feet (5,600 m^{2}) in retail, a 12-screen CineVista Theatres, and a 510,000-square-foot (47,000 m^{2}) parking deck.

In August 2000, after its major expansion, Plaza Carolina reported that it continued to add stores to its tenant mix. Its most recent arrivals at the time included island-newcomers Rainbow, Styles, and d.e.m.o. as well as Frank Mora, which already had a local presence. Charlotte Russe and Old Navy were scheduled to open in September and November, respectively. The 3,857 ft^{2} (358.3 m^{2}) Rainbow store featured clothing, accessories, and footwear for women. Styles would also offer fashionable clothing and accessories for women and juniors in its 3,369 ft^{2} (313.0 m^{2}) store. Specializing in hip-hop style, d.e.m.o. would include the Sean John line from singer-producer Puff Daddy in its Plaza Carolina store, which covered 2,641 ft^{2} (245.4 m^{2}) and was the largest of the U.S.-based chain, according to Juliana Castillo, the mall's marketing manager. The Frank Mora store, with 2,265 ft^{2} (210.4 m^{2}) of retail space, would be the only one its stores that catered to both men and women. The Old Navy store would measure 17,313 ft^{2} (1,608.4 m^{2}) and would occupy the site once used by Woolworth on the first level. Charlotte Russe, also to be on the mall's first level, would measure about 9,000 ft^{2} (840 m^{2}).

In May 2004, Simon Property Group Inc. acquired its 100 percent interest from LaSalle Partners in Plaza Carolina for $309 million. At the time, the mall had maintained a 98-percent-average occupancy rate over the last five years, generating total annual sales of approximately $275 million and sales per square foot of over $450.

In January 2008, the CineVista Theatres closed due to bankruptcy. Later in May 2017, it was announced that a new Caribbean Cinemas would be opening in Spring 2018, bringing the mall back to having a cinema. Caribbean Cinemas previously had a presence at the mall from 1996 until 1998 when it was moved to Plaza Escorial.

=== 2010–present ===
In Spring 2011, Simon Property Group announced that the plaza, a major shopping destination for 33 years, would be completely renovated beginning the Spring of 2011. Said mall renovations would include new interior and exterior features and amenities such as additional seating, updated restrooms, redesigned mall entrances, landscaping, flooring, and lighting. These renovations were completed by 2012.

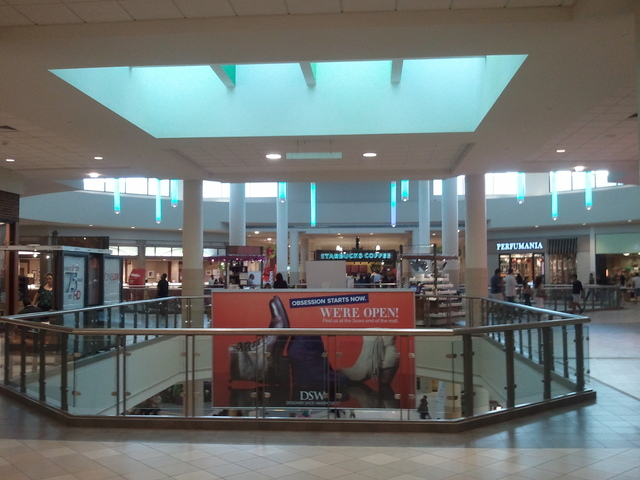
Plaza Carolina After Renovations

In 2014, Sports Authority and Men's Wearhouse were opened.

In 2016, Sports Authority closed after only two years in operation at the site due to bankruptcy.

On September 20, 2017, the mall was heavily damaged by Hurricane Maria when it struck Puerto Rico, leaving the mall in serious disarray. The mall was later repaired.

In January 2020, it was announced that Best Buy would be closing on February 28, 2020, as they decided to not renew their lease.

On December 23, 2020, it was announced that Sears would also be closing as part of a plan to close 23 stores nationwide. The store closed in February 2021.

In early 2020, DSW Designer Shoe Warehouse was closed at the mall for unknown reasons.

In October 2021, a Burlington opened in the former Best Buy.

On February 14, 2025, it was reported that Forever 21 had begun the permanent closure of all its stores in Puerto Rico starting the liquidation process for all of the 4 stores on the island of which included the Plaza Carolina store.

== See also ==
- Plaza Las Americas
- The Mall of San Juan
