= Santa Rosa Mall (Florida) =

- Location: Mary Esther, Florida, United States
- Coordinates: 30.41720°N 86.65707°W
- Address: 300 Mary Esther Boulevard
- Opened: February 25, 1976
- Closed: October 3, 2025
- Developer: Jim Wilson & Associates
- Owner: Radiant Properties
- Architect: Crawford Giattina and Michael
- Num. of stores: 104
- Num. of anchor tenants: 0
- Floor area: 733,996 square feet
- Floors: 1

Santa Rosa Mall was a shopping mall located in Mary Esther, Florida. By the time it closed in 2025, it had no anchors remaining. There is also a 10-screen Regal cinema outside the mall, which did not close and will remain open as the main site is redeveloped. Stirling Properties managed and owned the mall.

== History ==
Jim Wilson & Associates built the mall in 1976. A wing anchored by McRae's was added in 1984; the store became Belk in 2006. Gayfers, an original anchor of the mall, became Dillard's in 1998. A carousel was installed in 1996.

It was sold in 1987 to California Public Employees Retirement System, sold back to Jim Wilson in 1997, and re-sold in 2003.

The mall underwent structural damage after Hurricane Opal in late 1995.

In 2007, the mall underwent renovations which included new flooring and the opening of new restaurants. Space was also made for a Ross Dress for Less store, although it never opened. The area ultimately became a Planet Fitness in 2013.

Belk announced its closure in December 2013.

On October 15, 2018, it was announced that Sears would be closing as part of a plan to close 142 stores nationwide.

In August 2019, the demolition of the former Belk began.

On June 4, 2020, JCPenney announced that this location would close as part of a plan to close 154 stores nationwide. This left Dillard’s as the only anchor.

On February 22, 2023, it was announced that Dillard’s Clearance Center would be closing by March 31 as part of a plan to close 3 stores nationwide, leaving the mall with no anchor stores.

Demolition of the former Dillard's and food court was announced on March 12, 2025.

On July 28, 2025, Santa Rosa Mall announced it would be closing in September 2025. The area is planned for redevelopment with apartments, shops and restaurants.
