= Santa Rosa Mall (Puerto Rico) =

Shopping mall in Bayamón, Puerto Rico

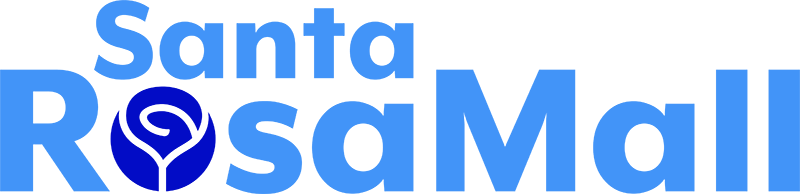
- Location: Bayamón, Puerto Rico
- Coordinates: 18.3943°N 66.1452°W
- Address: Puerto Rico Highway 2
- Opened: 11 February 1960
- Developer: Eastern Shopping Centers, Inc.
- Manager: CCM
- Owner: Commercial Centers Management
- Architect: Rene Martinez
- Num. of stores: 100+
- Num. of anchor tenants: 2
- Floor area: 503,610 square feet (46,787 m^{2})
- Floors: 2
- Website: www.santarosamallpr.com

Santa Rosa Mall is a shopping mall in Bayamón, Puerto Rico. It is on Puerto Rico Highway 2 and is near the Deportivo station of Tren Urbano. The mall is owned by Commercial Centers Management and has an area of 503,610 square feet (46,787 m^{2}). The mall is anchored by Burlington Coat Factory and IKEA. Burlington Coat Factory was previously Supermercados Grande, and a González Padín.

== History ==
=== Development and opening: 1950s-1960s ===
On July 27, 1958, plans for the then called Santa Rosa Plaza were announced. Developed by Eastern Shopping Centers, Inc. of Yonkers, N. Y., it was to be a shopping center with approximately 160,000 square feet of store space and parking for more than 1000 cars, construction was to start within a month developers at the time said. It was to rise on a 20-acre site that was part of a 300-acre, 1700-home housing de development in the city of Bayamon, eight miles southwest of the Puerto Rican capital. It was to be built by the Antilles Construction Corporation, and Rene Ramirez, then A. I. A., of San Juan, was appointed to be the architect for the shopping center.

In August 1959, leases were signed for the first two Kresge stores on the island of which included one in the Santa Rosa Plaza, the other being a store at the 65th Infantry Shopping Center. Each would be variety department store operations with more than 20,000 square feet and carrying full assortments of Kresge's expanded lines of higher priced merchandise, as well as the traditional variety lines. They were to be expected to open by early 1960.

On December 17, 1959, the Grand Union supermarket would inaugurate at the soon to be completed shopping center.

On February 11, 1960, after construction was finally completed on the then $6 million Santa Rosa Plaza. It inaugurated with 25 stores and more than 30,000 customers thronged the shopping center to shop at stores at the time such as the first and only ever Belk-Lindsey Department Store on the island, Kresge's, and Grand Union, the three of which anchored the shopping center at the time, and other retail units of the time. It opened with 200,000 square feet of rentable store space and parking for over 1,400 cars. It was estimated the shopping center would have annual sales of around 10 million dollars.

In 1963, the mall included stores such as Almacenes González, Bakers Shoes, Franklin's, Western Auto, and many others.

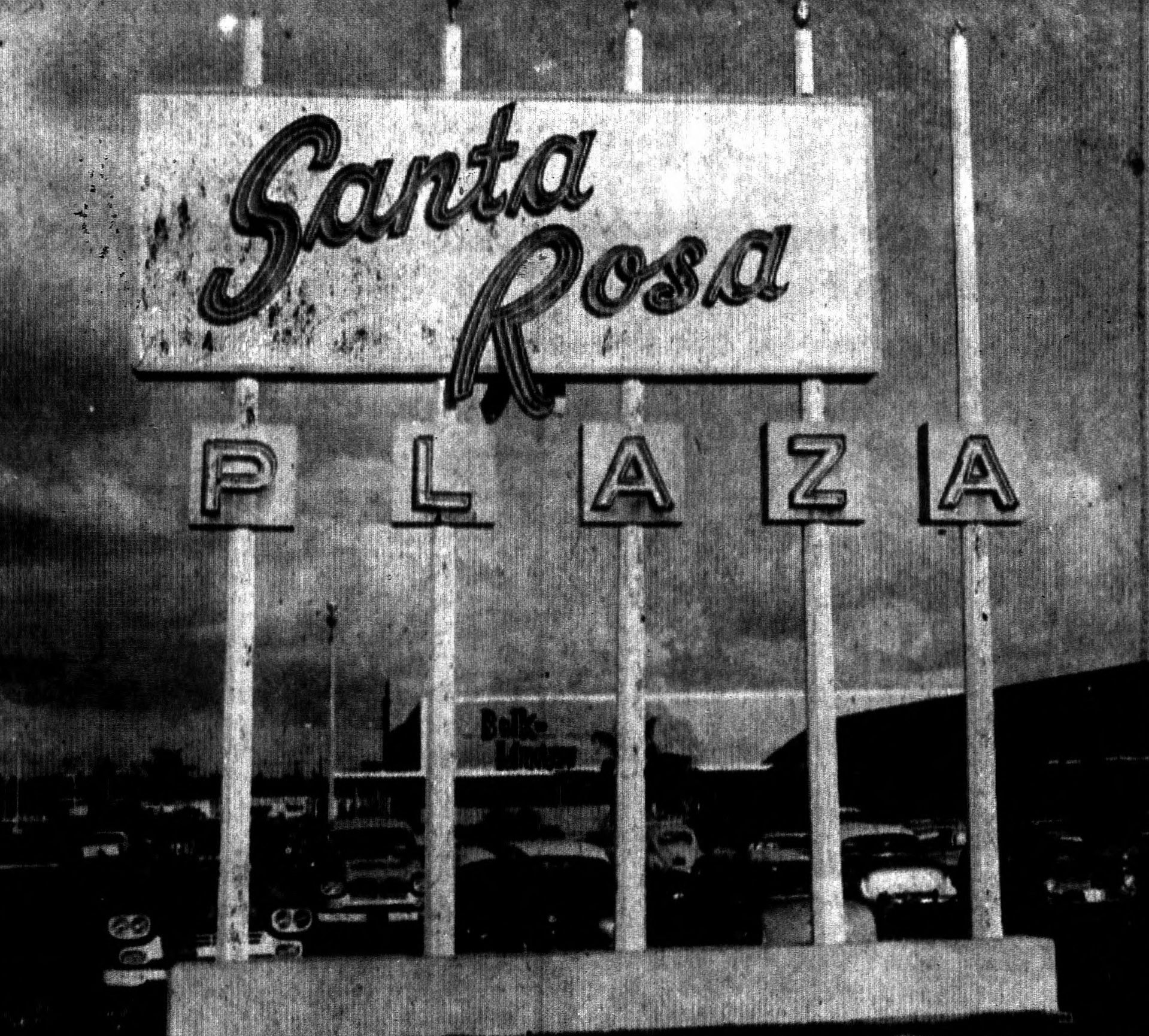
Santa Rosa Plaza in 1963.

On September 2, 1966, a new Belk-Lindsey store would be inaugurated after relocating into a new bigger building at the shopping center.

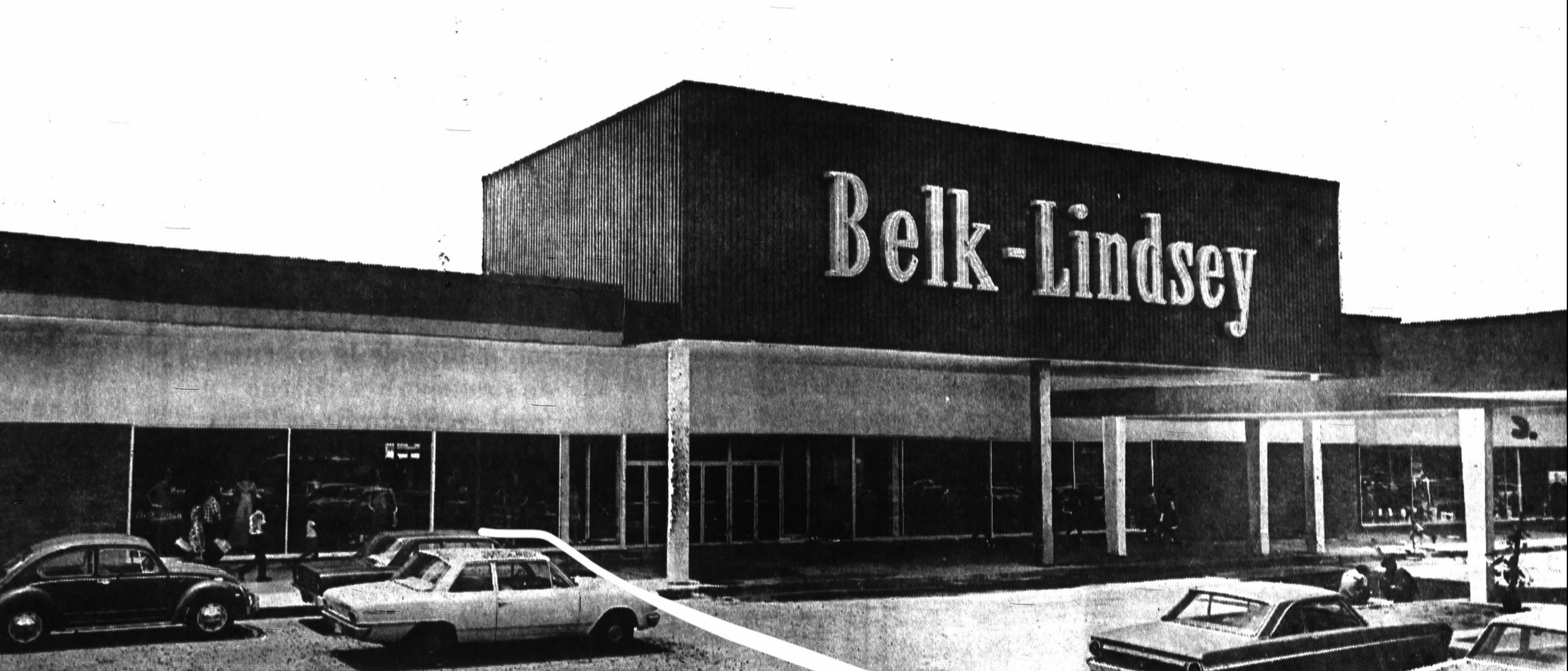
Newly inaugurated Belk-Lindsey store in 1966

On October 2, 1967, a series of fires broke out in several American-owned stores in the San Juan metropolitan area, causing damage estimated at $1 million. Police reported that at the Santa Rosa Plaza the Belk-Lindsey store was destroyed and the Barker's and Kresge's stores at the shopping center were damaged.

On May 10, 1968, the Belk-Lindsey store at the shopping center was re-constructed and re-inaugurated to much fanfare.

On October 16, 1968, Sears inaugurated a new store becoming an anchor for the shopping center. Additionally it also opened an Auto Center in the basement of the store which had a capacity of up to 27 automobiles.

=== Enclosure, expanding, and success: 1970s-1980s ===
On October 3, 1970, a Mobil Self-Service gas station opened at the shopping center, being named as the first of its kind on the island.

In July 1973, a Howard Johnson's Ice Cream Parlor opened at the shopping center.

In May 1983, it was announced by then owners Plaza Las Cumbres Inc. that at a cost of $2 million, the shopping center would be undergoing renovations, a massive expansion of an addition of 76,000 square feet of space, and that it would become an enclosed shopping mall. The construction would be carried out by the firm Redondo Construction, and the financing would be provided by the Banco de Ponce.

In October 1983, it was announced that the mall would be expected to open by late November or early December of that year. The newly enclosed shopping mall opened that year with 50 new establishments such as a Chuck E. Cheese restaurant, The Gap, Surf Line Borinquen, La Suela de Goma, Pearle Vision Center, Cine-Foto, Park Avenue Jewelry, Kress Kids, Arias, Radio Shack, Florsheim, and many other establishments of the time. Additionally in an area where the shopping center was located, an independent building was also built for a Popeyes Fried Chicken. These new renovations were designed by experts from GTE Sylvania, and by other consultants.

In December 1983, it was announced that a González Padín department store would be opening in the soon to be vacant Belk-Lindsey department store space which was to close by January 1984. Belk-Lindsey decided to close their location at the mall to focus their operations on the mainland. The building that González Padín then would occupy was of 20,000 square feet with some additional 4,000 square feet of office space.

On March 31, 1984, a Pearle Vision Center would inaugurate at the newly renovated and enclosed mall.

On February 1, 1986, a new food court named the “Food & Fun Plaza” opened on the second level of the mall with establishments such as a Baby-Bull, Chardonnay Cocktail Lounge-Bar, Golden Skillet Fried Chicken, Café au Lait, Subway Sandwiches & Salads, Pizza Piazza, and a Hot Diggity Dog. Later on it also had tenants such as a Taco Maker Express, Time Out, Sabor Criollo, Burger King, and a Cinnamon Company.

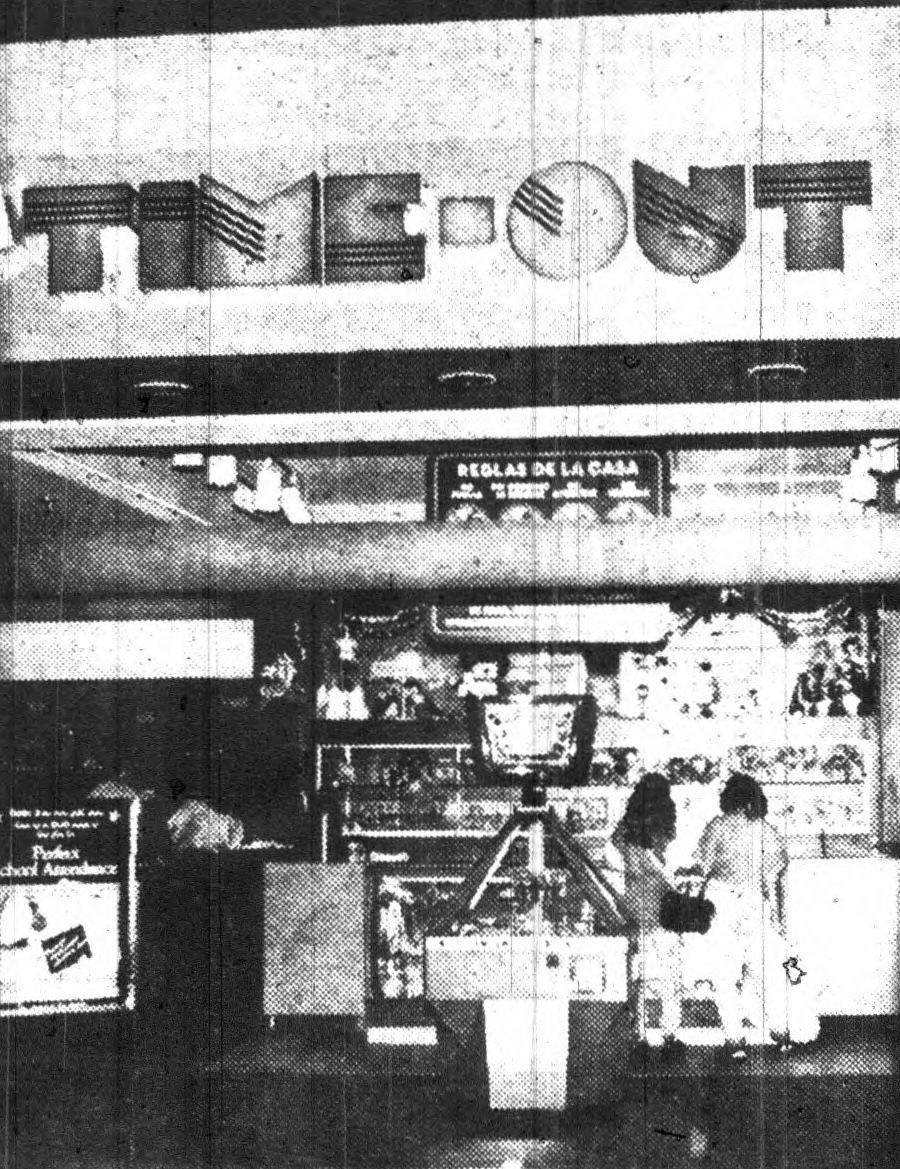
Time Out Arcade at the Food & Fun Plaza Food Court in 1989

In July 1987, a Ponderosa Stakehouse opened at the Sears store in the mall.

In May 1987, the mall counted with stores such as Roses Perfumes, Bathique, Martínez, La Favorita, Femenina, Detalles... y algo más, and many more.

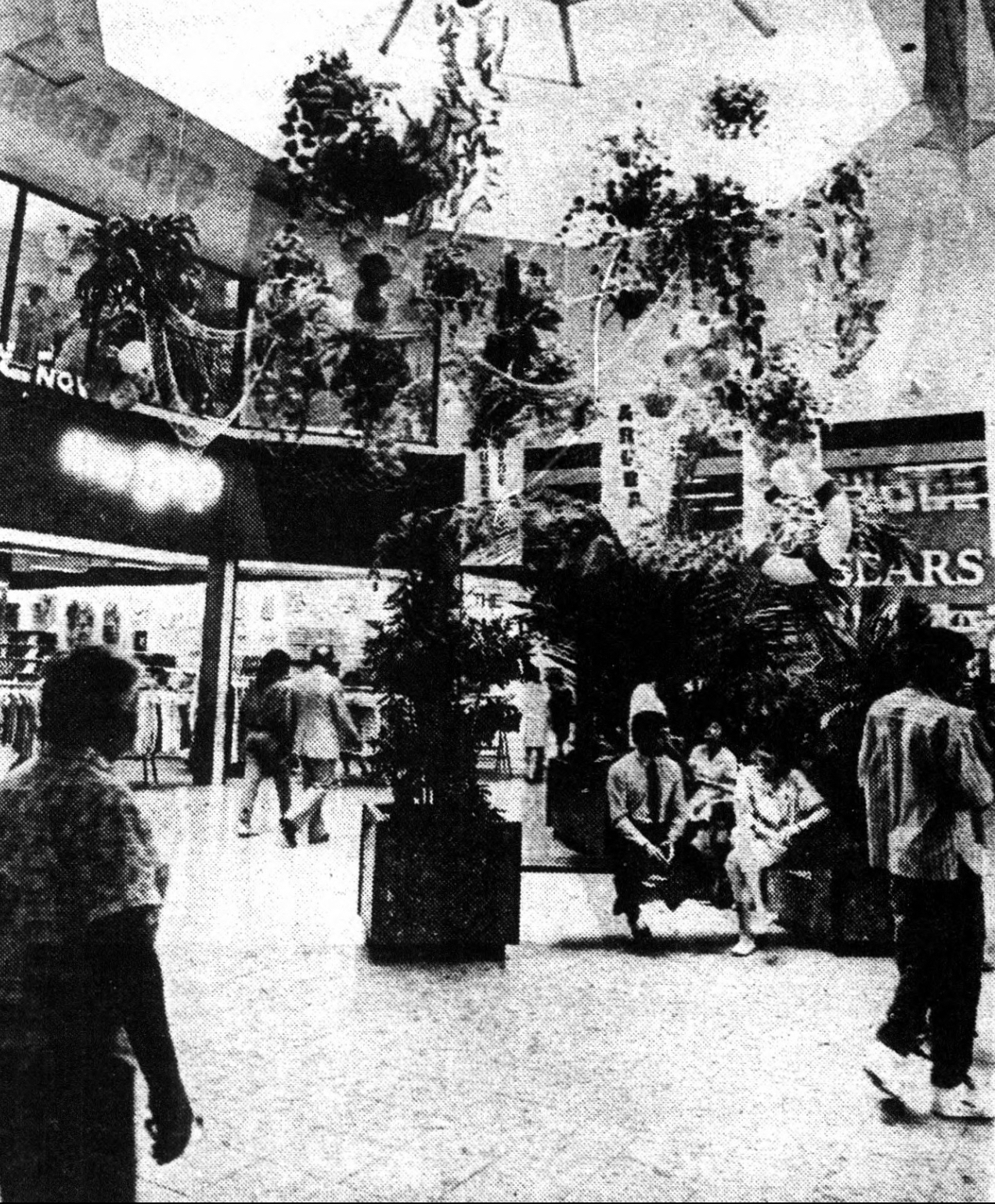
The Gap and Sears at the mall in 1987

=== Expanding and success: 1990s-2000s ===
In 1990, being owned by Retail Investments S.E. by this time the shopping mall had around 54 stores of which included stores such as Novus, Bakers Shoes, Marianne, Cristina's, Esprit, La Femme, Pretty Lady, Rave, Zale Jewelry, Casa de Telas, Budget Video, and a Moscoso Drugs.

In October 1994, the mall underwent an expansion.

In October 1995, the González Padín closed at the mall after the chain ceased operations and went into liquidation that month.

In the early 2000s, under the ownership of Commercial Centers Management the mall underwent renovations and expansions of which included redesigned interiors, a structured parking facility with capacity for more than 1,000 cars which was added for a total capacity of 3,000 parking spaces, an additional 48,000 square feet of retail space, and a 30,000 square foot expansion for a junior anchor then under construction. It was also proposed at this time a 50,000 square foot expansion for a movie theater complex. During this time the mall was anchored by a Sears, Sears Homelife, and a Grande Supermarket which had since then replaced the former González Padín space.

=== 2010s, and on ===
On July 14, 2011, Commercial Centers Management (CCM), which operated 14 commercial centers in Puerto Rico at the time, was completing construction on a Burlington Coat Factory store in the Santa Rosa Mall which was set to open by September of that year. Total investment was about $10 million, which included the anchor store and overall improvements to the mall's west entrance and surrounding parking area.

In September 2011, after the closure of the Grande Supermarket at the mall Burlington Coat Factory took over the then vacant 70,000 square feet of space and inaugurated their 5th store at the time on the island. They additionally also opened Burlington Shoes and Baby Depot stores at the mall.

On August 31, 2019, it was announced that Sears would be closing this location a part of a plan to close 85 stores nationwide. The store closed in December 2019. The store had been closed since Hurricane Maria in 2017.

On January 21, 2020, it was announced that negotiations were underway between the operators of the Santa Rosa Mall and the owners of the IKEA franchise to open the first full-service store in Puerto Rico at the 220,000 square foot former Sears building.

On September 29, 2021, the new full-service IKEA store was inaugurated after an investment that exceeded $50 million and the creation of 550 direct jobs.

== Anchor stores ==
- Burlington
- IKEA

== Former stores ==
- Sears
- Supermercados Grande
- González Padín
- Belk-Lindsey
- Western Auto
- Grand Union Supermarkets
- Dunkin' Donuts/Baskin-Robbins (outparcel) - now a Church's Chicken
- Chuck E. Cheese's Pizza Time Theatre
