= Plaza Las Américas (Puerto Rico) =

Shopping mall in Hato Rey, San Juan, Puerto Rico

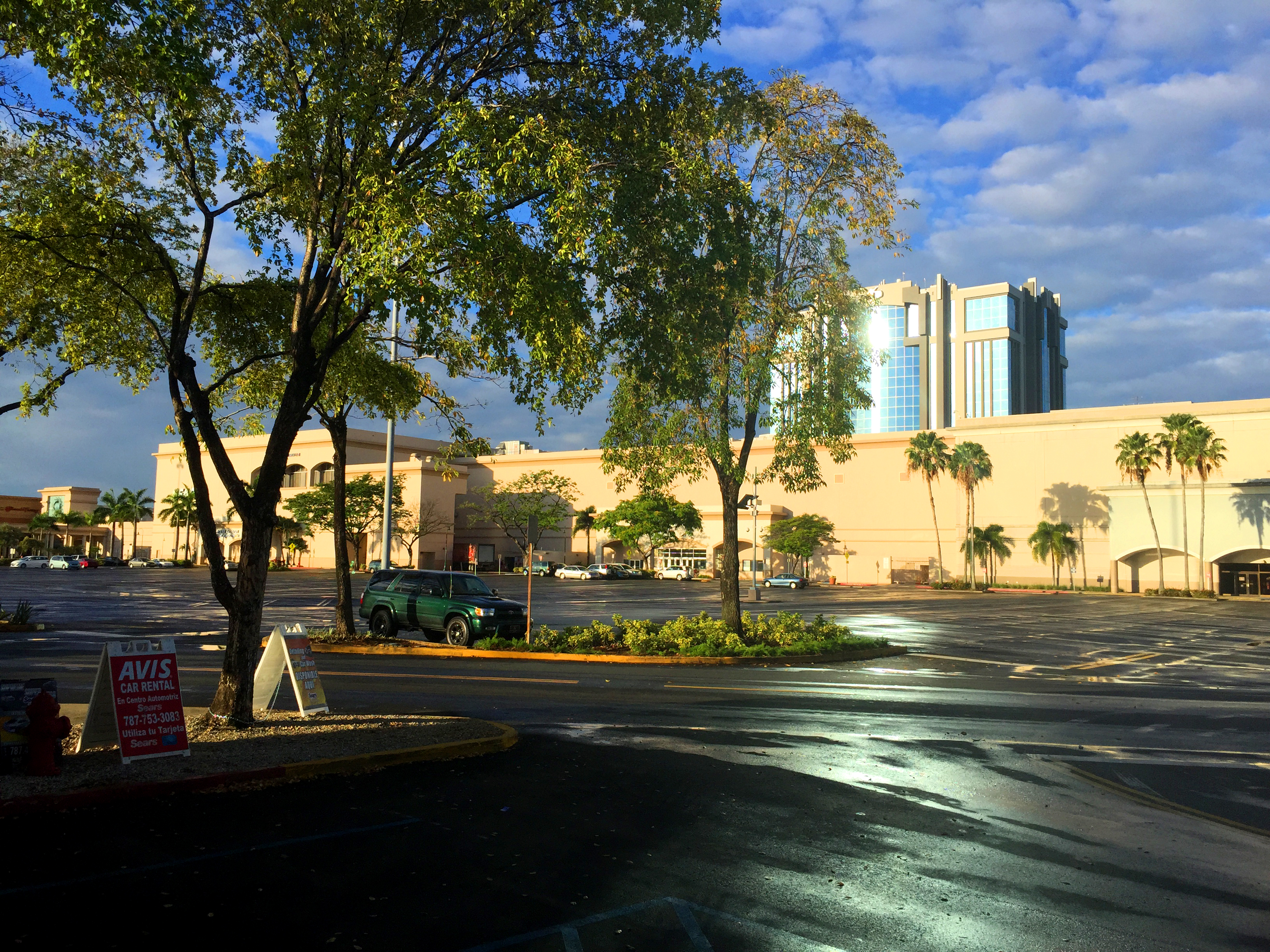
- Plaza Las Américas exterior in 2015
- Location: Hato Rey, San Juan, Puerto Rico
- Coordinates: 18°25′19″N 66°4′28″W
- Opened: 12 September 1968
- Developer: J. I. Kislak Inc., Empresas Fonalledas, Inc.
- Manager: Franklin Domenech
- Owner: Plaza Las Américas, Inc; Empresas Fonalledas, Inc.
- Architect: Lathrop Douglass, Sacmag of Puerto Rico, Inc.
- Num. of stores: 300+
- Num. of anchor tenants: 6 (1 vacant)
- Floor area: 1,900,000 sq ft (180,000 m^{2})
- Floors: 3 of shopping mall (4 in JCPenney, closed 4th floor in Macy's); 12 of office bldg. ("La Torre")
- Parking: 11,300+ (approx.)
- Website: plazalasamericas.com

Plaza Las Américas is a shopping mall in Hato Rey, San Juan, Puerto Rico, located at the intersection of Routes 18 and 22. "Plaza", as it is known to many Puerto Ricans, was the first indoor shopping mall built in Puerto Rico. It is the largest shopping mall in the Caribbean and the second largest in Latin America. Anchor stores are JCPenney, Macy's, Old Navy, Caribbean Cinemas and Marshalls. Previously, there was a Kmart store near the mall and a Sears Brand Central. The mall is home to the world's largest Romano's Macaroni Grill restaurant.

== History ==
=== Background ===
In 1918, siblings Jerónimo, Rosa, Gerardo, and Jaime Fonalledas acquired 527 acres (2.13 km^{2}) of land previously known as "Las Monjas". This land was property of Don Pablo Ubarri Capetillo, the Count of Santurce. By 1920, little by little cane harvesting was eliminated with the intention of using the land for the creation of a milk company, eventually known as "Vaquería Tres Monjitas".

=== 1950–1969: Development and opening ===
In 1950, the metropolitan area of San Juan was growing rapidly. The planning board began to build the project and ordered the development of the lands. It is then that the Fonalledas brothers came up with the idea of establishing a regional shopping center in the "Las Monjas" property. The planning board in cluded a space of 15 acres of land for a shopping center in its development plan.

On March 8, 1963, site preparation was to begin soon for the first regional shopping center in Puerto Rico, it had been reported by J. I. Kislak Inc., of Newark, N. J., named by the Fonalledas brothers of San Juan, developers of the project, to direct the planning, leasing, promotion, and financing of the first stage of the center. To be known as Plaza Las Américas, the retail facility would have approximately 900 feet of frontage on Franklin D. Roosevelt Avenue, directly opposite the city's new $5 million municipal stadium. Initial plans called for construction of an $8 million first section, which would contain approximately 550,000 square feet of retail store space. This section would cover about 50 acres in the development. Parking space would be provided for 4,200 cars. The center had been planned to give the largest possible number of local merchants an opportunity to solve their needs for expansion, as well as their parking and traffic problems. One of two major department stores, including a local one, would form the hub of a 55 store development. According to the Kislak realty firm, merchants at the Plaza Las Américas shopping center would provide the widest variety of products and services ever assembled in Puerto Rico at one location. The shopping center was being designed by Lathrop Douglass, New York architect, in cooperation with Sacmag of Puerto Rico Inc., a leading architectural and engineering firm in San Juan at the time. Douglass and his associates had designed more than 40 large shopping centers throughout the United States.

On January 26, 1964, Macy's, New York department store, was reported seriously considering opening a store in the Plaza Las Américas, which would be the largest shopping center on the island when completed. Construction had just started and it would be an estimated two years before completion. Representatives from Macy's arrived on the island that week to confer with officials of the shopping center. If satisfactory leasing terms could be arranged there was a strong possibility Macy's would open up there. This would be its first store outside of the continental United States.

On January 18, 1965, it was reported that JCPenney had signed a lease for a major retail unit in Plaza Las Américas shopping center, in San Juan, Puerto Rico. Announcement was made by the J. I. Kislak Organization which was representing the owners of the planning, leasing, financing, and promotion of the center. Slated for construction to start October 1965, Plaza Las Américas would occupy a 120-acre (49 ha) site fronting approximately 1,000 ft (12,000 in) on Franklin D. Roosevelt Avenue, directly opposite the Municipal Stadium, in the geographic center of the city. The new store would comprise 170,000 sq ft (16,000 m^{2}) of floor space, and would be the largest department store ever built in Puerto Rico, as well as one of the largest in the Penney chain. In its first stage, Plaza Las Américas would have 550,006 square feet of floor space, and would feature a completely enclosed, air-conditioned, all weather mall, for the comfort and convenience of shoppers. Investment for the entire project is expected to reach $3 million, which would also include an area devoted to high-rise apartments. Lathrop Douglas was the architect, in cooperation with Sagmag, of Puerto Rico. The Kislak firm reported that approximately 70 stores will be located in the center, and that negotiations were currently underway with a retailing chain for another major department store, which would complement the Penney unit. In addition, Kislak said, firm commitments had already been obtained from representative local concerns for a substantial number of stores in the retail hub. Owners of the property were Jeronimo and Jaime Fonalledas, of San Juan. They were represented at the signing by their local counsel, Jaime Saldana, and by Arthur Levin, of New York. The J. C. Penney Company was represented by Everett Moore, then vice-president, and by Elting Smith, the chain's counsel. Negotiations for Penney were conducted by Ralph P. Betts. The 1,700-store at the time Penney chain, founded in 1902, expected to reported sales in excess of $2 billion this year.

On March 18, 1966, it was reported that a Newark based firm had provided mortgage financing for the largest regional shopping center in Latin America. The J. I. Kislak Organization reported that its Mortgage Division has arranged an $11,000,000 mortgage for 25 years with The Equitable Life Assurance Society on Plaza Las Américas, a 596,000 square foot retailing complex being built in the Hato Rey section of San Juan, Puerto Rico. Scheduled for completion in the fall of 1967, Plaza Las Américas covered a 55 acre tract at Franklin D. Roosevelt Avenue and Las Americas Express, opposite the municipal stadium. The Kislak Organization was the development consultant and leasing broker for the owners, the Fonalledas family, of San Juan. Major tenant of the new shopping hub would be the J. C. Penney Co., with a 277,000 square foot department store, one of the largest in its nationwide chain at the time. The F. W. Woolworth Co. would also have a 48,000 square foot variety store. More than 30 stores by this point were leased. Among them were units of the Pueblo Supermarkets chain, First Federal Savings and Loan Association, Commonwealth Theatres, Thom McAn Shops, Singer Sewing Machine Co., and many other large San Juan retailers.

On July 15, 1967, it was reported that Plaza Las Américas, Inc. held its first meeting of tenants and architects that day at the site of the shopping center that was being built in Hato Rey. All tenants were invited. It was the first time that Plaza Las Américas had invited to see the progress of the construction. The huge shopping center, which would have space for approximately 75 tenants. The site was 50 acres of land with parking facilities for approximately 4,000 cars. Plaza Las Americas would have 750,000 square feet of air-conditioned retail space including the 3 J.C. Penney floors. One of the main aspects of Plaza Las Américas was its air-conditioned gallery. Approximately 14 acres of land would be occupied with buildings that would house the stores. J. I. Kislak Organization were the exclusive leasing agents for Plaza Las Américas. Peter Jacobson, the center's project manager, said tenants were invited along with their architects and decorators to see how construction was going. According to Jacobson, Plaza Las Américas would be finished by the fall of 1968. The purpose of this meeting, according to Jim Vickers, manager at the time of J. I. Kislak, was to show tenants and their architects the many advantages of an enclosed gallery. This was a new business concept that had never been used in Puerto Rico. All the stores would be open to the gallery, offering the buyer absolute comfort and protection from inclement weather and traffic, and at the same time a pleasant atmosphere that invited shopping. Vickers said that Plaza Las Américas would have a Spanish motif in its architecture. Sacmag of P. R. were the architects for the project. In addition to J.C. Penney, the Kislak Organization was negotiating with other major local department stores to occupy approximately 10% of all leasable space. Among the tenants and officers who attended the meeting were Don Jerónimo and Jaime Fonalledas, main owners of Plaza Las Américas: representatives of J.C. Penney; Joseph Aramanda, Senior Vice President of the J.I. Kislak Organization; John Kelly, Kislak VP and executives of the 75 tenants that would occupy the site. Jacobson explained that Plaza Las Américas was employing 400 men in the construction work, but he expected that in the following 60 days the number would rise to 700. He reported that the gallery would have a park with water fountains and notably an area where children can play. "This will be one of the largest and most modern shopping malls. Plaza Las Américas will have a wide variety of stores, from large department stores to a movie theater. It will be a city within a city," Jacobson said. Among the many local firms that would occupy Plaza Las Américas were: Pueblo, Lema, Velasco, Clubman, Tartak, La Favorita, Bird's, Naveira, and the First Federal Savings and Loan Association.

On October 28, 1967, The J. I. Kislak Organization of Newark, N. J., announced that González Padín, Puerto Rico's oldest and best known department store chain at the time, had signed a multi-million dollar lease for a 2-story, 76,500 square foot building in Plaza Las Américas, the air conditioned regional shopping center being built. The $35 million shopping hub, to be the largest on the island, was scheduled to open in fall of 1968. This was the second major department store brought by the Kislak realty firm, the center's exclusive leasing broker, to Plaza Las Americas. Kislak had previously announced that the J. C. Penny Company would have a 3-story, 277,000 square foot store there.

On November 30, 1967, it was reported that it was expected that by August 1968 the gigantic commercial project that would bear the name of Plaza Las Américas would be inaugurated, in Hato Rey. The mall was being built at a cost of $35 million. This would be the most modern and complete shopping center in Latin America, and only comparable with some in the big cities of the United States, revealed the general manager of the project, Mr. Peter Jacobson. Construction, which was on track and expected to be completed according to plan, began in April that year. Plaza Las Américas already had 90 percent of its space, said Mr. Jacobson, with 72 commercial companies that have separate premises. These included two theaters owned by Commonwealth Theaters, the largest of the 80 spaces J.C. Penney, a Pueblo grocery store, a Velasco branch, another González Padín, Tartak, Petrie, Woolworth, and two banks: a branch of First Federal and another of First National City. The project had 800,000 square feet of floor space, said Mr. Jacobson, and free parking space for 4,000 vehicles. A few of the mall's outstanding facilities were, gardens, fountains, benches, terrazzo floor and other facilities, through which you would be able to reach all the shops and establishments in the shopping mall. The only one comparable at the time to this promenade is one that joined a commercial sector in the city of Montreal, said Mr. Jacobson. The architects who planned the plaza tried to preserve the traditional Spanish structure in the arcades, vaulted ceilings and wooden beams in the low ceilings. Plaza Las Américas was of the type known as a "regional shopping center". The owners were Puerto Ricans, the Fonalledas family. For the construction, the initial loan was granted by the First National City Bank and the long-term loan by the Equitable Life Insurance Co. It was being built by the company Sacmag. It had three accesses: one by the Las Américas Expressway and another by Roosevelt Avenue and the third by the side street that was being built together with the project. The idea of this shopping center, said Mr. Jacobson, was that the person upon entering it was able to find where to carry out all their errands, from recreation, restaurants, shops, beauty salons, banks, laundries, etc. All day the doors would be kept open, closing only at night, said Mr Jacobson, as access to the shops was by through the walk. It was 1,500 feet long and by 40 feet wide and consisted of three sections, one long and two more cross sections. The highest and most spectacular points of the covered promenade would be in front of González Padín and J. C. Penney stores, according to Mr. Jacob. He added that the inauguration of Plaza Las Américas was to be held in August.

On September 12, 1968, the Plaza las Américas shopping mall would officially inaugurate. The large complex of buildings, comprising a fully air-conditioned commercial space, occupies an area of 54 acres, with free parking facilities for 4,000 cars. And it was, definitively, a contribution of the Puerto Rican initiative to the growing social and economic development of the country at the time. With 850,000 square feet of construction, Plaza Las Américas, in its first stage, housed in its then modern structure that followed the harsh lines of colonial architecture in its exterior design, 79 establishments, including a branch of González Padín, Mueblerías Tartak, First Federal Savings, Joyería Naveira, Farmacias González, Velasco, Pueblo Supermarkets, and other important local firms, eighty percent of which were Puerto Rican. Likewise, in the Plaza Las Américas Shopping Center, which opened that day, J. C. Penney's opened in Puerto Rico, a store with a space of 278,000 square feet, considered the largest establishment built by the chain in any of the markets where it operated. With the name of Plaza Theaters 1 and 2, the cinema opened as a two twin movie theater, in fact, the second of its kind in Puerto Rico at the time, in which they would present weekly premieres to the delight of the public. In Plaza Las Américas, the concept of providing the public with extensive facilities had been developed, not only so that they could benefit from an extensive selection of products and services, which could be purchased from a single stop in the center, but also so that they could enjoy the same throughout the day. These facilities included the Center Gallery, fully air-conditioned, magnificently decorated with tiled ropes ornamented with a profuse variety of tropical plants, seating areas, and the pleasant atmosphere that reigned throughout the establishment; nine establishments where food and refreshments were sold; the twin theaters with a capacity for 1,600 people, banking and savings facilities, pharmacies, and all kinds of 'boutiques' were also featured in this massive shopping destination. Plaza Las Américas was considered the most spectacular shopping center in Latin America and Puerto Rico, standing out, both for its design and its facilities, among the most modern and attractive in the United States at the time.

The following year, the architectural design of Plaza Las Américas would win the URBE Award for Best Commercial Architecture On September 13, 1968, it was reported that on Inauguration day around 35,000 people arrived at the newly opened Plaza las Américas at the time.

On July 17, 1969, it was reported that during the month of August of that year, Plaza Las Américas would have another service that would increase the benefits enjoyed by the many consistent customers of the largest shopping center in Latin America at the time. This would be the Shell service center, which would be located on the center grounds and would sell gasoline, oil and car accessories. Diagnostics of a mechanical nature would also be offered.

On September 10, 1969, with a cocktail party attended by prominent figures of Puerto Rican commerce and banking, the first anniversary of the commercial complex of Plaza las Américas was celebrated. The event was attended by a large number of representatives of the 79 commercial establishments located in Plaza las Américas the at the time largest shopping center in Latin America. Miss Rosita Fonalledas, one of the founders of Plaza Las Américas lit the symbolic candle and cut the cake on the first anniversary of the shopping complex. Miss Rosita Fonalledas was accompanied at the event by her other three siblings: Geronimo, Jaime, and Gerardo. José Antonio Gorbea, administrator of the commercial complex said that "Plaza Las Americas has been more successful than expected." He pointed out that none of those originally established in the shopping complex had suspended their operations. He further stated that the two banks that reside there have also had a good year of operations. For his part, Mr. Manuel Fernández. President of the Plaza Merchants Association stated that "the Puerto Rican community has supported us in this first year of operations." He indicated that "all the merchants have informed us that they have had higher sales than they expected in their first year of being here." Another who expressed his opinion, Mr. Gordon Peterson, General Manager of the store J.C. Penney at the time noted that "we are extremely pleased with the operation of our establishment in Plaza Las Americas."

=== 1970–1989: Expanding ===
In March 1970, Woolworth's would open its first Harvest House Grill in Puerto Rico at the mall, accompanying the Woolworth's Restaurant which had been a staple at the mall up to that point.

On June 10, 1975, it was reported that the management of the Sears store chain had set the goal of opening two new stores in Puerto Rico for the year 1978, as was announced during a telephone interview by Robert B. Gibson, then President of Sears Roebuck de Puerto Rico, Inc. According to Gibson, Sears management at the time was in negotiations with the management of Plaza Las Américas, Inc., owners of the Plaza las Américas shopping complex, for the construction of a new Sears store in the shopping center. The store would be similar in size to the ones Sears that operated at the time in Hato Rey and Bayamón, and would be located in an extension of Plaza las Américas, towards the north side of the mall. The new store would be approximately 300,000 square feet of retail, office and warehouse space, covering approximately 135,000 square feet of retail space.

On December 7, 1975, one of the main corridors of Plaza Las Américas anchored by González Padín was decorated with Christmas motifs and decorations, reflecting the joy of the season. To the left, in the background, you could see the tall and colorful Christmas tree that was placed in the aforementioned corridor.

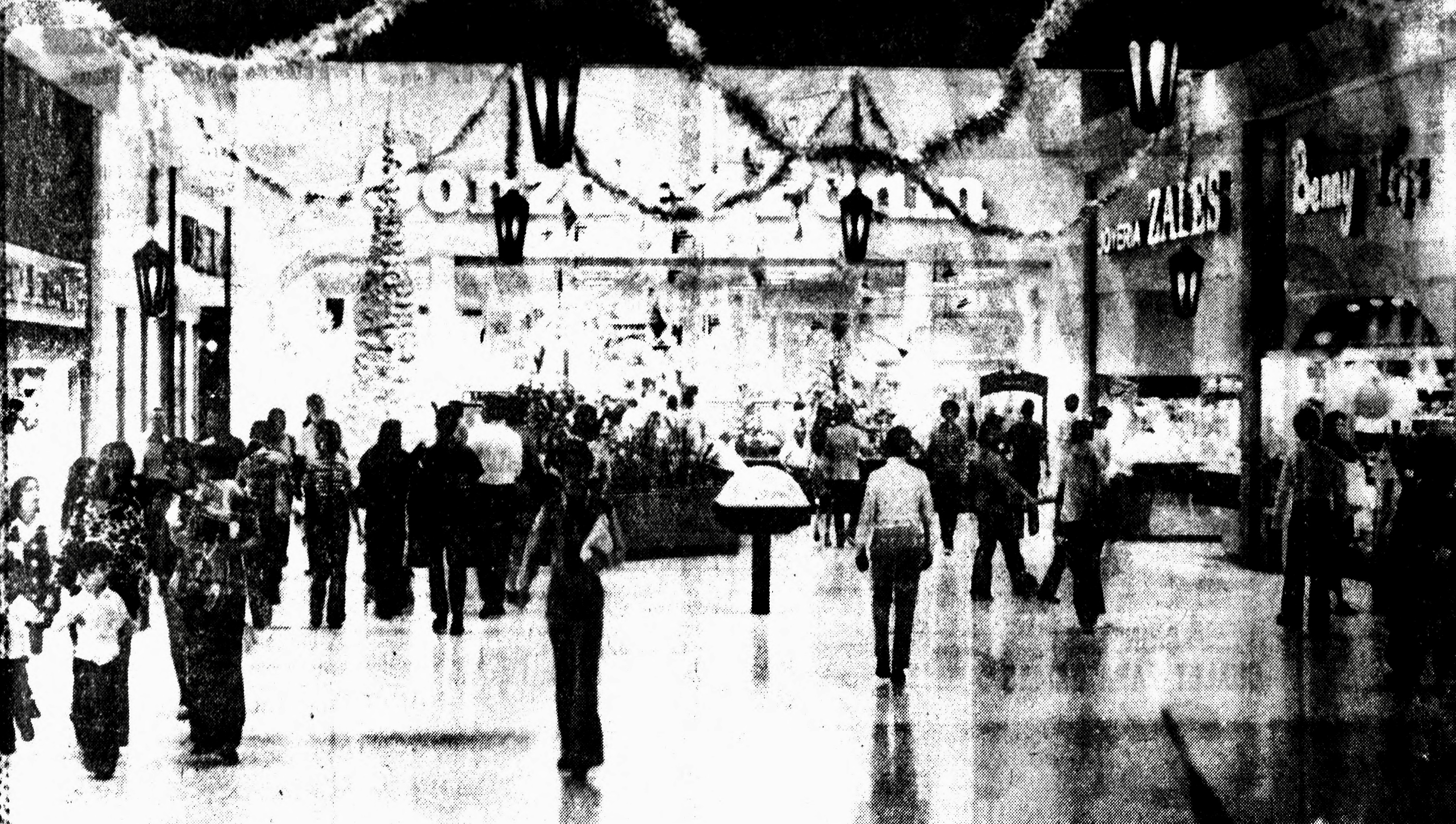
González Padín corridor decorated at Plaza las Américas in 1975

On November 26, 1976, a new Baskin Robbins Ice Cream store would open next to the Plaza Theatres.

On September 3, 1978, on Plaza las Américas 10th anniversary new plans for expansion would be announced. Plaza la Américas, had proposed to enlarge its image and grow to become the largest commercial Regional Center in Latin America. To do this, the following would be done step by step. The center expansion project, which had begun recently, entailed the ambitious plan to provide the people of Puerto Rico with the largest and best number of conveniences within a single area. Hence its impressive growth rate: from 840,000 to 1,400,000 square feet. To offer the most varied selection of merchandise, the number of stores would increase from 76 to 185; and among others, it would have the largest Sears store in Puerto Rico, in a 280,000 square foot building. Regarding the parking area, there will be a total of more than 5,500 parking spaces, including a parking building with space for eight hundred mobile cars. Parking in this building would be free. The building would have a panoramic elevator, interior stairs and covered bridges for pedestrians, which would connect directly with the central galleries of the expansion, on each of its levels. Two independent ramps would facilitate the entry and exit of cars to the parking building, which would be partitioned off by the parking area. J.C. Penney's. In addition to the additional parking areas, the concept of the access roads to the center had to be completely changed, as well as the parking areas themselves. At the same time, the lighting in the parking lot was being remodeled, for which the existing light poles would be replaced by ones that were one hundred feet high, similar to those used on highways. This represented a significant advance, since in addition to projecting more effective lighting, it constituted a more efficient measure for the conservation of electrical energy. There would be a third level of 44,000 square feet, which would be dedicated exclusively to the sale of all kinds of food and entertainment. This area would remain open at night, so that everyone who attends the two theaters that will open there, as well as its amusement rooms, could fully enjoy the international food restaurants that would remain open every night of the week. A gigantic skylight would illuminate this entire area, which would also have various fast food service stands. Once the expansion was complete, it would not be possible to distinguish between the original central gallery and the new ones, since all the architectural elements used in the expansion would also be used in the existing areas. The roofs would have skylights at intervals, allowing light from outside to come in nicely. The floors, made of ceramic tiles in natural colors, would have shades that would vary by section to avoid monotony. There would be countless seating areas, with comfortable benches and attractive ornamental plants. Two ornamental fountains would be located, one in front of González Padín and the other at an intermediate point between J. C. Penny's and Sears. A modern gazebo specially designed to make them look more attractive would be provided. The gazebo would be located in front of J. C. Penney's, and would be raised two or three feet above ground level, so that it would be more visible to all. On December 28, 1978, the president of Sears Roebuck de Puerto Rico, Inc. at the time, R. B. Gibson, announced the final closing of the Sears store in Hato Rey had already begun. Gibson said that all the merchandise in the Hato Rey store would be sold "because we don't want to move any merchandise to our new store in Plaza las Américas." The liquidation would include not only the merchandise, but also the shelves, office equipment and articles shop decorations. "The decision to close Hato Rey and move to Plaza was a very difficult one to make, as our Hato Rey store has always been one of the most successful stores in the entire organization; however, the continued increase in sales of said store required moving to Plaza Las Américas, where we will be able to serve our customers with approximately fifty percent more sales space," added Gibson. The Hato Rey Sears store was inaugurated on November 2, 1962.

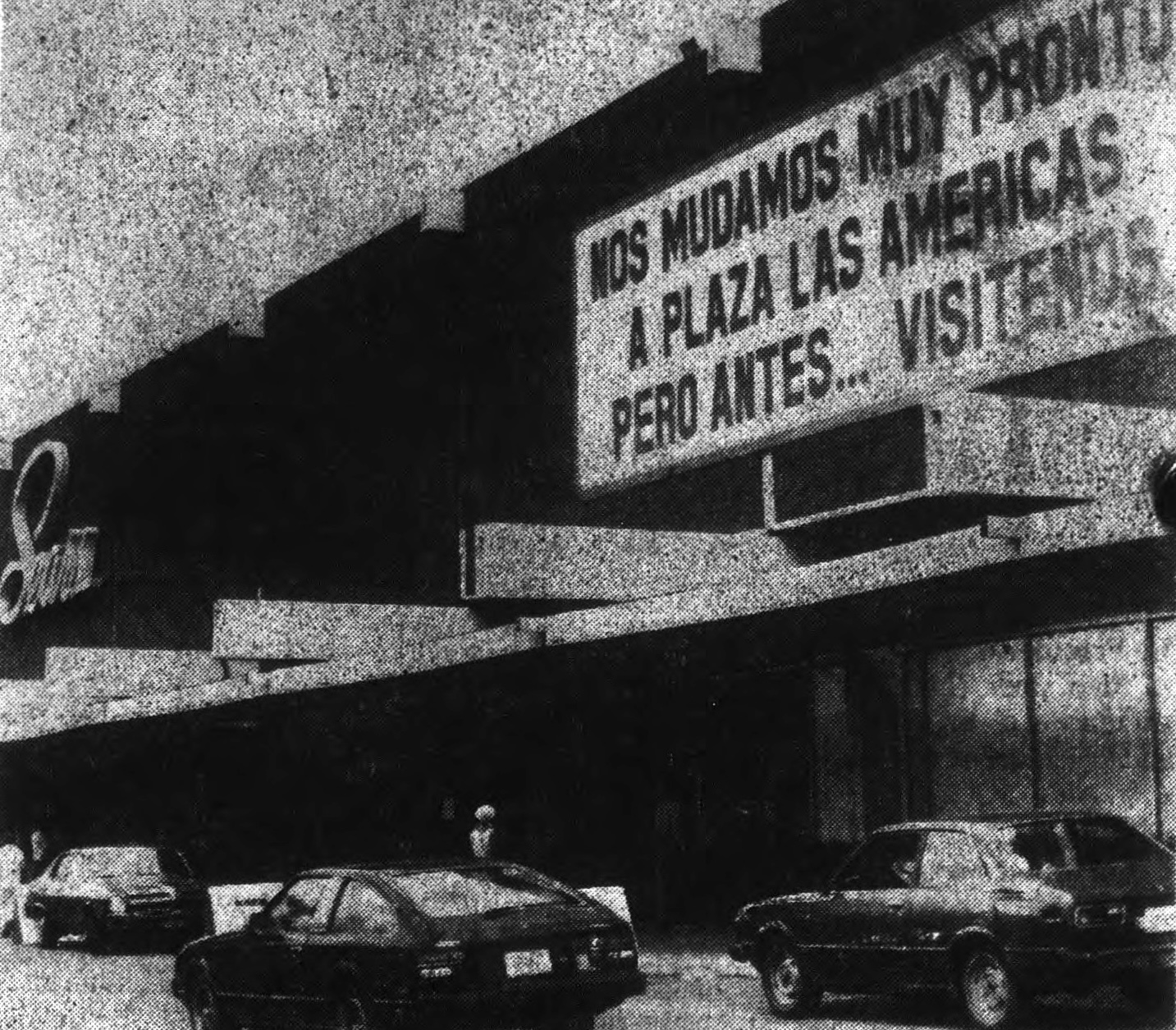
Sears in Hato Rey moving to Plaza las Américas in 1978

On February 11, 1978, it was reported that the honorable Mayor of San Juan, Dr. Hernán Padilla would be cutting the ribbon for the opening of the new Sears store at Plaza Las Américas during the ceremony that would take place on Monday, February 12 at 9:30 am.

On September 23, 1979, on Plaza las Américas 11th anniversary. Plaza las Américas would have 183 stores in total and an office building, after the expansions which would be completed the following year. The first step of the expansions was already a reality in the new stores integrated in an extension of the first level and in a second level. The expansion meant a total investment of $22 million for the center, which was added to the $15 million original investment. Of that $22 million, $2 million went toward redecorating the interiors of the entire mall to integrate with the expansions to create an integrated center in terms of appearance and unify the architectural theme. This included installing new flooring, new roofs, painting the complex, paving and redistributing the parking lot, removing poles and replacing them with a new, more efficient lighting system. New fountains designed and manufactured by Crystal Fountains were also being installed. One of them was the tallest in proportion to the confined space built by that renowned firm. Doing a bit of history, Mr. Joseph H. Martin, general manager of Plaza Las Américas, commented that the shopping complex was inaugurated on September 12, 1968, with 76 stores in 747,000 square feet on a 55-acre property. The expansions, which had since been envisioned, now utilize a 75-acre site and 1,228,000 square feet of space. Precisely for having planned expansions for the Plaza, the original building was located on the corner of the land. Another department store was expected to be added to the set of stores. Of vital importance that an expansion had to include was the integration of specialty stores to complement the general merchandise stores, so that gaps could be filled. For this reason, when granting space in the Plaza, a very careful selection was made, with the idea that the public manages to get all those peculiarities that are difficult to find in general stores. Another need that was seen as part of the expansion plan, according to Mr. Martin, was the reorganization of the sites for meals and entertainment. There was not enough variety, apart from the fact that they had to be placed where there could be easy access to them at times when the stores were not open. That's where the idea of the third level came from. A food and entertainment center called "La Terraza". It would be an area with tables and chairs around which there will be several fast food outlets. You could choose between Italian, Chinese food, sandwiches and other varieties. People would buy and go to the tables to enjoy it. Two additional cinemas, a game room, a fishmonger, a butcher and two restaurants would be located on the same floor. At the other extreme, the facilities that belonged to the Cervantes Restaurant would soon be available to turn that corner into another food and entertainment center. In terms of parking, Plaza increased its capacity from 4,000 to 5,900 spaces. Its new parking building also provided 1,050 spaces. The culmination of the Plaza's expansion program would be the 11-story tower whose plans were complete and construction was to begin early the following year. "An office tower on this shopping center provides a work climate that is difficult to duplicate in a conventional commercial sector. It has the unbeatable advantages of Express, parking, shops, food, and we are convinced of its success," said the general manager of Plaza las Américas. Since services could not be missing in an expansion plan of this magnitude, Plaza would now have a Care Center Daytime for children by Mrs. Annabel Ubarri. Mothers and fathers would be able to buy in peace after leaving the children in those facilities that had access through the second level of the shopping center. Two additional services that Plaza would offer would be, in the first instance, a photocopying center; and a Center for Government Agencies where customers can carry out simple transactions for the Aqueduct and Sewer Authority, the Telephone Company and the Fluvial Sources Authority. Finally, in the long term, this super regional shopping center plans to use six acres to its west to develop a small shopping center where a series of services difficult to find in Puerto Rico, but very necessary, which would be established. It was expected that the primary tenant at that facility would be a home care facility. The interior design of Plaza Las Américas would be the work of the architects Orval Sifontes and Nikita Zukov, while the construction works were in charge of Bird Construction, Pavarini Construction, Desarrollos Metropolitanos and ORM Construction. On August 19, 1981, on the first floor of the mall being located in front of Velasco, Command Performance would inaugurate a salon in Plaza las Américas.

On January 27, 1983, La Terraza would be the focus of the plans for Plaza Las Américas that year, according to the mall's then Marketing Director, Miss April Hough. She made known the interest of the administration of Plaza Las Américas in promoting La Terraza for the conveniences that its food facilities represent for the public, which were open from 8 am some and from 10 am others, until 10 pm seven days a week. That is why a year earlier they had animated the place with live music and this year they were organizing a varied series of activities. For March, in terms of activities in the mall, they were already working in coordination with the Women's Affairs Commission to organize activities aimed at celebrating Women's Week, from March 6 to 12. As for stores, others would soon open their doors in addition to two that opened in December, T. Shirt Place and Euromodas. On the other hand, Empresas Fonalledas owners of Plaza las Américas, had long-term plans. One was to open another mall in Ponce, under the name of Plaza del Caribe and they had also recently acquired the Arecibo Mall in Arecibo. Another plan, for eventual development, was the construction of an 11-story office tower on top of Plaza las Américas (which would be considered as a 7-story structure). Around the surrounding grounds, Miss Hough replied that they were receiving proposals of what could be done there. In Plaza Las Américas they were optimistic about the sales of 1983, judging by the month of January that "it's been very good." On March 11, 1984, Plaza las Américas would be called an "all-consuming passion". The 15-year-old operation at the time had been a huge financial success. Its $240 million in annual sales had put it among the top 2% of the 35,000 shopping centers around the world. J.C. Penney's plaza store was the chain's nationwide sales leader. Elderly retired men sat on the mall's benches, reading and animatedly discussing teenagers parading around a large fountain that spurted to the ceiling; and families with tots in strollers often occupy most of the 960 tables on the huge third floor "food court", where Burger King, Orange Julius and 17 other eateries vie for the fast-food dollar. On November 21, 1985, amid immense hullabaloo, illuminations, and Christmas decorations, the seasonal decoration of Plaza Las Américas was lavishly inaugurated. To artistically celebrate such a great event, the management of the shopping center designed a program spectacular in which the orchestra of the Escuela Libre de Música, directed by Randolfo Juarbe, took part, as well as student choirs and the little violinists who studied at the Julio Sellés Solá school directed by the Professor Mario Rosa. The contagious notes of the traditional Christmas carols and Puerto Rican Christmas bonuses were heard in the Immense area of the Plaza, at about 7 at night forming a great choral mass, which was joined by the voices of many of the excited parishioners who watched spellbound events. The Plaza's beautiful Christmas decorations were coordinated by Timi's, and spanned all three levels of the enormous building. In front of the J.C. Penney, on the permanent dais where usually assembly is carried out exhibitions, the decorators created a snowy forest, in which tiny beings were found. The decoration in the galleries and corners of the shopping center, however, followed a different trend. In several sections there were trees on high platforms, surrounded by wooden gates, decorated with countless objects and garlands of multicolored lights. Numerous gift boxes, splendidly decorated with ribbons and festive paper, decorated the foot of each tree, which could be white or green. Through corridors and stairs, luminous spikes, multicolored bombs brightened the passage of concurrent. Each store collaborated by decorating their front of the store according to the merchandise that was sold, be it toys, clothing, dolls, porcelain, jewelry, crystals. The public thoroughly enjoyed the show, demonstrating it with the incessant applause that forced the orchestra to continue playing. Since the week earlier, Plaza Las Américas, aware of the number of people who flocked to said center, had started a very special valet service (at a cost of $2.00) to park your car and avoid the huge traffic jams that formed there. When requesting the service, they would give you a coupon that would allow you to claim your car when you had finished shopping.

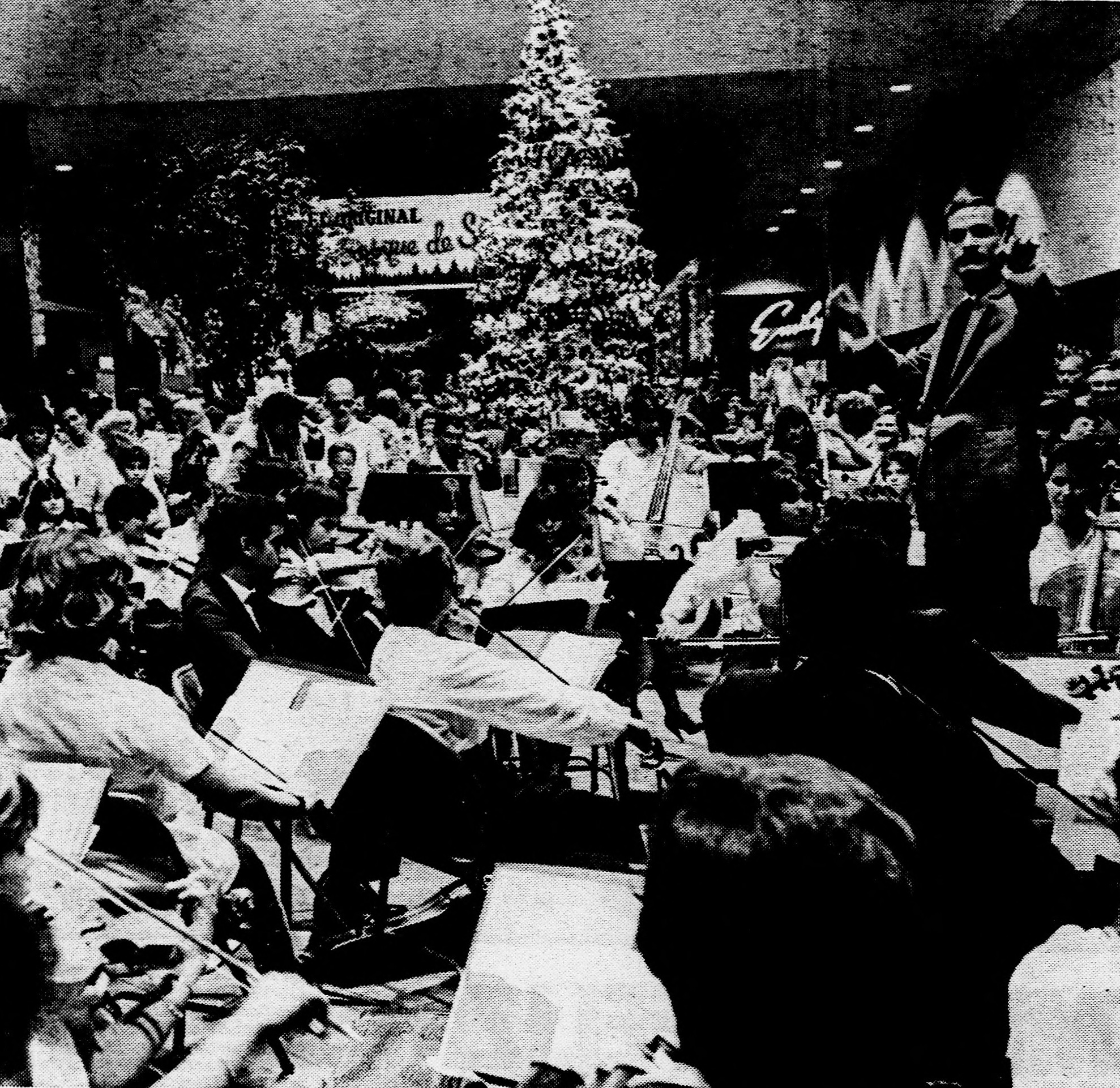
Christmas decorations at Plaza las Américas in front of J. C. Penney in 1985

On September 10, 1986, on the occasion of the celebration of the Eighteenth anniversary of Plaza Las Américas, the idea of designing an emblem that would reflect the theme of the celebrations arose. The emblem would be used on the different banners, posters and advertisements that would decorate the majestic shopping center. Thus, Abner Gutiérrez, creative director of Image Developers Group, was in charge of bringing this idea of the emblem to life at the time. He designed a stylized woman's face, which highlighted the feminine style required for the theme. To achieve this, he used the parameters established by Plaza's management: celebration of the 18th anniversary, theme News of fashion, with an emphasis on the feminine. "Taking the parameters into account, I decided to develop a female face, which would represent a universal woman. I designed a face because fashion includes clothing, shoes, makeup, etc., and I did not want to tie the design to a specific fashion." Gutierrez explained. He added that the design was so universal that it managed to place women as the centerpiece of fashion, not fashion as something that governs women. Regarding the design style, Gutiérrez indicated that it is of the art-deco type, because that period (art-deco) had a great impact on the development of fashion at a popular level. In detail, the design was a stylization of a woman's profile with thick lines. The lines are thick, he clarified, because the type of use that will be given to the emblem is prevented, for example, reproduction on posters and press advertisements. In view of this possibility, Gutiérrez explained, it was necessary to develop a simple but visually strong design that, regardless of the type of reproduction to which it was subjected, would maintain and reflect the theme of women. The colors of the design are pink and gunmetal gray. "Pink because it is definitely a color associated with women and gunmetal because it is a neutral color that is very popular among fashion designers and creates a very nice combination with pink," explained Gutiérrez. Along with the design of the emblem, Gutiérrez prepared in his studio the art that would be used in the different pennants and posters that would adorn Plaza Las Américas in its great celebration.

On June 27, 1987, Plaza Las Américas was considered the commercial emporium of Puerto Rico, and even of the Caribbean, the shopping center would be greatly strengthened with the prompt construction of a super modern eleven-story office tower according to Roberto Trápaga, from Plaza Leasing, Inc., the developer of the project, which would be known as One Plaza Tower. The realization of this project responded to the visionary plans of the originators of Plaza Las Américas, who anticipated the growth and success of Plaza as a shopping center, and estimated that in the near future it would be necessary to expand the structural services of the complex. That future had arrived, and the answer to those needs of the dynamic Puerto Rican society was One Plaza Tower. "The world of shopping centers is something more than the unification of several stores. For this purpose, the concept that a center should be characterized by its mixed uses has been developed. This concept has been successful. And also, it has not been conflictive regarding the use of entertainment facilities. and services", explained Trápaga. With the construction of One Plaza Tower, Plaza Las Américas would become a faithful example of the concept of mixed uses, according to Trápaga, since apart from including the current facilities, it would add a building that would house all kinds of community service offices. "When you have such a continuous transit of people, the integration of different commercial aspects is more than necessary." he said. One Plaza Tower further complemented the evolution of Plaza Las Américas. "We knew that in the future we would have to build an office tower. In this sense, and with a very accurate vision of the future, what is currently the square was built and integrated into the complex, so that in the future it would serve as a structural base for an office tower (One Plaza Tower)", he emphasized. One Plaza Tower would be an integral part of the Plaza, with access to all its facilities: shops, restaurants, banking institutions, travel agencies, post offices, etc. According to Trápaga, the tower would be a first-class building with the most conveniences, advanced location, 6,000 parking spaces (free), complete fire protection (smoke detectors, alarms, sprinkler system, smoke extractors) and capacity for a helicopter to land. The project which was to be finished by the end of 1988, had a cost of approximately $18 million. As for the building, the entrance will be through the parking lot or the third level (La Terraza); the floors would be numbered from 4 to 14, not including 13, from floors 5 to 14 there would be 16,200 square feet for rent. Floors 4 and 15 would have approximately 15,265 rentable square feet.

On November 11, 1989, it was reported that Toys "R" Us, the largest toy store in the world at the time, was building its largest physical plant in the world on the grounds of Plaza las Américas, reported Guillermo Alvarez, director of Toys "R" Us in Puerto Rico. The store, the largest of 541 in the world, would be located in a 67,000 square foot building that was currently in the completion phase of its construction. "Right now we are working on the finishes, as well as paving the parking lot that covers a space of 31 square meters," said engineer Edris Méndez, project manager for F & R Construction, the general contractor firm that was in charge of the project. The area designated for the Toys "R" Us store would be shared in the future with a Pueblo Xtra supermarket. "The format of this new store, which we will open on December 1, will be the same as 95% of the Toys "R" Us stores in the world," Alvarez said. What made it the biggest is that there would be a huge warehouse area with a total of 37,000 square feet. The remaining area would be conditioned for sales.

=== 1990–1999: Further expansion ===
On July 22, 1990, it would be reported that a Maternity Exclusive store inaugurated its new facilities on the first level of Plaza Las Américas. Nereida and Gerardo Márquez, owners of Maternity Exclusive, gave the guests a rich reception, where prominent personalities from the Plaza Las Américas business, and from the artistic environment such as Charityn and her then husband Elín Ortiz were present.

On August 16, 1990, it was reported that Plaza las Américas would be expanded to accommodate new stores, exhibition areas, and five new cinemas, according to documents submitted to the Planning Board. This expansion was in addition to the proposed construction of an 11-story office tower on the third floor of Plaza las Américas, which was long planned by this point. The proposed project consisted of the construction of two additional floors above the Velasco store with an area of approximately 72,000 square feet. The second of the new levels would be used to house new shops and display areas. The new cinemas would be located on the third level, which would have a total capacity of 2,039 seats. The expansion of the Velasco building and the remodeling of the third level of the shopping center was being designed by the designers Méndez, Brunner & Asociados. Despite several calls to the offices of the owners of Plaza las Américas, Las Empresas Fonalledas, it was not possible to know the total cost of this project or additional details of it. A source alleged to the project explained that the three cinemas that were currently located on the third level of the Plaza at the time would be eliminated and the space would be used to add fast food establishments in the La Terraza area. Likewise, in the space occupied by the Plaza III, Plaza IV and Plaza V cinemas, a community hall would be built for business meetings and public service. "The Community Room will be used for public services such as blood donations, taxpayer orientation, etc," indicated the memorandum on the project submitted to the Planning Board. The project would also require an increase of 366 parking spaces. The project was in the permitting stage and precisely on the 7th of that month, the Planning Board held public hearings on the petition that was presented by representatives of Méndez, Brunner Asociados.

In 1992 to 1994, an expansion to Plaza las Américas would be done which included an extension of the food court La Terraza, of which the number of restaurants was increased from 19 to 24. The movie theater which was expanded from 5 to 10 screens, and the construction of La Torre de Plaza finally being completed at a cost of $15 million which added 146,000 square feet of rentable space to the retail complex. On March 21, 1994, Burdines with undergoing negotiations at the time expected to start construction on its first Puerto Rico store, at Plaza Las Américas, in the following year. It would be the department store chain's first foray outside of Florida and an initial step into Latin America, said Carey Watson, company spokesman for Burdines.

On October 25, 1995, Pier 1 Imports announced an agreement with Sears Roebuck de Puerto Rico to open six Pier 1 stores inside Sears department stores on the island. The new Pier 1 stores would have 2,000-3.000 square feet of sales space. The first two were scheduled to open in November of that year in the Sears store at Plaza las Américas, and in the Sears Homelife store at the Galerías Paseos shopping mall in San Juan.

On October 31, 1995, González Padín would announce the closure and liquidation of all its stores due to economic issues. The closure began on the 30th, with the closure of its main store, the one in Plaza las Américas, and the dismissal of the many employees who worked there. This would also include Velasco, which was owned by González Padín. The chain would completely close by December of that year.

In 1996, a $246 million renovation was announced. Which consisted of the construction of a new 4-level (300,700 square foot) J. C. Penney. Which was being built on the west side of the existing store. And the repurposing the old Penney's building once moved out as 3 levels of inline store and restaurant space.

In 1998, the J. C. Penney store at Plaza las Américas would re-inaugurate in a new building at the mall replacing the original at the time 30-year-old store, then becoming the largest store in the chain and being No. 1 in sales and profit that year. On April 8, 1998, it was announced by company officials of the J. C. Penney store at Plaza las Américas, that a 70,000 square foot expansion would be opening, bringing the size of the store to 350,000 square feet. The four story expansion would be accessible by a tunnel from the existing store. J. C. Penney's had higher average sales in Puerto Rico than in its stores in the United States that year. It had five stores in Puerto Rico and planned to open two more in 1999 in the towns of Caguas and Humacao.

On April 23, 1998, it would be reported that Kmart in November of that year would be inaugurating a store in Plaza Las Américas, which would be the largest store of the chain on the Island with 144,000 square feet.

On July 30, 1998, it was reported that Plaza las Américas, was about to grow even more. Over the next two years, the mall would add about 600,000 square feet to its current size at the time and about 100 new stores, including the first two-story Big Kmart in the United States and its territories, as well as the first Macy's store to be established in the island. All this for nothing more than about $239 million. Upon completion it was estimated Plaza las Américas would have a total of 1.9 million square feet of retail space. The new establishments, according to the management of the center, would create at least 3,000 new jobs.

On August 18, 1998, it was reported that Federated Department Stores, Inc., said it had reached an agreement to build a Macy's store in San Juan, making for the retailer's first international store. The store, was to begin construction at Plaza Las Américas, later that year, would open in the early fall of 2000. It would occupy three stories and 260,000 square feet. The store would be part of Cincinnati-based Federated's Macy's East division. The division operated 87 stores in 15 states in the eastern United States.

=== 2000–2009 ===
On February 17, 2000, it was reported that Borders, the at the time $2.6 billion American bookstore chain, had chosen the Spanish-speaking U.S. Caribbean island of Puerto Rico for its first "bilingual" superstore. In its cavernous two-story 28,750 square foot space in San Juan's Plaza Las Americas, Borders was building the prototype for a planned push into Latin America. It was a breath of fresh air for Puerto Rico's readers of English, who in the absence of chain bookstores had made do with woefully inferior selections. An opening date was scheduled for February 19.

On June 8, 2000, it was reported that on the south mall area of Plaza las Américas, where Borders was located, would also feature a two-level, 31,000 square foot Old Navy that summer, replacing part of the former space left by González Padín in 1995. Also opening in that summer would be a 13-screen multiplex. Plaza las Américas would also be adding a variety of restaurants on its first floor. Before the year's end, the mall would feature about 10 restaurants on the south side of the mall, which would be a combination of popular priced local and stateside concepts. In that following year, the third floor of J. C. Penney's previous site would be connected through a covered canopy to La Terraza. J. C. Penney's third floor would also feature a 55,000 square foot entertainment and restaurant area.

On June 9, 2000, it was reported that Furniture and home accessories retailer The Bombay Co. would open its doors in Plaza Las Americas in November of that year, said Rodolfo Criscuolo, the company's local licensee. The 2,750 square foot store was to be opened as part of the company's first expansion outside the mainland U.S. it was expected to be among the chain's five best-selling stores, according to a company spokesman.

On October 25, 2000, Macy's opened its first department store outside the mainland United States in San Juan's Plaza Las Americas mall. Thousands of shoppers visited the store on opening day. The location marked Macy's entry into Puerto Rico's competitive retail market as the 186th store in its U.S. chain, adapted to reflect Caribbean tastes, weather, and culture. Macy's selected Puerto Rico for this expansion because many residents were already familiar with the chain from visits to its New York and South Florida locations, and because Plaza Las Américas was recognised as one of the leading retail malls in the northern hemisphere. The store focused primarily on serving local customers rather than tourists. The three story, 260,000-square-foot location offered the designer labels and kitchen departments found in mainland Macy's stores, along with merchandise tailored to the local market. Women's clothing featured brighter, more vibrant colors compared to other Macy's locations, while men's clothing included warm-weather adaptations such as short-sleeved versions of fall colors. By 2000, two local high-end department stores, Velasco and González Padín, had closed. J.C. Penney and Sears had established themselves in Puerto Rico's fashion retail sector, and Macy's positioned itself to address an opening in the market.

On October 4, 2001, it was reported that in those next two months, Plaza las Américas would be adding seven new establishments to its roster. These were Zara, Margarita's, Oriental Palace, Sony Store, The Bombay Co., Ciao Mediterranean, and Constellations. According to Plaza las Américas parent Empresas Fonalledas Communications & Public Relations director Lorraine Vissepo, Spain-based fashion store Zara would be the largest store of the seven new establishments at 16,000 square feet. It was expected to open in November. The Sony Store, would feature technological innovations unavailable elsewhere," Vissepo said, adding that it would occupy 2,369 square feet of the second floor and would open that month. The Bombay Co., a furniture & home decoration store was slated to open in November and would occupy 2,792 square feet. Margarita's, Oriental Palace, and Ciao Mediterranean were restaurants. Margarita's would open in November and occupy 5,770 square feet. Oriental Palace, also opening in November, would occupy 2,782 square feet. Ciao Mediterranean would open in near year end said Vissepo at the time. Constellations, also planned to open during that month, and would occupy 1,029 square feet.

On December 6, 2001, Plaza Las Américas had recently inaugurated a new commercial hallway where the original J. C. Penney used to be. This hallway already featured at the time Margarita's Restaurant, an art exhibit by local artists, and various temporary tenants. Among them were Supershine, Collector's World, Kiosko SALO, Gone Fishing, Chateau Rouge, Mr. Pretzel's, Candy World and Abracadabra. The mall also welcomed new tenants such as Zara, Steve Madden, Bombay, and Naranja. In the following days both Oriental Express and Quicksilver were expected to open.

On March 1, 2003, it was reported that Farmacias El Amal would be opening a store in Plaza las Américas around April of that year, according to Lorraine Vissepo, communications director at the time of Empresas Fonalledas, owners of the mall. The store, the chain's 57th location on the island, would be the first full-service pharmacy in Plaza las Américas since January 1998, when Farmacias Gonzalez an original opening day tenant was closed to allow for the mall's expansion.

On September 25, 2003, Lorraine Vissepo, communications director at Empress Fonalledas, the parent company of Plaza Las Américas, announced that new stores would be opening for business at the mall, with another under construction. She added that the shopping center's performance in terms of sales and traffic remained positive. "There's a lot of movement in the mall; sales have continued to be satisfactory," she said. The stores opening or expanding were Reinhold Jewelry, McDonald's, Adolfo Dominguez, and Cohen's Fashion Optical. Church's Fried Chicken was under renovation, according to Vissepo. She explained that Reinhold was expanding to include space vacated by Thekes bookstore. After the expansion was complete, the jewelry store would occupy a total of 3,663 square feet. McDonald's new restaurant at the mall which required an investment of $1 million would occupy 3,123 square feet. "It will be located in the southern mall, between Macy's and Borders," said Vissepo. Adolfo Dominguez, a Spanish fashion boutique, would occupy 1,194 square feet and would be located on the mall's first floor between Macy's and J.C. Penney. Meanwhile, Cohen's Fashion Optical would occupy the space previously used by women's apparel store Nostalgia; it measured 1,386 square feet.

In 2004, a former Western Auto store on the premises of the mall was converted to a Sears Auto Center.

In September 2005, the longstanding Plaza Theatres, which was by then operated by CineVista Theatres would close. On October 1, 2005, CV Entertainment Group, the owner company of CineVista Theatres, announced an investment of US$6 million to transform the closed movie theater at the food court of Plaza Las Américas into a multimedia entertainment center that as of April 2006, would be known as Galaxy Lanes. It would include a mega bowling alley with 32 lanes, two restaurant areas, two bars (seating 500 people), 16 giant projection screens in the bowling area, a 20'x20' mega screen in the mezzanine area, multiple plasma monitors, wireless Internet connection, a dance floor and a DJ; a stage for live performances, pool tables, VIP rooms for parties, and a cabin for live radio and TV broadcasts. "We are talking about a 40,000 square-feet multimedia entertainment center," said CV Entertainment Group Marketing & Operations VP Osvaldo Gonzalez.

On May 10, 2007, it was reported that Plaza las Américas, was in the midst of finalizing negotiations with San Francisco-based retailer Pottery Barn to open its first store on the island sometime in 2008.

On May 31, 2007, Maxine Clark, founder and chief executive bear of Build-A-Bear Workshop, announced the popular stuffed-animal chain had landed a coveted spot at Puerto Rico's premier shopping center, Plaza Las Américas. The Build-a-Bear store, which was under construction, was expected to open sometime late June to early July of that year featuring its collection of Build-a-Bear customized stuffed animals plus some customized items for the local market for a local flair. The store would be located on the mall's first floor, a couple of doors away from The Gap. In a market where there was practically no entertainment or educational activities for children, 'tweens' (ages 12–16) and for parents and children, Build-a-Bear was poised to become a bare necessity. The Plaza store was the first one of three to four locations expected to open on the island, each with a minimum investment of nearly $1 million and 35-40 full-time and part-time employees. "It was well worth the wait," said Clark during an exclusive interview, referring to the six-year wait to find the ideal location at Plaza Las Américas. "I knew we wanted to be in the Puerto Rico market, but you have to start with the best location. Plaza Las Américas affords us the opportunity to truly showcase our concept and I'm confident our family-oriented concept will win over the people of Puerto Rico. Island customers are warm and friendly people, very congruent with the in-store experience at Build-a-Bear."

On April 10, 2008, it was reported that San Francisco-based West Elm was set to begin operations at its first Puerto Rico store in Plaza Las Américas. During an exclusive interview, Dave DeMattei, president of west elm, confirmed, if successful, the Plaza store could be the first of several to open around the island. The store would have 20,000 square feet with 10,000 of those for selling space.

On March 5, 2009, it was reported that European giant retail beauty chain Sephora, which had revolutionized the U.S. cosmetic market since 1998, was finally coming to Puerto Rico. Sephora representatives, who in the past had shown no interest in the local market, had been in conversations with Plaza Las Américas leasing management for awhile. The Puerto Rico store was part of the chain's multimillion dollar 2009 expansion plan. In 2001, there was an initial approach from the Plaza Las Américas team to Sephora, but to no avail; it was still too early in Sephora's mainland expansion plan. In 2008, during the annual ICSC (International Council of Shopping Centers) convention, it was confirmed Sephora had in fact accepted an invitation from Plaza Las Américas to explore a scenario whereby the company would come to Puerto Rico. Still, Plaza officials kept a tight lid on the matter. But the wait was over. Construction of the first Sephora store was underway in the lower level at Plaza Las Américas, near Radio Shack and West Elm. To accommodate the beauty retailer, Plaza Las Américas had to relocate the former fast food corridor in that area to make room for the new store. The arrival of Sephora on the island, a brand that was already known by many Puerto Rican customers who frequently traveled to the U.S. mainland, would certainly shake up the cosmetic and fragrance business category on the island, which was estimated to generate $100 million in annual sales.

On April 23, 2009, it was reported that Plaza Las Américas was preparing for the arrival of Los Angeles-based Forever 21, which would occupy the former Galaxy Lanes space in the mall's third level which had closed in 2008. The Puerto Rico store would be the chain's first in Latin America. Slated to open that summer. The multi-level 40,000 square foot Forever 21 location at Plaza Las Américas, adjacent to Plaza's La Terraza food court, was the latest flagship addition to the fashion chain with other international flagship operations in Canada, Korea, China and Singapore. It would generate 100 new jobs.

=== 2010–2019 ===
On June 9, 2011, it was reported that San Francisco-based furniture and home retailer Pottery Barn (PB) likely would be closing its Plaza Las Américas store before that year's end. Pottery Barn's exit, however, left space for the mall to relocate Foot Locker to PB's 21,000 square foot location on the main level. Meanwhile, Foot Locker's space would be transformed into a much sexier store to be occupied by Victoria's Secret, according to Plaza Las Américas sources.

On July 18, 2011, it was reported that after 40 years in business, giant book retailer Borders would exit the market entirely and sell off its entire inventory. Borders filed for Chapter 11 of the Bankruptcy Law in February of that year and in Puerto Rico announced that same month the closure of its stores in Carolina and Mayagüez, and the subsequent liquidation. The Plaza Las Américas store was also reported to be closing its doors. In January 2012, it was reported that Plaza las Américas had retained control of the former Borders space. The mall was now in a position to negotiate a future rental agreement of the 34,000 square-foot prime location.

On October 7, 2011, the magical world of the Disney Stores returned to the Plaza Las Américas shopping center after having closed its doors several years earlier. Dozens of eager people gathered at the mall to be the first to enjoy the store that was inaugurated that day. Boxer Tito Trinidad, along with his family, was in charge of opening the store.

On May 23, 2012, it was reported that Plaza Las Américas invested $12 million in remodeling the mall's north entrance facade. The remodeling work began on May 23, 2012, and was completed by mid November 2012, just before the holiday season. In addition, between July–August 2012, expansion began on the multistory parking, located in the southern area of the mall. The expansion extended the five floors of multistory to add over 300 parking spaces. All parking areas of the mall were also repaved while new landscape gardens designs where developed in front of the main entrance.

On December 18, 2012, Plaza Las Américas confirmed that it signed an agreement for the establishment of The Cheesecake Factory in the shopping center. The establishment would have approximately 10,000 square feet and be located next to the new entrance, near Avenida Chardón. Construction of the restaurant was expected to begin in early 2013 and would open its doors to the public during the third quarter of the year. The investment was estimated at around $8 million.

On February 28, 2013, it was reported that Karen Millen would be opening their first store in Puerto Rico at the mall. Plaza Las Américas would also usher in its first Starbucks Coffee shop in the following months, to be located in a 943 square foot space between JCPenney and Macy's.

On April 4, 2014, Sports Authority opened a store at Plaza las Américas. It closed in 2016 due to the chain's bankruptcy.

On May 16, 2016, it would be reported that new stores would arrive at Plaza Las Américas with the announcement of the opening of Zapaventura, BienLatino, a second Starbucks store and Olive Garden. Zapaventura would open in the following weeks, while BienLatino and Starbucks were scheduled to open in August and September of that year, respectively. In the case of Olive Garden, construction would begin in the middle of the year and the opening was scheduled for the first quarter of 2017. Zapaventura, chaired by the former general manager of the Chiquitín stores, would open in the same place that the popular chain of quality children's footwear formerly occupied. They would sell the same shoe lines that were previously offered. Bienlatino, specializing in sandwiches, soups and salads, would open in a space of more than 2,100 square feet, in front of Applebees, on the first level of the south corridor. The new Starbucks store, of approximately 1,500 square feet, would be located in front of the North fountain, right next to the Banco Santander branch and Olive Garden, of approximately 7,700 square feet, would be on the third level of the Central Atrium, in front of the Restaurant Land of Fire. Franklin Domenech, General Manager at the time of Plaza Las Américas, pointed out that "the most visible remodeling works of Plaza las Américas concluded last year with the restoration of the skylight of the north fountain and the north panoramic elevator, the facade of La Terraza and the connecting corridor between The Terrace and the third level of the Central Atrium, where Walgreens is. Now we are remodeling the elevators of La Torre de PLAZA and soon the remodeling of the area in front of Banco Santander and Red Lobster will begin," he concluded. Rafael Ruiz-Comas, Director of Corporate Leasing added that "this year the Tiffany and A'gaci stores have already opened and we expect more activity in new stores during the second half of 2016 to continue strengthening our commercial offer, starting with these four new stores that we are announcing today and that are owned by Puerto Rican businessmen and investors". Mr. Ruiz Comas also informed that in the hallway where Banco Santander was located, first level near the North fountain, a transformation would soon begin with the start of construction of the first Red Lobster in Puerto Rico, the construction of Starbucks and the expansion of the Playero store and the Pearle optician. Red Lobster would occupy approximately 8,000 square feet of space where the Banco Santander branch was previously located. Playero increased its space to occupy 2,500 square feet, including the corner where the Lugano Jewelry store used to be. Lugano, for its part, was relocated to the second level of the Central Atrium, in front of the Bose store. Pearle Vision would occupy a space of more than 3,000 square feet, between the Playero and Sears stores. During the construction of Playero and Pearle, both stores would continue to operate in temporary locations as opposed to their permanent spaces and the new stores were expected to be ready by the last quarter of this year. Red Lobster would begin construction in the third quarter of the year and it was expected to start operations in April 2017. Other changes that would be happening in the shopping center were the relocation of the Galería shoe store, which moved to the corridor between JCPenney and Macy's, in front of the Guess store, and the remodeling and expansion of Sizzler, in the La Terraza area.

On June 27, 2017, it would be reported that after 12 years in Plaza Las Américas, Brooks Brothers would close its boutique located in the central corridor of the shopping center, to receive a new tenant.

On February 22, 2018, taking over the 34,000 square foot space left by Sports Authority. A new Marshalls store would open at Plaza las Américas.

In September 2018, the mall celebrated its 50th anniversary.

On June 17, 2019, Empresas Fonalledas announced that Burlington would occupy the space left by the Toys 'R' Us toy store in Plaza Las Américas, and that the opening was planned for that fall season.

On December 25, 2019, it was announced that Cuba Libre Restaurant and Rum Bar will be constructed in the mall, originally set to open by January 2021, but due to economic loss caused by the COVID-19 pandemic, this project was delayed. In February 2021, despite delays, the chain stated that the restaurant would still be built; however, in June 2022, the project was ultimately canceled.

=== 2020–present ===
In March 2020, the mall closed until further notice due to the COVID-19 pandemic. Following the announcement of a new executive order on May 21, the mall reopened on June 1 with security measures, including new hours, mandatory face masks and social distancing. Reservations were now required to visit the mall and were originally limited to 2 people. On June 9, reservations were changed to allow up to 4 people. On July 1, it was announced that the reservations would no longer be required to visit the mall starting July 3, though face masks were still a mandatory requirement. The mask requirement were dropped in March 2022 following new government regulations.

On August 25, 2021, it would be reported that the Toys "R" Us chain said it would open its stores within the Macy's Department Store and that its flagship store would be at Plaza Las Américas.

On May 21, 2021, it would reported that both remaining Disney Stores on the island would close, which included the Plaza las Américas store. They were to close before June 16 of that year.

On November 8, 2021, it was reported that Macy's Backstage would be taking over the second floor of the former Borders and that it would be opening by November 20.

On August 17, 2022, Plaza Las Américas announced the opening of new stores, including the well known Colombian brand Vélez, specializing in handmade leather and fur items, and the clothing and accessories chain Windsor Fashion. During the month of September, the Arby's restaurant was expected to open in the La Terraza area. In addition, the reopening of Michael Kors was expected on the first level of the central atrium. For October it would be up to Windsor Fashion. The store would be located on the second level in front of the north fountain escalators, in a space of about 6,300 square feet.

On October 15, 2022, it was announced that the Kmart store, the last in Puerto Rico, would be closed by the end of that month.

On January 30, 2023, a 42,000 square foot Dave & Buster's would open at Plaza las Américas on the third level of the mall.

On May 8, 2023, the Red Lobster in Plaza Las Américas, the only restaurant of that chain that remained open in Puerto Rico, closed its doors for good, and was replaced by Longhorn Steakhouse in May 2024.

On June 15, 2023, Plaza Las Américas announced the arrival of new stores that have already opened or will be opening in time for the summer season, complementing the current offerings in fashion and gastronomy. Retailer Liage had already opened on the second level of Plaza Las Américas, next to T-Mobile and opposite the north fountain. Occupying approximately 900 square feet, Liage offers an exclusive selection of products for facial, skin and hair care for both women and men. Likewise, Cake by Glorimar, known for its cakes and sweets, had also arrived at Plaza Las Américas. The kiosk is located opposite Chico's on the shopping mall's first level and promises to delight visitors with its desserts and customized options. In early July, APM Monaco was set to open around 900 square feet of retail space next to Euromoda Sport on the mall's first level. At the end of July, Studio F, a Colombian fashion brand, was expected to open on the first level of the mall, adjacent to Modernica. Meanwhile, international fashion brand Zara has completed the expansion of its space at Plaza Las Américas on the first level, situated between Clark's and La Favorita stores. It now spans more than 34,000 square feet, combining the original Zara space with the area previously occupied by Gap. This 12,000 square-foot expansion would provide customers with a more diverse shopping experience, including Zara Kids and Zara Man, in addition to the women's section, Plaza Las Américas officials said. Moreover, Urban Beauty, which offers a selection of hair care products and tools, has relocated in front of the Carolina Herrera store on the second level, between JCPenney and Macy's. The new Urban Beauty space covers approximately 1,900 square feet. Lastly, in August, Preciosa would relocate to the second level to the approximately 1,600-square-foot space currently occupied by Mundo Mattress, to make way for the construction of Bimba y Lola, which would cover approximately 2,000 square feet. Bimba y Lola is a Spanish fashion brand that offers clothing and accessories for women. Meanwhile, Mundo Mattress will relocate to the second level into the space previously occupied by Beauty Factory, covering approximately 1,100 square feet. Also, La Patisserie de France would relocate in front of Soft & Creamy on the first level, occupying approximately 2,800 square feet.

In 2024, Chili's Grill & Bar would announce they would remodel their location at the mall.

On October 4, 2024, it was reported that the 50,000 square foot two-level Sears Brand Central & Home Improvement store in Plaza las Américas had closed. The store started its liquidation on the 1st of that month, by the 4th the store had closed, the rest of its merchandise being moved to the main Sears store at the mall. When asked which business would occupy the space, Plaza's general manager indicated that they had not yet made the decision, but indicated that they would evaluate several prospects and would announce it. “Some time ago, Sears and Plaza Las Américas began conversations in order to achieve this consolidation of spaces and, now that it has materialized, we have the opportunity to accelerate the evaluation of other alternatives that we have on the table,” added the general manager.

On February 14, 2025, it was reported that Forever 21 had begun the permanent closure of all its stores in Puerto Rico starting the liquidation process for all of the 4 stores on the island of which included the Plaza las Américas 2-level flagship store.

On July 9, 2025, it was announced that the Sears store at the mall would be closing by August of that year. The closure of the store paves the way for new commercial development opportunities for the mall. While nearly 100 employees faced layoffs, Plaza las Americás management was already evaluating options to transform the space and continue attracting investment, job creation, and consumer experiences adapted to new market trends. Edwin Tavárez, general manager of Plaza Las Américas, told El Vocero in a written statement that Sears had approached Plaza Las Américas management to discuss the transfer of the department store space. "Out of respect for the internal processes of our tenant of more than 40 years, we prefer that Sears be the one to express its opinion regarding the transfer and closure of its business," he said. “We are deeply saddened by this situation, primarily because of the impact it has on its customers and employees. However, the Sears store at Plaza Las Américas was one of the last remaining in operation in its entire chain, so we thank Sears for its patronage and efforts. From the Plaza's perspective, we are evaluating the best options for the future use of the space, ensuring it continues to grow, not only by offering alternative businesses and shopping experiences, but also by creating new jobs. We thank management and the entire Sears team for being an excellent member of the Plaza Las Américas retail community,” Tavárez emphasized.

On October 16, 2026, it was reported that H&M would be occupying the former site of Sears Brand Central, slated to open in 2027. It will be the company's fourth store in Puerto Rico.

== Gallery ==
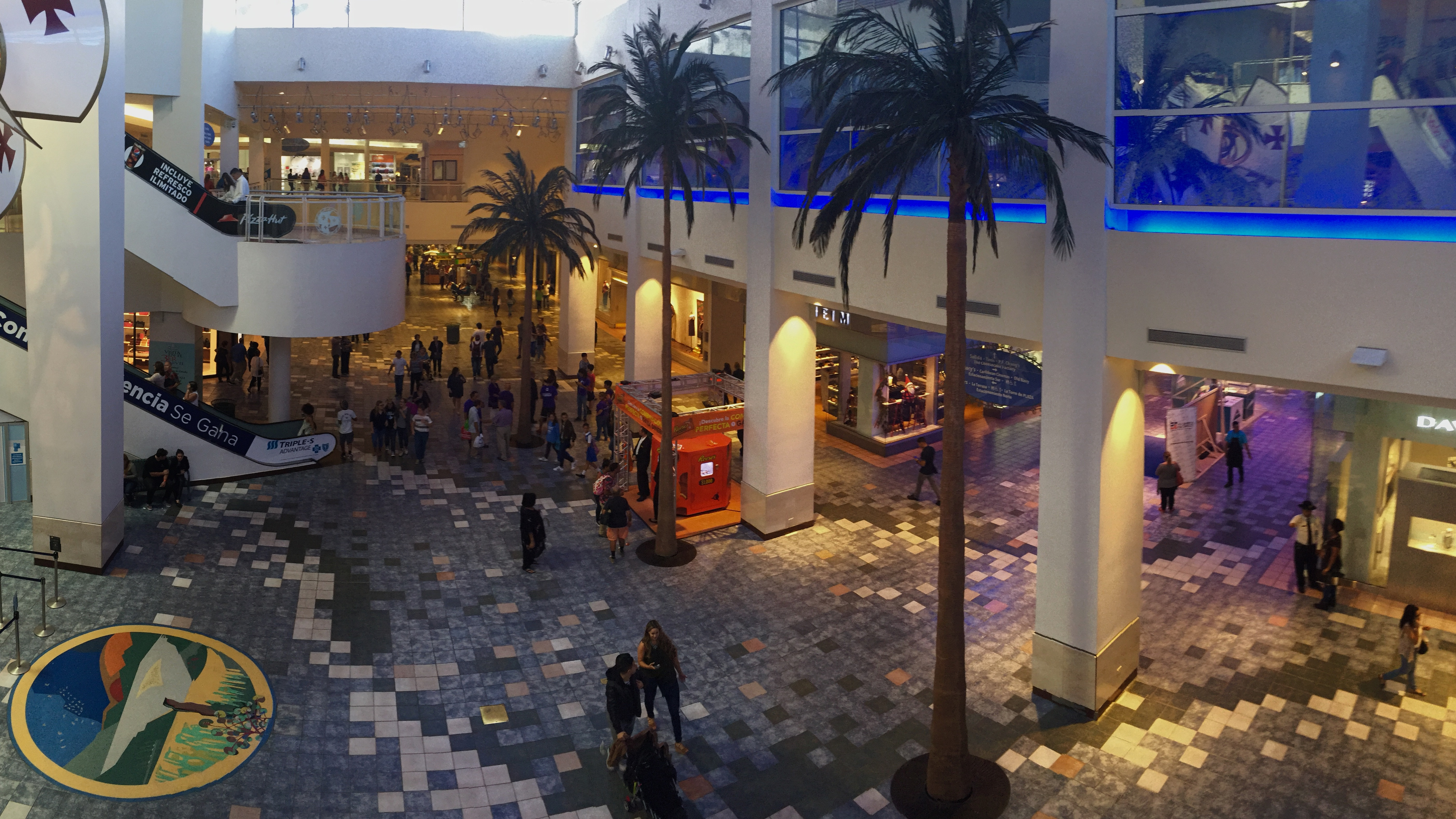
Main lobby

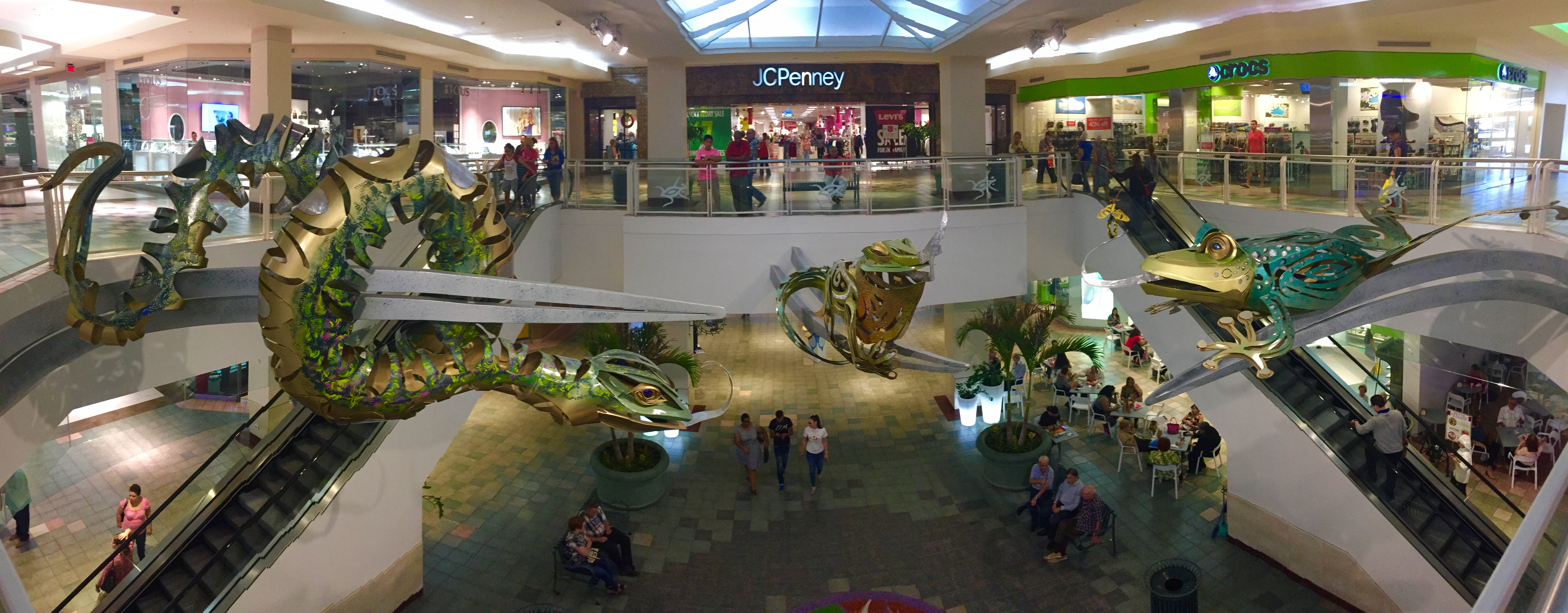
Sculptures near JCPenney entrance

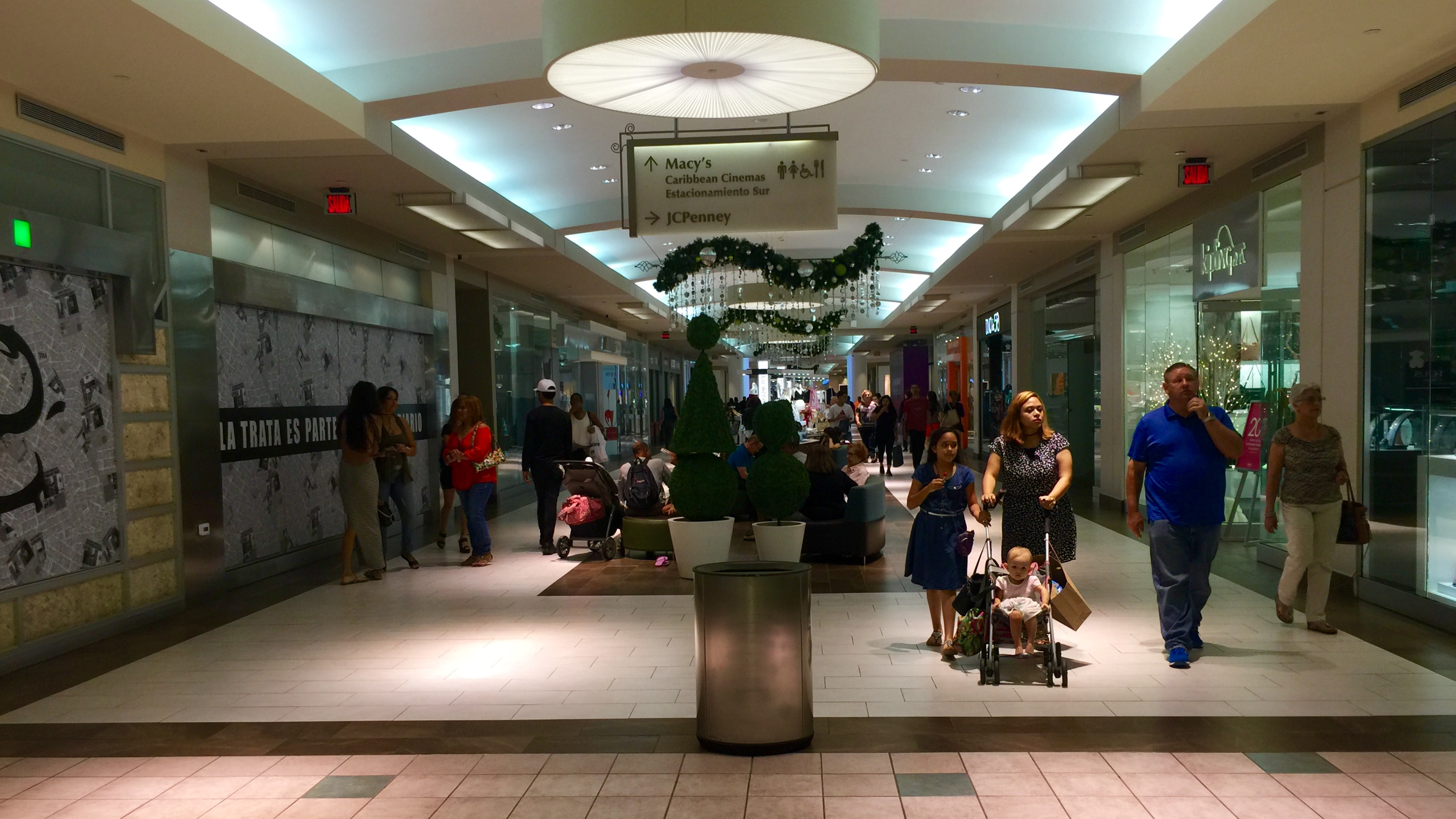
A hallway of the mall between JCPenney and Macy's

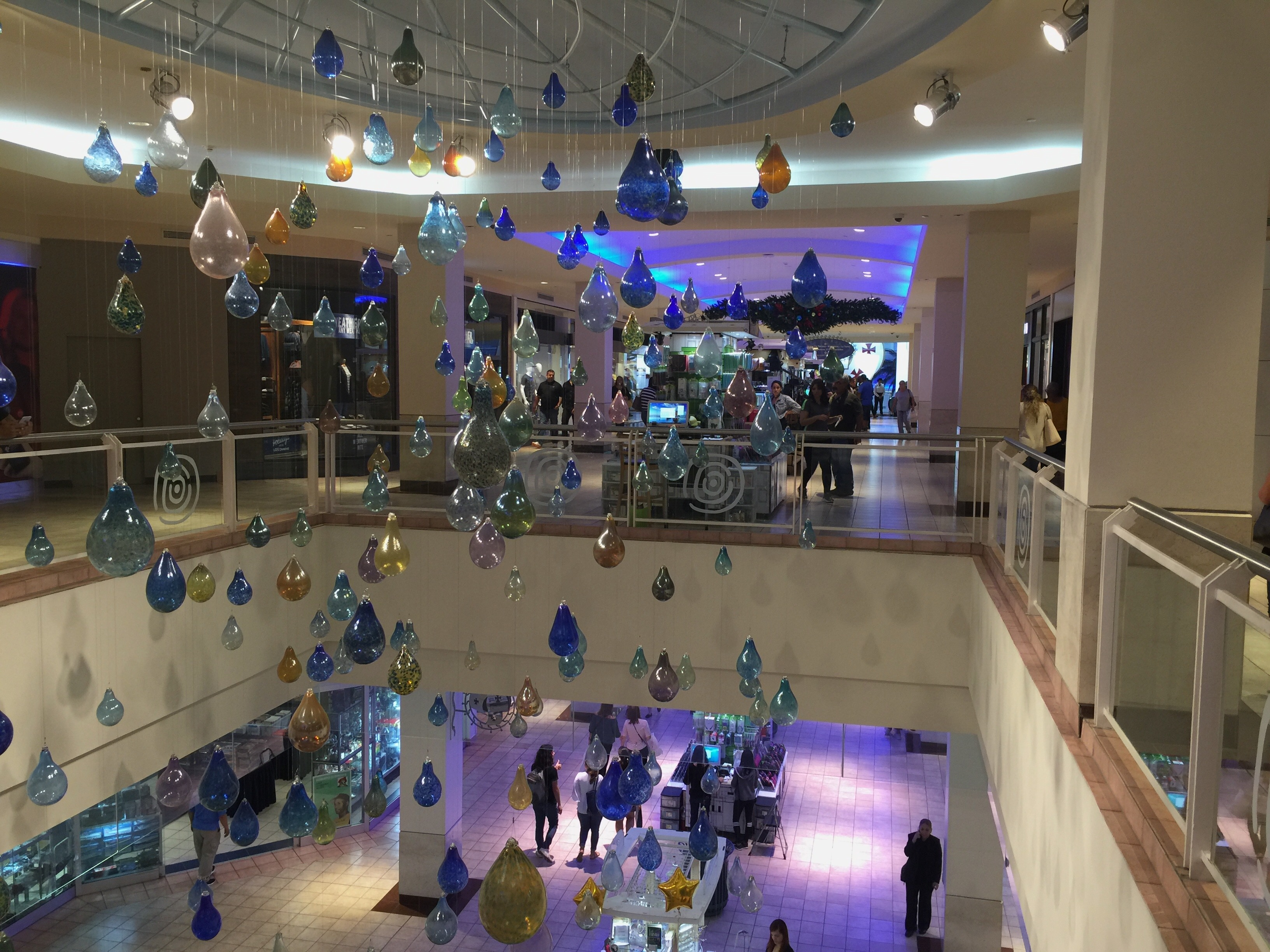
Blown glass artwork

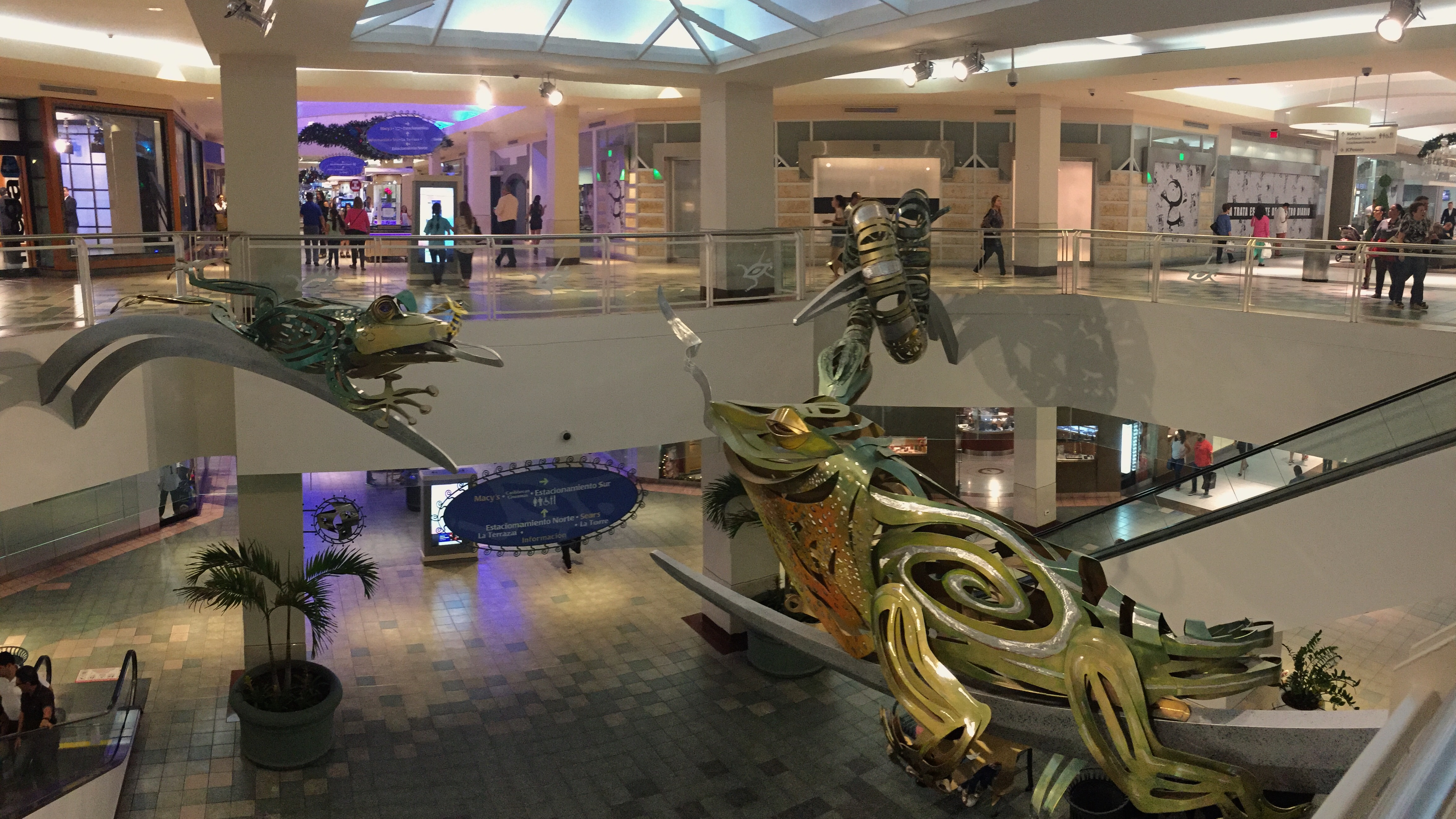
More metallic sculptures

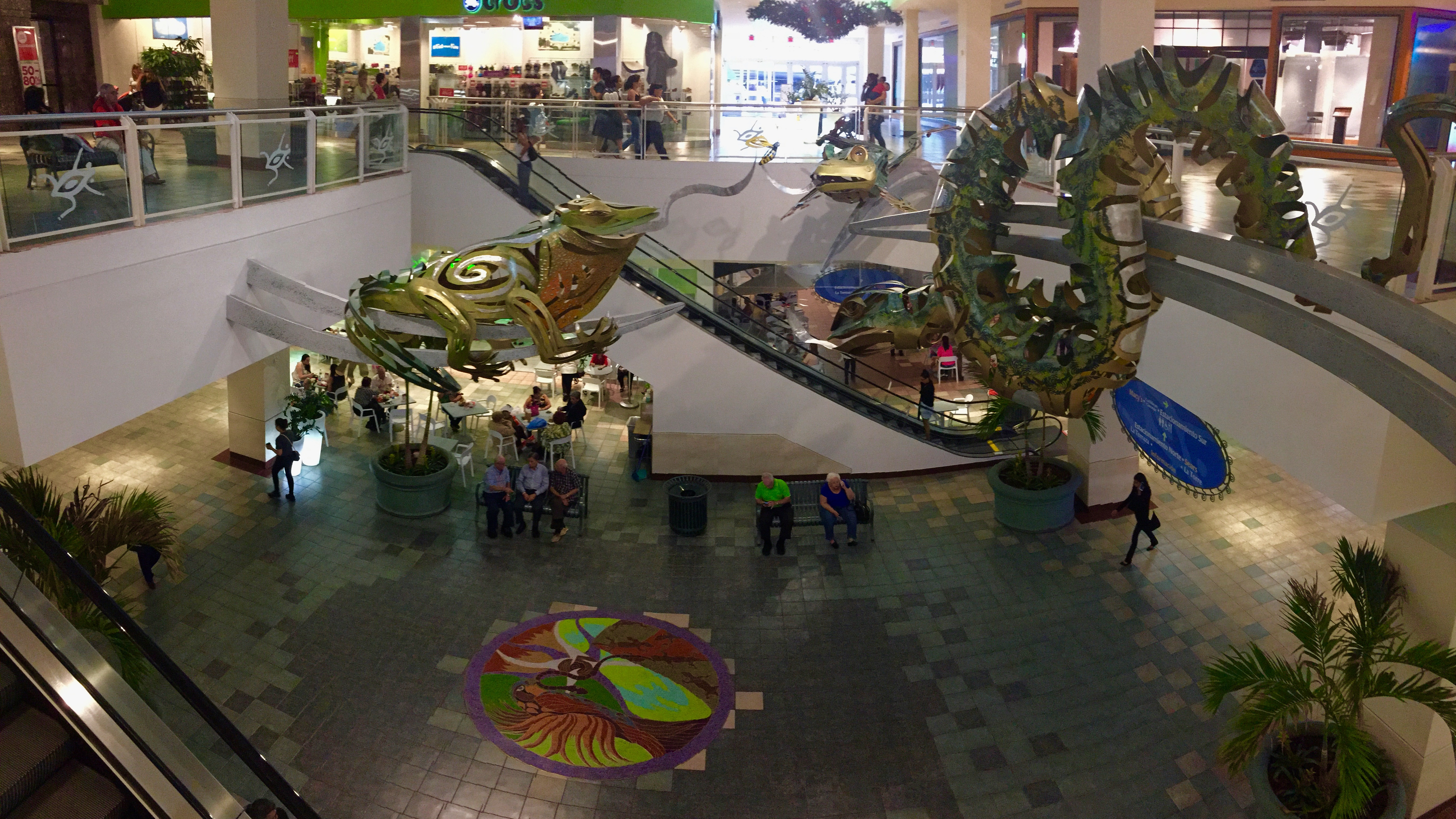

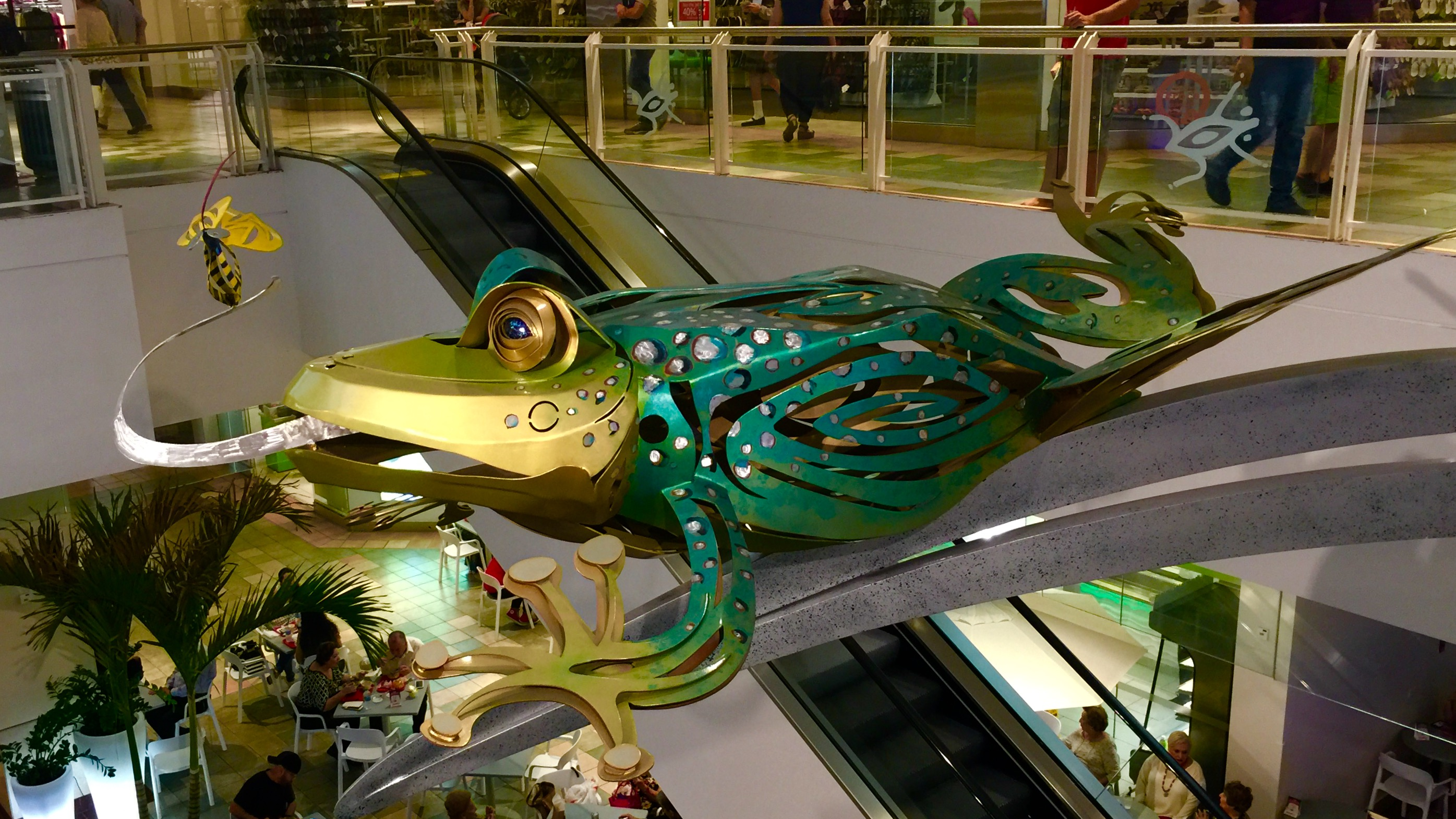

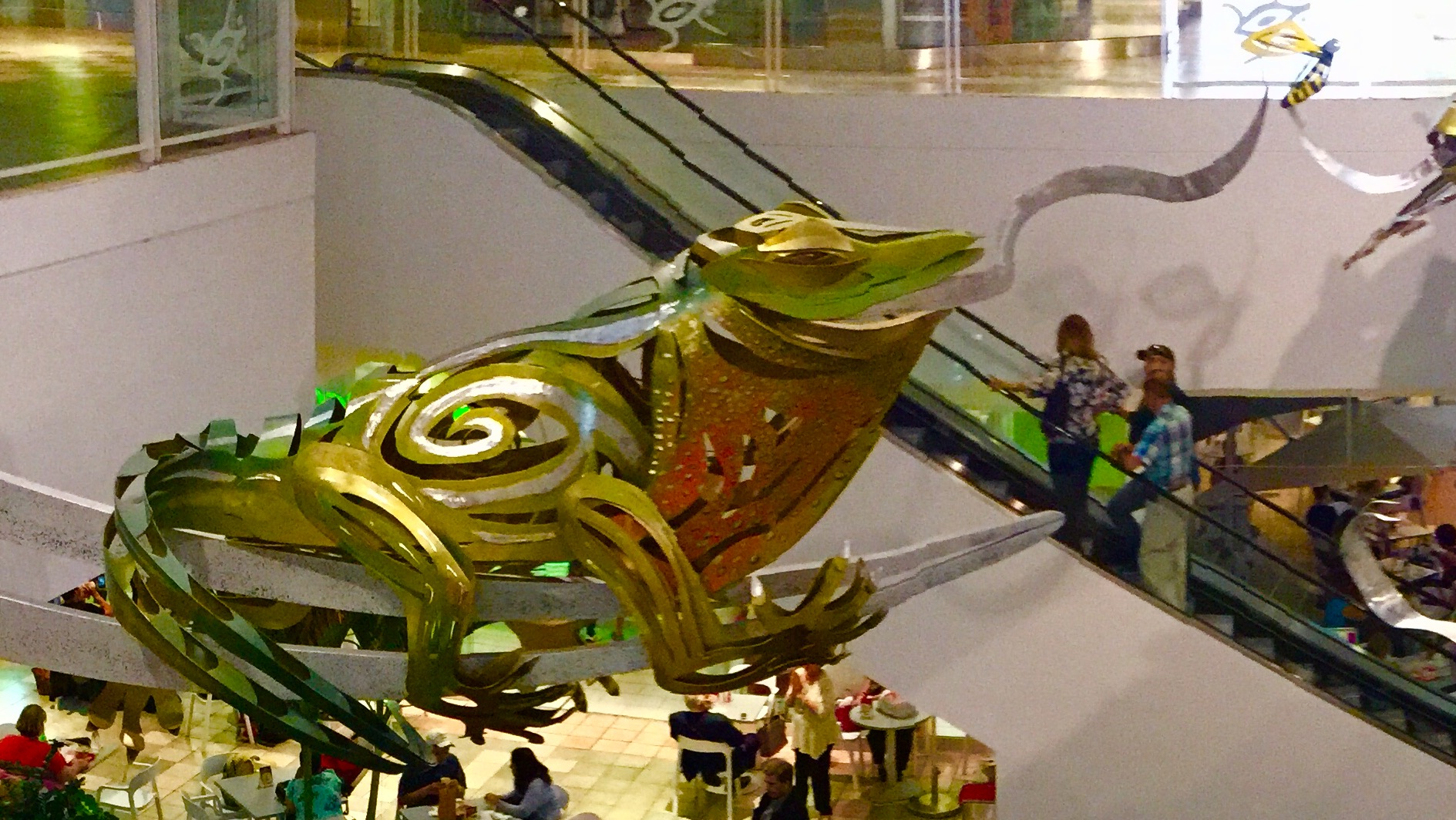

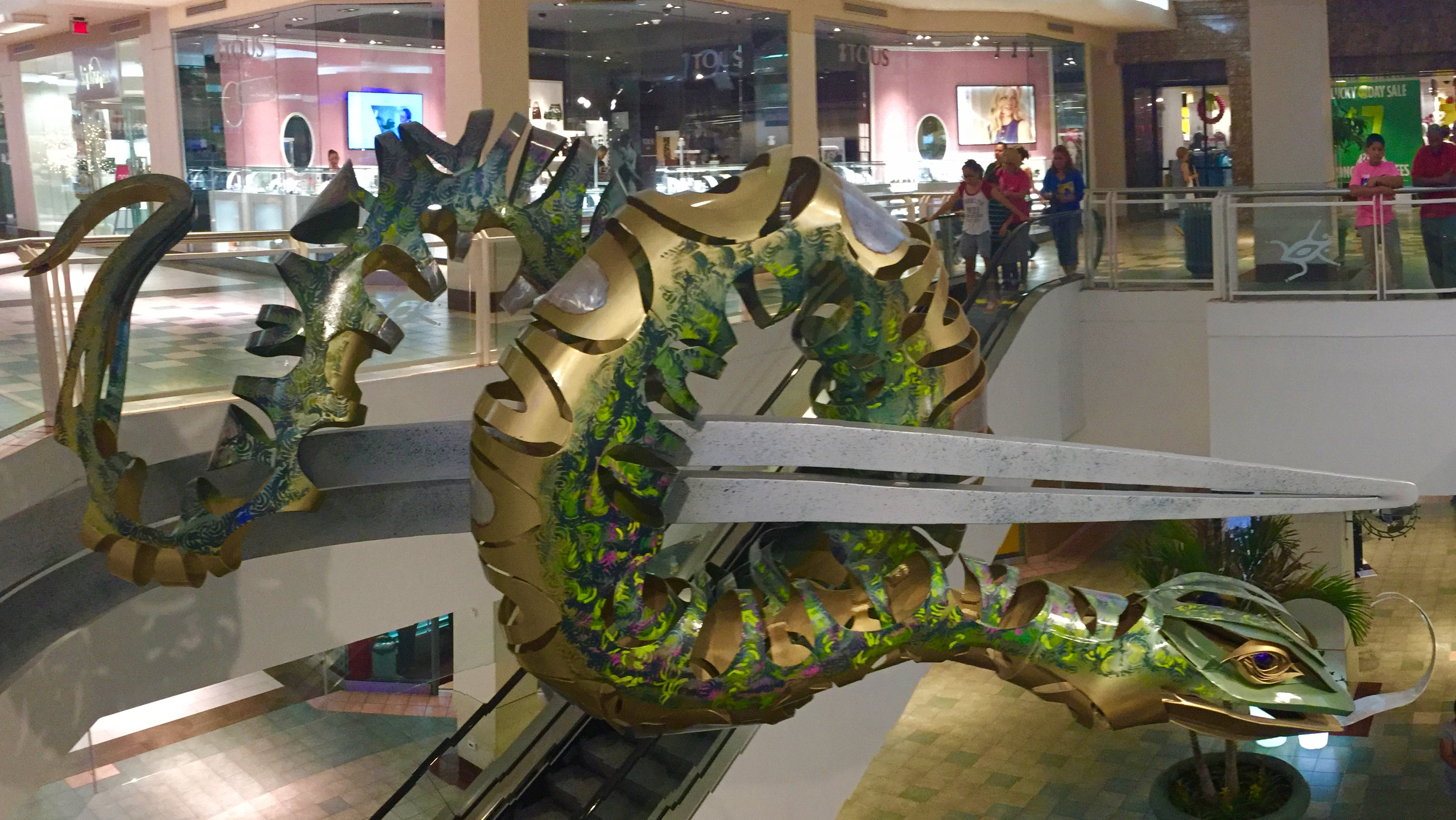

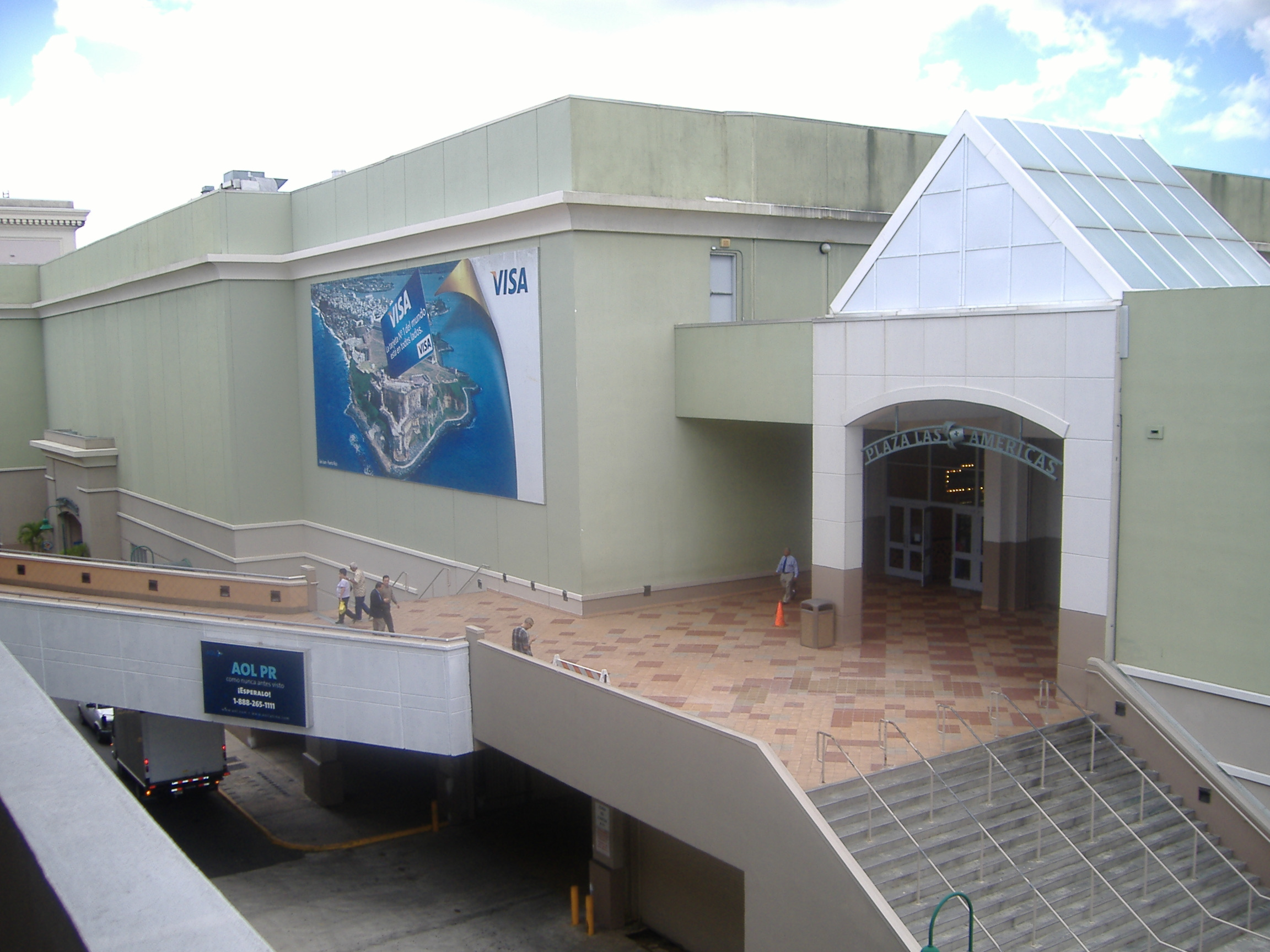
Caribbean Cinemas and mall entrance on second floor

== See also ==
- Jaime Fonalledas
- Plaza Carolina
- Plaza del Caribe
- The Mall of San Juan
- Plaza del Carmen Mall
- Las Catalinas Mall
- Plaza Rio Hondo
- San Patricio Plaza
- Mayaguez Mall
- The Outlets at Montehiedra
- Plaza del Norte
- Plaza del Sol
