= Suiza Dairy =

Puerto Rican milk brand (established in 1942)

Suiza Dairy is a Puerto Rican milk products brand. Its general manager, as of October 2023, is Pablo Fernando Vallejo Ruiz. Their major competitors in the island are Tres Monjitas Dairy. The company also produces juice, fruit drinks, and other lactose products.

== History ==
Suiza Dairy was established in 1942. In 2018, the company opened a plant in the northwestern Puerto Rican city of Aguadilla, for $40,000,000 (40 million) United States dollars (USD) . This plant is expected to make the brand $8,000,000 USD per year between 2018 and 2038, thus bringing in a gross profit of about $120,000,000 USD by the end of that period. On June 28, 2024, the company partially closed its operations and laid off 483 employees.

== Lawsuits ==
The company and its rivals Tres Monjitas have been involved in litigations. On July 4, 2004, the companies filed a related case against Luis Rivera Cubano, then Puerto Rico's Secretary of Agriculture, and Juan R. Pedro Giordan, the Administrator of the Office of Milk Industry Regulatory Administration of Puerto Rico.

In late 2009, they were also co-appellees in another case.

In 2014, they both filed a suit against Myrna Comas Pagan, who, like Luis Rivera Cubano before, was then the Secretary of Agriculture of Puerto Rico.
