= Jaime Fonalledas =

Puerto Rican businessman (born 1946)

- Born: 1946 (age 79–80); San Juan, Puerto Rico
- Education: Interamerican University, San Germán (BA); University of Puerto Rico School of Law (JD)
- Political party: Republican
- Spouse: Zori Fonalledas

Jaime Fonalledas (born 1946) is a Puerto Rican businessman who is the current president and CEO of Empresas Fonalledas Inc., which owns Plaza Las Américas, the largest shopping mall in the Caribbean. Empresas Fonalledas Inc., also has holdings in dairy cattle operations, milk processing plants, non-dairy food industries, plastics manufacturing, real estate ventures, and banking operations. Employing more than 9,000 people in total, Empresas Fonalledas companies include Plaza del Caribe, Tres Monjitas, Vaqueria Tres Monjitas, Ganaderia Tres Monjitas, Baristas del Caribe -local operators of Starbucks Puerto Rico- and franchise Soft & Creamy.

== Early years ==
Fonalledas was born in San Juan, Puerto Rico into one of the island's wealthiest families. There he received his early education at Catholic schools in Hato Rey and Rio Piedras. In 1966, he graduated magna cum laude from the Interamerican University of Puerto Rico and earned a degree in economics. Fonalledas pursued his J.D. degree at the University of Puerto Rico School of Law and was admitted to the Puerto Rico Bar in 1971. He joined his family's business enterprises "Empresas Fonalledas", a business which has its origins in the early part of the 20th century.

== Beginning of the Fonalledas dynasty ==
Fonalledas' grandfather, Jaime Fonalledas Córdova, had a farm called "Santa Elena", located in the town of Toa Baja. There he had a small store and sold milk and dairy products from his farm. On July 21, 1918, Fonalledas Córdova, together with his two brothers Jerónimo and Gerardo and his sister Rosa, bought 527 acres (2 square kilometers) of land in Hato Rey, a section of San Juan, which was part of a farm called "Las Monjas" and where sugar cane was cultivated.

The family began their milk and dairy producing operations and named their enterprise "Vaqueria Tres Monjitas". The quality of their product made them leaders in their agricultural field. What began as a small business has evolved into Empresas Fonalledas, one of Puerto Rico's largest business enterprises which include Plaza Del Caribe in Ponce, Puerto Rico; as well as Vaqueria Tres Monjitas which produces milk, dairy products, juice drinks; an ice cream companies, several real estate developments and Plaza Las Americas.

== Empresas Fonalledas Inc. ==
=== Plaza Las Americas ===
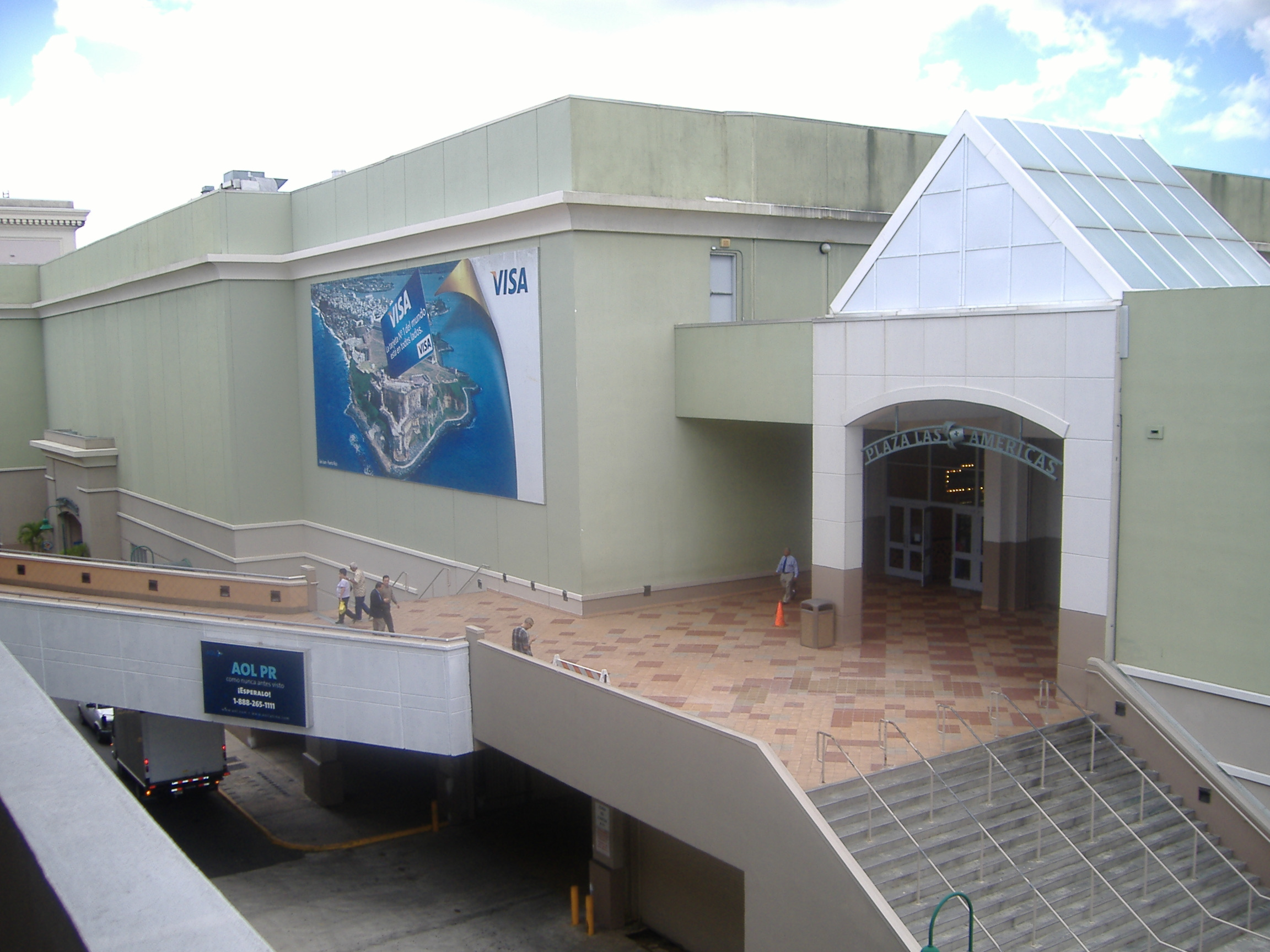
One of the multiple entrances to Plaza Las Americas

Fonalledas was still a child in the late 1950s when the family thought of the idea of developing a shopping center, modeled after Lenox Square in Atlanta and spurred on by the evolution of the concept in the United States. Construction began on the same sugar cane fields on which the Fonalledas family had established their dairy business and Plaza Las Americas was inaugurated in 1968, boasting the first JC Penney store outside the continental United States.

Fonalledas eventually rose to the presidency of the family business. Under his leadership Plaza Las Americas has become the largest shopping center in the Caribbean. The center has often been used as a testing ground for U.S. retailers looking to expand internationally. Macy’s opened their first store outside the continental United States, Borders opened its first bilingual store and a 13-screen movie theater was opened for a total of 21 movie screens. The sales figures place Plaza Las Americas among the top 1% of super-regional shopping centers in North America.

=== Vaqueria Tres Monjitas ===
Under Fonalledas' leadership Vaqueria Tres Monjitas has become the largest milk and dairy industry in Puerto Rico. The company, with over 450 employees and annual sales of $110 million (U.S.), relocated its operations to an area in the town of Dorado, into a modern plant that boasts a modern quality control laboratory. The company, which also produces fruit juices and drinks, has three warehouse and distribution centers located in the cities of Ponce, Arecibo and Mayagüez.

=== Real Estate development ===
Empresas Fonalledas invested millions of dollars in various real estate projects. The construction of an office tower, Torre Chardon, began in 1998 and was finished in 2001. Fonalledas also oversaw the development of two residential projects in San Juan and Ponce respectively as part of the real estate holdings of Empresas Fonalledas.

The San Juan project includes two residential buildings with 58 apartments located in Hato Rey and the Ponce residential project features 132 walk-up units with direct access to Plaza Del Caribe.

== Awards and honours ==
In 2000, Fonalledas was named "Puerto Rico Chamber of Commerce Businessman of the Year". He has also been recognized as one of the Caribbean Business Top Business Leaders of Puerto Rico. In 2003, Fonalledas donated 500 thousand dollars to the scholarship funds of the University of Puerto Rico.

Fonalledas, who has been honored by universities, professional associations, and the Roman Catholic Church is married to the former Zoraida Ferraiuoli-Martinez, the Republican National Committeewoman for Puerto Rico, who was a Superdelegate to the 2000 Republican National Convention in Philadelphia and an important Statehood advocate for the island. Mrs. Fonalledas received her Juris Doctor Degree from the InterAmerican University School of Law of Puerto Rico and her LLM in Labor Law from the New York University School of Law. She was reelected National Committeewoman for Puerto Rico at the State Convention held on November 23, 2003. She has held this position since 1995. The Fonalledas have four children.

== See also ==
- List of Puerto Ricans
- Plaza Las Americas
