= Plaza del Caribe =

Shopping mall in Ponce, Puerto Rico

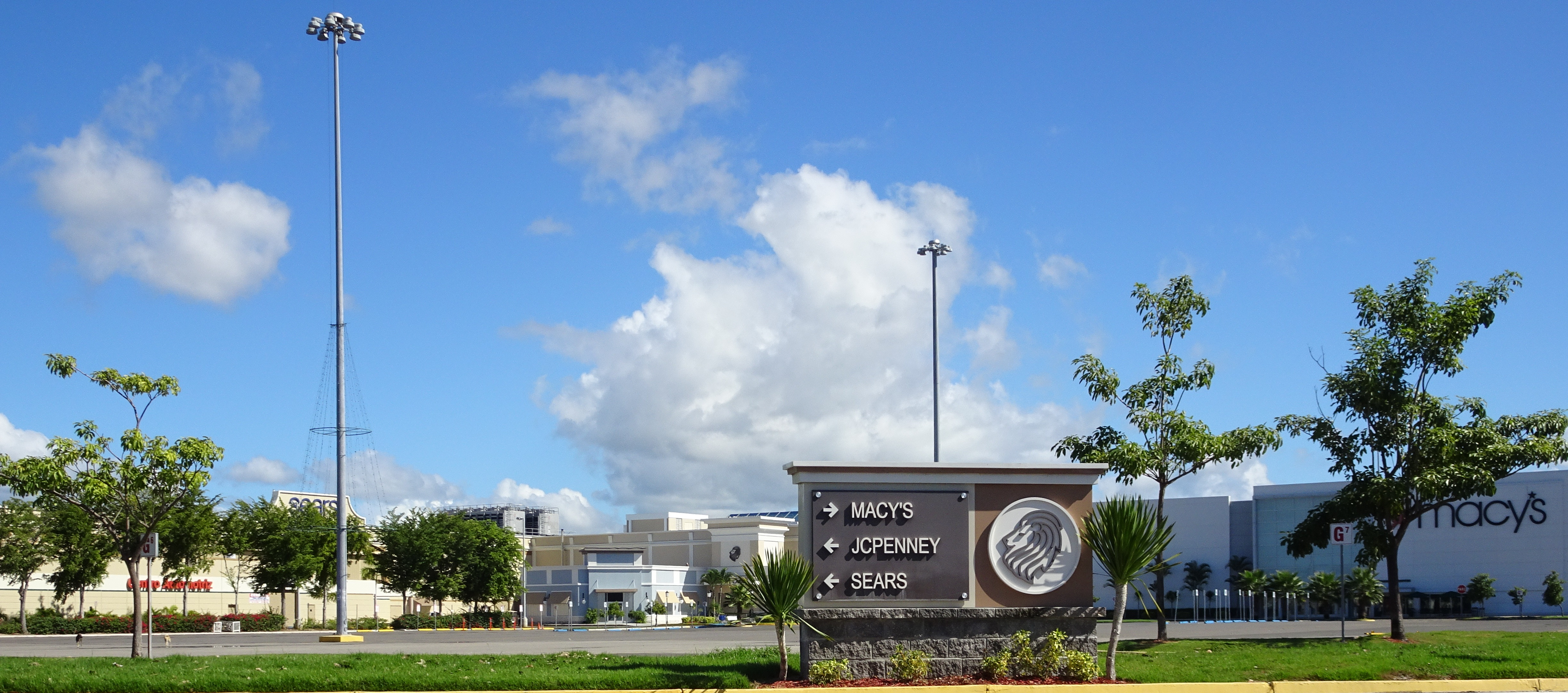
- Plaza del Caribe Mall, looking north
- Location: Ponce, Puerto Rico
- Coordinates: 17°59′36.35″N 66°36′41.65″W
- Address: PR-2 (Ponce By-pass) and PR-12 (Ave. Santiago de los Caballeros)
- Opened: 9 November 1992
- Developer: Q.B. Construction
- Manager: Ing. Edwin Tavárez
- Owner: Jaime Fonalledas, Empresas Fonalledas, Inc.
- Architect: JP2 Architects, LCC (Baltimore, Md)
- Num. of stores: 140
- Num. of anchor tenants: 6 (5 open, 1 vacant)
- Floor area: 1,100,000 sq ft (100,000 m^{2})
- Floors: 2
- Parking: 4,000
- Website: http://www.plazadelcaribe.com

Plaza del Caribe is an enclosed shopping mall located in Ponce, Puerto Rico. It is owned by Empresas Fonalledas, and is the largest mall in southern Puerto Rico. The mall is located at the intersection of Puerto Rico Highway 2 and Highway 12. The anchor stores are JCPenney, Burlington Coat Factory, and Macy's. A former third anchor store, Sears, closed in February 2020.

== History ==
=== Early development: 1960s-1970s ===
On 28 December 1969, the Kislak Organization advertised the development of a new 600,000 square feet (56,000 m^{2}) regional enclosed mall named "Plaza del Caribe" in Ponce.

On 6 November 1971, JCPenney, one of America's largest retail chains at the time, was to open its second major department store in Puerto Rico by November 1973. The J. I. Kislak Realty Corp. of Newark, New Jersey, and San Juan, had announced that negotiations had been concluded for a two-story,174,400-square-foot (16,200 m^{2}) department store to be built for Penney's occupancy in Plaza Del Caribe, a regional shopping center that was rising on a 62-acre (25 ha) tract on Exterior Avenue in Ponce. Plaza Del Caribe, an enclosed, all-weather mall complex was scheduled to comprise more than 500,000 square feet of stores with parking provided for 3,600 cars in its initial stage. Provisions were being made for expansion, and the center was expected to reach 725,000 square feet of stores in its final stage. The center was being developed by Sabari Estates, Inc., headed by Jose Sauri Jr. of Ponce. Architects for the project were Passalacqua & Cia. Development consultant and exclusive leasing broker for Plaza Del Caribe was the J. I. Kislak Realty Corp. which maintained a Caribbean regional office in San Juan. The same broker was an exclusive leasing agent for the Plaza Las Américas in San Juan, the first regional shopping center in Latin America.

On 21 May 1972, it was reported that construction of the shopping center would begin work on 1 July of that year. The center was expected to have 680,000 square feet and 60 stores at the time, with a completion date set for 1974.

On 25 June 1975, it was announced that Plaza del Caribe, projected to cost $25 million, would begin construction in Ponce next September that year. This was reported by the firms Sabari Estates and Kislak Realty Corporation, developer and broker of the project, respectively. Final approval for the channeling of the Río Portugués, which served as the border for the new shopping center, had been granted by the Department of Transportation and Public Works and by the Army Corps of Engineers, which, according to the firms, paved the way at the time for the start of construction of the project. The Kislak organization reported that it had already signed lease agreements with Pueblo Supermarkets, JCPenney, F.W. Woolworth, Gordon's Jewelers, González Padín, Thom McAn and Kinney Shoes stores, which would occupy premises in the shopping center. Kislak Realty president Joseph Aramanda said Plaza del Caribe was expected to provide 2,000 jobs when completed.

On 15 April 1976, it was reported that Plaza del Caribe Shopping Center was about to begin construction. An executive with J.I. Kislak Realty Corp., the exclusive leasing agents at the time for Plaza del Caribe, said the mall would have approximately 85 stores. Located on the Ponce highway, Plaza del Caribe would have nearly 700,000 square feet (65,000 m^{2}) of commercial space and service areas. It was to be located on about 65 acres of land. The developer of the Shopping Center was Sabari Estates, from Ponce, whose president was Dr. Francisco Sánchez Arán. Atilio Zepeda, from the Kislak Realty Corporation for the Caribbean, said that among the most important department stores that had signed a lease for the mall was JCPenney. "This will be the largest mall ever built outside of the San Juan area, and we expect to have a large number of major department stores as well as other well known stores when Plaza del Caribe opens. We are currently signing new tenants," Zepeda said.

=== Opening and success: 1990s-2000s ===
On 30 June 1990, it was reported that one of the most modern and complete shopping centers in the southern area of the Island, would serve more than 470,000 consumers in the municipalities of the region. The project was under construction on a 70-acre property on highway number 2 in Ponce and represented an investment of over $50 million. "The city of Ponce is now experiencing a renewed effervescence. We feel very proud to share in their enthusiasm and to contribute, through Plaza del Caribe, to the economic development of Ponce, as well as the entire southern area," said Jaime Fonalledas, son, president of the Board of the center. Fonalledas added that even with two years to go before the opening of the center, there was already a palpable interest on the part of the business community. He reported that preliminary agreements had been reached with the main department store chains for their participation in Plaza del Caribe. The businessman also highlighted that considerations have been taken in the architectural design of the center so that it contributed to the cultural richness of Ponce and complemented the city's tourist offerings.

On 9 November 1992, Plaza del Caribe, opened its doors to the public, and was already in the process of starting a third phase of construction. It was not disclosed what types of stores or businesses would be located in the three planned buildings, the largest of which would be 400,870 square feet. The remaining two would be 60,000 and 44,000 square feet, respectively. The projected cost of the new investment in Plaza del Caribe was also unclear. The two initial phases, the first of which began in April 1989, required an investment of $74 million. At the time, 1,500 to 2,000 jobs had been created. The three buildings would be built under the concept of a "power center". Something similar to this type of concept was the Toys "R" Us store in Plaza Las Américas at the time. Plaza del Caribe, whose main tenants were Sears, JCPenney and González Padín, opened to the public with 32 stores already ready, representing 66 percent of stores or 84 percent of leased space. It was expected that by December of that year, 87 percent of them would be open, which meant that 90 percent of the space would already be rented. In total, Plaza del Caribe would have 118 stores, including the three main anchor stores, food outlets, movie theaters and stores such as Kinney Shoes, Oak Tree, Foot Locker and LensCrafters. This mix of establishments was made to follow the tastes of consumers who preferred clothing and shoe stores. They were followed in importance by service establishments; entertainment, music, and home goods stores; and then those of gifts and jewelry.

In July 2003, Plaza del Caribe would have establishments such as Gap, Old Navy, Tiendas Capri, 5-7-9, Claire's, Champs Sports, Foot Locker, KB Toys, Electronics Boutique, Radio Shack, Rave, Naturalizer, Regis Hairstylists, Time Out, Zales Jewelers, and others.

On 6 January 2007, It was reported that Circuit City would be opening a store in Plaza del Caribe. The approximately 20,000 square foot store was expected to open by 2008. It closed in 2009 after the company declared bankruptcy.

=== 2010-present ===
During the 2010 Christmas holiday season, the in-mall 6-screen cinema was replaced by a new 10-screen Caribbean Cinemas multiplex located on mall property but physically detached from the main mall structure. It is located immediately south of the main mall complex bounded by Autopista Luis A. Ferre (PR-52).

On 15 April 2012, CompUSA announced the grand opening of its second branch in Puerto Rico. The 30,000 square foot store incorporated a total consumer shopping experience through its "Retail 2.0" system. This system combined the best of shopping through traditional stores and online. A grand opening ceremony would be held on 27 April 2012. The store under the nameplate at the time of TigerDirect would close by 30 June 2015.

On 20 July 2012, it was announced that Plaza del Caribe would soon begin a $3.5 million remodeling and expansion of its Terraza del Caribe food court and the construction of the second Zara store in Puerto Rico. The Zara store would be located in the space previously occupied by the original location of Caribbean Cinemas, and was expected to open at the end of that year. Upon completion, the food court would have some 10,500 square feet of new space and its new design would be "modern, bright, with open spaces, and will feature spaces for larger groups of people and counter tables, in addition to the traditional food court tables," mall officials said. "This year, when we celebrate the 20th anniversary of Plaza Del Caribe, we begin our preparations for the next 20 years of commitment and service to the market that has welcomed and supported us," said Arturo Valldejuly, general manager at the time of Plaza Del Caribe. "We now start the complete renovation and expansion of the food court, where we will be changing the floor, acoustic ceilings, furniture, facades of the eateries and the lighting of the area," said Valldejuly, adding that although the construction work would begin then, it would be coordinated in a way that did not disrupt the everyday operation of the shopping center. It was expected that the project would be completed during the first half of that following year. Part of the food court project included relocating the mall's emblematic "Venus" sculpture from the base of the central atrium stairs. where it had been located for two decades at the time to the center of the food court.

On 13 May 2013, a P.F. Chang's China Bistro restaurant would open at the mall, the 7,400 square foot structure had a capacity for 268 patrons.

On 31 May 2013, twelve years after making its local debut, retailer Macy's, announced planned to open a new store in Ponce, in the fall of 2015. The two-level, 150,000 square-foot store would be located in Plaza del Caribe, owned by Empresas Fonalledas. Macy's Ponce store would include an assortment of fashion goods for women, men, children and home that would be "tailored to the preferences of the Puerto Rican customer," store officials said. Construction was expected to begin in 2014. Macy's store was expected to employ a workforce of approximately 275 associates. The investment required to build the new store was not revealed.

In fall 2013, a LongHorn Steakhouse opened at the mall.

In October 2013, Sports Authority, one of the largest sporting goods retailers at the time in the mainland, marked its entrance into the Puerto Rican market with the grand opening of its flagship store in Ponce. The sporting goods store, located in Plaza del Caribe, boasted 35,000 square feet of retail space and featured a wide assortment of quality sporting goods. The store would be announced to close in 2016 due to the bankruptcy of the chain.

On 24 January 2014, it was announced that after more than 20 years of being founded, the Plaza del Caribe shopping center, in Ponce, would be carrying out its first expansion, in which it would add a two-story building and more than 200,000 square feet of commercial space, at a cost of more than $30 million. The expansion, had not gone without controversy due to the removal of more than 300 trees on the land where the buildings will be built. The mall would have Macy's as its new anchor. This would be the second store that the chain would open on the island, the first one had opened in the year 2000 in Plaza Las Américas. In an exclusive interview with Jaime Fonalledas, owner of Plaza del Caribe, he indicated that the construction would start during the third quarter of this year, and was expected to be completed by the end of 2015. It would be carried out in the southern area of the mall, in front of where the Sports Authority and CompUSA stores were. The expansion would consist of a new two-story, 57,000 square foot building, connecting the existing mall building with the new Macy's anchor store. This addition would be made on the south side, next to Banco Popular on the first level and Loft on the second. Said building would accommodate a total of between 15 and 18 commercial establishments, and on its roof it would feature a large skylight that would allow sunlight to enter and give the two levels a lot of clarity. The Macy's store would have two levels and 150,000 square feet. With the expansion, more than 400 additional parking spaces would be built. "Plaza del Caribe has been successful from day one. Macy's was interested in opening a second store in Puerto Rico, and many merchants have confidence in the trajectory of this mall. Imagine, without announcing much, new tenants have arrived," Fonalledas commented when asked why he decided to expand the shopping center at this time. Among those tenants who had opted for Plaza del Caribe, he mentioned Sports Authority, Zara, Forever 21, Express, PF Chang's, Longhorn, and Pandora, in addition to Macy's.

On 22 October 2015, it was reported that Plaza del Caribe had been the subject of a significant overhaul that included the construction of a new building featuring Puerto Rico's second ever Macy's department store, being scheduled to open on 5 November of that year. The expansion project, which entailed an investment of around $40 million also added about 60,000 square feet of space to the original mall structure, which in turn allowed the inclusion of about 18 new stores to the Ponce shopping center. Some of the retail tenants that had recently opened or were slated to open during those next few weeks included Victoria's Secret, Bath & Body Works, House of Hoops by Foot Locker and Starbucks. The expansion project at the mall, which had begun its most intense stage two years earlier, also involved constructing a structure connecting the Macy's building to the rest of the mall, as well as replacing the mall's floor and roof elements, furniture and décor.The shopping center's redesigned look resembled that of certain areas of Plaza Las Américas, particularly the hallways between anchor stores Macy's and JC Penney.

On 5 November 2015, the mall would officially inaugurate its new renovations, which also included the opening of the Macy's store.

On 7 November 2019, it was announced that Sears would be closing this location a part of a plan to close 96 stores nationwide. The store would close by February 2020.

In Q2 2025, Burlington Coat Factory is scheduled to open a department store in the former Sears Brand Central store.

== Mall design ==
Plaza del Caribe is notable for its sophisticated design, featuring artwork scattered throughout the mall, especially in its central atrium. Exterior entrances provide access to both its first and second floors.

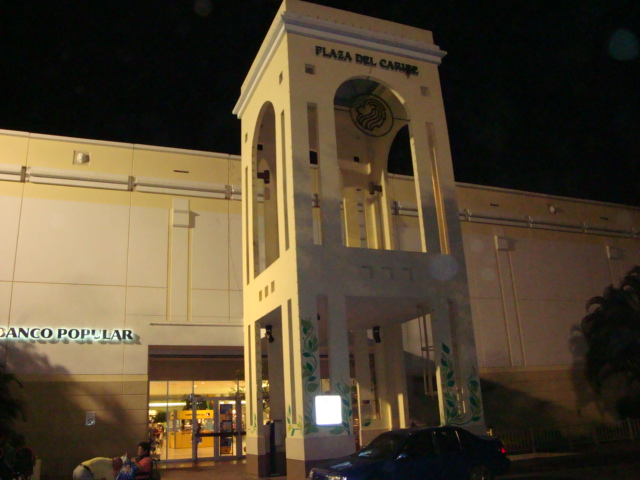
One of Plaza del Caribe's entrances at nighttime

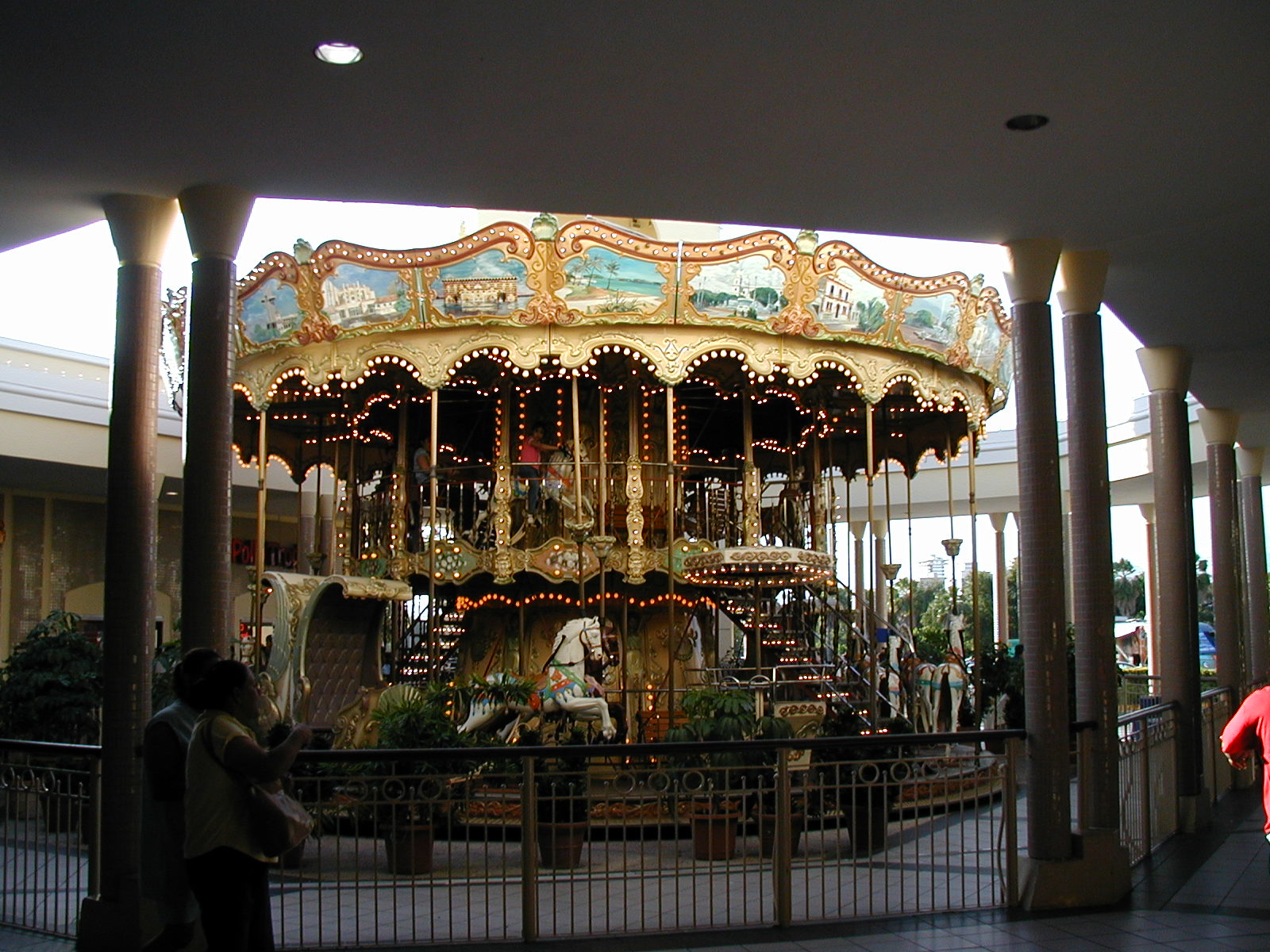
Carousel at Plaza del Caribe

== See also ==
- Jaime Fonalledas
- Plaza Las Americas
