= Tres Monjitas =

Puerto Rican milk and dairy products brand

Tres Monjitas is a Puerto Rican dairy brand. The brand, along with competitor Suiza Dairy, is one of Puerto Rico's two leading milk and dairy products brands. Its CEO is Jaime Fonalledas, whose grandfather, Jaime Fonalledas Córdova, was one of the four siblings that helped establish the brand.

== History ==
The Tres Monjitas milk brand was introduced to the Puerto Rican market on June 29, 1918 (although some sources suggest it was July 21, 1918). The brand was established by the wealthy Fonalledas family, who own the largest mall in the Caribbean and the second largest in Latin America, the Plaza Las Americas mall. The Fonalledas siblings (Jerónimo, Gerardo, Jaime, and Rosita), purchased land from Don Pablo Ubarri Capetillo, who held the title of Count of San José de Santurce, in an area known as "Las Monjas" ("The Nuns"), in Hato Rey.

In 1938, Tres Monjitas began a home milk delivery system, with which clients received milk directly to their homes. By 1941, the brand inaugurated a pasteurizing plant and by 1942, Tres Monjitas was selling pasteurized milk to the general population.

In 1950, the company established the "Vaqueria Tres Monjitas", to help with the production of their milk and other dairy products.

The Fonalledas family, considering the growth experienced by the San Juan metro area, started thinking about opening a shopping center, and so in 1967, construction of the Plaza Las Americas mall began on what was the original "Tres Monjitas" company's terrain. Since then, the company has opened manufacturing plants in San Juan as well as distribution centers in the southern Puerto Rico city of Ponce and in the northern Puerto Rico city of Arecibo as well as in the western Puerto Rico city of Mayagüez. The brand has been selling milk in Mayagüez and the Western area of Puerto Rico since 1982.

The Mayagüez plant opened in 2019.

=== Lawsuits ===
Through its history, Tres Monjitas has been involved in various lawsuits.

During 2004, Tres Monjitas and main competitor Suiza Dairy filed a joint lawsuit against then Secretary of Agriculture Luis Rivera Cubano and against Juan Pedro Giordan, who, at the time, was the administrator of the Office of the Milk Industry's Regulatory Administration.

A second joint lawsuit, Tres Monjitas and Suiza Dairy versus Irizarry, took place during 2009.

And, in 2014, Tres Monjitas and Suiza Dairy again filed a joint lawsuit, this time against Myrna Comas Pagan, Puerto Rico's secretary of the Department of Agriculture. An agreement was reached in which the Puerto Rican government would contribute funds to both milk brands as part of an accrual mechanism designed to allow the processors to recoup a fair rate of return on their products.

== Other products ==
In addition to milk, the brand also sells other products such as ice cream, juice and others. Tres Monjitas branched into ice cream and juice production and sales during 1974.

== Other information ==
The Puerto Rican actor, Luis Daniel Rivera, once worked at lecheria Tres Monjitas, as a wholesale sales agent, during the beginning of his television acting career.
