= Hankyu Hanshin Toho Group =

Japanese keiretsu

- Native name: 阪急阪神東宝グループ
- Romanized name: Hankyū Hanshin Tōhō Gurūpu
- Type: Keiretsu
- Founded: October 1, 2006; 20 years ago
- Founder: Ichizō Kobayashi (for the Hankyu and Toho branches)
- Headquarters: Osaka (Hankyu and H_{2}O) and Tokyo (Toho), Japan
- Area served: Worldwide, primarily Keihanshin
- Subsidiaries: Hankyu Hanshin Holdings Inc.; Hankyu Corporation; Hanshin Electric Railway Co., Ltd.; H_{2}O Retailing Corporation; Toho Co., Ltd.
- Website: www.hankyu-hanshin.co.jp/hankyu-hanshin-toho-group/

The Hankyu Hanshin Toho Group (阪急阪神東宝グループ, Hankyū Hanshin Tōhō Gurūpu) (formerly known as the Hankyu Toho Group (阪急東宝グループ, Hankyū Tōhō Gurūpu) before October 1, 2006) is a Japanese keiretsu (association of businesses) centered around companies established by railway tycoon Ichizō Kobayashi: Hankyu Hanshin Holdings, H_{2}O Retailing and Toho. The keiretsu historically included Sanwa Bank, now part of Mitsubishi UFJ Financial Group, and is still closely linked to MUFG; it also has close ties with the Fujisankei Communications Group.

== Ownership structures ==
The Hankyu Hanshin Toho Group's ownership structures are decentralized and relying on cross-shareholdings and public institutional investment, rather than being owned by a single founding family or parent entity. The primary entities operate as independent, listed corporations that maintain strategic capital and business alliances with one another. These include the following: Hankyu Hanshin Holdings, which operates urban railways, real estate, hotel arms, and entertainment (Takarazuka Revue, Hanshin Tigers), with its own ownership breakdown is heavily institutional, with roughly 35.8% of the company held by financial institutions (like BlackRock and Japanese trust banks) and about 61.6% held by the general public, H_{2}O Retailing, which manages major department stores and supermarkets, and while independent, it maintains cross-shareholdings within the group, holding a minority 1.76% stake in Hankyu Hanshin Holdings, and Toho Co., Ltd, which produces movies (including the Godzilla franchise) and theater. It is another core pillar of the group. Hankyu Hanshin Holdings is the largest single shareholder of Toho, controlling approximately 22.33% of its shares. Other major shareholders in Toho include media conglomerates like Fuji Media Holdings (2.91%) and TBS Holdings (2.66%), as well as its retail sister company, H_{2}O Retailing(5.17%).

== Group companies ==
(note: list incomplete)

=== Hankyu Hanshin Holdings Group ===
- Hankyu Hanshin Holdings, Inc. (January 15, 1906 - May 31, 1907: Mino-o Arima Railway Company, June 1, 1907 - February 3, 1918: Mino-o Arima Tramway Company, February 4, 1918 - September 30, 1943: Hanshin Kyuko Railway Company, October 1, 1943 - March 30, 1973: Keihanshin Kyuko Railway Company, April 1, 1973 - September 30, 2005: Hankyu Corporation, October 1, 2005 - September 30, 2006: Hankyu Holdings, Inc.)
  - Hankyu Corporation (December 7, 1989 - March 28, 2004: Act Systems, March 29, 2004 - September 30, 2005: A prepared company to separate Hankyu Corporation)
    - Takarazuka Revue
  - Hankyu Hotel Management Co., Ltd.
    - Hankyu Hanshin Hotels Co., Ltd.
  - Hanshin Electric Railway Co., Ltd. (June 12, 1899 - July 6, 1899: Settsu Electric Railway Co., Ltd.)
- Hankyu Hanshin Housing Support Ltd.
- Hankyu Hanshin REIT
  - Hankyu Hanshin REIT Asset Management, Inc.
- Hankyu Hanshin Real Estate Investment Advisors, Inc.
- Hankyu Hanshin Clean Service Co., Ltd.
- Toho Company, Ltd.
- Hankyu Hanshin Building Management Co., Ltd.
- Hankyu Nigawa Sports Garden Co., Ltd.
- Tokyo Rakutenchi Comopany, Limited
- Hankyu Airlines Co., Ltd.
- Takarazuka Stage Co., Ltd.
- Takarazuka Eizo Co., Ltd. (Takarazuka Eiga)
- Hankyu Bus Co., Ltd.
- Hankyu Denen Bus Co., Ltd.
- Hankyu Sightseeing Bus Co., Ltd.
- Hankyu Facilities Co., Ltd.
- Hankyu Realty Co., Ltd.
- Hankyu Taxi, Inc.
- Hankyu Hanshin Express Co., Ltd.
- Hanshin Bus Co., Ltd.
- Hanshin Tigers Co., Ltd.
- Hanshin Contents Link, Corp.
  - Billboard JAPAN (with Prometheus Global Media)
- Hanshin Engineering Co., Ltd.
- Hanshin Kensetsu Co., Ltd.
- Hanshin Station Net Co., Ltd.
- Hanshin Taxi Co., Ltd.
- Hanshin Laisure Facilities Co., Ltd.
- Hanshin Real Estate Co., Ltd.
- Osaka Hanshin Taxi Co., Ltd.
- Hankyu Hanshin Card Co., Ltd.
- Umeda Arts Theater Co., Ltd.
- Umeda Center Building
- FM KITA
- OS Co., Ltd.
- Osaka Shintetsu Toyonaka Taxi, Inc.
- Hokushin Kyuko Railway Co., Ltd. (1988–2020 - refer to Hokushin Line for details)
- Kansai Telecasting Corporation
- Kita-Osaka Kyuko Railway Co., Ltd.
- Kobe Electric Railway Co., Ltd.
- Kobe Rapid Transit Railway Co., Ltd.
- Mori-Gumi Co., Ltd.
- Nose Electric Railway Co., Ltd.
- Osaka Airport Transport Co., Ltd.

=== H_{2}O Retailing Group ===
- H_{2}O Retailing Corporation (- September 30, 2007: Hankyu Department Stores, Inc.)
  - Hankyu Hanshin Department Stores, Inc. (October 1, 2007 - September 30, 2008: Hankyu Department Stores, Inc., now owns Hankyu Department Store and Hanshin Department Store)
- Hanshoku Co., Ltd.
- Persona Co., Ltd.

=== Toho Group ===
- Toho Company, Ltd.
- Toho Studios
- Toho Animation Studio
- Toho Animation
- Toho International
- Tokyo Eiga
- Tokyo Rakutenchi Co., Limited
- Nippon Eiga Shinsha Co.
- TOHO-TOWA Co., Ltd.
- International Television Films, Inc.
- Toho Cinemas, Ltd.
- Toho Stella
- Toho Marketing
- Toho Facilities
- Toho Building Management
- Toho Kyoei
- Toho Retail
- OS Co., Ltd.
- TOHO Dance Hall, Ltd.
