= Asai =

Asai or ASAI may refer to:

- Asai (surname), a Japanese surname
- Asai clan or Azai clan, a line of daimyō (feudal lords) during Japan's Sengoku period based in Ōmi Province
- Asai moonsault, a professional wrestling move
- Asai, Etawah, a village in Uttar Pradesh, India
- Average Service Availability Index, a reliability index for electric power utilities
- American Society of Architectural Illustrators, a professional organization representing the business and artistic interests of architectural illustrators
- Advertising Standards Authority for Ireland, the self-regulatory organisation for the advertising industry in Ireland
- Associazione per gli Studi Africani in Italia, the academic society of Africanists in Italy

== See also ==
- Acai, a palm tree used for its fruit and hearts of palm
