= HEP (shopping mall) =

Shopping mall

Coordinates: 34.7040028°N 135.5004466°E

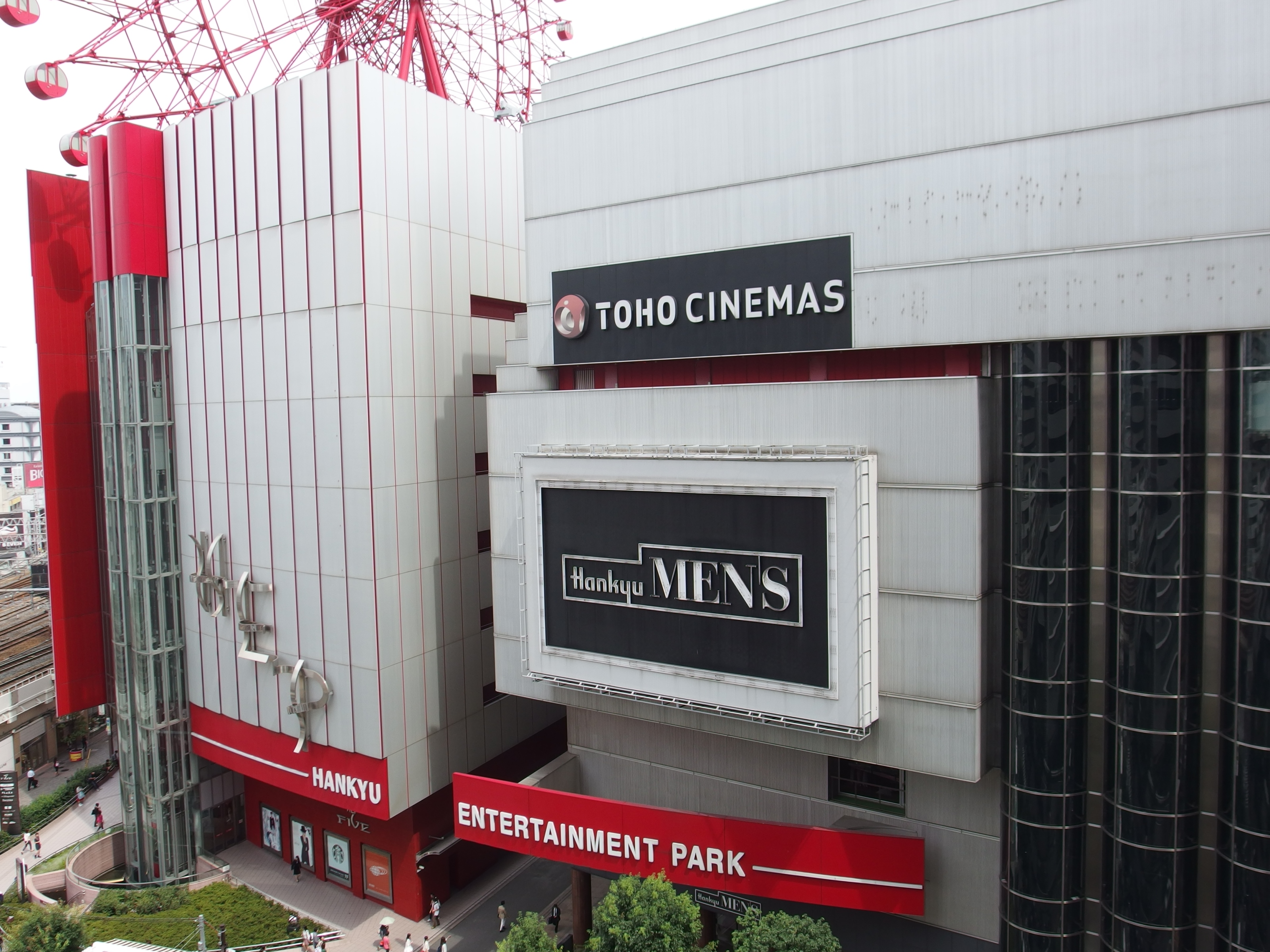
HEP

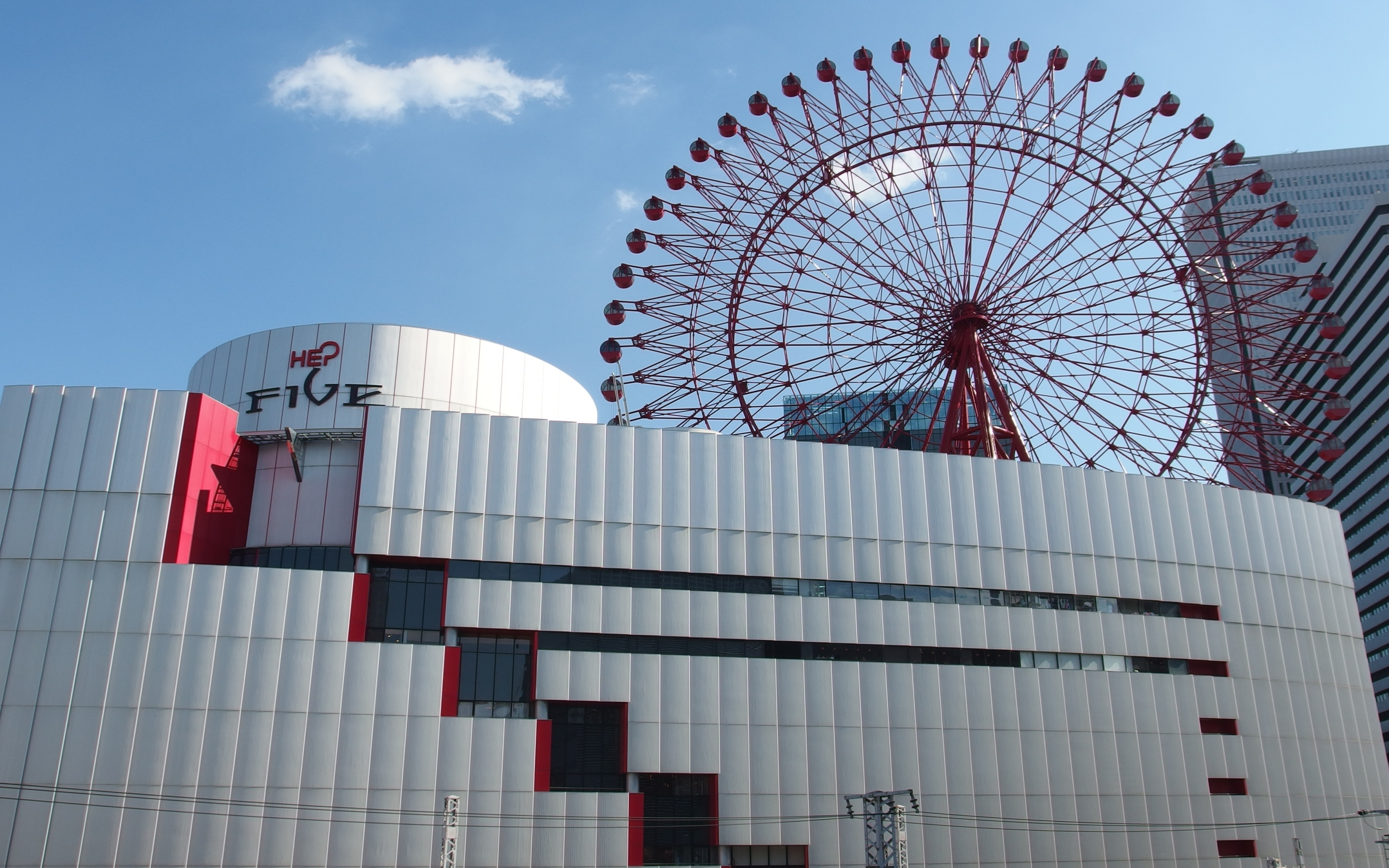
HEP Five

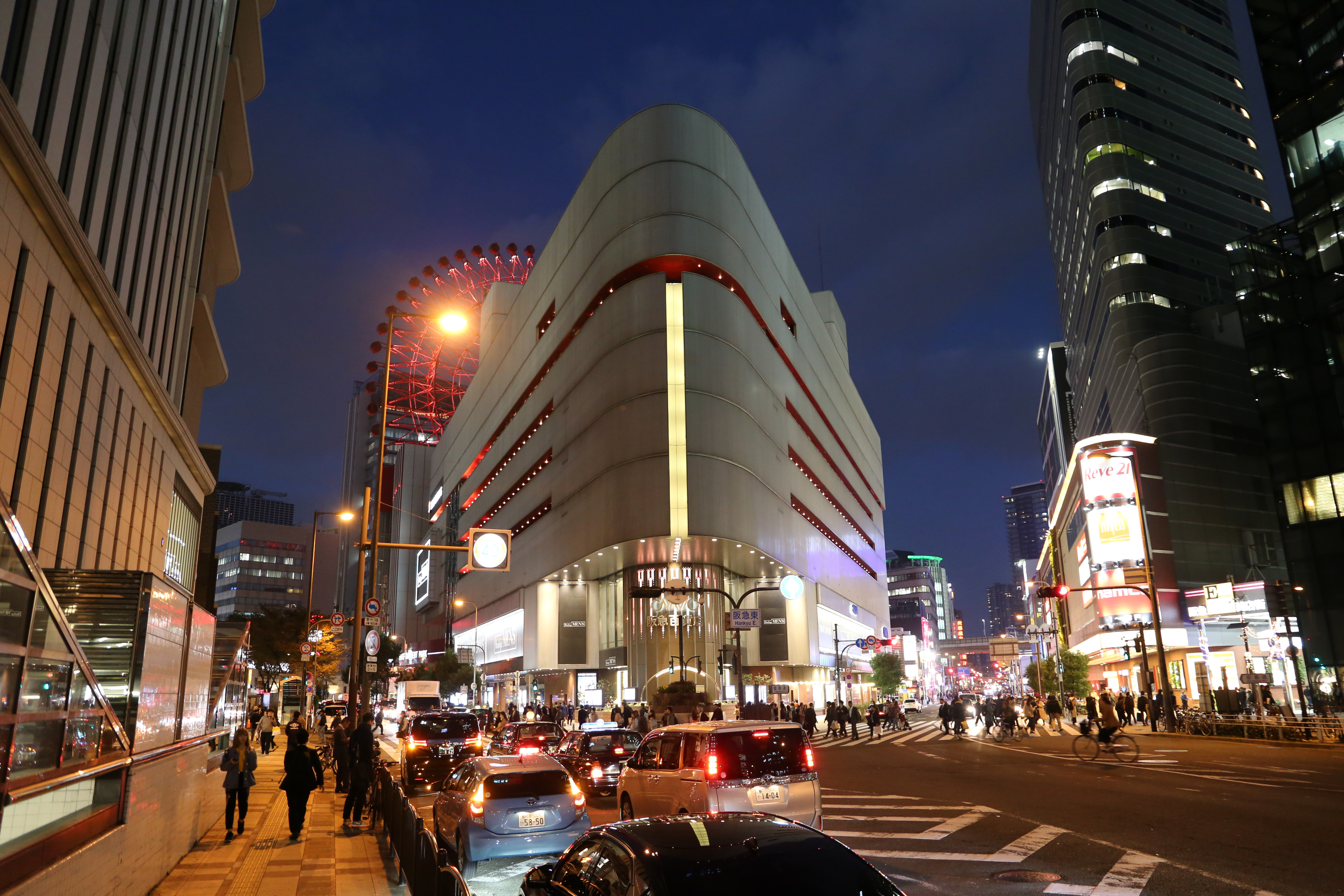
HEP Navio

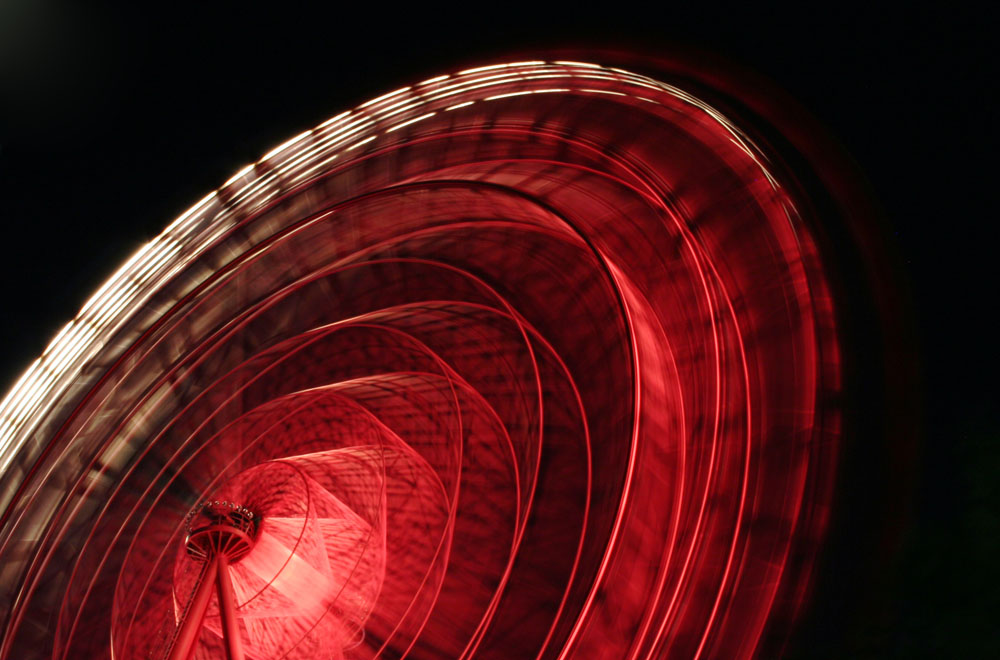
The Ferris wheel atop HEP Five

HEP is a major shopping mall and entertainment center in the Umeda commercial district of Kita-ku, Osaka, Japan, consisting of two separate buildings, HEP Five and HEP Navio.

HEP stands for "Hankyu Entertainment Park". The building is operated by Hankyu Hanshin Holdings's real estate investment trust (REIT) subsidiary Hankyu REIT and co-owned by Hankyu REIT (45%) and Hankyu Realty Co. (55%).

== History ==
The predecessors of HEP are Hankyu Five, a shopping mall that opened in 1971, and Navio Hankyu, a mall and cinema complex that opened in 1980 on the site of what had been multiple cinemas. The two buildings were re-branded in October 1998.

HEP Navio's shopping area closed in October 2007 and re-opened in February 2008 as Hankyu MEN's Osaka, an extension of the adjacent Hankyu Department Store dedicated to menswear.

== HEP Five ==
HEP Five receives about 17 million visitors annually (2007), making it one of the most visited fashion boutique buildings in the Osaka urban region. The core customers at HEP Five are young people, mostly female, from high school age to their early twenties.

The building itself houses over 100 shops (mostly fashion retail shops catering to young consumers), with restaurants, an event hall, amusement facilities (such as Joypolis and the Ferris wheel), a hanging replica of 2 whales designed by Tatsuya Ishii.

=== Ferris wheel ===
The HEP Five building is easily located as it has a large red Ferris wheel with a diameter of 75 metres protruding from its roof (the highest point of the wheel is 106m above the ground, including the height of the building), which is accessible for a fee.

=== Building data ===
Location	5–15, Kakuda-cho, Kita-ku, Osaka
Lot Area	5,596.11 m^{2}
Total floor area	45,266.96 m^{2}
Number of floors	10 floors, 3 underground levels
Completion date	November 1998

== HEP Navio ==
The main tenants of HEP Navio are Hankyu MEN's Osaka on floors B1 to 5, and Toho Cinemas Umeda, an eight-theater multiplex cinema on floors 7 through 9. There are also multiple restaurants in the building. Toho also operates the two-screen Toho Cinemas Umeda Annex in the adjacent Umeda Rakutenchi Building.

== See also ==
- List of shopping malls in Japan
