= Takarazuka Eizō Co., Ltd. =

Takarazuka Eizō Co., Ltd. (宝塚映像株式会社) is a Japanese film production company headquartered in Hyōgo Prefecture, Japan. The company specializes in the production of filmed adaptations of stage performances associated with the Takarazuka Revue and its predecessor organizations.

It operates as part of the Hankyu Hanshin Toho Group, with distribution of its films handled by Toho.

== Background ==
Takarazuka Eizō Co., Ltd. operates in the filming and cinematic presentation of stage works connected to the Takarazuka Revue, an all-female musical theatre company founded in the early 20th century. The company’s activities form part of the broader media and cultural operations surrounding the Revue and its parent corporate group.

The company has played a role in preserving and disseminating Takarazuka-related performances through film, contributing to their accessibility beyond live theatre audiences.

== Activities ==
The company primarily produces feature films and recorded stage adaptations based on productions of the Takarazuka Revue. These works are typically screened in cinemas in Japan and featured in film festivals and special events connected to Takarazuka-related cultural programming.

Takarazuka Eizō’s productions are commonly distributed by Toho, reflecting the company’s integration within the Hankyu Hanshin Toho Group’s film and entertainment network.

== Corporate affiliation ==
Takarazuka Eizō is a subsidiary within the Hankyu Hanshin Toho Group, a Japanese conglomerate with interests in transportation, real estate, and entertainment. Through this affiliation, the company collaborates with other group entities involved in film distribution and theatrical exhibition.
