= Takashimaya =

Japanese department store

Takashimaya Company, Limited

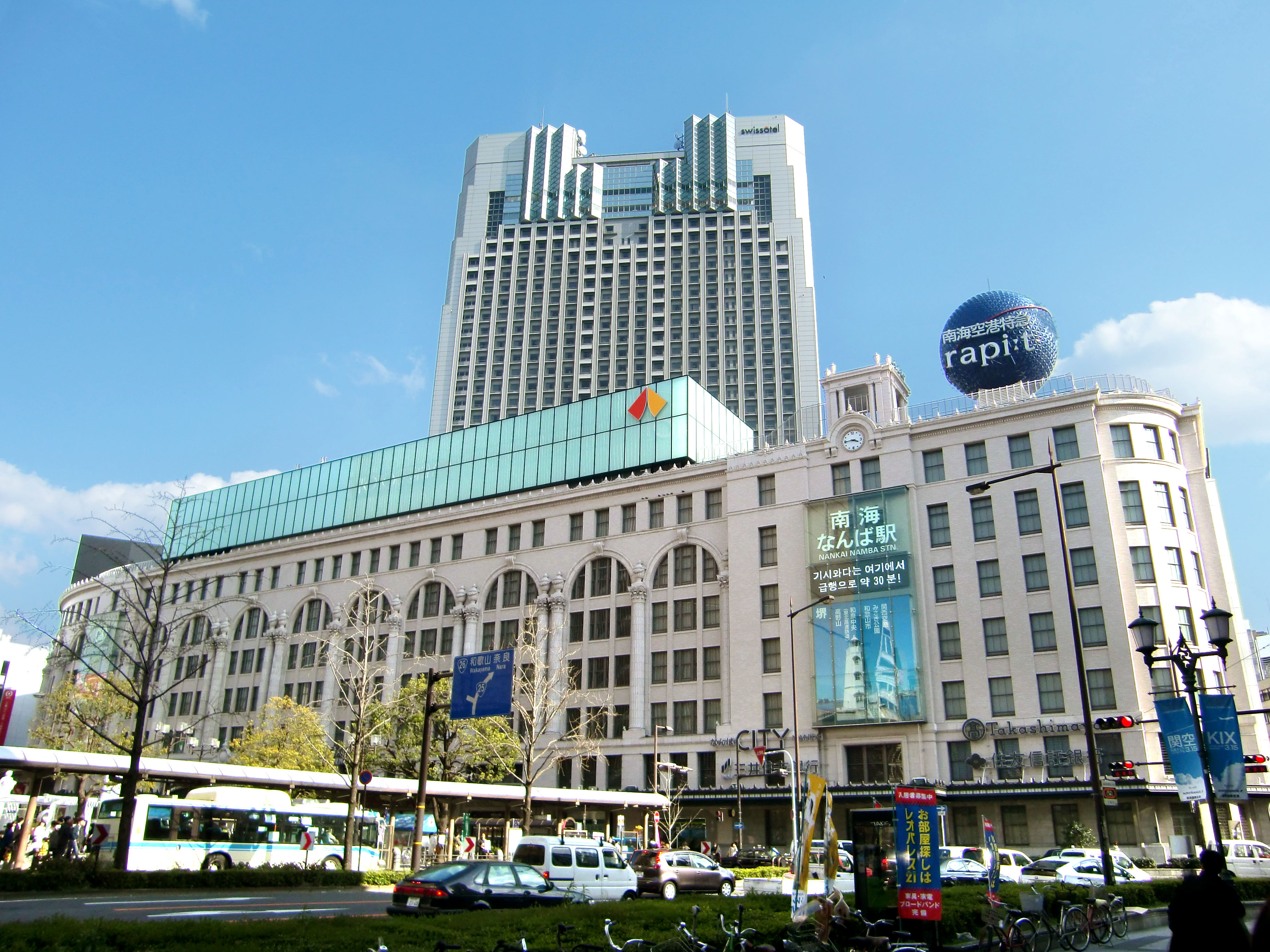
- Nankai Building in Chūō-ku, Osaka; This large complex houses the Namba Station, the Takashimaya Nankai Store and other facilities; it also serves as Takashimaya's headquarters
- Native name: 株式会社髙島屋
- Romanized name: Kabushiki gaisha Takashimaya
- Type: Public KK
- Traded as: TYO: 8233
- Industry: Retailing
- Founded: January 10, 1831; 195 years ago
- Founder: Shinshichi Iida
- Headquarters: Nankai Building, Chūō-ku, Osaka, Japan
- Areas served: Japan; Singapore; Mainland China; Taiwan; Thailand; Vietnam
- Key people: Yoshio Murata (President)
- Services: Department stores E-commerce
- Revenue: JPY 761.1 bn (2022)
- Operating income: JPY 4.1 bn (2022)
- Net income: JPY 5.3 bn (2022)
- Total assets: JPY 979.6 bn (2014)
- Total equity: JPY 408.5 bn (2014)
- Owner: JTSB investment trusts (10.44%); H_{2}O Retailing (cross ownership) (9.31%); TMTBJ investment trusts (6.09%); Nippon Life (2.79%); Kyōeikai (1.94%); Sotetsu (1.35%) (as of 28 Feb 2015)
- Number of employees: 7,223 (2022)
- Website: takashimaya.co.jp takashimaya-global.com
- Footnotes; Financial data per "Fact Book". Takashimaya. Archived from the original on 9 June 2015.

Takashimaya Company, Limited (株式会社髙島屋, Kabushiki-gaisha Takashimaya; Japanese pronunciation: [ta.ka.ɕi.ma.ja]) is a Japanese multinational corporation operating a department store chain selling a wide array of products, ranging from wedding dresses and other apparel to electronics and flatware. It has more than 12 branches in Japan located in 2 regions, and 4 international branches in Asia.

Takashimaya is a member of the Sanwa Group keiretsu.

== History ==
The first Takashimaya store was opened in Kyoto in 1831 as a sole proprietorship owned by Shinshichi Iida, a merchant from present-day Fukui Prefecture. The original store in Kyoto was only 3.6 square meters in area and specialized in selling gofuku (formal kimono). A second Kyoto store opened in 1893, followed by a Tokyo store in 1897 and an Osaka store in 1898. Takashimaya was incorporated as a gomei kaisha (unlimited liability company) in 1909 and converted to a kabushiki kaisha (stock company) in 1919.

Takashimaya began an export business in 1876, following the Meiji Restoration, and established an in-house trading unit in 1887. By 1903 Takashimaya had offices in Paris and London and an export office in Yokohama. The trading unit was spun off as a new stock company, Takashimaya-Iida (高島屋飯田株式会社), in 1913. Takashimaya-Iida later merged with the trading company Marubeni.

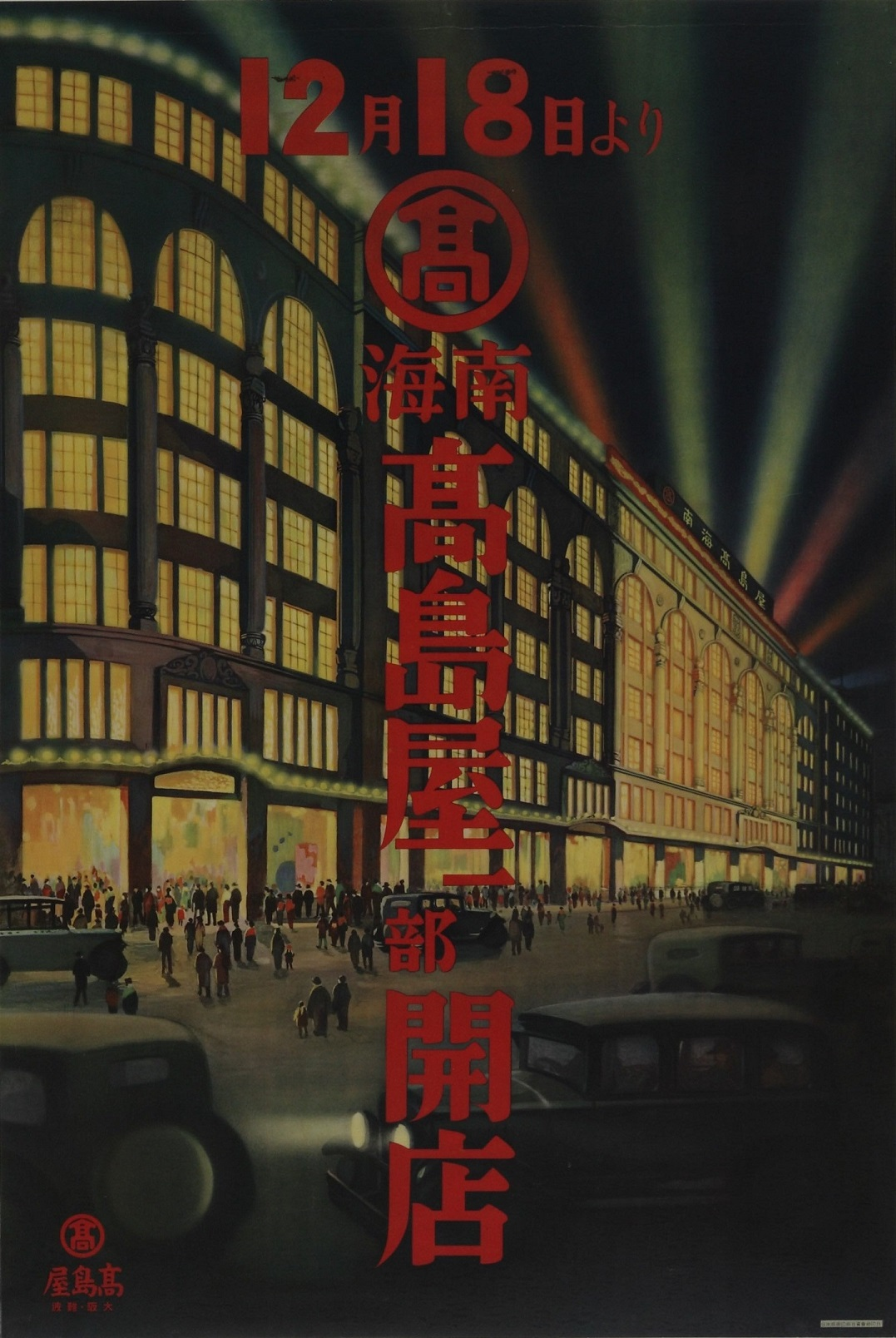
Advertisement poster for the opening of Osaka Takashimaya in 1930

The chain saw a major expansion in the early 1930s. In 1931 it opened a "10, 20 and 50 sen store" in Osaka, a predecessor of today's 100 yen store. Its flagship store in Namba, Osaka opened in 1932, and a second flagship store in Nihonbashi, Tokyo opened in 1933. The Tokyo and Osaka stores were damaged by the firebombings of Tokyo and Osaka in 1945 but were not destroyed, and served as centers for logistics during the occupation of Japan. Due to postwar regulations on the size of new stores, many Takashimaya locations opened from the 1950s onward, including its Yokohama and Yonago stores, were set up as separate companies.

In 1958, Takashimaya opened a store in New York City which eventually occupied 37,000 square feet of floor space at 693 Fifth Avenue. The New York store closed in 2010 as Takashimaya chose to refocus on East and Southeast Asian markets amid struggling sales.

In 1969, Takashimaya opened Japan's first American-style suburban shopping center near Futako-Tamagawa Station, to the southwest of Tokyo.

The Japanese department store industry went through a wave of consolidation during a revenue slump in the 2000s, with Isetan Mitsukoshi Holdings (parent of Mitsukoshi and Isetan) becoming the largest player in the industry, followed by J. Front Retailing (parent of Daimaru Matsuzakaya Department Stores). In 2008, Takashimaya announced plans to merge with H_{2}O Retailing, the parent of the Osaka-based Hanshin Department Store and Hankyu Department Store chains, which would have formed the largest department store operator in Japan. Takashimaya and H_{2}O entered into a cross-shareholding relationship prior to the merger, with each acquiring 10% of the other's stock, but announced the cancellation of their merger in 2010.

In 2019, the company announced it would closing its mainland China store in Shanghai on August 25, but retracted its decision after it gained support from local governments.

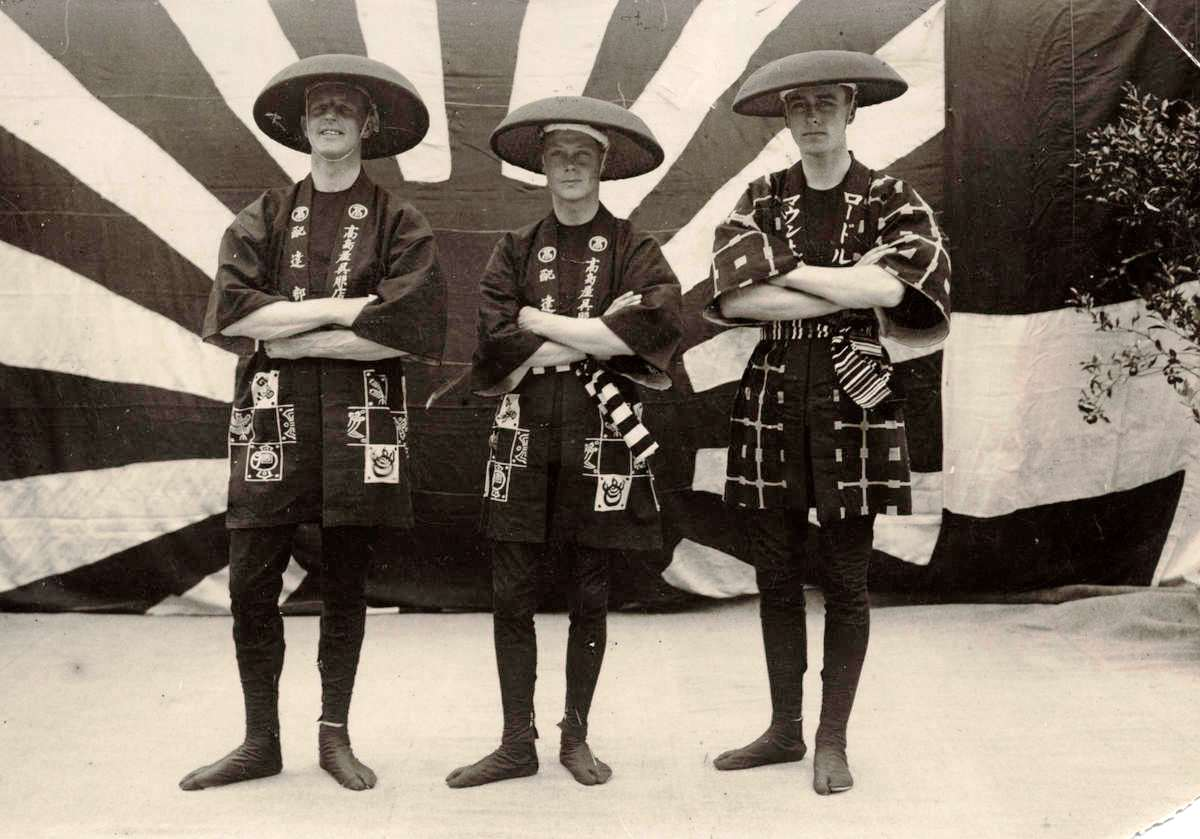
Edward VIII, Louis Mountbatten, 1st Earl Mountbatten of Burma and his staff wearing happi coats from Takashimaya during a visit to Kyoto, 1922

Takashimaya was a member of the International Association of Department Stores from 1962 to 1997.

== Stores ==
=== Directly owned ===
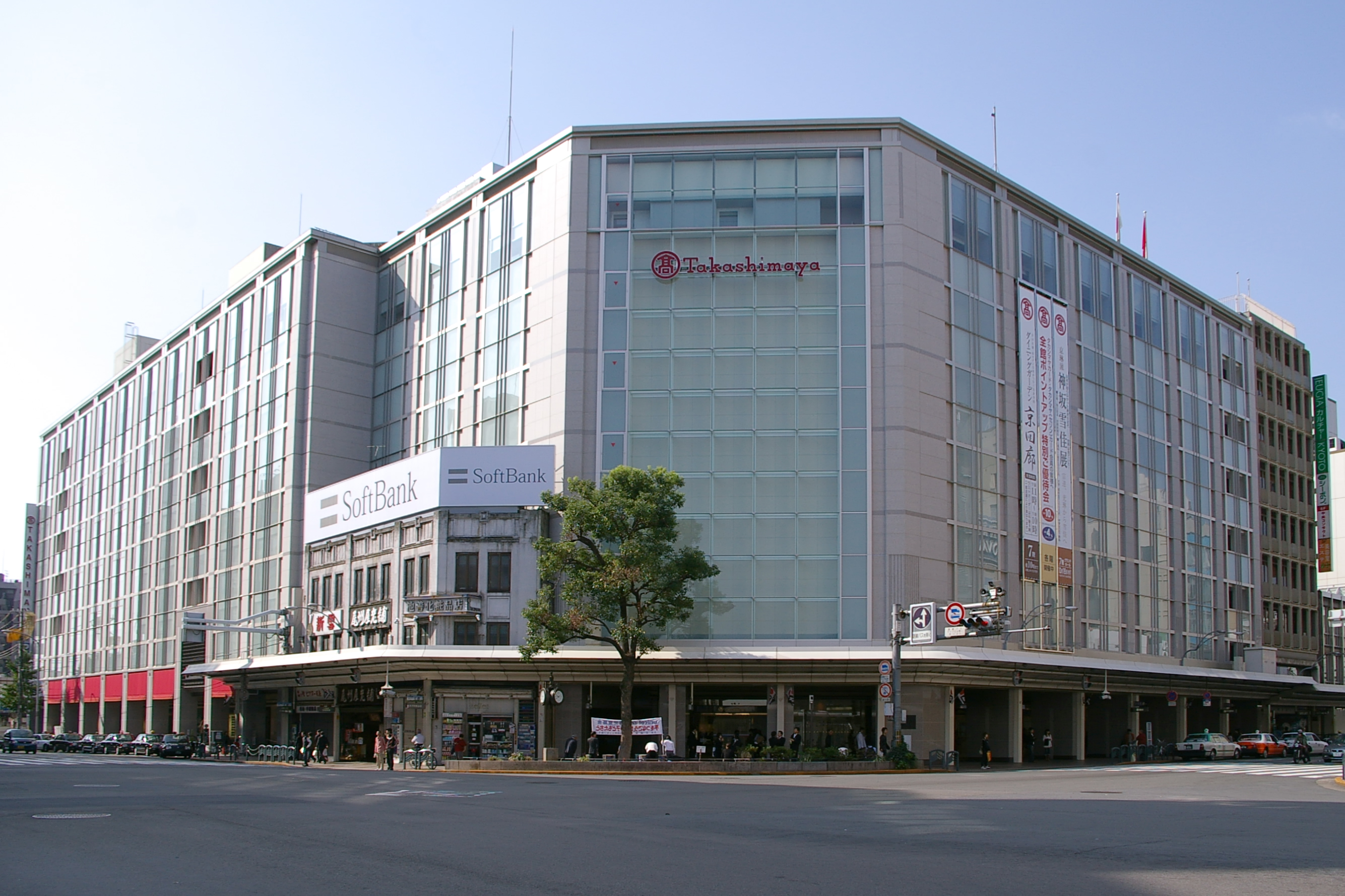
Kyoto Takashimaya

Kansai

- Osaka - Nankai Building 1–5, Namba Gochome, Chuo-ku, Osaka, the north side of Nankai Railway Namba Station
  - Sakai - Nankai Sakaihigashi Building, 59, Mikunigaoka-Miyukidori, Sakai-ku, Sakai, near Sakaihigashi Station on the Nankai Railway Koya Line
- Semboku - Panjo, 1-3-1, Chayamadai, Minami-ku, Sakai, near Izumi-Chuo Station on the Nankai Railway Semboku Line
- Kyoto - 52, Shincho, Shijo-dori Kawaramachi Nishi-hairu, Shimogyo-ku, Kyoto (Kawaramachi Station on the Hankyu Railway Kyoto Line is connected underground.)
  - Rakusai - Rakuseine, 5-5, Oharano Higashi-Sakaidanicho Nichome, Nishikyo-ku, Kyoto, near Rakusai Bus Terminal (Kyoto Municipal Bus, Keihan Kyoto Kotsu, Hankyu Bus)

Kanto

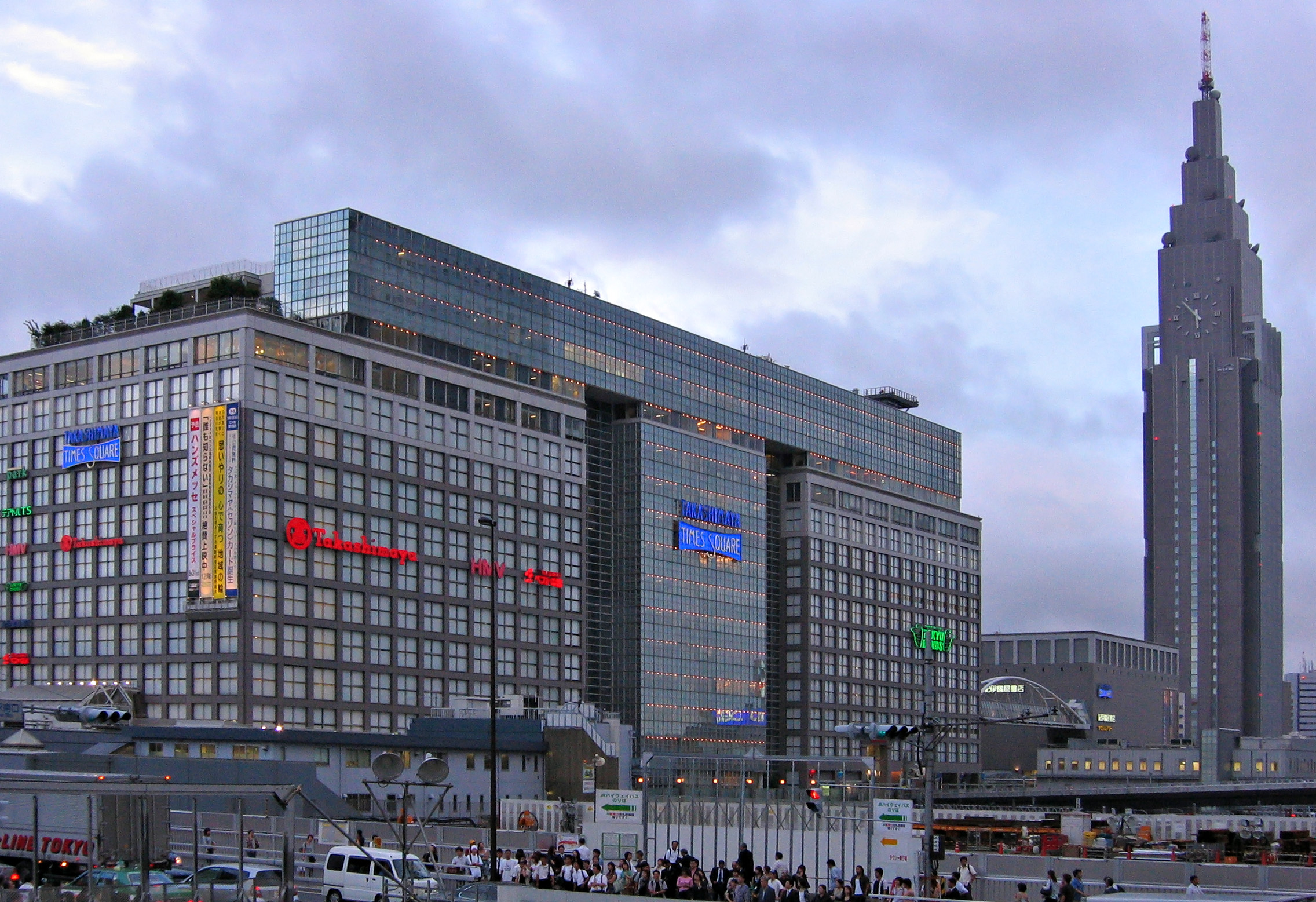
Shinjuku Takashimaya Times Square in Shinjuku, Tokyo

- Nihombashi - 4–1, Nihombashi 2-chome, Chuo, Tokyo, the historical structure selected by Tokyo Metropolitan Government, near Nihombashi Station (Tokyo Metro, Toei Subway)
- Shinjuku - Shinjuku Takashimaya Times Square, 24–2, Sendagaya Gochome, Shibuya, connected with the South Gate of JR East Shinjuku Station and with Shinjuku-sanchome Station on the Tokyo Metro Fukutoshin Line.
- Tamagawa - the core tenant of Tamagawa Takashimaya Shopping Center in 17–1, Tamagawa Sanchome, Setagaya, near Tokyu Futako-Tamagawa Station
- Tachikawa - Faret Tachikawa, 39–3, Akebonocho Nichome, Tachikawa, near Tama Monorail Tachikawa-Kita Station
- Yokohama - Takashimaya Building, Sotetsu Joinus in the same location as Yokohama Station on the Sotetsu Main Line, 6-31, Minami-saiwai Itchome, Nishi-ku, Yokohama
  - Konandai - Konandai Birds, 1–3, Konandai Sanchome, Konan-ku, Yokohama, near Konandai Station on the JR East Negishi Line
- Omiya - 32, Daimoncho Itchome, Omiya-ku, Saitama the east side of Omiya Station (JR East, Saitama New Urban Transit, Tobu Railway)
- Kashiwa - Takashimaya Station Mall, 3–16, Suehirocho, Kashiwa, Chiba the West side of Kashiwa Station (JR East, Tobu Railway)
  - Takashimaya Food Maison Otakanomori - Nagareyama-Otakanomori Shopping Center, in Nagareyama, near Nagareyama-ōtakanomori Station (Tsukuba Express, Tobu Railway Noda Line)

=== Subsidiaries ===
- Takasaki Takashimaya - 45, Asahicho, Takasaki, the west of Takasaki Station (JR East, Joshin Railway)
- Gifu Takashimaya - 25, Hinodecho Nichome (Yanagase), Gifu
- Okayama Takashimaya - 6-40, Hommachi, Kita-ku, Okayama, near JR West Okayama Station
- Yonago Takashimaya - 30, Kakubancho Itchome, Yonago

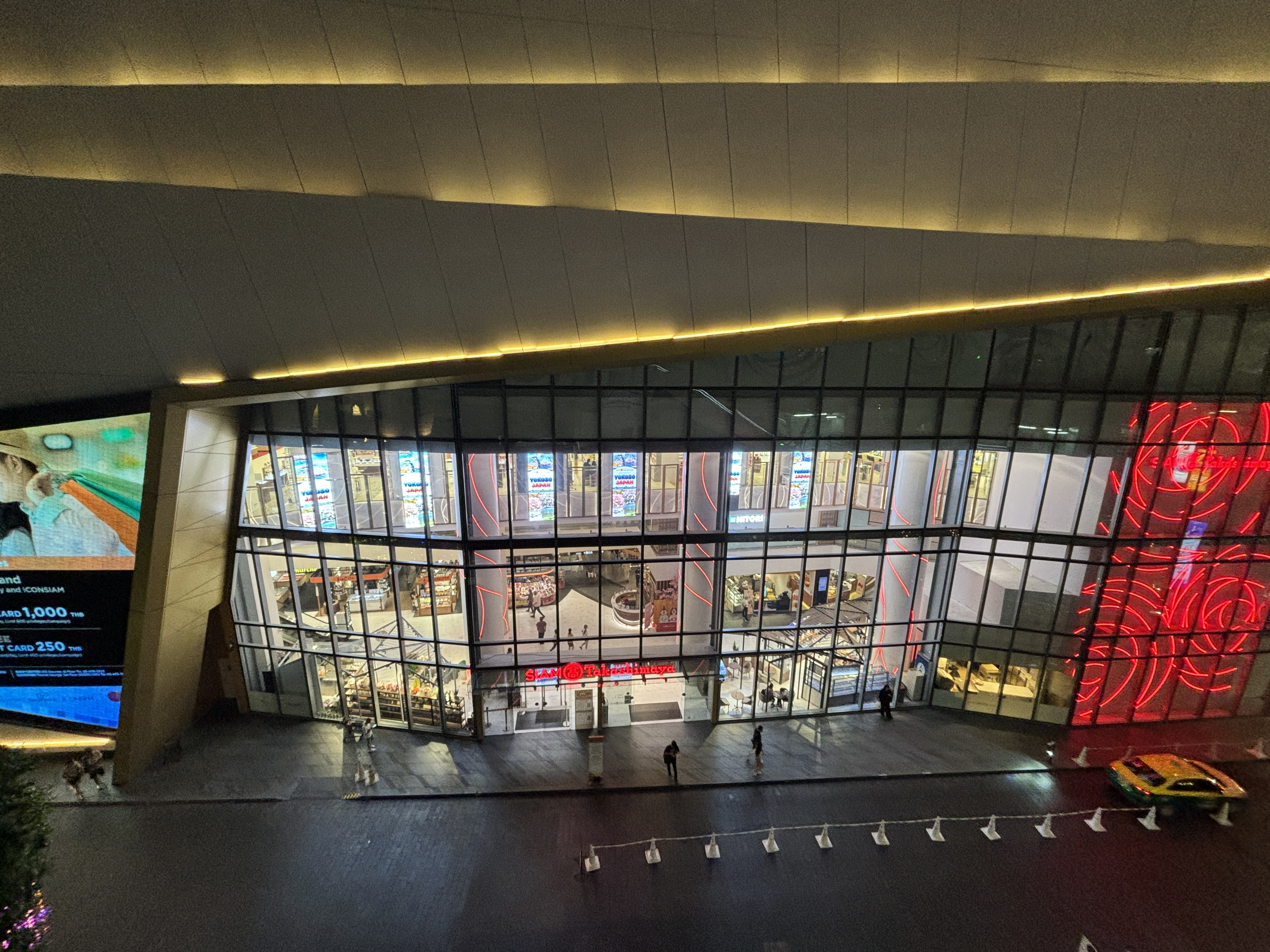
Siam Takashimaya in Thailand at ICONSIAM

=== Domestic joint venture ===
- JR Nagoya Takashimaya - joint venture with JR Central.
  - JR Central Towers, 1–4, Meieki 1-chome, Nakamura-ku, Nagoya, in the east side of JR Central Nagoya Station
- Iyotetsu Takashimaya - joint venture with Iyo Railway Co., Ltd.
  - 4, Minatomachi Itchome, Matsuyama, the same location as Iyotetsu Matsuyamashi Station,

=== Closed domestic stores ===
- Wakayama - the station building of Wakayamashi Station on the Nankai Railway Nankai Line, 306, Higashikuramaecho, Wakayama - closed in August 2014.

=== International joint-ventures ===
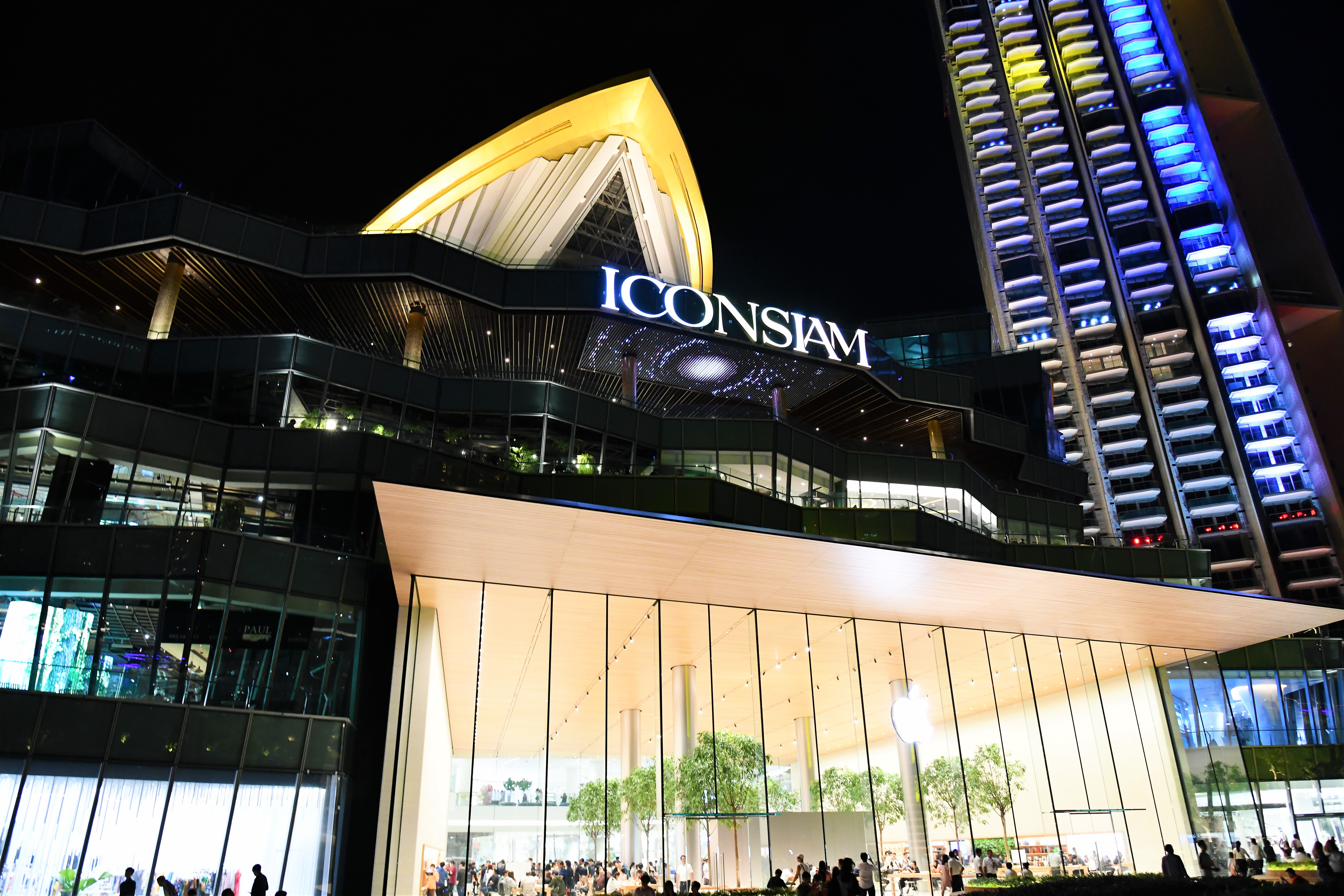
Siam Takashimaya in Thailand at ICONSIAM

- Takashimaya Singapore - joint venture with Ngee Ann Kongsi agreed upon in 1988
  - 391 Orchard Road, Singapore, store located inside Ngee Ann City.
- Shanghai Takashimaya
  - 1438 Hongqiao Road, Changning District, Shanghai, China.
- Ho Chi Minh City Takashimaya - joint venture with Keppel Corporation
  - Saigon Centre Tower 2; 67 Lê Lợi Boulevard & 92–94 Nam Kỳ Khởi Nghĩa Street, Bến Nghé, District 1, Ho Chi Minh City, Vietnam
- Takashimaya Hanoi, opening in 2026
  - Westlake Square Hanoi; Hoàng Minh Thảo Street, Starlake Hanoi New City, Tây Hồ District, Hanoi, Vietnam
  - The Loop by Takashimaya inside Indochina Plaza Hanoi; 241 Xuân Thủy, Cầu Giấy, Hanoi, Vietnam
- Siam Takashimaya - joint venture with Siam Piwat
  - Siam Takashimaya inside Iconsiam; 299 Charoen Nakhon Road, Khlong Ton Sai, Khlong San District, Bangkok, Thailand 10600
  - TAKA Marché inside Siam Paragon

=== Former international stores/joint-ventures ===
- Dayeh Takashimaya - Tianmu, Taipei, Taiwan, joint venture between Dayeh Group (Chinese: 大葉集團) and Takashimaya. Takashimaya reported had sold its 50% stake, thus Dayeh Takashimaya was not mentioned in their corporate website, stating that Takashimaya are no longer affiliated with the joint-venture. Until today, the store is still operating independently using the 'Takashimaya' brand.

=== Closed international stores ===
- New York City Takashimaya - New York City, United States - Opened in 1958, the store eventually occupied 37,000 square feet of space at 693 Fifth Avenue. The store was closed in 2010 and the space was last occupied by a Burberry trench coat pop-up store which closed in May 2023.
- Siam Takashimaya @ Siam Premium Outlet Bangkok; 989, Bang Sao Thong, Bang Sao Thong District, Samut Prakan province 10570; closed in 2025

== See also ==
- List of companies of Japan
- List of department stores
