= Yasuhiro Asai =

Urushi Japanese lacquer

Yasuhiro ASAI
- Born: June 9, 1983 (age 43)
- Awards: The 59th Japan Traditional Art Crafts Exhibition, "Newcomer Award" | The 32nd Japan Traditional Urushi Art Exhibition, The Cultural Affairs Agency Commossioner's Award | The 53rd Japan Traditional Kōgei Kinki Exhibition, "Japan Traditional Kōgei Kinki Prize"

Yasuhiro ASAI（浅井康宏, Asai Yasuhiro, born 9 June 1983）is an urushi Japanese lacquer artist and a maki-e artisan. He was born in Tottori Prefecture, Japan.

== Biography ==
Born on June 9, 1983, Yasuhiro Asai became interested in Urushi (Japanese lacquer) and Maki-e while studying at Kibi Kogen High School. In 2004, he graduated from Takaoka National College, Urushi lacquer Craft Course of the Department of Industrial Design. In 2005, he studied under Kazumi Murose (Holder of Important Intangible Cultural Property).

In 2007, Asai became independent, opening his own maki-e studio. He has been based in Kyoto City since June 2017.

In October 2023, the "Incense Burner with Maki-e and Inlaid Mother-of-pearl, "Yōraku"" was acquired by the British Museum.

In November 2024, at the age of 41, the Okayama Prefectural Museum of Art hosted his first 'homecoming exhibition.'

In September 2025, BVLGARI and Yasuhiro Asai announced two collaborative timepieces LVCEA "Notte di Luce."

Asai is a member of the Urushiko Shigaku Gakkai (History of Lacquerware Association), Nihon Bunkazai Urushi Kyokai(Japan Association for Cultural Property Lacquer), and the Japan Art Craft Association

== Principal Award History ==
- 2002 Japan Urushi Association, "Scholarship Award"
- 2004 Takaoka National College, "Yokoyama Prize"
- 2008 The 51st Japan Traditional Kōgei Chugoku Branch Exhibition, "Tottori Governor's Award"
- 2010 The 54th Tottori Prefectural Art Exhibition, "Scholarship Award"
- 2012 The 55th Japan Traditional Kōgei Chugoku Branch Exhibition, "Scholarship Award"
- 2012 The 59th Japan Traditional Kōgei Exhibition,"Newcomer Award"
- 2015 The 32nd Japan Traditional Urushi Works Exhibition, The Cultural Affairs Agency Commissioner's Award
- 2017 The 57th Exhibition of East Japan Traditional "KŌGEI", "Scholarship Award"
- 2018 Energia Culture and Sports Foundation, Energia Prize, Art Category
- 2021 The 50th Japan Traditional Kōgei Kinki Exhibition, "Kyoto Newspaper Prize"
- 2024 The 53rd Japan Traditional Kōgei Kinki Exhibition, "Japan Traditional Kōgei Kinki Prize"
- 2025 Tottori Prefecture Cultural Encouragement Award

== Exhibits ==
Sources:

- 2015 "Nicolai Bergmann - Flowers & Design", Shangri-La Hotel Tokyo
- 2015 "Urushi no Mirai", Takahashi Setsuro Art Museum of Azumino, Nagano
- 2018 Ambiente 2018 (Germany), Kyoto Zuihodo Booth, Frankfurt
- 2018 Craft Sake Week, "Syukiya", Tokyo
- 2018 "Urushi no Genzai 2018", Nihombashi Mitsukoshi Main Store, Tokyo
- 2018 Art Expo Malaysia 2018, Gallery Hanakagesho Booth, Kuala Lumpur
- 2018 URUSHI Dento to Kakushin (Tradition and Innovation), Kanagawa
- 2019 "Our Collections! ~Tottori-ken no Art Collection no Koremade to Korekara~", Tottori Prefectural Museum, Tottori
- 2019 "Bi no Yokan 2019―∞directions―",Takashimaya, Tokyo; Osaka; Kyoto; Aichi
- 2019 "Gendai Kogei no Tenkai (Development of Contemporary Japanese Arts & Crafts) 2019", Kanazawa Yasue Gold Leaf Museum, Ishikawa
- 2021 CHRISTIE'S NEW YORK "Japanese and Korean Art"
- 2021 "Shikkai - Kaze no Jidai no Keishosyatachi -", Takashimaya, Tokyo; Osaka; Kyoto; Kanagawa
- 2022 "Genshi no Shouchu -Gendai Shitsugeika 4nin no Rinko- Contemporary Urushi Art Exhibition by Four Artists", Ginza Wako, Tokyo
- 2023 CHRISTIE'S NEW YORK "Japanese and Korean Art"
- 2024 "Waza wo Kiwameru Mastering the Art : Exploring the Cultural Messages Connoted in Japanese Works", (Former) KOGEI center, Tokyo National Museum of Modern Art, Tokyo
- 2024 "Special Exhibition: Embracing Traditional Craftsmanship - Where Skill and Beauty Meet (Urushi Art)", the Okayama Prefectural Museum of Art, Okayama
- 2024 "Waza no Bi Mastering the Art : Exploring the Cultural Messages Connoted in Japanese Works", (Former) KOGEI center, Tokyo National Museum of Modern Art, Tokyo
- 2025 "KO+GEI Kyoto 2025" (CURATION⇄FAIR Kyoto concurrent exhibition), Shōsei-en Garden, Kyoto
- 2026 "KO+GEI 2026", Tokyo Art Club, Tokyo

== Solo exhibitions ==
- April 2017 "光をめぐる[Hikari wo Meguru] (Follow the Light)", Seibu Ikebukuro, Tokyo
- November 2021 "情熱[Jonetsu]ーPassionー", Seibu Ikebukuro, Tokyo

== Collections ==
- John C. Weber Collection
- L.U.CEUM Collection, Chopard Manufacture, Fleurier, Switzerland
- FONDAZIONE MASI

== Public Collection ==
- British Museum

== Selected Projects / Others ==
- MASI "Costasera Contemporary Art" 2023
- Bvlgari LVCEA "Notte di Luce" 2025

== Books ==
- -光をめぐる- [Hikari wo Meguru (Follow the Light)] Yasuhiro Asai A Collection of Maki-e Works Author: Yasuhiro Asai. Published by Studio Zipangu First Edition, April 1, 2017, ISBN 978-4-9909546-0-4
- 情熱-Passion- Yasuhiro Asai A Collection of Lacquerware Works Author: Yasuhiro Asai. Published by Studio Zipangu First Edition, November 10, 2021, ISBN 978-4-9909546-1-1
