= Nicolai Bergmann =

Danish-born artist

- Born: June 12, 1976 (age 50); Dragør, Denmark
- Known for: Flower Art & Design
- Style: Contemporary floral design
- Website: NicolaiBergmann.com

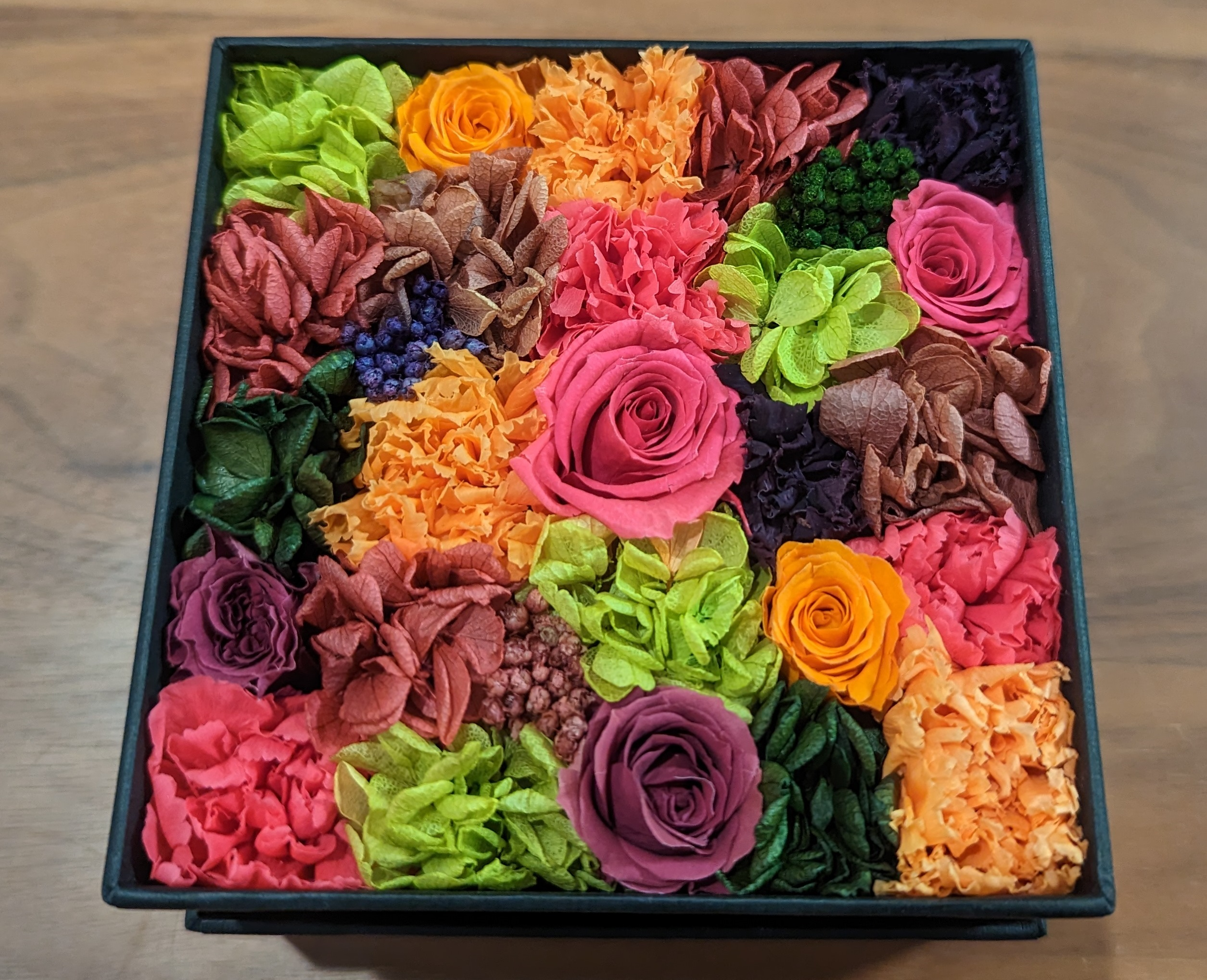
Nicolai Bergman's masterpiece, "Flower Box"

Nicolai Bergmann (born June 12, 1976) is a Tokyo-based Danish flower artist and designer best known for his flower boxes, a technique that started a trend in Japan.

Bergmann's work has been widely covered by periodicals in Japan, including articles in The New York Times Style Magazine: Japan, Epoch Magazine, Espresso Fukuoka, Discover Japan, Fole, Glow, Goethe Magazine, Mrs, and WWD Japan.

Bergmann's floral designs have been exhibited in Japan, including Shikaumi Shrine, Houmangu Kamado Shrine, and Shinto Dazaifu Tenmangu in 2016, and the digital art installation for the Hanami 2050 exhibit in 2018. Bergmann's designs combine traditional floral design with his western aesthetic influence.

Bergmann teaches at their floristry school in Omotesando, runs a design consultancy Nicolai Bergmann Flowers & Design, and operates a flower themed Nomu Café.

== Biography ==
A native of Dragør, Denmark, Bergmann first began his interest in flowers as a child by making Christmas wreaths with friends. At 16, he enrolled in a three-year technical program in Denmark which included a combination of course work and internships at flower shops.

In 1998, Bergmann moved to Japan to work with Hama Florist, and in 2001, they opened a store with his name to have a more western focused brand. In 2005, Bergmann established his own stores and brand as "Nicolai Bergmann Flowers and Design", separating from Hama Flowers. In 2010, Bergmann founded the flower themed Nomu Café in Omotesando

In 2017, Bergmann introduced a line of jewelry called "Natur", which seeks inspiration from floral arrangements.

In 2018, Bergmann created a flower installation at Kiyomizu Temple as part of Estee Lauder Group's "Pink Ribbon" Breast Cancer Campaign.

== See also ==
Official Site

Yasuhiro ASAI
