= Hankyu Hanshin Hotels =

Japanese hotel chain

Hankyu Hanshin Hotels Company, Ltd.
- Company type: Hotels
- Industry: Hospitality
- Founded: 1958 (as Osaka Airlines Co., Ltd.)
- Headquarters: Kita-ku, Osaka, Japan
- Area served: Japan
- Key people: Yoshihiro Nakagawa (President)
- Products: Hotels
- Parent: Hankyu Hanshin Holdings
- Divisions: Hankyu Hotels; Hanshin Hotels; Daiichi Hotels
- Website: www.hankyu-hotel.com

Hankyu Hanshin Hotels (阪急阪神ホテルズ) is a chain of hotels headquartered in Kita-ku, Osaka, Japan. It is a subsidiary of Hankyu Hanshin Holdings. As of 2019, it has 46 properties (opened or announced) in Japan, 19 directly operated and 27 under franchise management.

== History ==
The origins of the business can be traced back to 1926, when Ichizō Kobayashi, the founder of Hankyu Railway acquired the Takarazuka Hotel in Takarazuka.

On August 8, 1964, the New Hankyu Hotel opened in Umeda, Osaka, incorporated with Hankyu Umeda Station.

On May 26, 2000, Daiichi Hotel Ltd. went bankrupt after applying for the Corporate Rehabilitation Law.

On November 1, 2001, Hankyu Corporation invested 1 billion yen to purchase the Daiichi Hotels Group. Following its acquisition in 2002, it became a subsidiary of Hankyu Hotels.

On April 1, 2005, Hankyu-Daiichi Hotels Company Ltd. and Hotel New Hankyu Group was merged to become Hankyu-Daiichi Hotels Group.

On October 1, 2006, Hankyu Holdings became the wholly owning parent company of Hanshin Electric Railway Co., Ltd. and the holdings were renamed Hankyu Hanshin Holdings, Inc. Hankyu-Daiichi Hotels also changed the legal name to Hankyu Hanshin-Daiichi Hotels Co., Ltd. on the same day.

== Group hotels ==
=== Hankyu Hotels ===
- Kantō
  - Tokyo
    - Ginza Creston Hotel (Chūō)
- Kansai
  - Hyōgo Prefecture
    - Takarazuka Hotel (Takarazuka)
  - Kyoto Prefecture
    - Hotel New Hankyu Kyoto (Kyoto)
  - Osaka Prefecture
    - Hotel Hankyu International (Osaka)
    - Hotel New Hankyu Osaka (Osaka)
    - Hotel New Hankyu Annex (Osaka)
    - Senri Hankyu Hotel (Toyonaka)
    - Hotel Hankyu Expo Park (Suita)
- Shikoku
  - Kōchi Prefecture
    - The Crown Palais New Hankyu Kochi (Kōchi)

=== Hanshin Hotels ===
- Kansai
  - Osaka Prefecture
    - Hotel Hanshin Osaka (Osaka)
    - Hotel Hanshin Annex Osaka (Osaka)

=== Remm ===
Remm is the brand name for city hotels.

- Kantō
  - Tokyo
    - Remm Hibiya (Chiyoda)
    - Remm Akihabara (Chiyoda)
    - Remm Roppongi (Minato)
    - Remm Tokyo Kyobashi (Chūō)
- Kansai
  - Osaka Prefecture
    - Remm Shin-Osaka (Osaka)
- Kyūshū
  - Kagoshima Prefecture
    - Remm Kagoshima (Kagoshima)

=== Daiichi Hotels ===
- Tōhoku
  - Yamagata Prefecture
    - Tokyo Daiichi Hotel Tsuruoka (Tsuruoka)
    - Tokyo Daiichi Hotel Yonezawa (Yonezawa)
- Kantō
  - Kanagawa Prefecture
    - Daiichi Inn Shonan (Fujisawa)
  - Tokyo
    - Daiichi Hotel Tokyo (Minato)
    - Daiichi Hotel Annex (Chiyoda)
    - Daiichi Hotel Tokyo Seafort (Shinagawa)
    - Daiichi Hotel Ryogoku (Sumida)
    - Daiichi Inn Ikebukuro (Toshima)
    - Kichijōji Daiichi Hotel (Musashino)
- Chūbu
  - Aichi Prefecture
    - Tokyo Daiichi Hotel Nishiki (Nagoya)
  - Toyama Prefecture
    - Toyama Daiichi Hotel (Toyama)
    - Daiichi Inn Shinminato (Imizu)
- Kansai
  - Osaka Prefecture
    - Osaka Daiichi Hotel (Osaka)
  - Shiga Prefecture
    - Hotel Boston Plaza Kusatsu (Kusatsu)
- Chūgoku
  - Yamaguchi Prefecture
    - Tokyo Daiichi Hotel Shimonoseki (Shimonoseki)
- Shikoku
  - Ehime Prefecture
    - Tokyo Daiichi Hotel Matsuyama (Matsuyama)
    - Imabari International Hotel (Imabari)
  - Kagawa Prefecture
    - Takamatsu International Hotel (Takamatsu)

=== Others ===
- Tokyo Daiichi Hotel Iwanuma Resort (Iwanuma)
- Tokyo Daiichi Hotel Shin-Shirakawa (Shirakawa)
- Hotel Ours Inn Hankyu (Shinagawa)
- Umeda OS Hotel (Osaka)
- Arima Kirari (Kobe)
- Amanohashidate Hotel (Miyazu)
- Hotel Royal Hill Fukuchiyama & Spa (Fukuchiyama)
- Hotel Bay Gulls (Tajiri, Sennan District, Osaka)
- Hotel Ichibata: (Matsue)
- Kure Hankyu Hotel: (Kure)
- JR Hotel Clement Takamatsu: (Takamatsu)
- JR Hotel Clement Tokushima: (Tokushima)

== Gallery ==
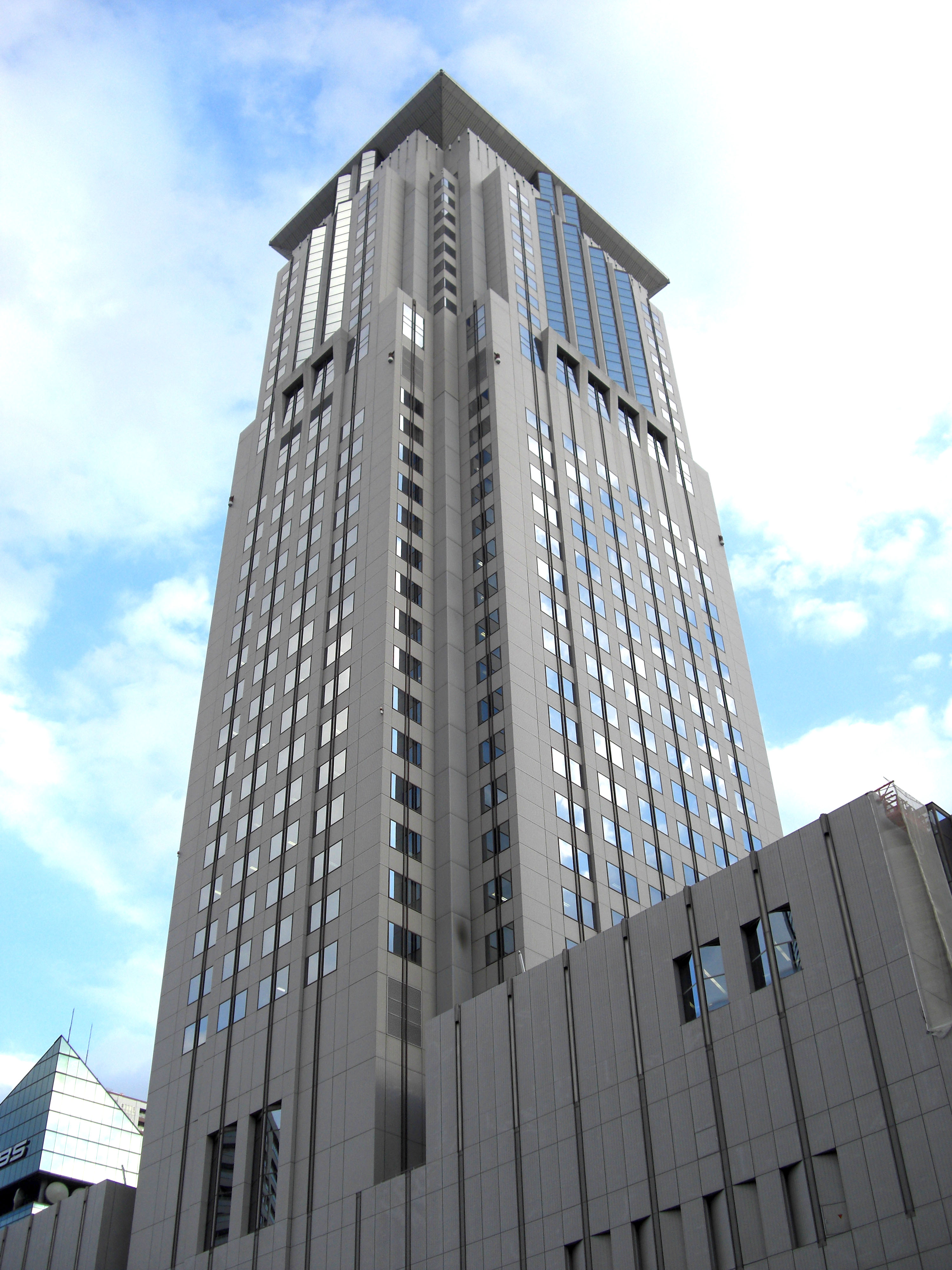
Hotel Hankyu International, Osaka

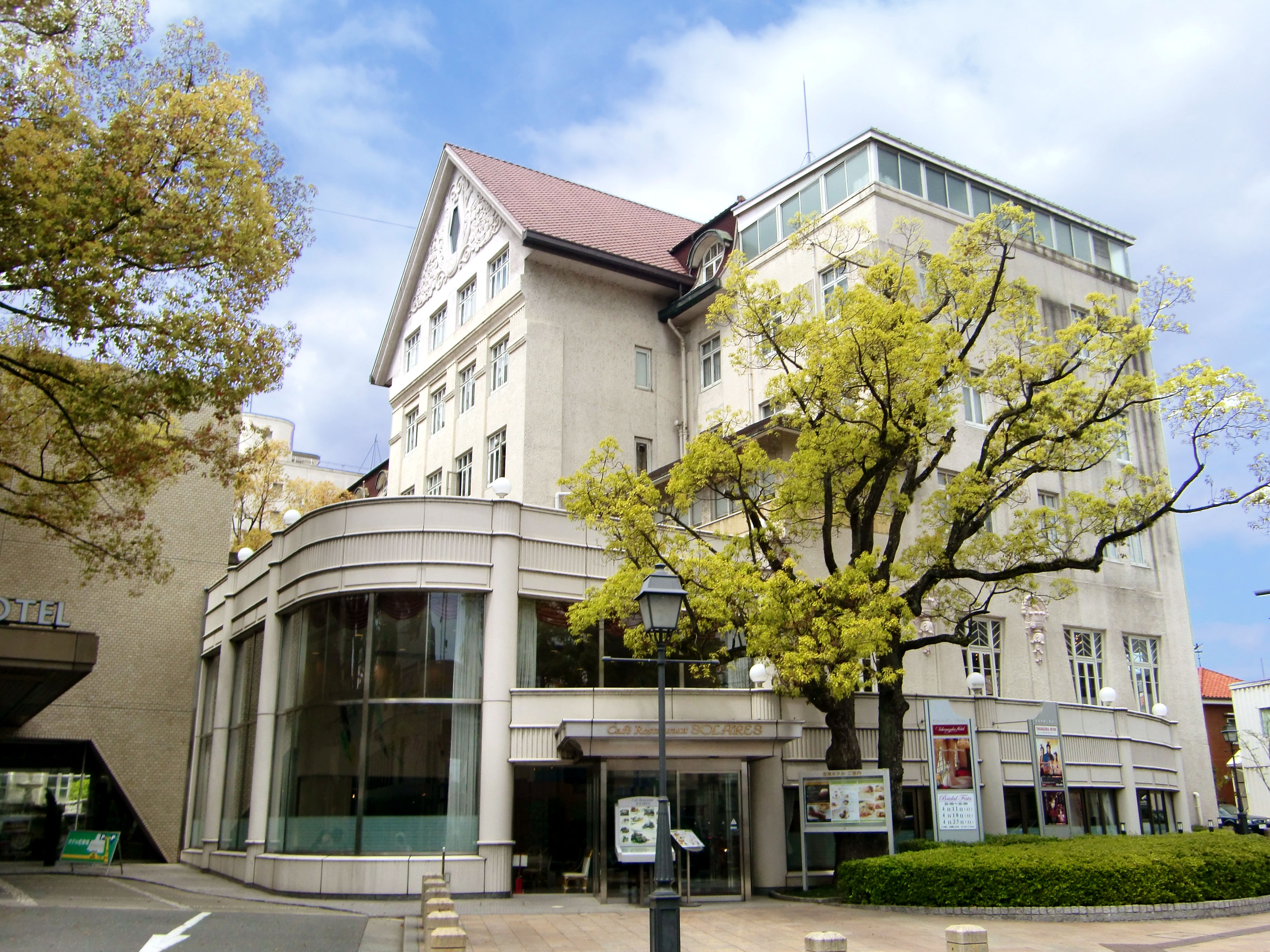
Takarazuka Hotel, Takarazuka

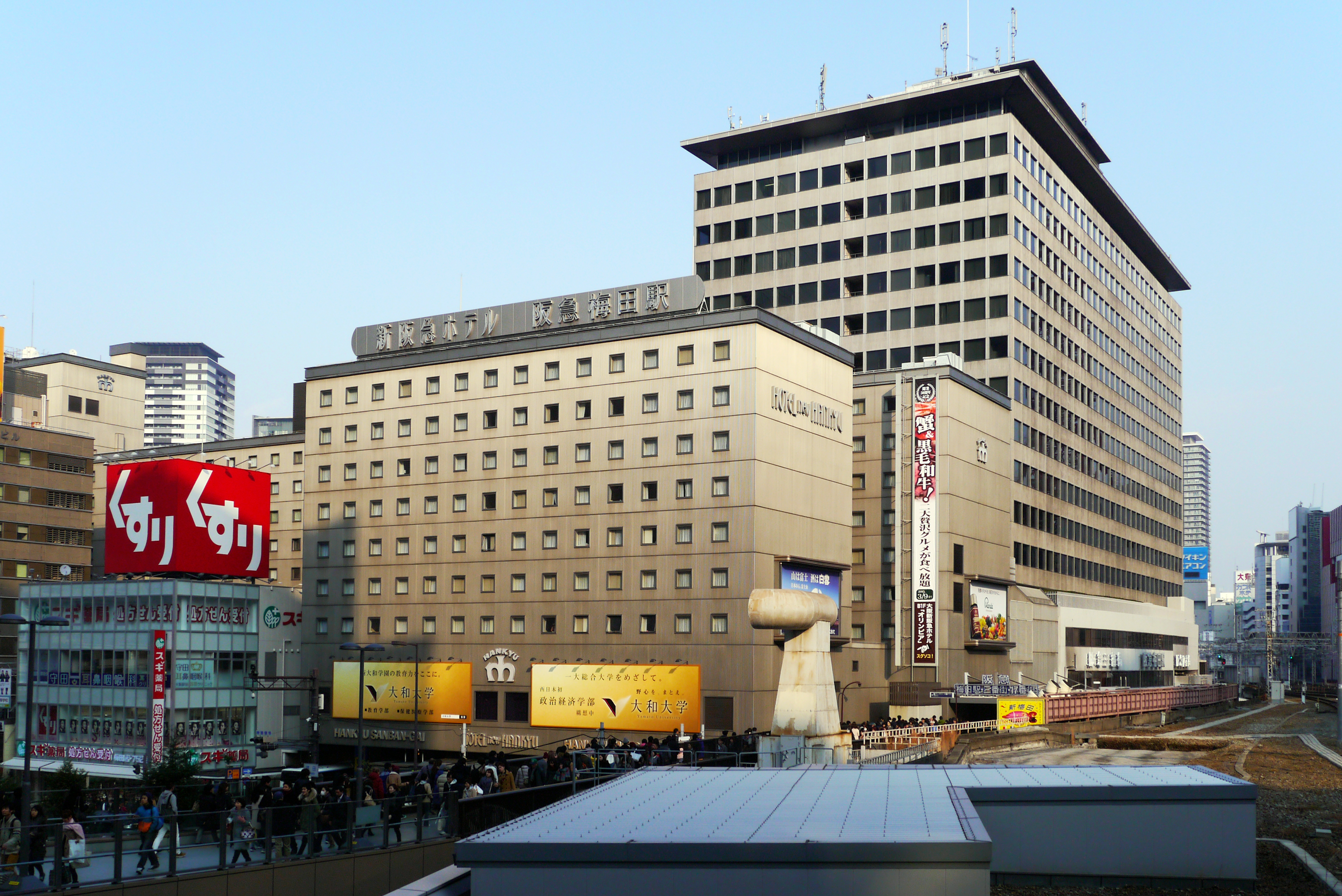
Hotel New Hankyu Osaka

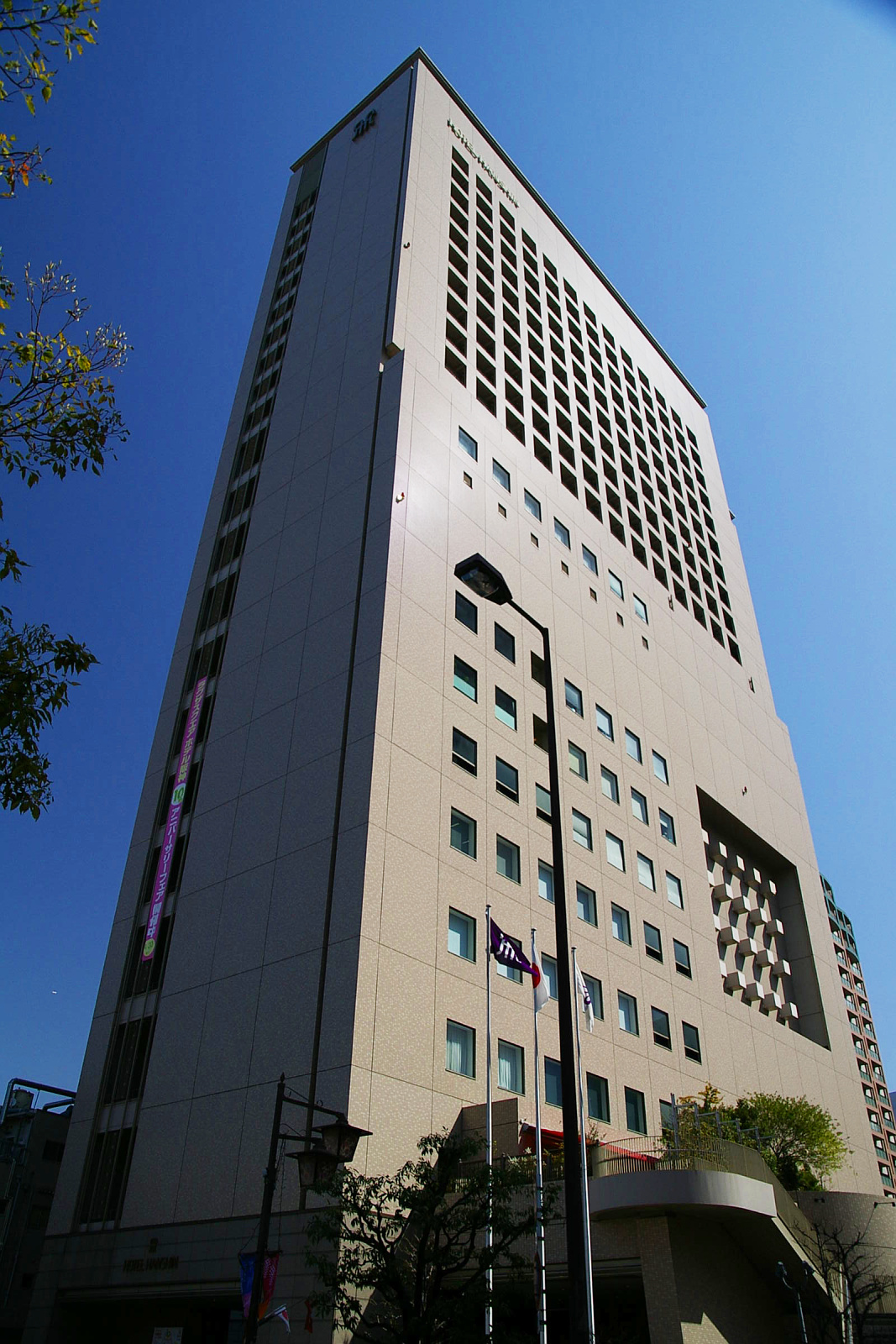
Hotel Hanshin Osaka

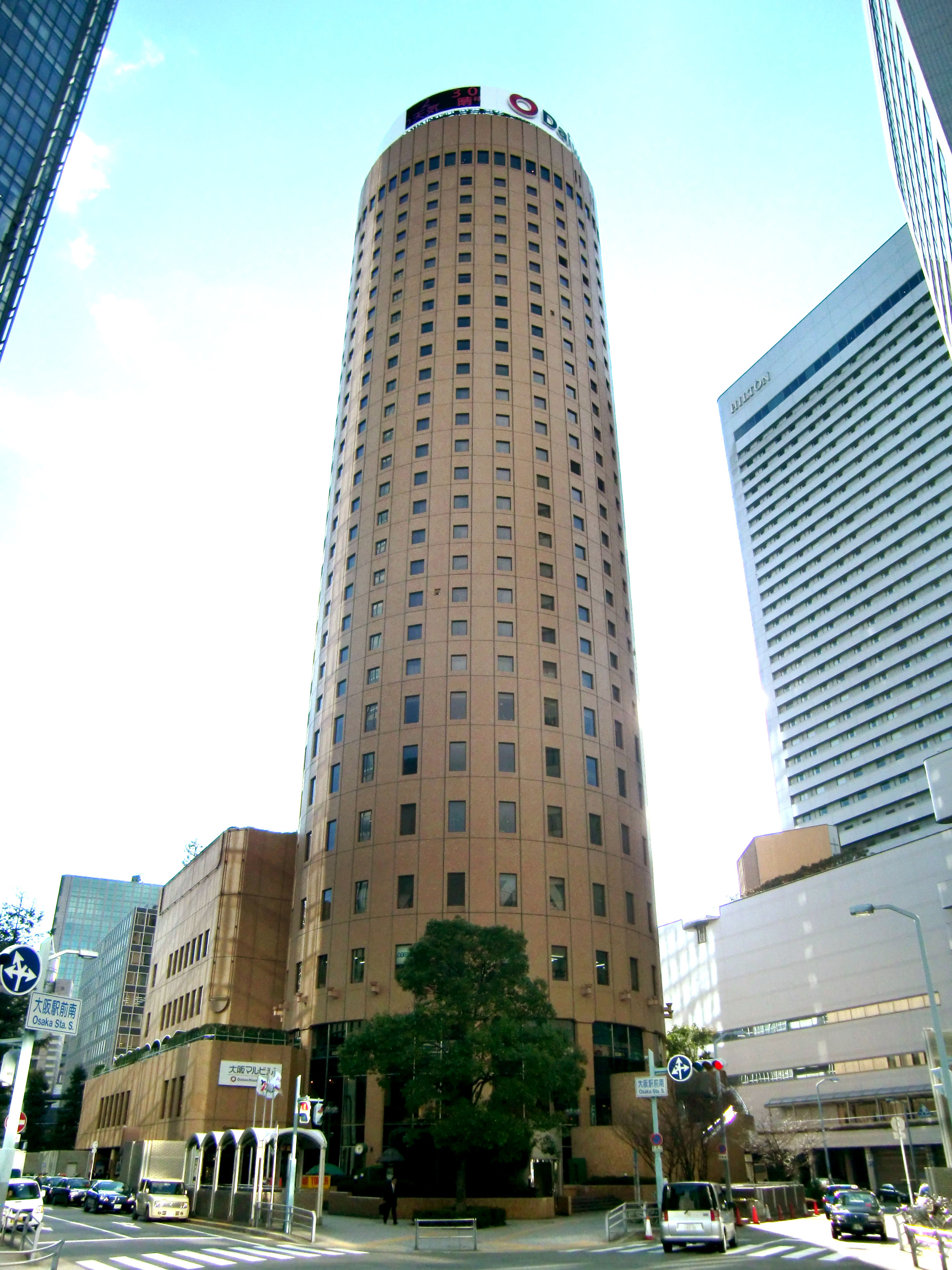
Osaka Daiichi Hotel, incorporating with Osaka Marubiru

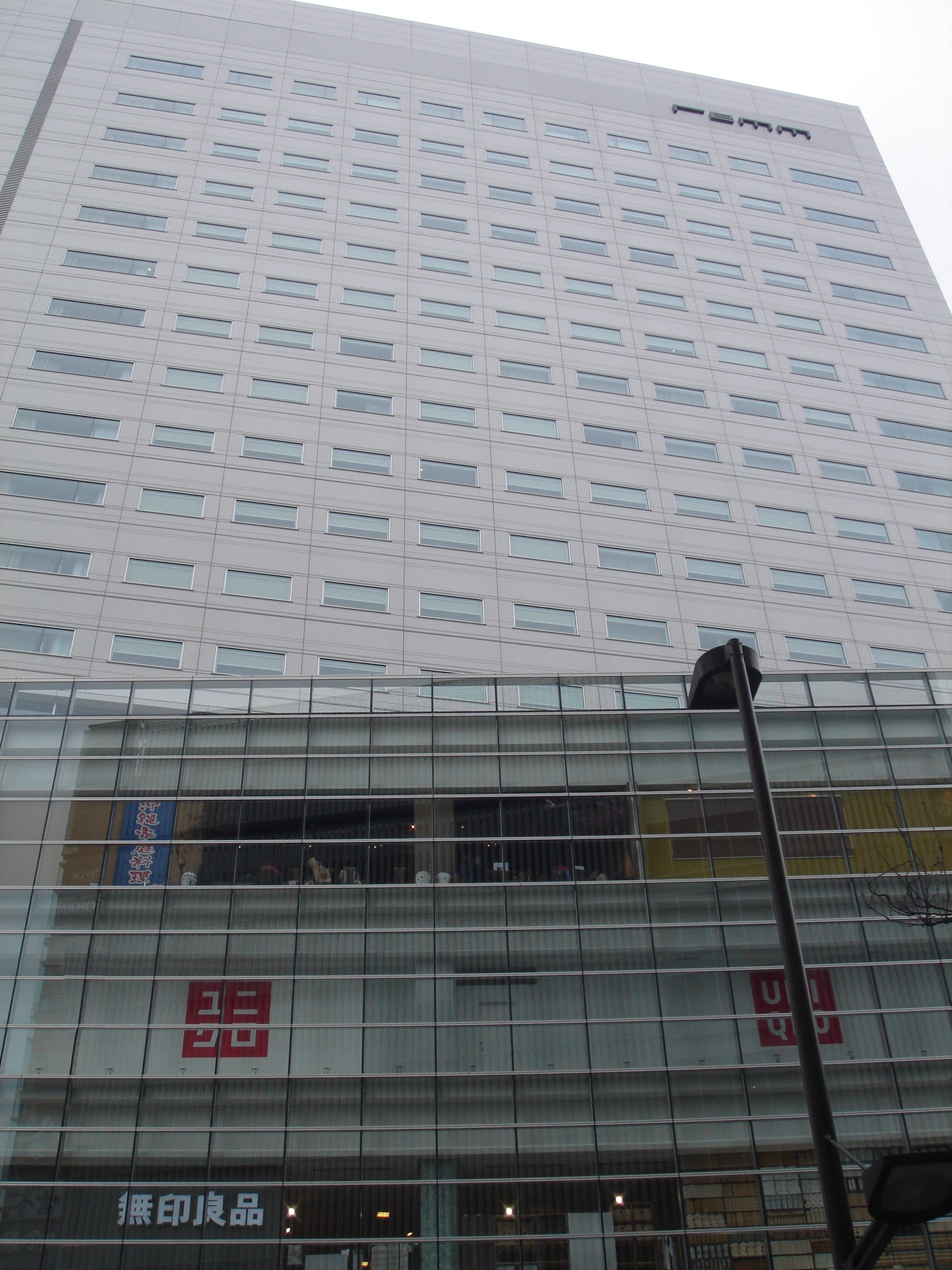
Remm Akihabara, near Akihabara Station

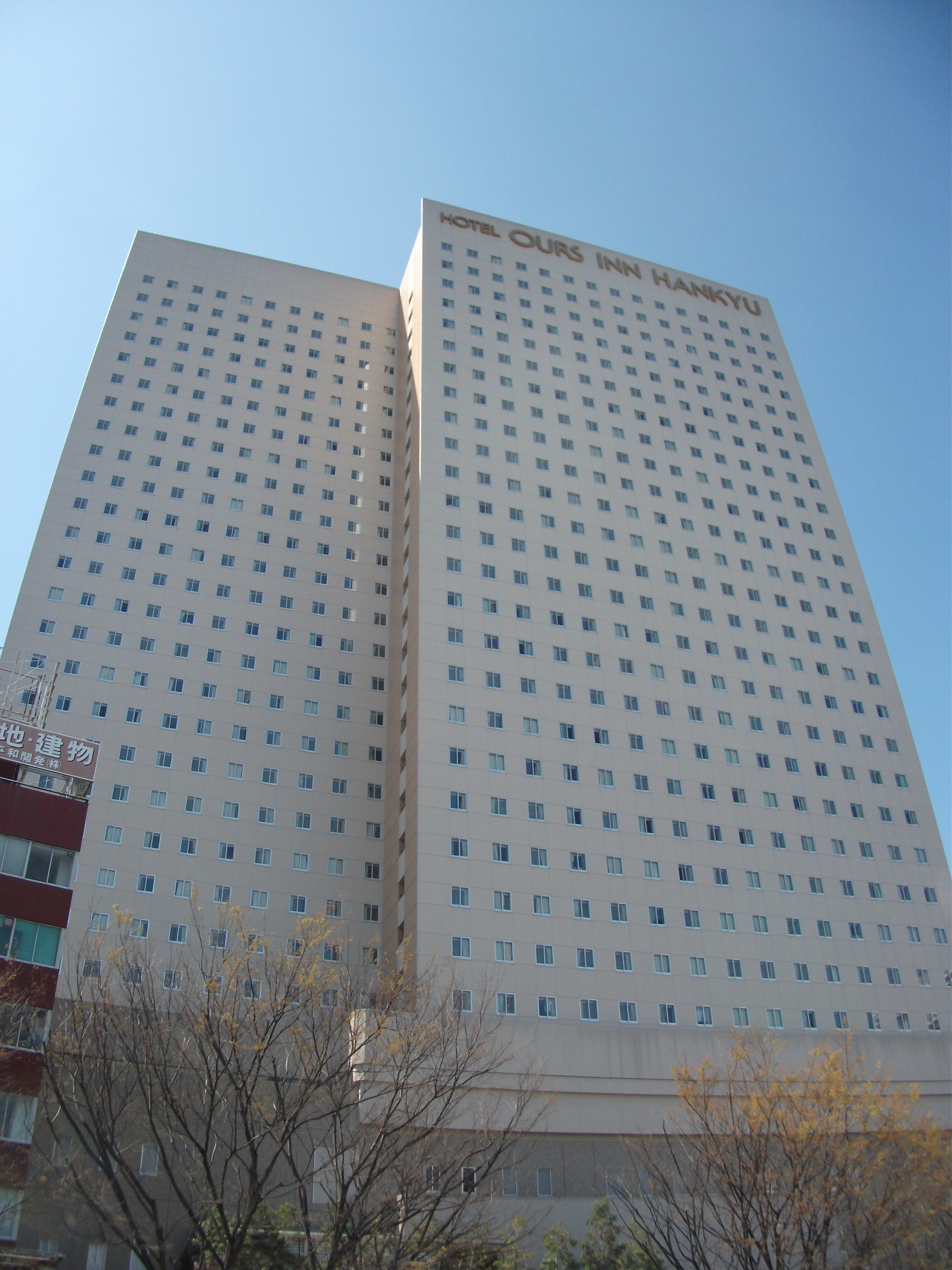
Hotel Ours Inn Hankyu, Tokyo

== See also ==
- Hankyu Hanshin Holdings
