= H2O Retailing =

Stock holding company

H_{2}O Retailing Corporation
- Native name: エイチ・ツー・オー リテイリング株式会社
- Romanized name: Eichi Tsū Ō Riteiringu kabushiki gaisha
- Formerly: Hankyu Department Stores, Inc. (1947—2007)
- Type: Public (Kabushiki gaisha)
- Traded as: TYO: 8242
- Industry: Retail
- Founded: March 7, 1947 in Osaka
- Founder: Ichizō Kobayashi (for the Hankyu Department Stores branch)
- Headquarters: Hankyu Department Store Umeda Main Store; 8-7, Kakudacho, Kita-ku, Osaka, Japan; Registered office Osaka Umeda Twin Towers South; 13-1, Umeda 1-chōme, Kita-ku, Osaka, Japan; Corporate headquarters
- Key people: Shunichi Sugioka (Chairman and CEO); Jun Wakabayashi (President)
- Revenue: ▲¥505,589 million (March 31, 2012)
- Operating income: ▼¥9,958 million (March 31, 2012)
- Net income: ▼¥1,057 million (March 31, 2012)
- Total assets: ▼¥335,230 million (March 31, 2012)
- Total equity: ▲¥168,855 million (March 31, 2012)
- Owner: Hankyu Hanshin Holdings: directly (8.26%); through Hanshin Electric Railway (11.78%); Takashimaya cross ownership (5%)
- Number of employees: 5,693 (consolidated, 2012)
- Parent: Hankyu Hanshin Toho Group
- Subsidiaries: Hankyu Hanshin Department Stores, Inc. Hanshoku Co., Ltd. Persona Co., Ltd.
- Website: www.h2o-retailing.co.jp (en)

Hankyu Hanshin Department Stores, Inc.
- Native name: 株式会社阪急阪神百貨店
- Romanized name: Kabushiki gaisha Hankyū Hanshin Hyakkaten
- Type: Subsidiary
- Industry: Retail
- Predecessor: Hankyu Department Stores, Inc. (present H_{2}O Retailing Corporation); The Hanshin Department Store, Ltd.
- Founded: Osaka, Japan (October 1, 2007), Hankyu Department Stores, Inc.; took over the department store business from Hankyu Department Stores, inc. (first)
- Headquarters: Hankyu Department Store Umeda Main Store; 8-7, Kakudacho, Kita-ku, Osaka, Japan; Registered office Osaka Umeda Twin Towers South; 13-1, Umeda 1-chōme, Kita-ku, Osaka, Japan; Corporate headquarters
- Number of locations: 11 in Japan (Hankyu); 4 in Japan (Hanshin)
- Parent: H_{2}O Retailing Corporation
- Website: hankyu-hanshin-dept.co.jp

H_{2}O Retailing Corporation (エイチ・ツー・オー リテイリング株式会社, Eichi Tsū Ō Riteiringu Kabushikigaisha) is a stock holding company which is a member company of Hankyu Hanshin Toho Group. This article covers about Hankyu Hanshin Department Stores, Inc. (株式会社阪急阪神百貨店, Kabushikigaisha Hankyū Hanshin Hyakkaten) a subsidiary which owns 2 department store chains: Hankyu Department Store and Hanshin Department Store.

== History ==
- March 7, 1947: The department store business was separated from Keihanshin Kyuko Railway Company (present: Hankyu Hanshin Holdings, Inc.) and Hankyu Department Stores, Inc. was founded.
- October 1, 2007: "Hankyu Department Stores, Inc." subsidiarized "the Hanshin Department Store, Ltd." and was renamed "H_{2}O Retailing Corporation". The department store business was separated to the newly founded company, "Hankyu Department Stores, Inc."
- October 1, 2008: Hankyu Department Stores, Inc. consolidated the Hanshin Department Store, Ltd. and was renamed "Hankyu Hanshin Department Stores, Inc."

== See also ==
- Hankyu Hanshin Toho Group
  - H_{2}O Retailing Corporation
    - Hankyu Hanshin Department Stores, Inc.
      - Hankyu Department Store
      - Hanshin Department Store
  - Hankyu Railway
  - Hanshin Electric Railway
