= Asai (surname) =

Asai is a Japanese surname which means "shallow well". Notable people with the surname include:

- Akihiro Asai (浅井 亮博, born 1975), Japanese race car driver
- Asai Chū (浅井 忠, 1856–1907), Japanese painter
- Eriko Asai (浅井 えり子, born 1959), Japanese long-distance runner
- Hiroshi Asai (麻井 寛史, born 1978), Japanese arranger, musician and composer
- Isao Asai (浅井 功, born 1942), Japanese ice hockey player
- Itsuki Asai (浅井 樹, born 1971), Japanese baseball player
- Katsuaki Asai (born 1942), high-ranking teacher of Aikido in Germany
- Kiyomi Asai (浅井 清己, born 1974), Japanese voice actress
- Makate Asai (朝井 まかて, born 1959), Japanese writer
- Asai Ryōi (浅井 了意, c. 1612–1691), Japanese writer
- Tetsuhiko Asai (浅井 哲彦, 1935–2006), Shotokan karate master
- Yasuhiro Asai (浅井 康宏, born 1983), Japanese lacquer artisan
- Yoshihiro Asai (浅井 嘉浩, born 1966), Japanese professional masked wrestler wrestling under the name Ultimo Dragon
- Yoshiko Asai (浅井 淑子, born 1941), Japanese voice actress

== Fictional Characters ==
- Ami Asai (亜細亜実), a character in the manga series Uzaki-chan Wants to Hang Out!
  - Akihiko Asai, Ami's father

== See also ==
- Azai clan
