= Hankyu Hanshin Holdings =

Japanese holding company

Hankyu Hanshin Holdings, Inc.
- Native name: 阪急阪神ホールディングス株式会社
- Formerly: "Old" Hankyu Corporation (1973-2005); Hankyu Holdings, Inc. (2005-2006)
- Type: Public KK
- Traded as: TYO: 9042
- Industry: Ground transport
- Founded: Osaka, Japan (October 19, 1907, Mino-o Arima Electric Railway Company)
- Founder: Ichizō Kobayashi
- Headquarters: Ikeda Station; Sakaemachi Itchome, Ikeda, Osaka, Japan; Registered office Shibata Itchome, Kita-ku, Osaka, Japan; Corporate headquarters
- Area served: Japan
- Key people: Shimada Yasuo (president and representative director)
- Services: Rail services; Bus services; Hotels; Sports; Retailing; Tourism
- Revenue: ▼¥638,770 million (consolidated, March 2011)
- Operating income: ▼¥64,743 million (consolidated, March 2011)
- Net income: ▲¥18,068 million (consolidated, March 2011)
- Total assets: ▼¥2,314,669 million (consolidated, March 2011)
- Total equity: ▲¥486,947 million (consolidated, March 2011)
- Number of employees: 2,353
- Subsidiaries: Hankyu Corporation; Hanshin Electric Railway; Hankyu Hanshin Express Holdings Corporation; Hankyu Hanshin Hotels Company, Ltd.
- Website: www.hankyu-hanshin.co.jp/en/

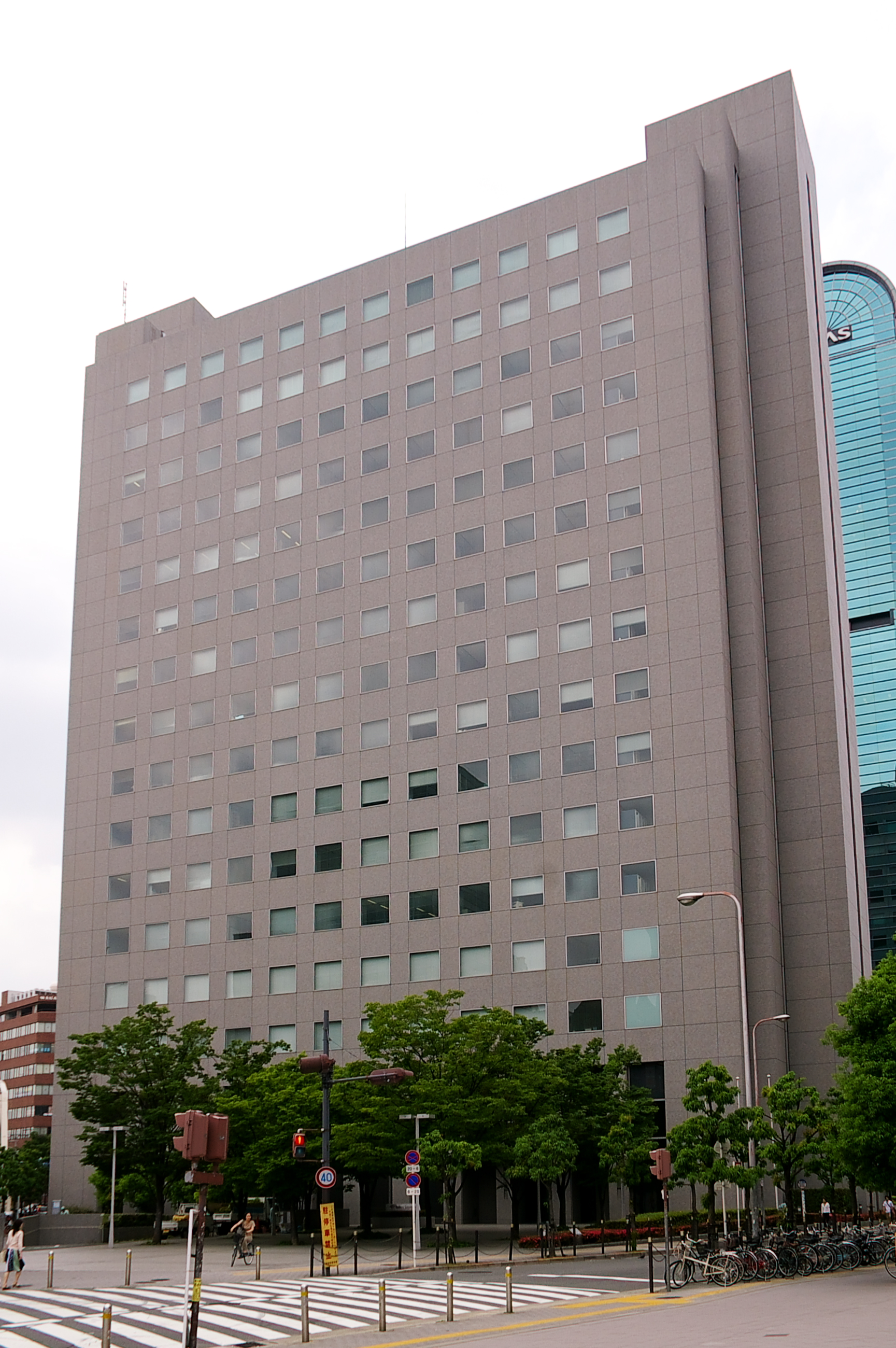
The head office of Hankyu Hanshin Holdings in Kita-ku, Osaka

Hankyu Hanshin Holdings, Inc. (阪急阪神ホールディングス株式会社, Hankyū Hanshin Hōrudingusu Kabushiki-gaisha) is a Japanese multinational keiretsu holding company which owns Hankyu Corporation, the Hanshin Electric Railway Co., Ltd., Toho Co., Ltd., and affiliate companies.

On October 1, 2006, Hankyu Holdings changed its name to the present corporate name following the merger with Hanshin Electric Railway. On the same day Hankyu Corporation Group was renamed Hankyu Hanshin Holdings Group, and the Hankyu Toho Group renamed Hankyu Hanshin Toho Group.

The operations of the company are centered on transportation, retailing, real estate, entertainment and media.

The transportation segment is the company's main cashflow generating business and comprises the railway companies Hanshin Electric Railway (acquired in 2006) and Hankyu Railway. It also includes the smaller railway lines of Nose Electric Railway as well as equity stakes in Kita-Osaka Kyūkō Railway, Sanyo Electric Railway, Osaka Monorail and Kobe Electric Railway. It also owned Hokushin Kyūkō Electric Railway until it was acquired by Kobe Municipal Transportation Bureau on 1 June 2020. The company also owns various taxi and bus franchises.

Hankyu and Hanshin also both had air cargo and express freight subsidiaries, which were combined in the Hankyu Hanshin Express Holdings company.

The retailing business is mainly concentrated in the company's large shareholding of H_{2}O Retailing, the company formed via the merger of the Hankyu and Hanshin Department Store companies.

The company owns and operates many hotels, and is developing real estate projects mainly on land along its railway lines through its subsidiary Hankyu Realty, which was previously separately listed, but fully acquired through a stock swap in 2002. It has spun off some of its vast real estate holdings (such as the HEP Five building) into a REIT company, Hankyu Hanshin Properties.

The group is a major shareholder in Toho, which next to its many media interests (movie development and distribution, as well as a large stake in Fuji Media Holdings) has large real estate interests. Other companies in the entertainment area include the professional baseball team Hanshin Tigers and the Takarazuka Revue all-female theatre group, and stakes in Kansai TV and FM Osaka, as well as tourism operations (e.g. Hankyu Travel).

== Major shareholders ==
(As of August 2009)

Japan Trustee Services Bank, various accounts	11.06%
Nippon Life Insurance	3.35%
The Master Trust Bank of Japan	3.00%
Sumitomo Mitsui Banking Corporation	2.43%
H_{2}O Retailing	1.60%
Mitsubishi UFJ Financial Group	0.88%
Takenaka Corporation	0.73%

In 2006, the activist Fund Privee Zurich Turnaround Group run by Kenzo Matsumara (which later assumed the name Privee Investment Holding, was then acquired by e-Revolution co. Ltd. and now renamed Privee Fund Group) took a major stake in Hankyu Holdings, hoping to boost efficiencies in the very diverse holdings of the Hankyu-Toho group. However, the takeover of Hanshin Electric Railway by Hankyu in the wake of the affair surrounding Fund Manager Yoshiaki Murakami and the establishment by Hankyu management of anti-takeover measures, as well as the 2008 financial crisis resulted in Privee reducing its stake in the company in 2008.

== Listed companies in which Hankyu Hanshin Holdings directly holds a stake ==
- Kobe Electric Railway, first section of the Osaka Securities Exchange, 9046, 27.7% stake
- Sanyo Electric Railway, first section of the Osaka Securities Exchange 9052, 17.38% stake
- OS Company, Ltd., second section of the Osaka Securities Exchange 9637, 22% stake
- H_{2}O Retailing, first section of the Tokyo Stock Exchange and Osaka Securities Exchange 8242, 21.8% stake
- Tokyo Rakutenchi Company, Ltd., first section of the Tokyo Stock Exchange 8842, 17.8% stake
- Hankyu REIT, first section of the Tokyo Stock Exchange 8977, 4.1% stake
- Toho Co, Ltd., first section of the Tokyo Stock Exchange and Osaka Securities Exchange, Fukuoka Stock Exchange 9602, 20.15% stake

== Sports franchises ==
Hankyu once owned a professional baseball team in Japan known as the Hankyu Braves. In 1988, the team was sold to Orient Leasing Co. (which changed its name to Orix in 1989) and the team name became the Orix BlueWave and later the Orix Buffaloes. The Hankyu Braves were sold by then-president of Hankyu, Kohei Kobayashi, to finance the redevelopment of Umeda Station and Nishinomiya-Kitaguchi Station. By acquiring Hanshin Electric Railway, Hankyu-Hanshin Holdings became the owner of the baseball team Hanshin Tigers.
