= Hanshin Department Store =

Department store in Japan

The Hanshin Department Store, Ltd.
- Native name: 株式会社阪神百貨店
- Company type: Public Kabushiki gaisha
- Industry: Retail
- Predecessor: Hanshin Electric Railway Co., Ltd.
- Founded: Umeda, Osaka, Japan (June 30, 1947)
- Defunct: October 1, 2008
- Fate: Merged
- Successor: Hankyu Hanshin Department Stores, Inc.
- Headquarters: 13-13, Umeda 1-chome, Kita-ku, Osaka, Japan

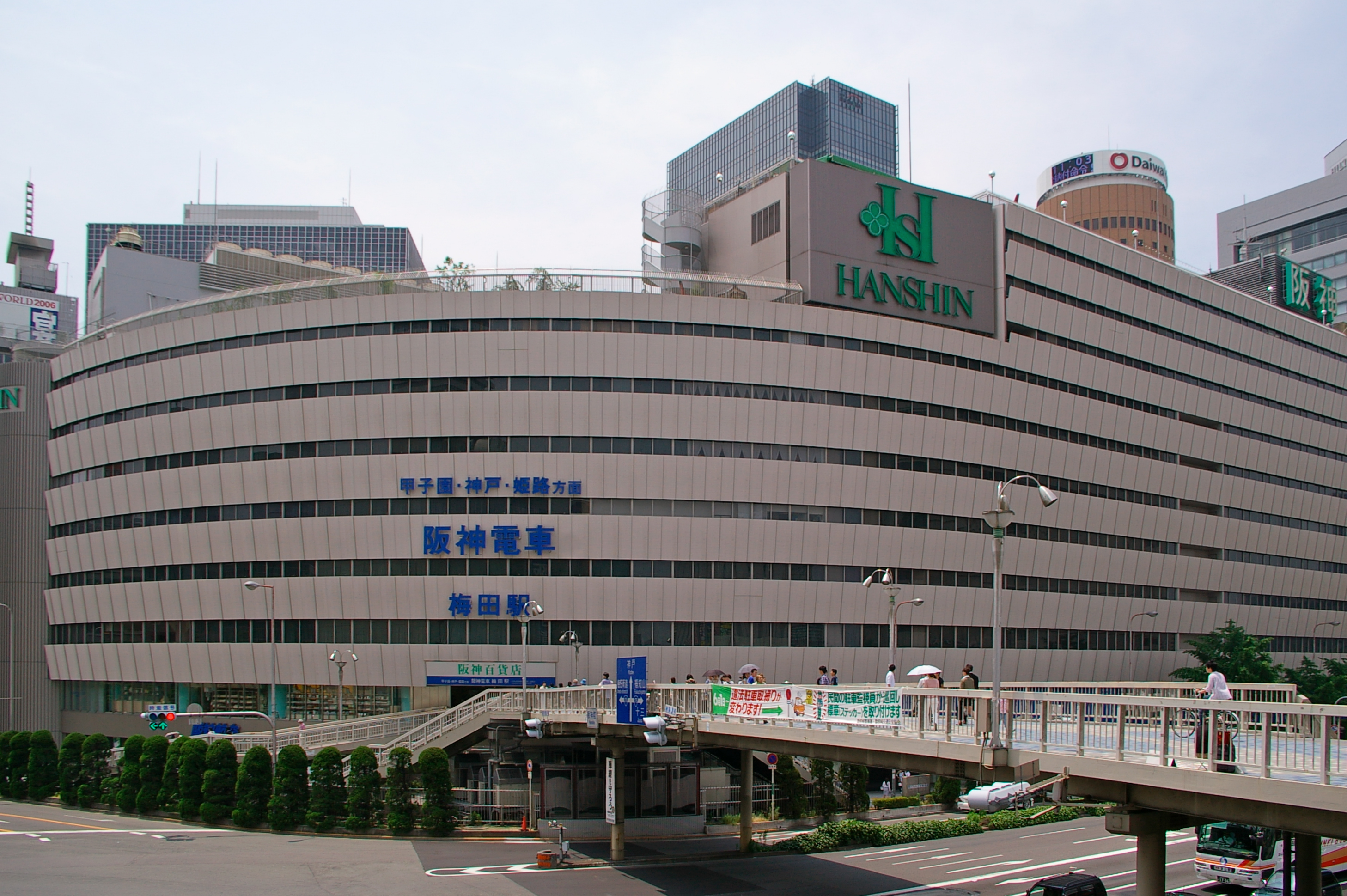
The head store of Hanshin Department Store in Umeda, Kita-ku, Osaka

Hanshin Department Store (阪神百貨店, Hanshin Hyakkaten) is a Japanese department store chain owned by Hankyu Hanshin Department Stores, Incorporated (株式会社阪急阪神百貨店, Kabushiki-gaisha Hankyū Hanshin Hyakkaten), a subsidiary of H_{2}O Retailing Corporation.

== Stores ==
Hanshin Umeda Main Store
- 13-13, Umeda Itchome, Kita-ku, Osaka, Japan
- Access

- Hanshin Electric Railway Main Line: Umeda Station
- JR West: Osaka Station and Kitashinchi Station
- Osaka Municipal Subway
  Midosuji Line: Umeda Station
  Yotsubashi Line: Nishi-Umeda Station
  Tanimachi Line: Higashi-Umeda Station

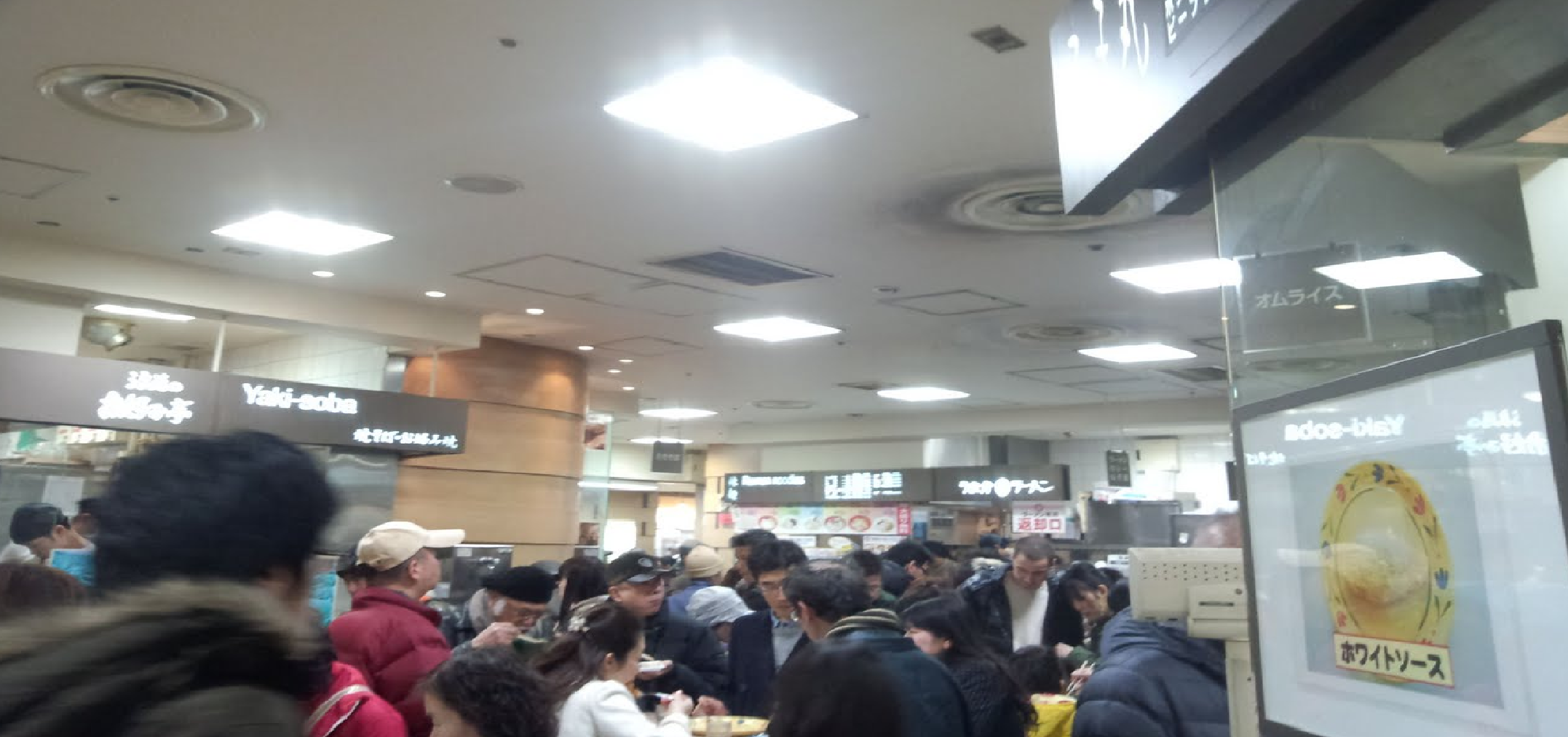
Snack Park

- Others

- Snack Park (スナックパーク) is in the first basement.
- Hanshin Tigers Shop (阪神タイガースショップ) is in the 8th floor.

Hanshin Mikage
- Mikage Classe, 2-1, Mikage-Nakamachi Sanchome, Higashinada-ku, Kōbe, Japan
- Access: Hanshin Electric Railway Main Line: Mikage Station

Hanshin Nishinomiya
- Ebista Nishinomiya in 1-26, Tanakacho, Nishinomiya, Hyōgo Prefecture, Japan
- Access: Hanshin Electric Railway Main Line: Nishinomiya Station

Amagasaki Hanshin
- Amagasaki Q's Mall (formerly COCOE), the place the factory of Kirin Brewery Co., Ltd. used to be.
- Access: JR West Amagasaki Station.

Kaohsiung Hanshin Department Store
- Kaohsiung, Taiwan

=== Former store ===
Kenmin Hyakkaten (former Kumamoto Hanshin)

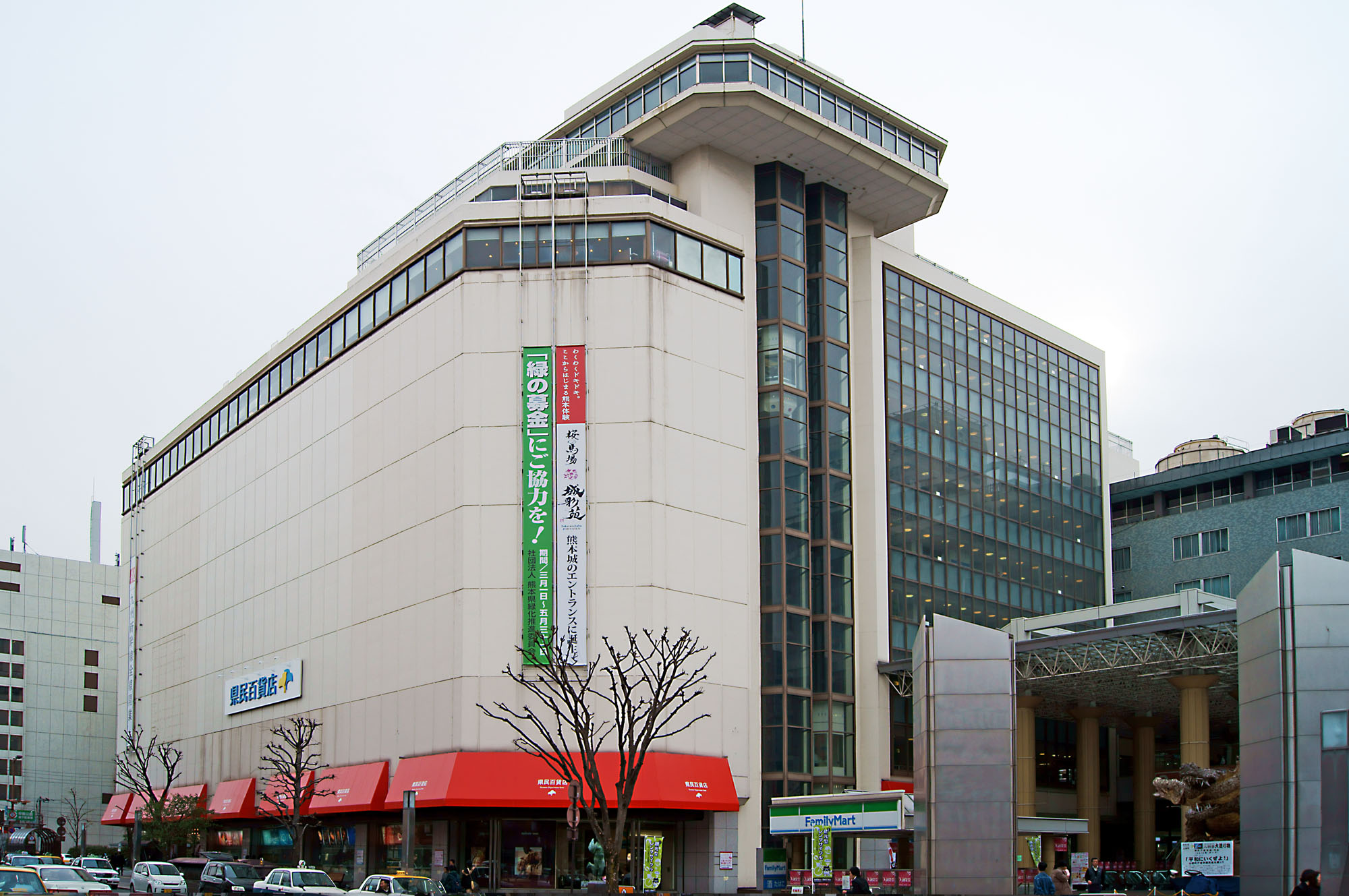
Kenmin Hyakkaten, March 2011

- 3-22, Sakuramachi, Chūō-ku, Kumamoto, see Kumamoto Bus Terminal

On February 23, 2011, Kumamoto Hanshin was renamed Kenmin Hyakkaten (県民百貨店, Kenmin Hyakkaten). The store was closed on February 28, 2015, due to the redevelopment of Kumamoto Bus Terminal.

- Sannomiya

== See also ==
- Hankyu Department Store - one of two names of the department stores owned by Hankyu Hanshin Department Stores, Inc.
