= Hankyu Department Store =

Japanese department store chain

Hankyu
- Type: Retail

Hankyu Department Store (阪急百貨店, Hankyū Hyakkaten) is a Japanese department store chain owned by Hankyu Hanshin Department Stores, Incorporated (株式会社阪急阪神百貨店, Kabushiki-gaisha Hankyū Hanshin Hyakkaten), a subsidiary of H_{2}O Retailing Corporation.

== History ==
Hankyu traces its roots to the Umeda branch of Shirokiya, a Tokyo-based department store, which opened in Osaka in November 1920, occupying the first floor of the five-story Hankyu Umeda Building. Hankyu operated a cafeteria on the second floor. Hankyu founder Ichizo Kobayashi terminated Hankyu's contract with Shirokiya in 1925, creating a Hankyu-branded supermarket on the second and third floors of the building, and a cafeteria on the fourth and fifth floors.

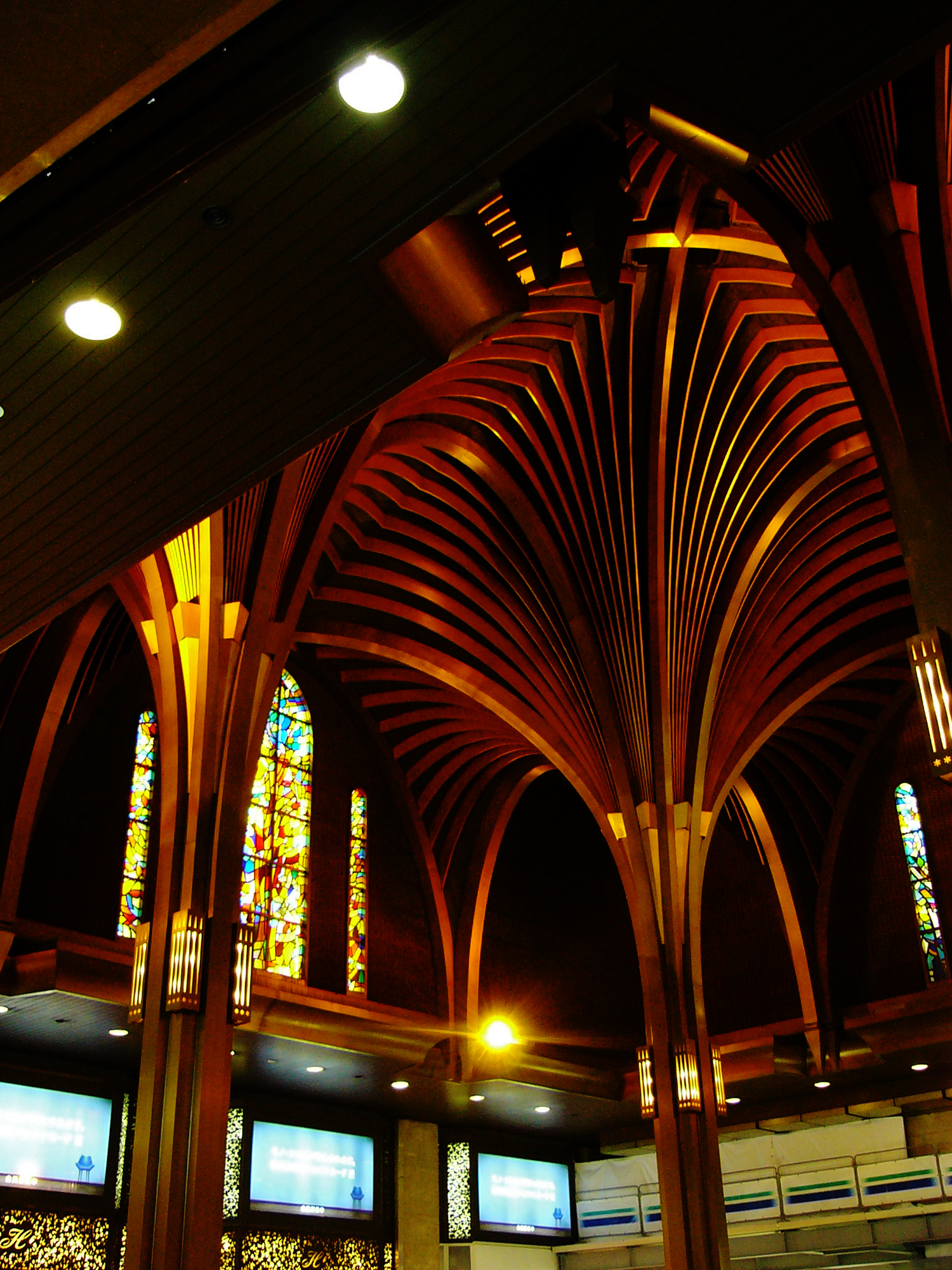
The "Baroque Dome" on the ground floor concourse of the original Hankyu Department Store in Umeda (1929-2005).

In 1929, the building was rebuilt with eight stories and two basement levels, and the first Hankyu Department store opened that April. This was the second railway terminal department store in the world, after the Mikasaya Department Store that opened at Uehommachi Station in 1926. The model was later replicated by other private railway companies in Japan.

Hankyu opened a network of thirty-eight smaller retail outlets in the Osaka suburbs in 1937, using the Hankyu Railway network to relay orders and deliver goods from the main store in Umeda.

After World War II, Hankyu expanded into the Kanto region, opening stores in Oimachi in 1953, Ginza in 1956, and Yurakucho in 1984. It expanded and renovated its main Umeda store in the 1950s and 1960s, and opened department stores in the Kansai suburbs in the 1970s and 1980s.

Hankyu once operated in Malaysia in the 1980s as Hankyu Jaya, established in March 1984 as Hankyu Jaya Holdings Berhad. Its initial subsidiaries were Hankyu Jaya Shopping Centre Sdn Bhd, Hankyu Jaya Shopping Centre (Kedah) Sdn Bhd; Hankyu Jaya Holdings later added two new subsidiaries – Hankyu Jaya Ampang Park and Hankyu Jaya Shopping Centre (Kelantan) Sdn Bhd – in July 1986. Locally owned company, Mun Loong Berhad, acquired 49% stakes of Hankyu Jaya Shopping Centre and Hankyu Jaya Ampang Park in 1989. Due to Hankyu Jaya's low-margin operations, Mun Loong received only 20% profit. Meanwhile, Mun Loong planned to open two new Hankyu Jaya outlets by the end of 1990; one of them located in the Klang Valley, and renovate its existing stores to meet demands and changing tastes of consumers.

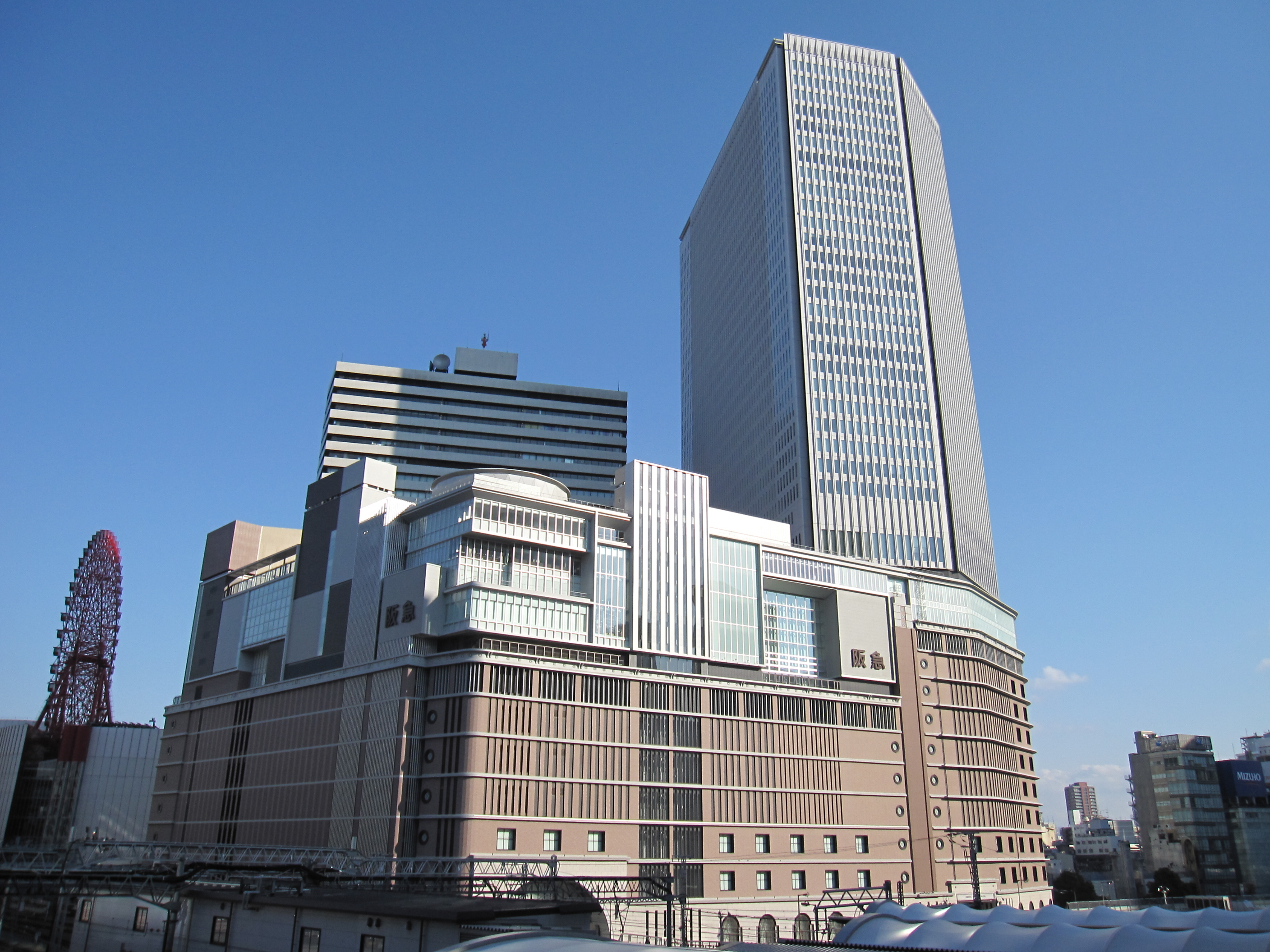
The rebuilt Hankyu Department Store in Umeda (2009-)

Hankyu's flagship Umeda location was rebuilt as an office tower complex between 2005 and 2009.

Hankyu began an alliance with Uni-President Department Stores of Taiwan in 2006, opening co-branded locations in Kaohsiung in 2007 and Taipei in 2010. The co-branding program ended in 2016 and both stores were changed to the Uni-President brand.

In 2007, Hankyu reorganized its department store business under a new holding company, H2O Holdings. In 2008, the Hankyu Department Store company was combined with Hanshin Department Store, although the brands and operations remained separate.

== Locations ==
Most Hankyu department stores are in the Kansai region. Hankyu is also present in the Greater Tokyo Area and Fukuoka.

- Umeda (Osaka)
- Kobe
- Takatsuki
- Senri
- Nishinomiya
- Kawanishi
- Takarazuka
- Hakata (Fukuoka)
- Hankyu Men's Tokyo (former Hankyu Yurakucho)
- Tsuzuki (Yokohama)
- Oi (Tokyo) (food hall)
Senri Store

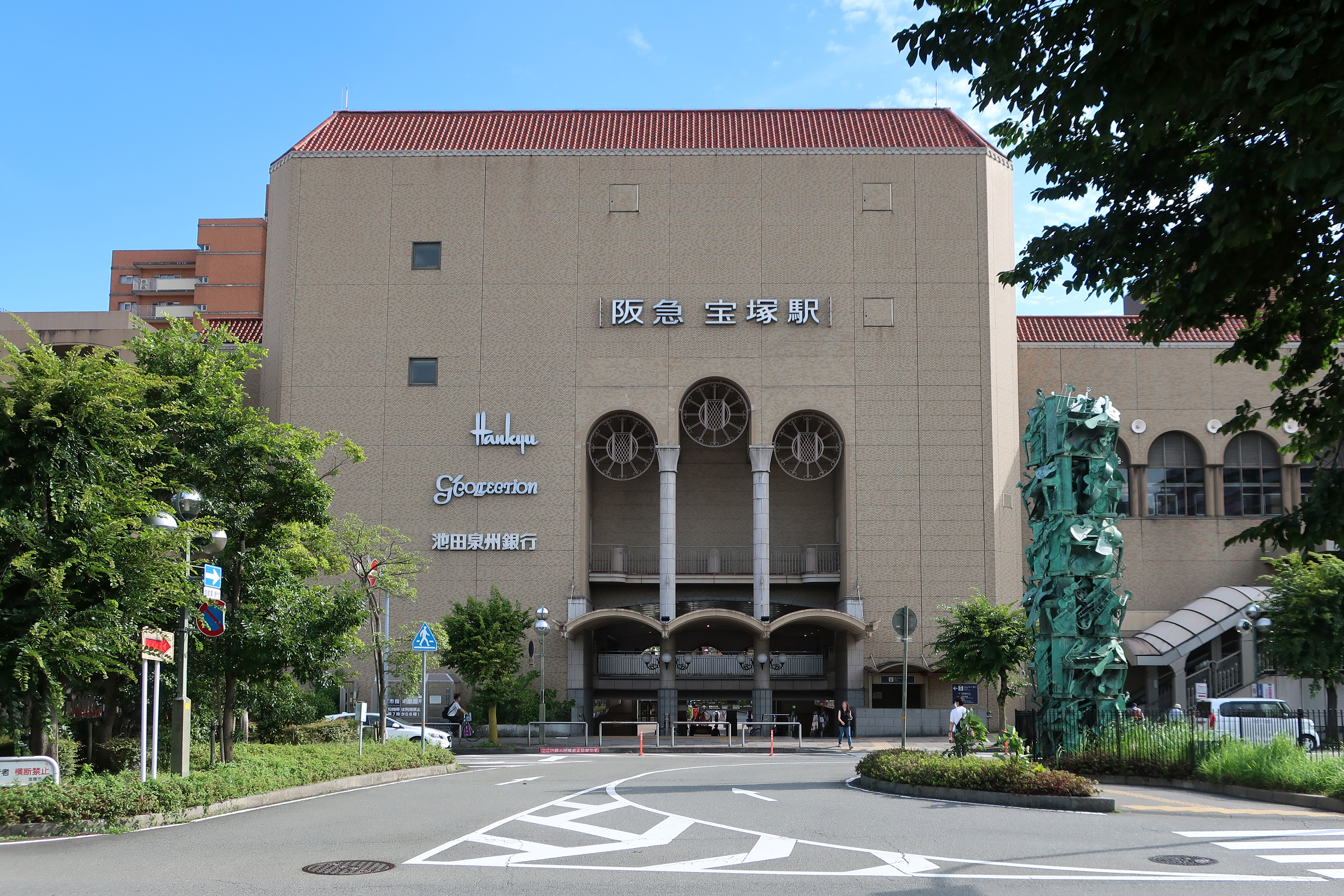
Takarazuka Store (inside Takarazuka Station)

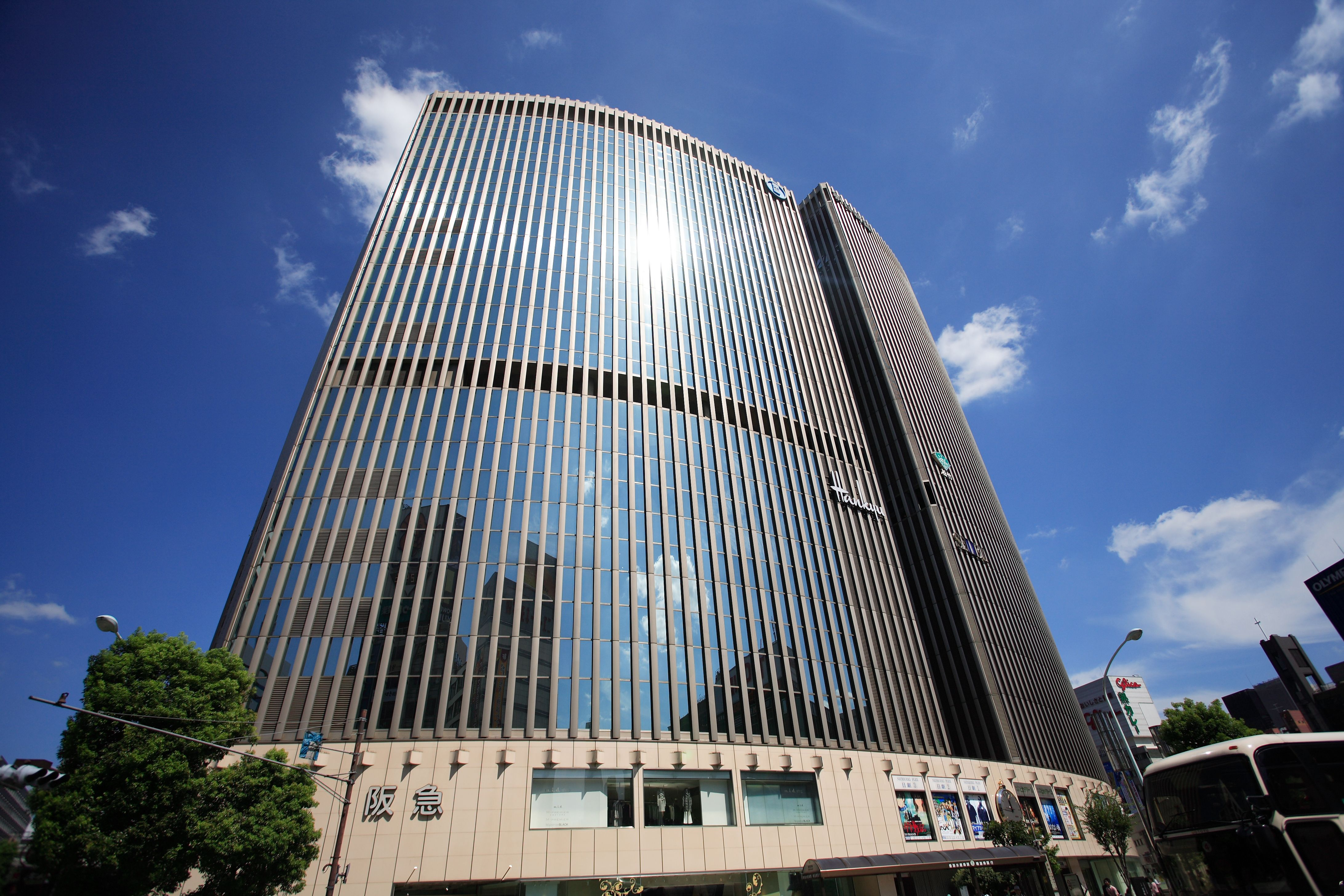
Hankyu Men's Tokyo (former Yurakucho Store)

Oi Food Hall (in Hankyu Oimachi Garden)
