= Mitsui (disambiguation) =

Mitsui is the name of a large Japanese conglomerate, Mitsui Group.

Mitsui may also refer to:

== Companies ==
- Mitsui & Co., a Japanese general trading company, part of the Mitsui Group
- Mitsui O.S.K. Lines, a shipping company
- Mitsui Chemicals
- Mitsui Fudosan, property firm
- Mitsui Rail Capital (MRCE), a railway leasing company
- Mitsui Oil Exploration
- Mitsui E&S
- Kinkisharyo-Mitsui, public transit vehicle manufacturer
- Mitsui Babcock, engineering (boilers) company, now part of Doosan Babcock

== Other uses ==
- Mitsui (surname)
- Mitsui family, article about the family of industrialist and merchants
- Mitsui Golden Glove Award
- Mitsui Hisashi, character in the "Slam Dunk" anime manga series
- Mitsui Memorial Museum
- Mitsui 56-series, a large series of ships built by Mitsui Engineering & Shipbuilding
