= Matsuya (department store) =

Department store in Tokyo, Japan

MATSUYA Co., Ltd. 株式会社松屋
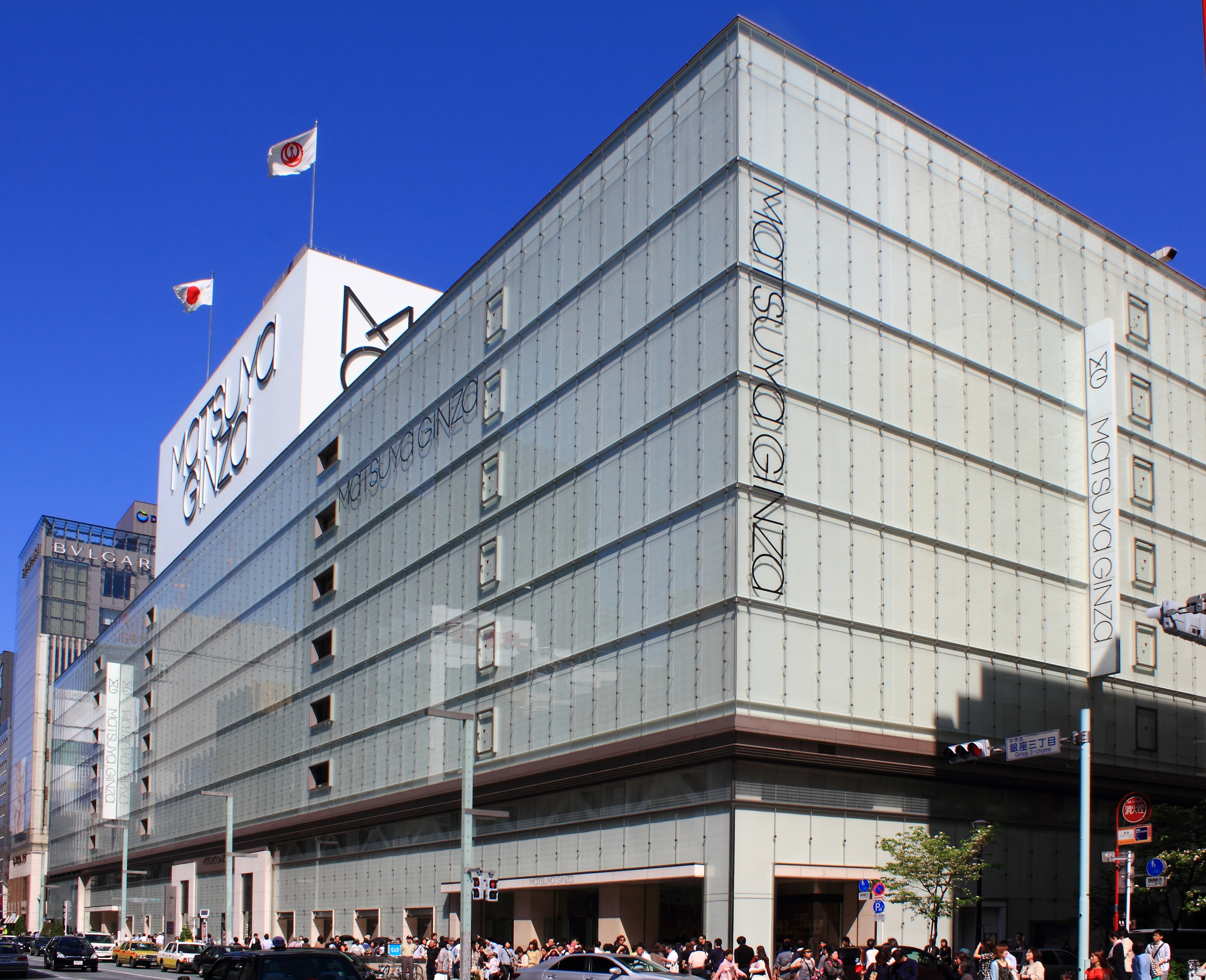
- Matsuya Ginza in 2012
- Industry: Retail
- Founder: Tokube Furuya
- Parent: MUFG Bank (4.67%); Tobu Railway (4.54%); Tobu Shared Service (4.41%); Yamanashi Chuo Bank (0.67%); Kikkoman (0.62%); Fuji Kyuko (0.37%); Yomeishu Seizo (0.29%); Kitano Construction (0.16%); Seiyoken (0.13%); Toei Company (0.06%)
- Website: www.matsuya.com

Matsuya Co., Ltd. (株式会社松屋) TYO: 8237 is a Japanese department store in Tokyo. Founded in 1869, it has stores in Ginza (est. 1925) and Asakusa (est. 1930s). The Ginza branch is the company's headquarters.

Arising from the Meiji Restoration, the company was founded in 1869 in Yokohama as Tsuruya, a store selling cotton for kimono. In 1889, it bought Imagawa Matsuya, a Tokyo kimono fabric store founded in 1776, and adopted the latter's name because of its historic lineage. It opened a three-story Western-style store in 1907, and a modern department store in 1925 in Ginza.

In the 1960s, the Ginza branch held two well-regarded art exhibitions: "From Space to Environment" and "Good Design".

In 1971, Matsuya began a loose partnership / cooperation agreement with Isetan, another Japanese department store. In 2002, Matsuya purchased Isetan stock in an attempt to cement the relationship. However, the two firms grew apart in 2007 after Isetan agreed to merge with Matsuya's bitter rival Mitsukoshi, which also operates a flagship department store in Ginza, and form Isetan Mitsukoshi Holdings.

On 27 September 2012, Asakusa-Matsuya was renewed as "EKIMISE" and exteriors were changed to the former Asakusa-Matsuya which was opened in 1931 because Tokyo Skytree was opened.

In April 2019, Matsuya held a promotion to celebrate the announcement of the new imperial era name, Rei-wa, providing special treatment for customers whose names contained either of the Chinese characters rei or wa.

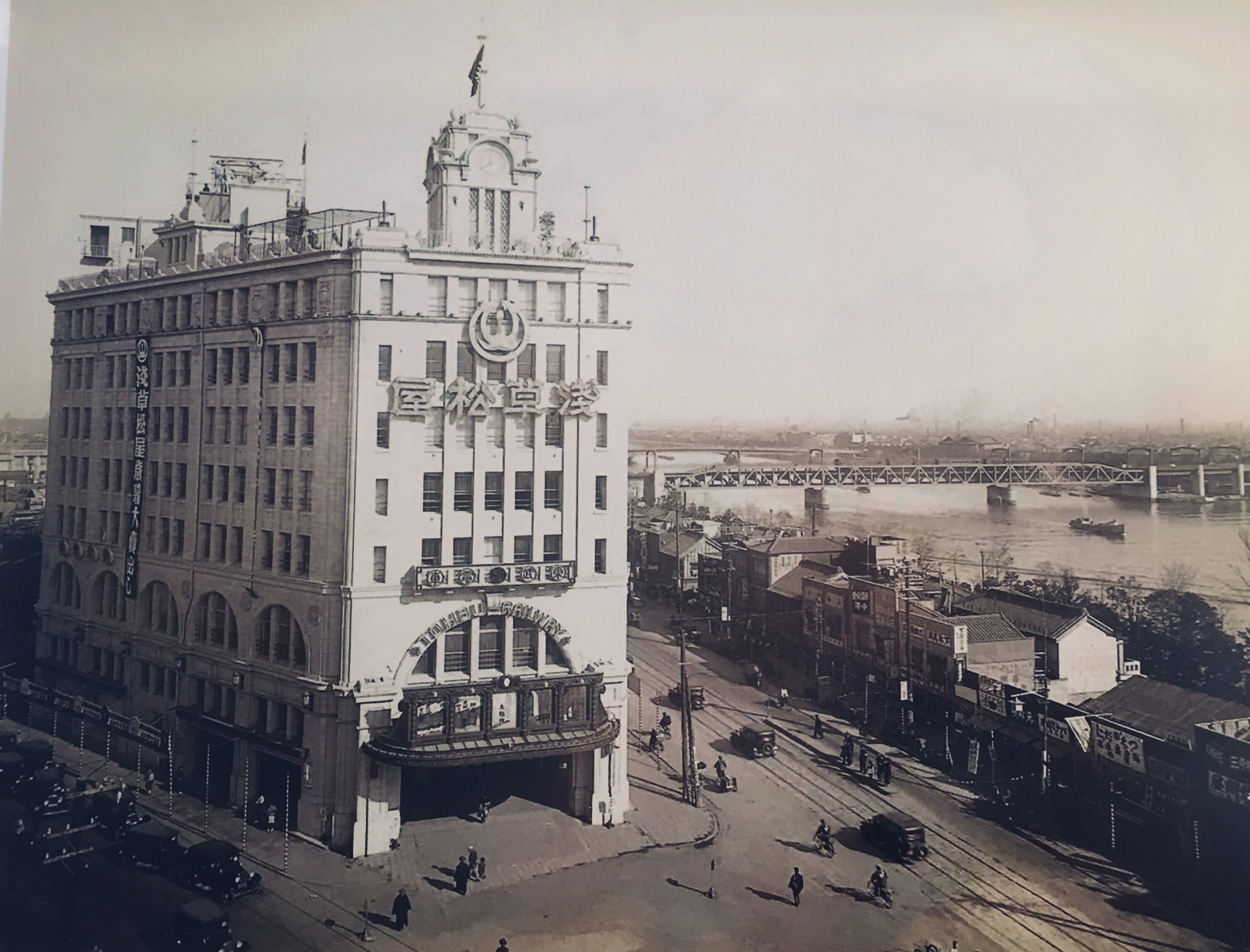
Asakusa branch in 1931, with the Sumida River on the right

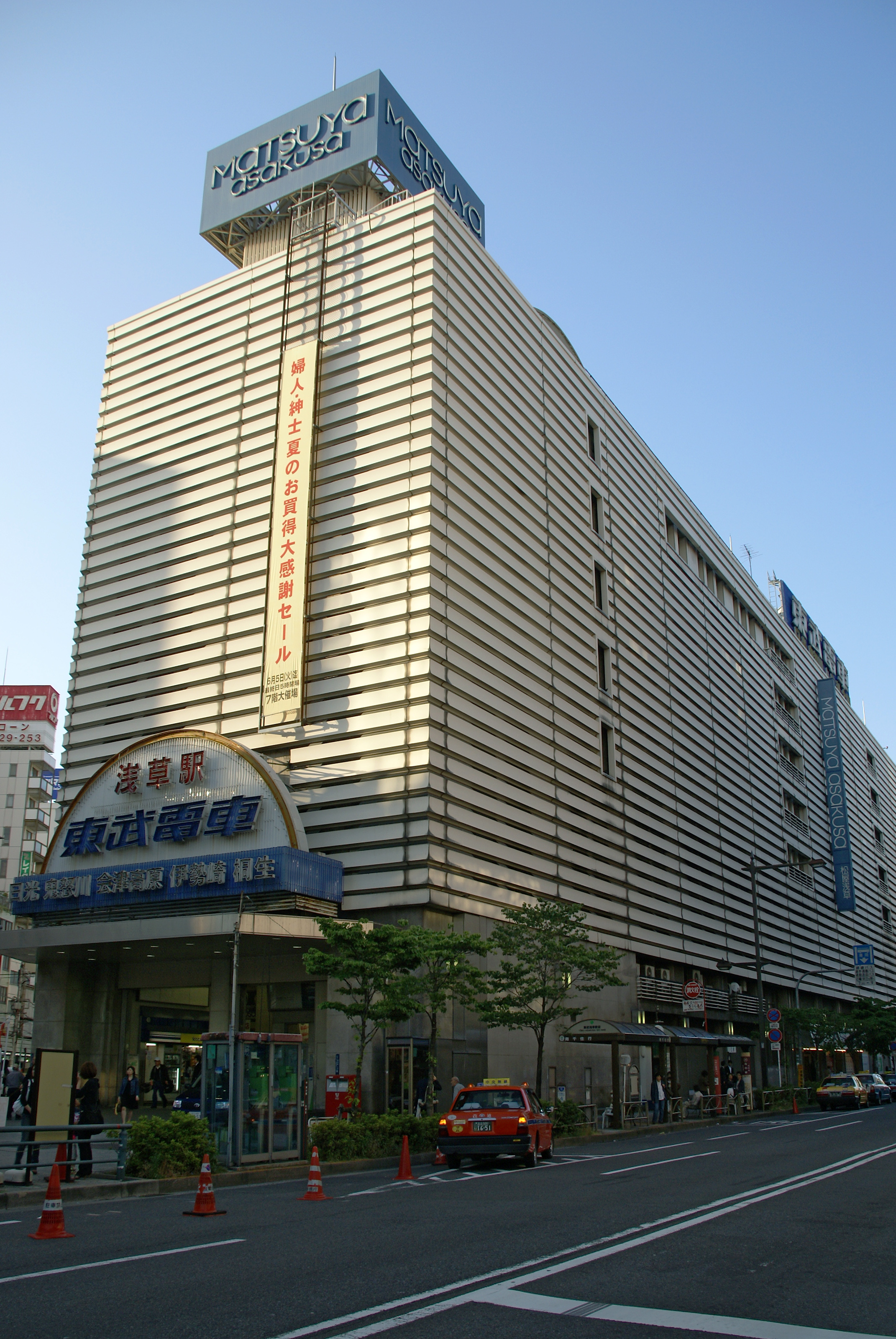
Before Asakusa-Matsuya was renewed

Ginza Tokyo 2024

== See also ==
- Isetan
- Mitsukoshi
- Tobu Department Store
- Fujikyu (Fujikyu's shares of 0.38% were held by Matsuya)
