= Mitsui Takatoshi =

Japanese businessman (1622–1694)

- 三井 高利
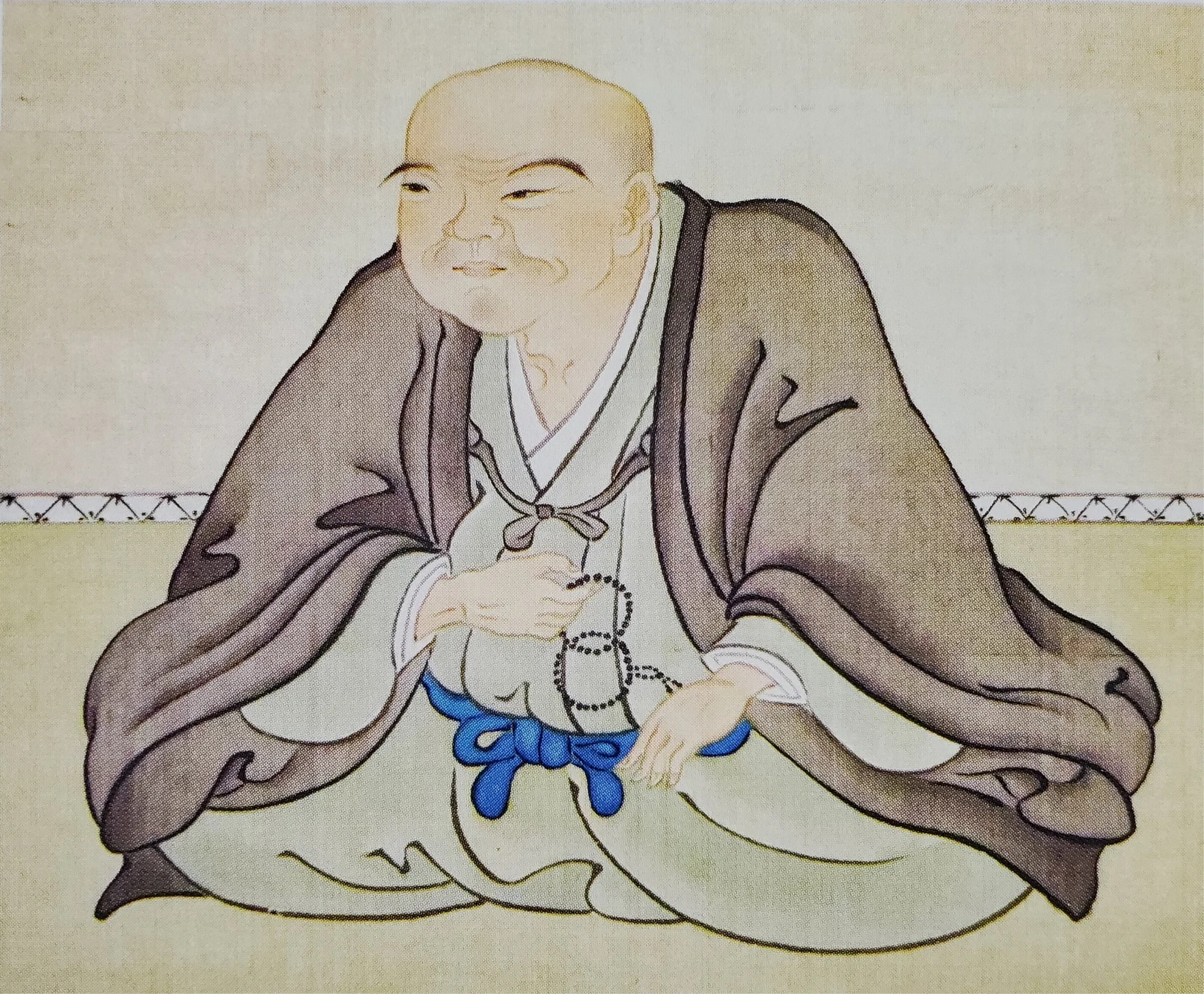
- Mitsui Takatoshi (circa before 1700)
- Born: 1622; Matsusaka, Ise Province (present-day Mie Prefecture)
- Died: May 29, 1694 (aged 71–72)
- Occupation: businessman
- Known for: Founded Mitsui family
- Children: 6
- Parent(s): Mitsui Takatoshi (father); Shuhō (mother)

Mitsui Takatoshi (三井 高利; 1622 – May 29, 1694) was a Japanese businessman who founded the Mitsui family of merchants and industrialists that later emerged as the Mitsui Group, a powerful zaibatsu (business conglomerate).

== Life ==
Mitsui was born in 1622, in Matsusaka, Ise Province (present-day Matsusaka, Mie Prefecture), the son of merchants Mitsui Takatoshi (三井 高俊) and Shuhō (殊法). He was the youngest of eight siblings; four brothers and four sisters. His grandfather was a samurai and governor of Echigo Province Mitsui Takayasu, who was later exiled to Matsusaka after being defeated by Oda Nobunaga. Mitsui's father Takatoshi abandoned his katana, thus renouncing his status as a samurai, and established himself as a sake and miso merchant and a pawnbroker. The business was named Lord Echigo's Sake (Echigo-dono no sakaya) to commemorate Takayasu's office. However, Mitsui's mother Shuhō, a skilled merchant, was practically in charge of the business as her husband was not very fond of trading. She grew the business by introducing many business methods that were ground breaking at the time, such as forfeited pawn and low-margin high-turnover. Mitsui, who later became a prosperous merchant, is said to have inherited his business skills mostly from his mother. The Mitsui family was a branch of Fujiwara Hok-ke.

He moved to Edo at 14 years of age, following his eldest brother Toshitsugu who had extended the family business by opening a kimono store (呉服屋, gofukuya) there in 1627. Takatoshi in a little over a decade rose to be manager of his brother's shop.

In 1649, his elder brother Shigetoshi died at the age of 36, and he returned to Matsusaka to look after his aging mother, remaining there for two decades. There, he married Nakagawa Kane, the eldest daughter of the Nakagawa merchant family; the two had ten sons and five daughters. He returned to Edo on his elder brother Toshigutsu's death in 1673. He then established the Echigoya Drapery in Nihonbashi the following year, which was to become, later, the head company of the famous Mitsukoshi retail shopping chain. He also set up a material supplies store in Kyoto at this time. In contrast to most drapery merchants, who catered to feudal houses and wealthy merchants, trading on credit with no fixed prices, Takatoshi introduced an innovatory system of cash based purchase based on fixed prices for wares and targeted consumers in the emerging middle class.

He subsequently started a money exchange in 1683, with a new system for inter-city loans. He extended the family business by opening an outlet in Osaka, and was appointed official purveyor of dry goods to the Tokugawa shogunate in 1687. He also relocated, in 1686, the headquarters of the family business from Matsusaka to Kyoto. He died at the age of 73.

Mitsui had six sons.

== Sources ==
- Horide, Ichirou (Spring 2000). "The House of Mitsui: Secrets of Its Longevity". Journal of Marketing Theory and Practice. 8 (2): 31–36. doi:10.1080/10696679.2000.11501866. JSTOR 40469991. S2CID 166312264.
- Yonekura, Seiichiro (December 1985). "The Emergence of the Prototype of Enterprise under Capitalism - The Case of Mitsui". Hitotsubashi Journal of Commerce and Management. 20 (1): 63–104. JSTOR 43294890.
- Mitsui, Takaharu (January 1942). "Das Familiengesetz des Hauses Mitsui". Monumenta Nipponica. 5 (1): 1–37. doi:10.2307/2382701. JSTOR 2382701.
- Horie, Yasuzo (April 1966). "The Role of the Ie IE (家—House) in the Economic Modernization of Japan". Kyoto University Economic Review. 36 (1): 1–16. JSTOR 43217134.
- Jansen, Marius B. (2002). The Making of Modern Japan. Harvard University Press. p. 172. ISBN 978-0-674-03910-0.
- Yonekura, Seiichiro; Shimizu, Hiroshi (2012). "Entrepreneurship in Pre-World War II Japan: The Role and Logic of the Zaibatsu". In Landes, David S.; Mokyr, Joel; Baumol, William J. (eds.). The Invention of Enterprise Entrepreneurship from Ancient Mesopotamia to Modern Times. Princeton University Press. pp. 501–526. ISBN 978-1-400-83358-0.
- Ozawa, Emiko (2016). "Mitsui Echigoya's Gift to the Tokugawa Shogunate". In Chaiklin, Martha (ed.). Mediated by Gifts Politics and Society in Japan, 1350-1850. Brill. pp. 166–198. ISBN 9789004336117.
