= Three Wells (disambiguation) =

Three Wells is an open-air museum in Ukraine.

'Three Wells may also refer to:

== Places ==
- Uchquduq, "Three Wells", a city in Uzbekistan
- Tres Pozos, "Three Wells", a town ion Argentina
- Drei Brunnen, "Three Wells", the source of the river Kaltenmühlbach, Germany
- Three Wells near Broomehill, the source of Gordon River (Western Australia)
- Three Wells, a settlement in Buerton, Cheshire East, England
- "The Three Wells", a sacred place in Kilmovee, Ireland
- Three Wells Round Cairn, a Scheduled Monument in Monmouthshire

== Other ==
- Mitsui (surname), a Japanese surname literally meaning "three wells"
- Three wells beneath the world tree Yggdrasil, see Urðarbrunnr
- Uchquduq - Three Wells, a song by Uzbek band Yalla

== See also ==
- "Three houses and three wells", the Three utilities problem
- Two Wells
