= Mitsui =

Japanese multinational corporate group (keiretsu)

Mitsui Group 三井グループ
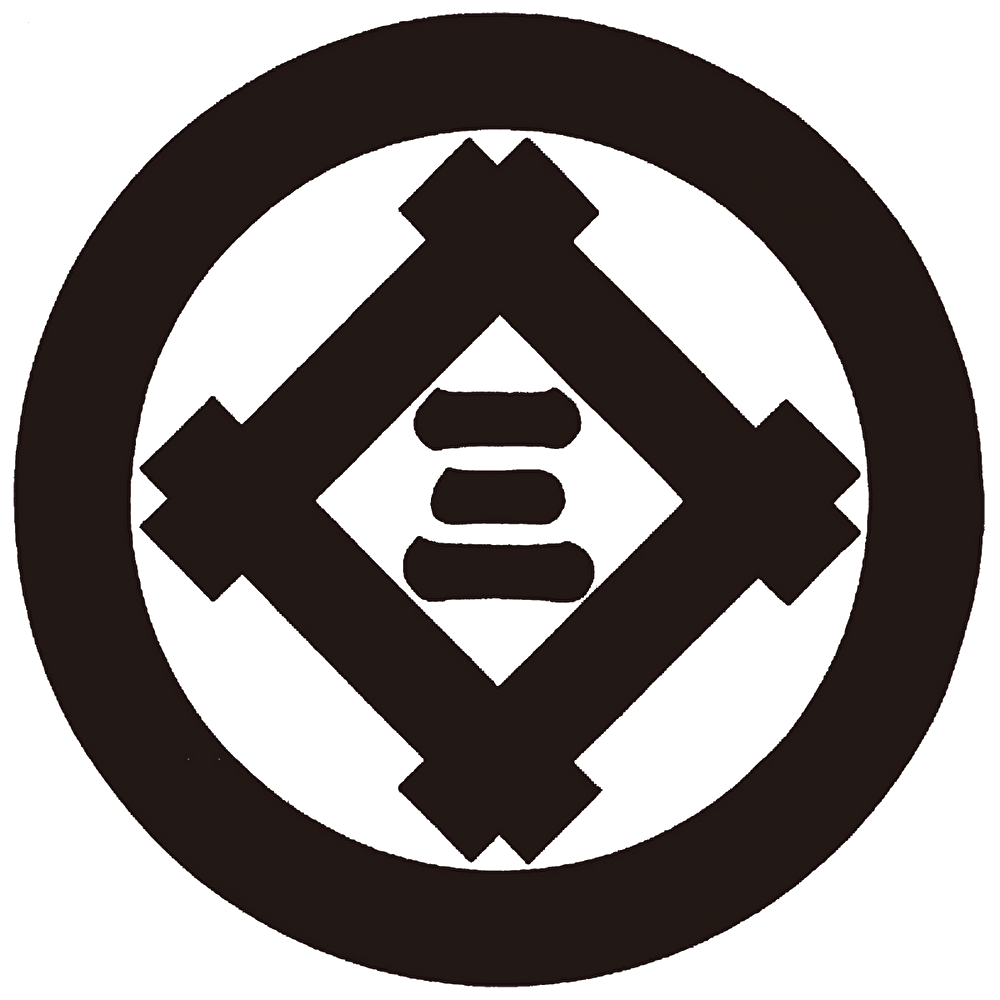

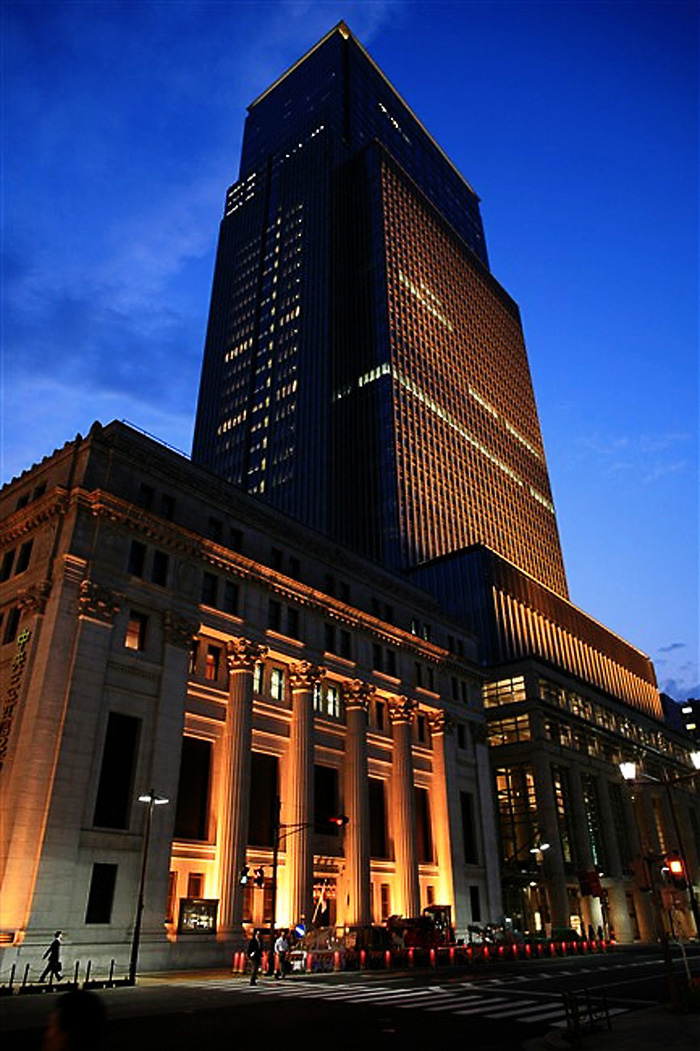
- Mitsui Main Building and Nihonbashi Mitsui Tower
- Type: Keiretsu
- Founded: 1673; 353 years ago (foundation of Mitsukoshi)
- Founder: Mitsui Takatoshi
- Headquarters: Japan
- Area served: Worldwide
- Products: Food and beverage, industrial products
- Services: Financial services, real estate, retail, shipping, and logistics
- Number of employees: 814,000
- Website: www.mitsui.com/jp/en/index.html

Mitsui Group (三井グループ, Mitsui Gurūpu) is a group of autonomous Japanese multinational companies.

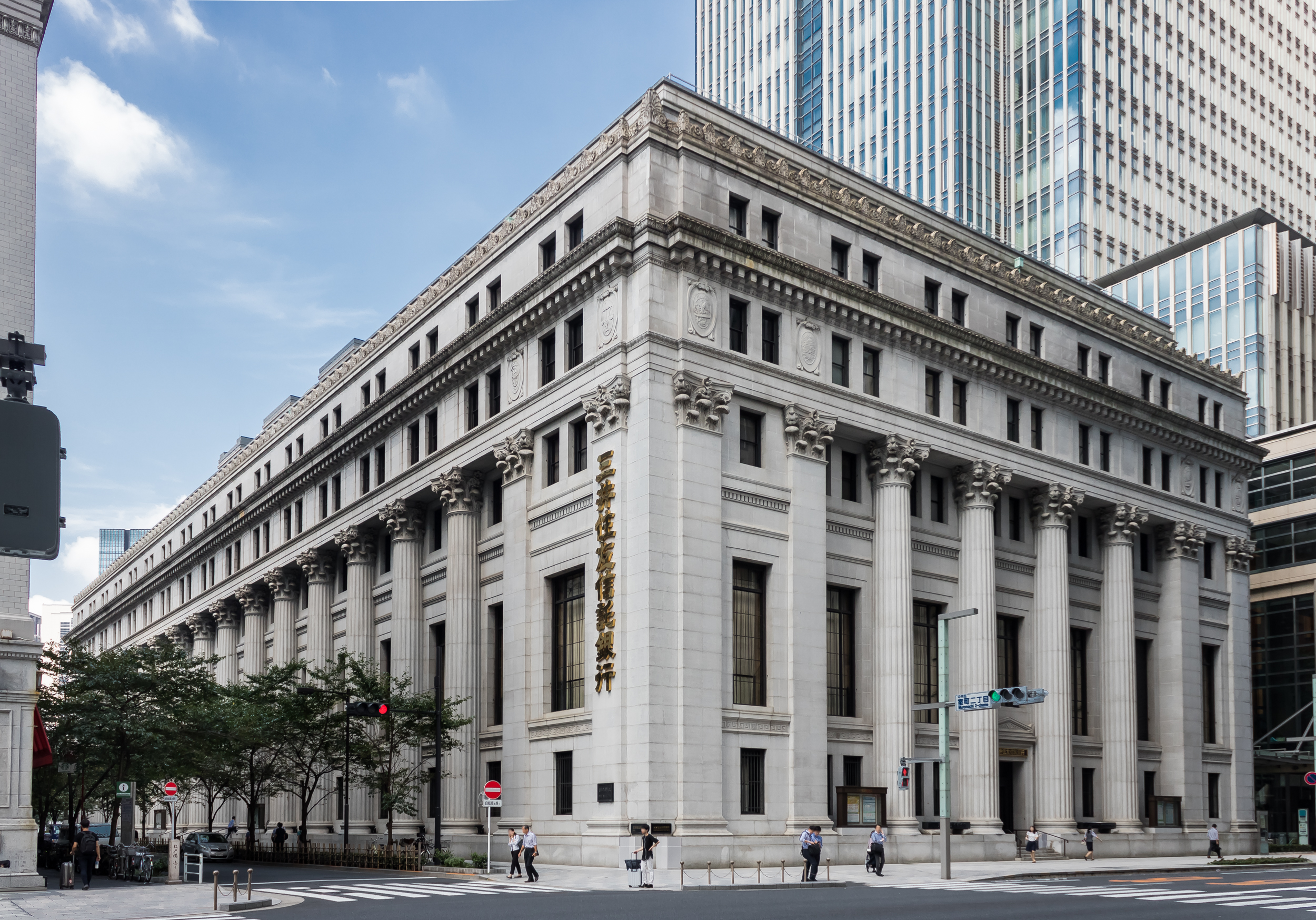
Mitsui main building

The major companies of the group include Mitsui & Co. (general trading company), Sumitomo Mitsui Banking Corporation, Nippon Paper Industries, Pokka Sapporo Holdings, Toray Industries, Mitsui Chemicals, Isetan Mitsukoshi Holdings, Sumitomo Mitsui Trust Holdings, Mitsui E&S, Mitsui OSK Lines and Mitsui Fudosan.

== History ==
=== Edo period origins ===
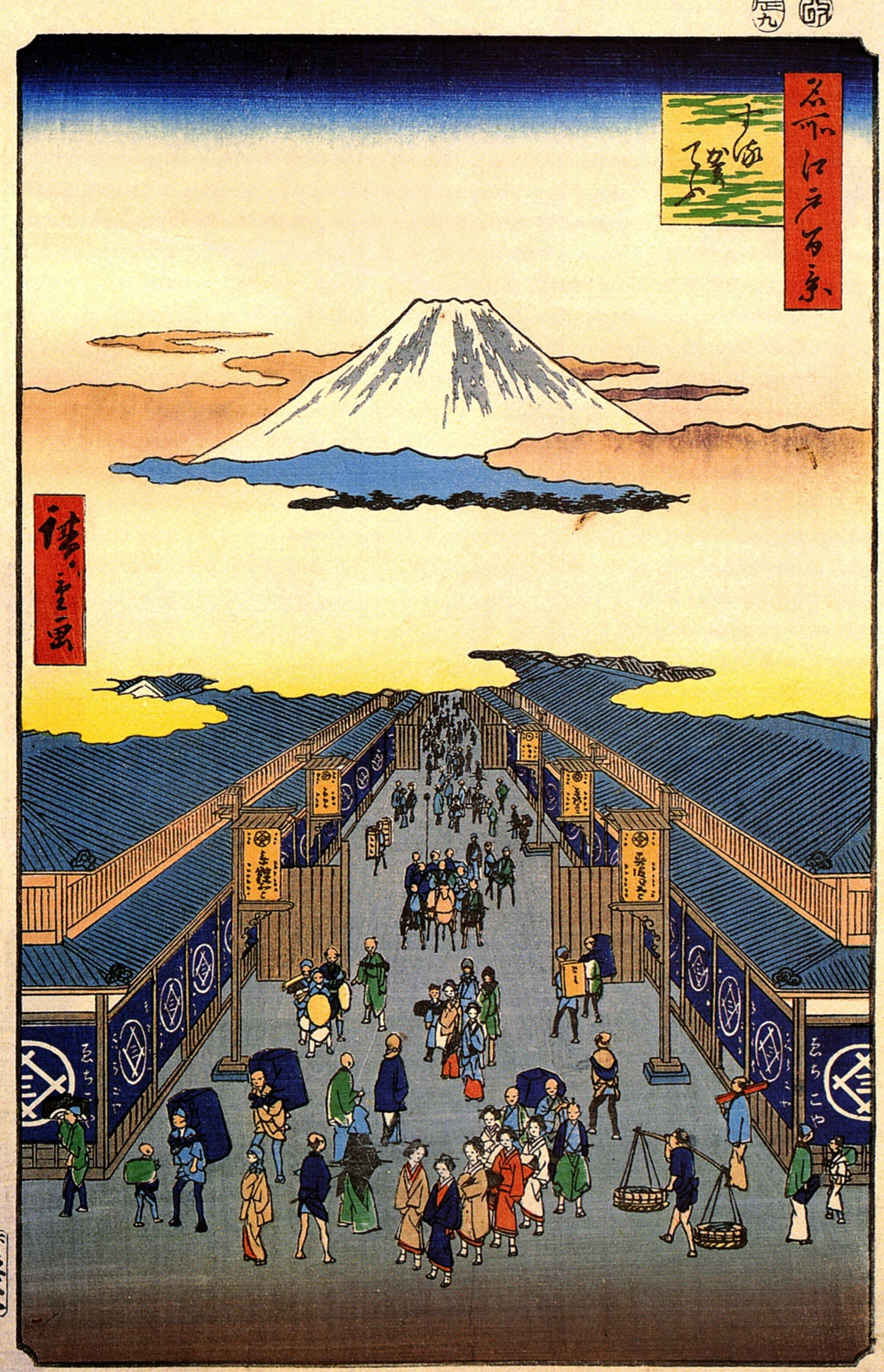
Surugacho (Suruga Street) (1856), from One Hundred Famous Views of Edo, by Hiroshige, depicting the Echigoya kimono and money exchange store with Mount Fuji in background. Currently, the Mitsui Main Building (三井本館), which houses Sumitomo Mitsui Banking Corporation, Mitsui Fudosan, The Chuo Mitsui Trust and Banking Co. and Mitsui Memorial Museum, is located on the right side of the street. Mitsukoshi department store is on the left side.

Founded by Mitsui Takatoshi (1622–1694), who was the fourth son of a shopkeeper in Matsusaka, in what became Mie prefecture. From his shop, called Echigoya (越後屋), Mitsui Takatoshi's father originally sold miso and ran a pawn shop. The family would later open a second shop in Edo (modern Tokyo).

Takatoshi moved to Edo when he was 14 years old, and later his older brother joined him. Sent back to Matsusaka by his brother, Takatoshi waited for 24 years until his older brother died before he could take over the family shop, Echigoya. He opened a new branch in 1673; a large gofukuya (kimono shop) in Nihonbashi, a district in the heart of Edo. The genesis of Mitsui's business was in the Enpō era, which was a nengō meaning "Prolonged Wealth".

In time, the gofukuya division separated from Mitsui, and became Mitsukoshi. Traditionally, gofukuyas provided products made to order; a visit was made to the customer's house (typically a person of high social class or who was successful in business), an order taken, then fulfilled. The system of accountancy was called "margin transaction". Mitsui changed this by producing products first, then selling them directly at his shop for cash. This was then an unfamiliar mode of operation in Japan. Even as the shop began providing dry goods to the government of the city of Edo, cash sales were not yet a widespread business practice.

Edo's government had struck a business deal with Osaka. Osaka would sell crops and other material to pay its land tax. The money was then sent to Edo—but moving money was dangerous in middle feudal Japan. In 1683, the shogunate granted permission for money exchanges (ryōgaeten) to be established in Edo. The Mitsui "exchange shops" facilitated transfers while mitigating risks.

=== Formation of Mitsui zaibatsu ===
After the Meiji Restoration, Mitsui was among the enterprises that were able to expand to become zaibatsu not simply because they were already big and rich at the start of modern industrial development. Firms like Mitsui and Sumitomo were led by non-family managers such as Minomura Rizaemon, who guided the business by accurately forecasting the coming political and economic situations, by acquaintance with high-ranking government officials or politicians, and bold investment.

Mitsui's main business in the early period was drapery, finance, and trade, the first two being the businesses it inherited from the Edo period. It entered into mining when it acquired a mine as collateral from a loan it had made, partly because it could buy a mine cheaply from the government, Mitsui then diversified to become the biggest business in pre-war Japan. The diversification was mainly into related fields to take advantage of accumulated capabilities; for instance, the trading company entered into chemicals to attain forward integration.

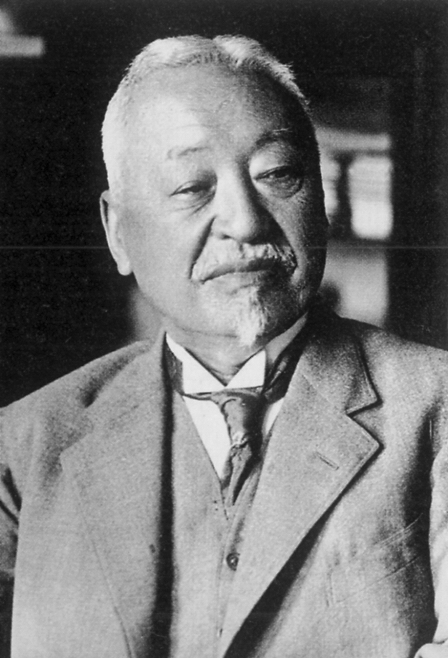
Masuda Takashi

On July 1, 1876, Mitsui Bank, Japan's first private bank, was founded with Masuda Takashi (1848–1938) as its president. Mitsui Bank, which following a merger with Taiyō-Kobe Bank in the mid-1980s became part of Sakura Bank, survives as part of the Sumitomo Mitsui Banking Corporation. During the early 20th century, Mitsui was one of the largest zaibatsu, operating in numerous fields.

Mitsui Bank became the holding company of the Mitsui zaibatsu from 1876. It was joined as an ultimate parent company by Mitsui & Co. and Mitsui Mining in 1900, with various industrial concerns owned by various combinations of these companies and their subsidiaries.

Likewise, Mitsui invested in maritime transportation to support its trading activities as well as invest in passenger transportation, first with the creation in 1878, of Osaka Shosen Kaisha (OSK), which was merged with Mitsui Steamship in 1964, to become Mitsui OSK Lines (MOL), which became one of the largest ocean shipping groups in the world.

When the United Kingdom withdrew from the gold standard in 1931, during the height of the Great Depression, Mitsui Bank and Mitsui & Co. were found to have speculated around the transaction. This raised a political furor in Japan and resulted in the assassination of Mitsui executive Dan Takuma.

During the Second World War, Mitsui employed American prisoners of war as slave laborers, some of whom were maimed by Mitsui employees.

=== Postwar development as keiretsu ===
In 1947 and 1948, the Supreme Commander Allied Powers pressed the Japanese government to dismantle the ten largest zaibatsu conglomerates, including Mitsui. The Mitsui Group, broken into many separate companies, reorganized itself as a horizontal coalition of independent companies in the 1950s, once the occupation of Japan had ended and some of the smaller companies were allowed to re-coalesce. The central firms in the keiretsu became Mitsui Bank and Mitsui & Co.

Mitsui lagged somewhat behind its rivals Mitsubishi and Sumitomo Group in reorganization. Mitsui Bank, which should have been the mainstay and principal capital provider of the group, declined in size due to the collapse of the Imperial Bank after the war, which resulted in reduced cohesion of the conglomerate. Many companies that were once part of the Mitsui Group have become independent or tied to other conglomerates. Specifically, Toshiba, Toyota and Suntory, once part of the Mitsui Group, became independent, with the Toyota Group becoming a conglomerate in its own right.

Ishikawajima-Harima Heavy Industries (IHI Corporation) is now considered to be part of the Mizuho Group, and many companies in the Sumitomo Mitsui Financial Group are more closely tied to the Sumitomo Group than the Mitsui Group. As of 2021 there were signs that Mitsubishi UFJ Financial Group and the Mitsubishi Group could be taking over other parts of the Sumitomo Mitsui Financial Group. Mitsukoshi merged into Isetan, a major department store with close ties to the Bank of Tokyo-Mitsubishi UFJ, to form Isetan Mitsukoshi Holdings in April 2008.

== Makeup of the Mitsui Group ==
Companies associated with the Mitsui keiretsu include Mitsui & Co, Sumitomo Mitsui Trust Holdings, Japan Steel Works, Mitsui Chemicals, Mitsui Construction, Mitsui E&S, Mitsui Fudosan, Mitsui-gold, Mitsui Mining & Smelting, Mitsui Oil Exploration (MOECO), Mitsui OSK Lines, Mitsui Petrochemical Industries Ltd, Mitsui-Soko, Mitsui Sumitomo Insurance Group, Nippon Paper Industries, Pacific Coast Recycling, Sumitomo Mitsui Banking Corporation, Taiheiyo Cement, TBS Holdings, Toray Industries, Tri-net Logistics Management, and Mitsui Commodity Risk Management (MCRM).

=== Mitsui companies in the Nikkei 225 ===
- Aim Services
- Denka
- Isetan Mitsukoshi Holdings
- JA Mitsui Leasing
- Japan Steel Works
- Mitsui & Co
- Mitsui Chemicals
- Mitsui E&S
- Mitsui Fudosan
- Mitsui Life Insurance
- Mitsui Mining & Smelting
- Mitsui OSK Lines
- Mitsui Sumitomo Insurance Group
- Mitsui-Soko Holdings
- Nippon Paper Industries
- Nihon Unisys
- Sanki Engineering
- Sapporo Brewery
- Shin Nippon Air Technologies
- Sumitomo Mitsui Banking Corporation
- Sumitomo Mitsui Construction
- Sumitomo Mitsui Financial Group
- Sumitomo Mitsui Trust Holdings
- TBS Holdings
- Toray Industries
- Toyo Engineering Corporation

== Other investments ==
- West Midlands Trains – Mitsui owned 15% of the British rail operator until February 2026.
- BHP
- Columbia Asia
- Fujifilm
- IHH Healthcare Berhad – Mitsui & Co owns 20.5% of the company and is represented on its board.
- Ito-Yokado (Seven & I Holdings）
- Kanebo (Kao Corporation)
- Komatsu
- Multi X (Multiexport Foods) – Mitsui owns 24.5% of the company and is represented on its board.
- Oji Paper Company - once had a transaction in its development on the purchase of several Mitsui subsidiaries by Oji.
- The Oriental Land Company (Keisei Electric Railway)
- Paul Stuart - sold in 2025
- Rio Tinto
- Sagami Railway
- Sims Metal – Mitsui & Co owns 18% of the company and is represented on its board.
- Sony
- Suntory
- Toyota
- Vale
- Yamaha
- Yanmar

== See also ==
- List of Japanese companies
- Mitsui & Co
- Mitsui family
- Mitsui Golden Glove Award
- Mitsui O.S.K. Lines
- Sumitomo Mitsui Financial Group

== General sources ==
- Hall, John Whitney (1970). Japan: From Prehistory to Modern Times. Delacorte Universal History no. XX. New York: Delacorte Press. ISBN 0-297-00237-6.
- Shinjō, Hiroshi (1962). History of the Yen: 100 Years of Japanese Money-economy. Kobe: Research Institute for Economics & Business Administration, Kōbe University.
