= Mitsukoshi BGC =

- The mall in 2023
- Location: Taguig, Metro Manila, Philippines
- Coordinates: 14°33′31.24″N 121°3′11.94″E
- Address: 8th Avenue cor. 36th Street, Bonifacio Global City
- Opened: November 18, 2022; 3 years ago
- Developer: Nomura Real Estate Development; Isetan Mitsukoshi Holdings; Federal Land, Inc.
- Manager: Sunshine Fort North Bonifacio Commercial Management Corporation
- Architect: Torafu Architects
- Num. of stores: ~120
- Floor area: 28,000 m^{2} (300,000 sq ft)
- Floors: 3 upper + 1 basement
- Public transit: Bus interchange
- Website: www.mitsukoshi.ph

Mitsukoshi BGC is a shopping mall in Bonifacio Global City in Taguig, Philippines. It is the first outlet of the Japanese retail chain Mitsukoshi in the Philippines.

== History ==
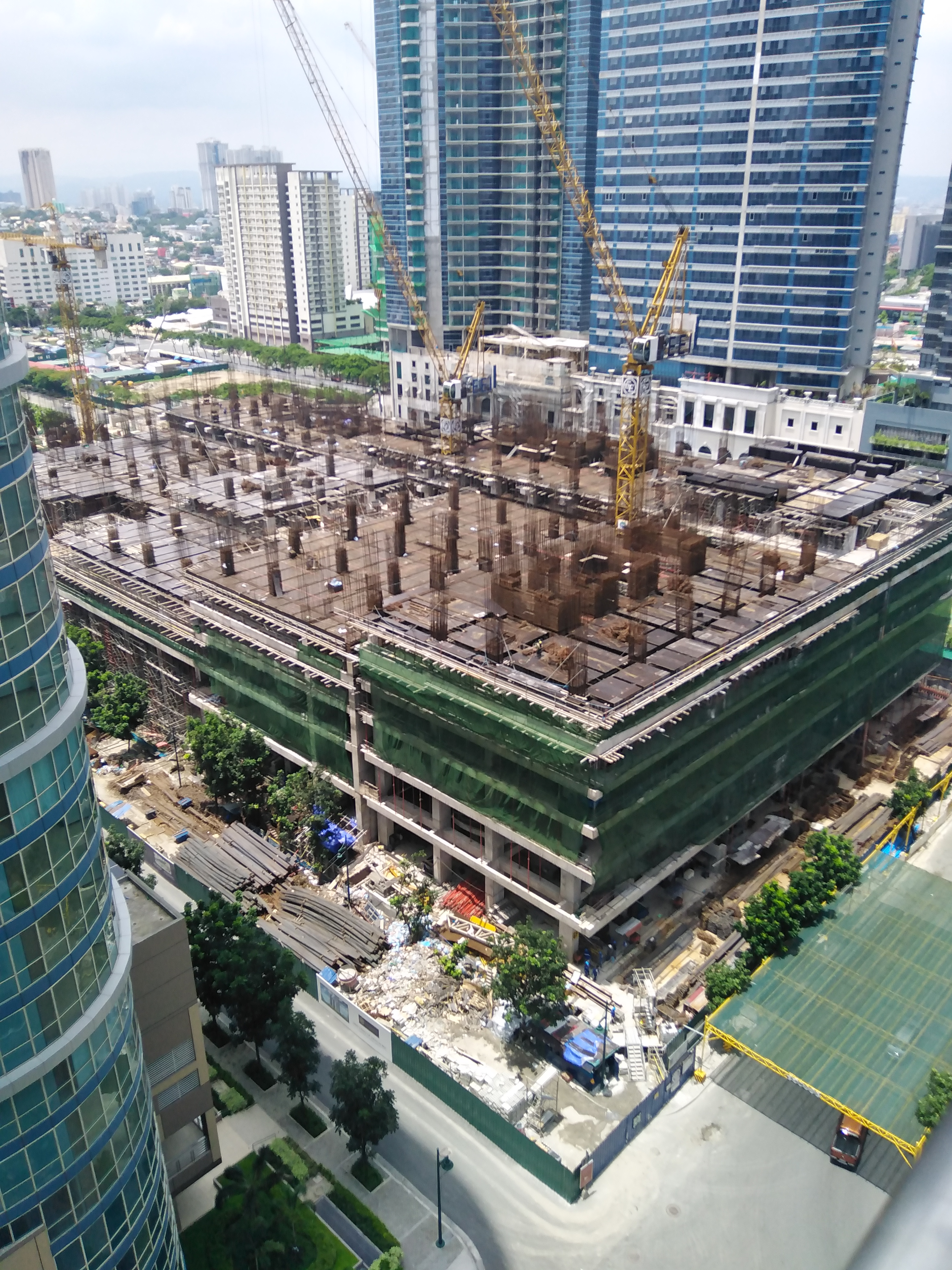
The mall podium structure under construction, July 2019

In 2018, Japanese firm Mitsukoshi, Ltd. announced that it would open the first branch of its retail chain in the Philippines.

The retail outlet, named Mitsukoshi BGC, would be developed as a joint project between Japanese companies Nomura Real Estate Development and Isetan Mitsukoshi Holdings with Philippine firm Federal Land. The project includes the adjacent Seasons Residences.

Mitsukoshi BGC partially started operations with its soft opening on November 18, 2022. The grand opening for the mall was held on July 21, 2023.

== Architecture and design ==
Mitsukoshi BGC is the podium structure for the four-tower The Seasons Residences residential complex. The mall structure covers four storeys, which includes a basement level.

The Seasons, including the podium hosting the mall, was designed by Japanese firm Torafu Architects in collaboration with artist Asao Tokolo. The façade, which is a product of the collaboration, features a geometric design that is a derivation of the Japanese hemp leaf.

== Facilities and tenants ==
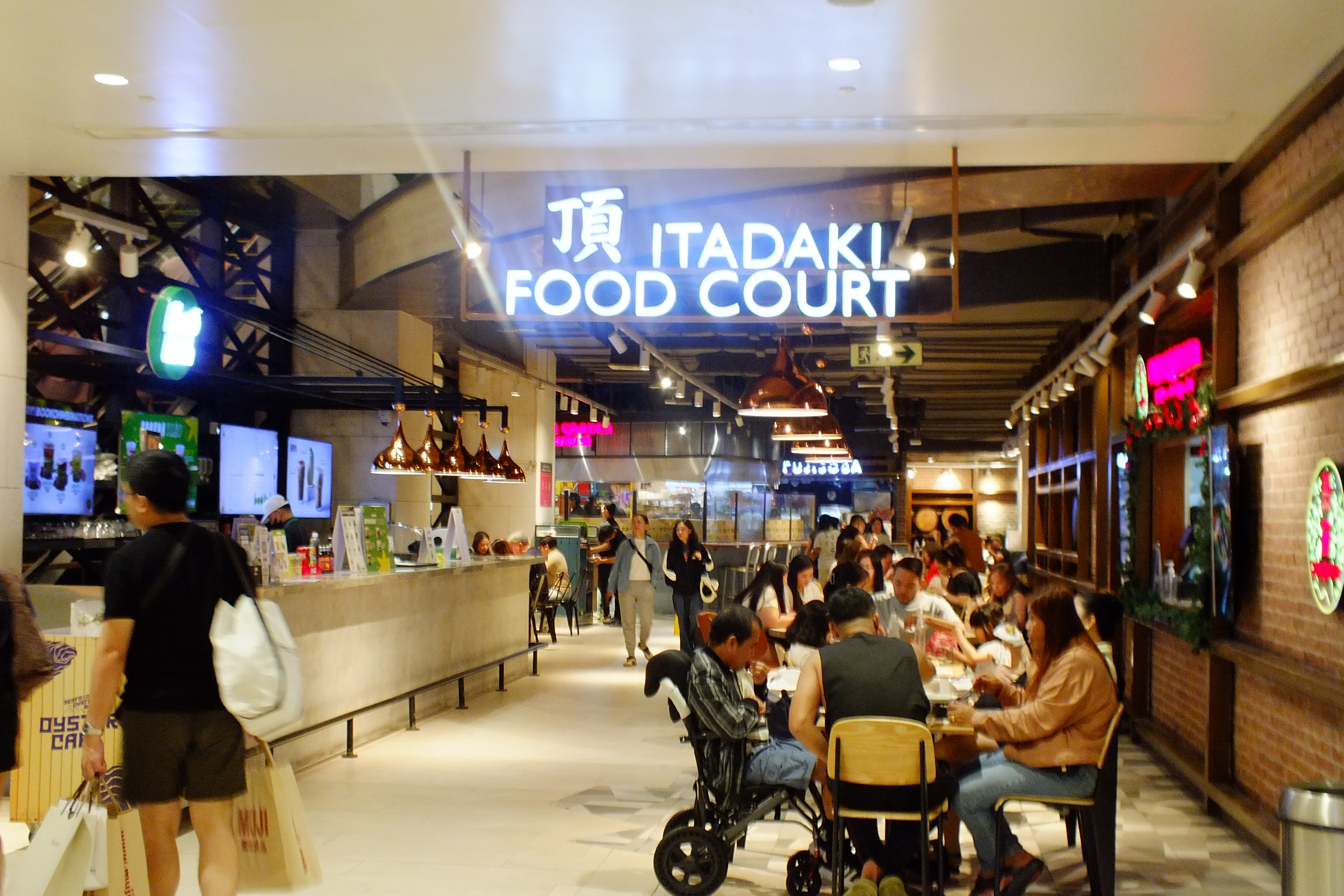
Itadaki Food Court

Mitsukoshi BGC deviates from the standard department store model of the Mitsukoshi brand and instead follows a shopping mall format with 120 tenants when it first opened.

Marketed as a "lifestyle mall", Mitsukoshi BGC primarily features stores and outlets under Japanese brands. In its basement, it hosts the Itadaki Food Court and Mitsukoshi Fresh, a depachika or food market.
