= Iwataya =

Department store chain

- Native name: 岩田屋
- Industry: Retail
- Founded: October 7, 1936; 90 years ago
- Founder: Nakamuta Kihei II
- Headquarters: Tenjin, Chūō-ku, Fukuoka, Japan
- Parent: Iwataya Mitsukoshi (Isetan Mitsukoshi Holdings)

Iwataya (岩田屋, Iwataya) is a Japanese department store chain in Fukuoka Prefecture and owned by Iwataya Mitsukoshi Ltd. (株式会社岩田屋三越, Kabushiki Gaisha Iwataya Mitsukoshi), a group company of Isetan Mitsukoshi Holdings, Ltd. Two stores are in Tenjin (est. 1936) and Kurume (est. 1972). One of Kyushu's oldest department stores, Iwataya has been in business in Tenjin for 70 years. In addition to garments and household goods, Iwataya offers items of a wide variety of genres as well as children's brands.

== History ==
=== Origins and the 1936 store ===
By the early Shōwa period, the business was directed by the second Nakamuta Kihei (1891–1980), a dealer in kimono fabrics in Fukuoka, who set about persuading those around him that the firm should move into department store trading. The city had seen a run of such openings from 1925 onwards, and associates objected that the market was already crowded. Kihei argued the opposite case: a concentration of department stores in Fukuoka would hold regional purchasing power in the city instead of letting it drain towards Osaka and Tokyo.

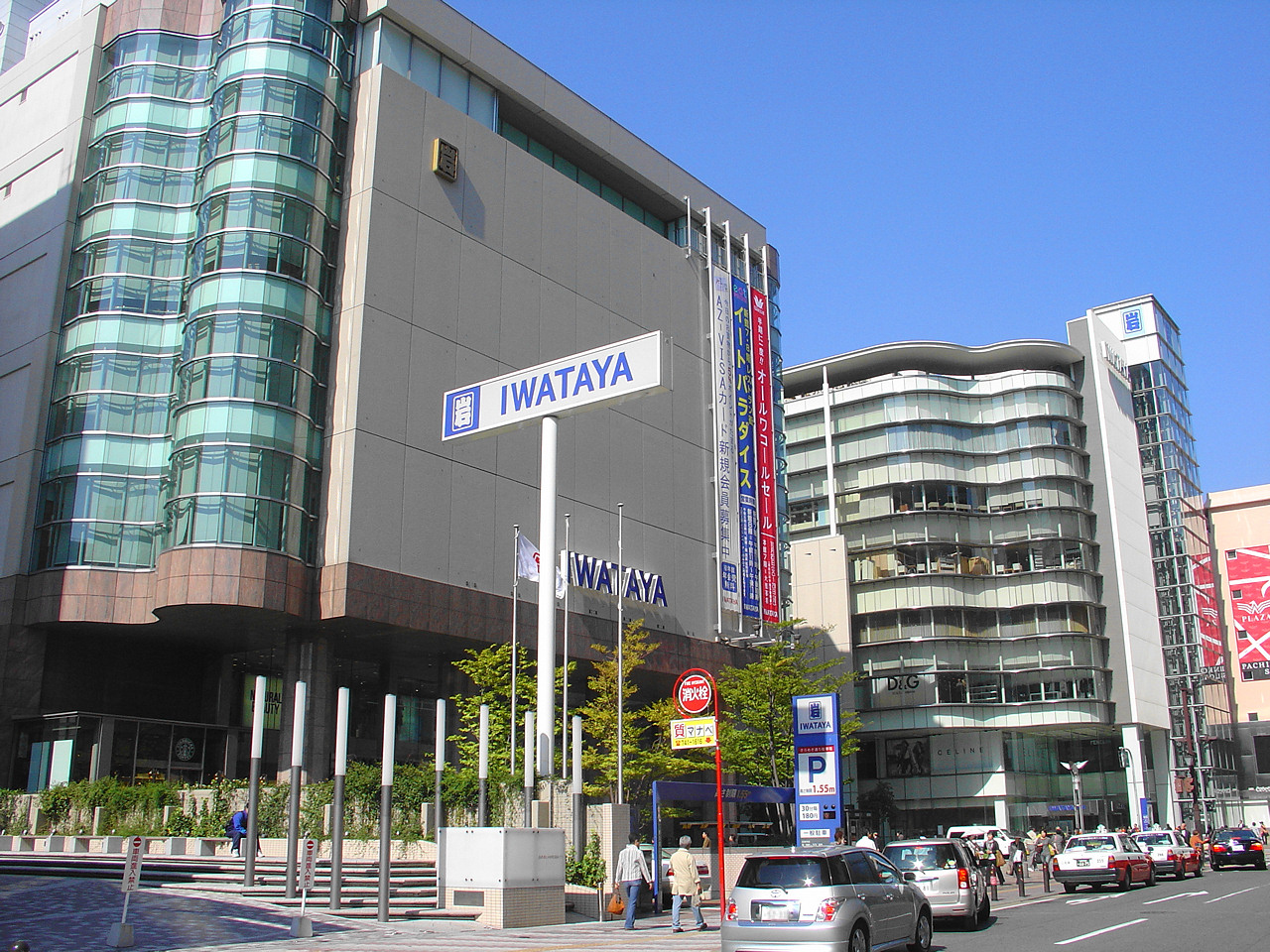
The head store of Iwataya in Tenjin, Chūō-ku, Fukuoka

Rather than Hakata, where the firm had been established, Kihei settled on the Tenjin district. The choice was encouraged by Matsunaga Yasuzaemon (1875–1971), a leading figure in the electricity industry and a substantial customer of the Iwataya fabric shop, who had built the Kyushu Railway and placed its Fukuoka terminus in Tenjin. Matsunaga proposed attaching a department store to the station and introduced Kihei to Kobayashi Ichizō (1873–1957), the founder of Hankyu, who had opened Japan's first terminal department store at Umeda in Osaka and offered to pass on the methods used there.

The store opened on 7 October 1936 in a building of eight storeys above ground and one below, with a total floor area of roughly 4,500 tsubo. Although Fukuoka then had a population of about 290,000, the opening day drew well in excess of 100,000 visitors. It was the first terminal department store in Kyushu, opened as an integral part of the present Nishitetsu Fukuoka (Tenjin) Station, and together with Nishi-Nippon Railroad it played a large part in forming one of the region's principal commercial districts. During the Second World War it cut back its selling area and its external walls were painted a dark colour in the hope of escaping air attack; the building came through the bombing of Fukuoka intact.

=== Post-war expansion ===
In 1947 Kihei passed the presidency to his eldest son, Nakamuta Kiichirō (1915–2008), who was 32 and had been with the company for around eighteen months. A sequence of branch openings followed: Hita in Ōita Prefecture in 1947, Kurume in 1972, Kumamoto in 1973 and Nishijin in 1981. The company's growth ran alongside that of Nishi-Nippon Railroad, successor to the Kyushu Railway, as housing development spread rapidly along its lines, and in 1948 Kiichirō brought together representatives of neighbouring retailers in an association named Toshinkai, formed with the declared aim of making Tenjin the centre of Fukuoka. In 1963 he took up an invitation from Sejima Ryūzō, then a director of Itochu, to build a food supermarket chain in Kyushu; the first outlet opened in Kumamoto that autumn under the name Sunny. Kiichirō handed the presidency to his younger brother Eizō in 1985, and in 1989 his eldest son Kenichi took office as president at 42.

=== Financial crisis and restructuring ===
By the time Kenichi became president, the group carried a negative net worth of about 17 billion yen; losses at the Nishijin store were among the consequences of the multi-store strategy, and the asset price bubble collapsed in 1991. The Tenjin main store nonetheless remained profitable, and the board believed corrective measures could be deferred. Kenichi pressed ahead with a separate development, Z-SIDE, which opened in September 1996 near the main building. It was directed at working women between 25 and 39, but the customers it drew were younger than anticipated, and average spending failed to rise.

A change of buying method adopted in 1995 added to the difficulty. Japanese department stores conventionally traded on consignment, with the apparel supplier carrying the stock and staffing the floor. Iwataya instead purchased goods on its own account and dispensed with supplier-provided sales staff, assuming the risk of unsold inventory; its own staff had limited selling experience, and first-year sales at Z-SIDE came to 20 billion yen against a target of 35 billion. Trading conditions tightened further the following year, when Hakata Daimaru opened an east wing and Fukuoka Mitsukoshi took space in the Solaria Terminal building, multiplying department store selling space in Tenjin roughly 2.7 times. Negative net worth reached 30 billion yen, and in August 1999 the company sold the main building, styled A-SIDE, together with the adjoining A-LIVE building, to the Tsuzuki Gakuen group of educational institutions.

Group operating revenues fell by 28.6 per cent to 145.7 billion yen in the 2000 business year. The company disposed of its entire holding in its supermarket subsidiary to Seiyu in August 2001 but still showed consolidated negative net worth of about 16.5 billion yen at the end of that month, and for the year to 28 February 2002 it forecast an unconsolidated net loss of 24.8 billion yen.

A three-year restructuring plan was made public on 26 February 2002, providing for a waiver of 28 billion yen of debt by creditor banks, 300 redundancies, the winding up of loss-making operations and a halving of the capital, with interest-bearing group borrowings to be brought down from 89.6 billion yen to about 70 billion. Isetan announced on 5 March that it would provide financial and operational support, undertaking to subscribe 750 million yen of new shares and become the largest shareholder, to second a new president and a further executive, and to supply expertise in marketing, merchandise development, visual presentation and operating systems; its support was conditional on creditors accepting the plan. By July 2002 Isetan envisaged an 18 per cent stake, its president stating that financial institutions had asked the company to enlarge the holding and that the eventual size had not been determined. Under the plan the Nakamuta family relinquished control and Sakuma Yoshinari, a vice-president of Isetan, replaced Kenichi as president, while Kiichirō was retained as a special adviser.

Trading at the founding site ended in February 2004 and the main store moved into the former Z-SIDE building. In October 2010 Iwataya and the regional operating company Fukuoka Mitsukoshi were combined under Isetan Mitsukoshi Holdings to form Iwataya Mitsukoshi.

== Kurume store ==
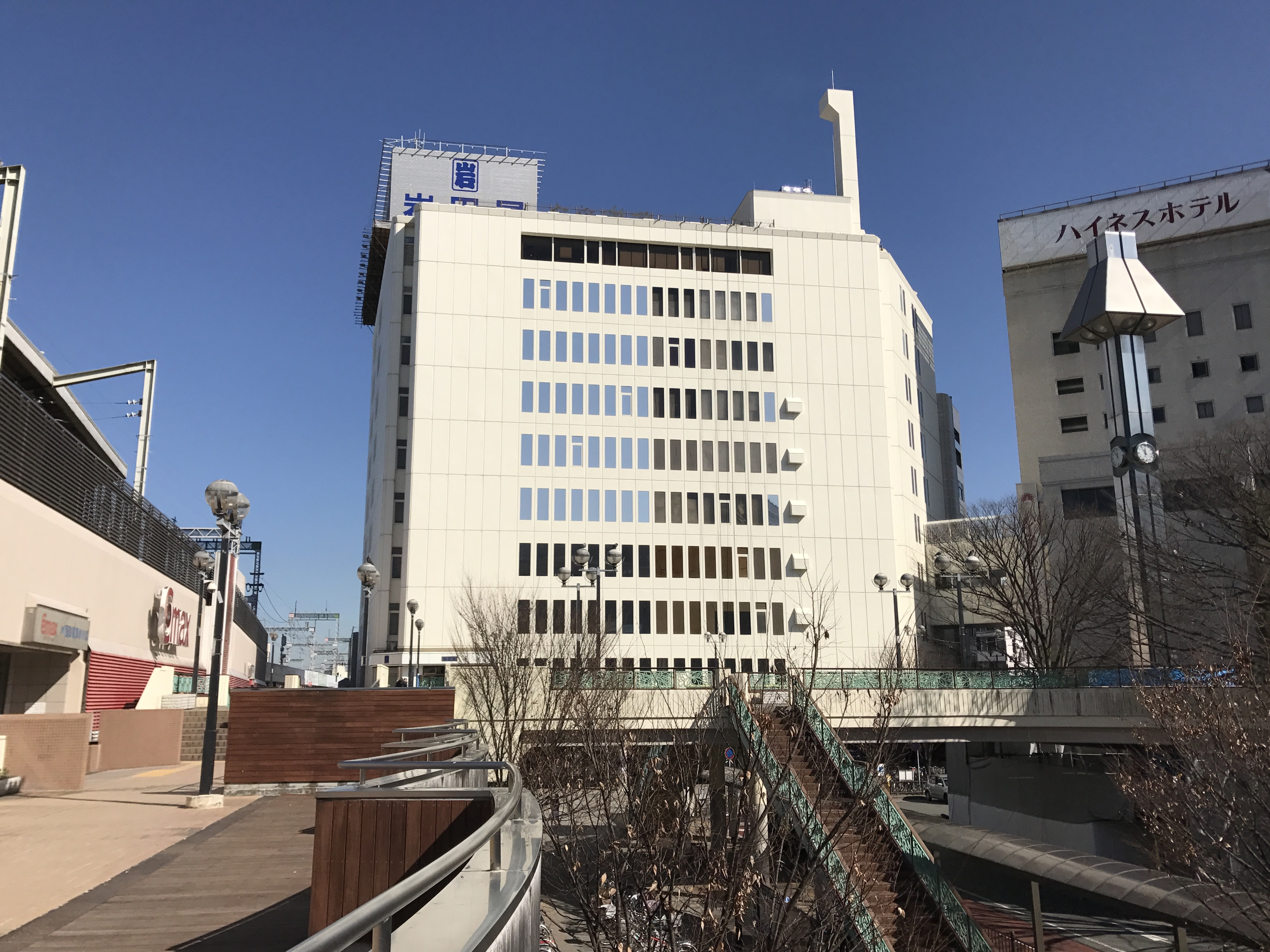
Kurume Iwataya

The Kurume store opened in May 1972 in a building of eleven storeys above ground and one below, adjoining the eastern exit of Nishitetsu Kurume Station. In August 1983 a second building opened as the centrepiece of the redevelopment of the station's eastern exit and the original building was refurbished, after which the store traded from two premises. Iwataya occupied about 5,000 m² on the first to fourth floors of the newer building, trading in menswear and confectionery and housing a branch of the Libro bookshop chain, while the upper floors were taken by a hotel.

On 14 September 2018, Iwataya Mitsukoshi announced that trading in the newer building would cease on 21 March 2019 and that the store would continue in the main building alone, reducing its scale in order to cut running costs and improve profitability. The company said that operating with reduced staff, refurbishing the cosmetics department, opening the roof to customers and investing in the food floor had brought some benefit but had not secured stable results, and that the retail district around the station had been in decline. Across both buildings, the store had a selling area of 17,655 m² and sales of 11.771 billion yen in the 2017 financial year, and it employed 130 people.

== Trading performance ==
For the year to March 2025 Iwataya Mitsukoshi reported unconsolidated sales of 40.5 billion yen, an increase of 3 per cent, and after-tax profit of 4.3 billion yen, up 14 per cent, attributing the result to steady domestic demand and to purchases of foreign brand goods and jewellery by inbound visitors. Turnover at the Iwataya main store was about 90 billion yen, the highest recorded since the company was formed in 2010.

In a survey of department store operators in Kyushu and Okinawa compiled by Teikoku Databank, Iwataya Mitsukoshi ranked first by turnover among operators headquartered in the region in the 2024 financial year, ahead of Izutsuya of Kitakyushu and Tsuruya of Kumamoto. Combined sales of the ten largest operators rose 1.3 per cent, with inbound demand favouring stores in Fukuoka while several outside the city recorded declines.

== Former stores ==
- Tobata
- Yame
- Nishijin
- Hita
- Kumamoto
