= Takaharu Mitsui =

Japanese businessman and philatelist (1900–1983)

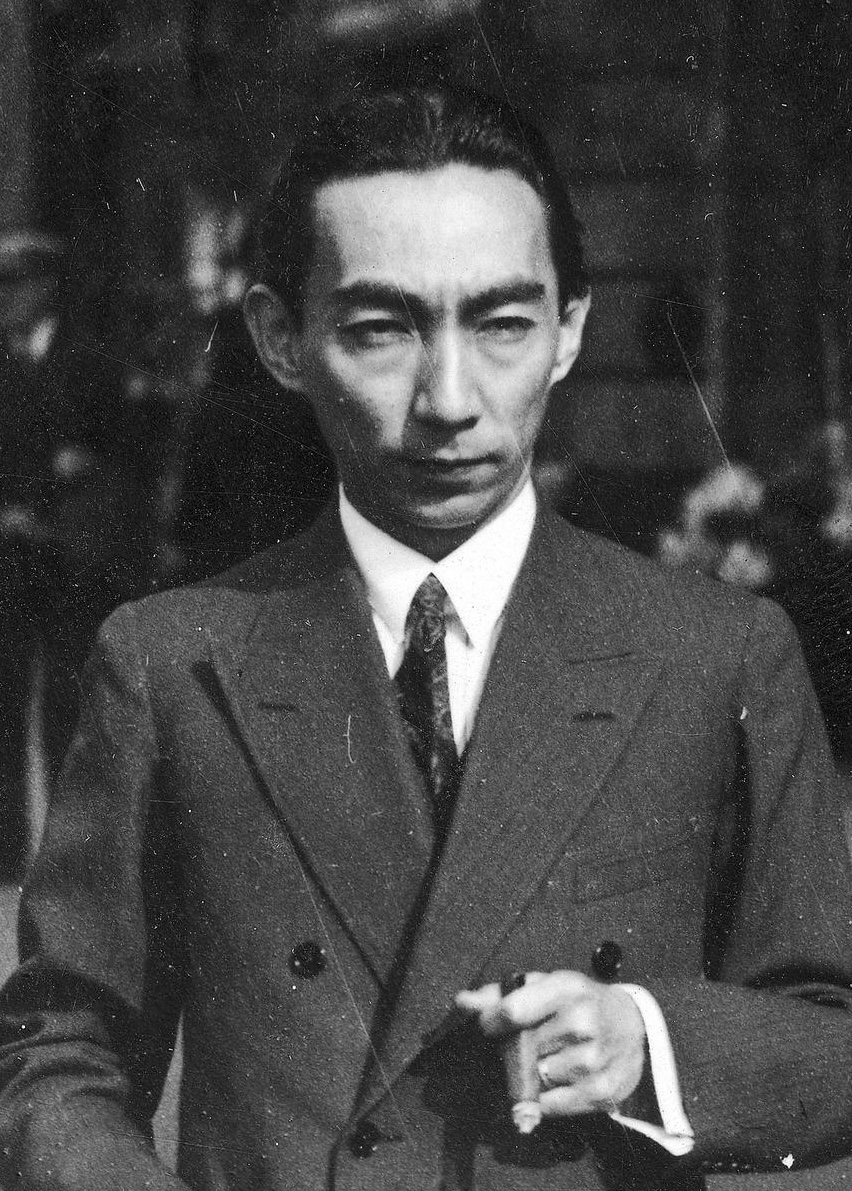

Baron Takaharu Mitsui (三井 高陽, Mitsui Takaharu; 10 July 1900 – 19 May 1983) was a Japanese businessman, scholar and philatelist. He is considered the "dean of Japanese philately" by many in the philatelic world.

He headed one of six main branches of the Mitsui family, of the Mitsui zaibatsu.

== Biography ==
Mitsui was born on 10 July 1900. His father was Baron Takanori Mitsui was head on the Minami branch of the Mitsui family. He graduated from Keio University in 1922, specializing in economic history. He began working for Mitsui Mining the following year. He also studied in Germany from 1925 to 1929. After returning home, he lectured at Keio University alongside his business activities. Mitsui became a director at Mitsui Mining and Mitsui & Co., before becoming the first president of Mitsui Line in 1942.

Starting in 1934, Mitsui travelled several countries in Central and Eastern Europe (including Finland, Poland, Czechoslovakia, Hungary and Austria) in order to promote Japanese culture and establish bilateral cultural societies. He also donned funds to initiate Japanese Studies in these countries. The most lasting effort in this respect was his support of the Vienna Japan Institute (now Department of East Asian Studies, Japanese Studies at Vienna University) established in 1939 with the Japanese scholar Oka Masao becoming its first head. In 1940, Mitsui donated 200,000 Japanese yen toward the construction of the new Japanese-German Culture Institute (founded in 1927) in Tokyo, for which he was awarded a medal by Adolf Hitler himself, and in 1943 he became chairman of the board of this institution, which was important for German-Japanese relations. In addition, Mitsui was awarded the title of Honorary Senator of the University of Vienna. These honors indicate his excellent relations to the Nazi regime.

After the surrender of Japan, the zaibatsu was dissolved and Mitsui himself was purged. He was continued to be involved in cultural and philatetic activities, serving as chairman of the Japanese-German Society and the Joshibi University of Art and Design.

== Philately ==
=== Collecting interest ===
Mitsui specialized in the collection and study of postage stamps and postal history of Japan. He was also a collector of German and Austrian philatelic items.

=== Philatetic literature ===
Mitsui wrote extensively on philatelic subjects, starting at the age of sixteen. His numerous books include: Sekai gunji yubin gaiyo, written in 1939 in collaboration with Professor Yukio Masui of Keio University, and which translates to "Outline of the Military Postal Systems of the World." This book contains a description of the little-known Japanese military postal service. He also published, in 1975, Fuiraterisuto no ashiato, (A Philatelist's Footprints) which is a detailed personal account of his life in philately.

Mitsui contributed many articles to various journals, including, Yubin kitte zasshi: The Japanese Journal of Timbrology, which he himself founded in 1923, Yubin kitte: Japan Philatelic Magazine, Kitte Kenkyu Kai, (Institute of Philatelic Research, Japan), which he founded in 1950, and Kitte kenkyu (Philatelic Research).

=== Philatelic activity ===
In addition to founding and contributing to Japanese philatelic journals, Mitsui was an official advisor to the Japanese Communications Ministry and Postal Service Ministry, and also Honorary Counselor of the International Society for Japanese Philately.

=== Legacy ===
In 1964 Mitsui donated the very important original sketches and final designs of stamps executed by Kasori Teizo from 1923 to 1952 to the Smithsonian Institution in Washington, D.C. Mitsui's extensive collections of Japanese and worldwide stamps were donated to the Communications Museum in Tokyo when he died.

== Honors and awards ==
- Honorary Senator of the University of Vienna, 1943
- named to the American Philatelic Society Hall of Fame in 1984.

== See also ==
- Philatelic literature
- Philately

== Literature ==
Scheid, Bernhard. “Der Ethnologe als Geburtshelfer nationaler Identität: Oka Masao und seine Netzwerke 1935–1945.” Andre Gingrich, Peter Rohrbacher (Eds), Völkerkunde zur NS-Zeit aus Wien (1938–1945), 2021, pp. 207–229. doi:10.1553/978OEAW86700
