= Mitsui (surname) =

Mitsui (written: 三井 lit. "three wells" or 光井) is a Japanese surname. Notable people with the surname include:

- Aika Mitsui (光井 愛佳; born 1993), Japanese singer
- Airi Mitsui (三井 愛梨; born 2004), Japanese swimmer
- Hideki Mitsui (三井 秀樹; born 1963), Japanese screenwriter
- Kōji Mitsui (三井 弘次; 1910–1979), Japanese actor
- Miyoko Mitsui (三井 美代子; born 1919), Japanese hurdler
- Risako Mitsui (三井 梨紗子; born 1993), Japanese synchronized swimmer
- Takaharu Mitsui (三井 高陽; 1900–1983), Japanese philatelist
- Mitsui Takatoshi (三井 高利; 1622–1694), founder of the Mitsui conglomerate
- Takuo Mitsui (三井 卓雄; 1909–?), Japanese sailor
- Wakio Mitsui (三井 辨雄; 1942–2021), Japanese politician
- Yōko Mitsui (三井 葉子; 1936–2014), Japanese poet
