= Isetan =

Japanese department store chain

Isetan Co., Ltd. 株式会社伊勢丹
- Type: Subsidiary
- Industry: Retail
- Founded: 1886; 140 years ago, Hatagomachi, Kanda (Sotokanda, Chūō), Tokyo, Japan as Iseya Tanji Gofukuten
- Founder: Tanji Kosuge
- Successor: Isetan Mitsukoshi Ltd.
- Headquarters: 14-1 Shinjuku 3-chōme, Shinjuku, Tokyo, Japan
- Parent: Isetan Mitsukoshi Holdings Ltd. (100%)
- Website: www.mistore.jp/shopping

Isetan (伊勢丹, Isetan) (TYO: 8238 unlisted on March 26, 2008, SGX: I15 ) is a Japanese department store. Based in Shinjuku, Tokyo, Isetan has branches throughout Japan and South East Asia, including in Jinan, Kuala Lumpur, Selangor, Shanghai, Singapore, and Tianjin, and formerly in Bangkok, Hong Kong, Kaohsiung, London, and Vienna.

On April 1, 2008, Isetan and Mitsukoshi were merged under a joint holding company called Isetan Mitsukoshi Holdings Ltd. (TYO: 3099).

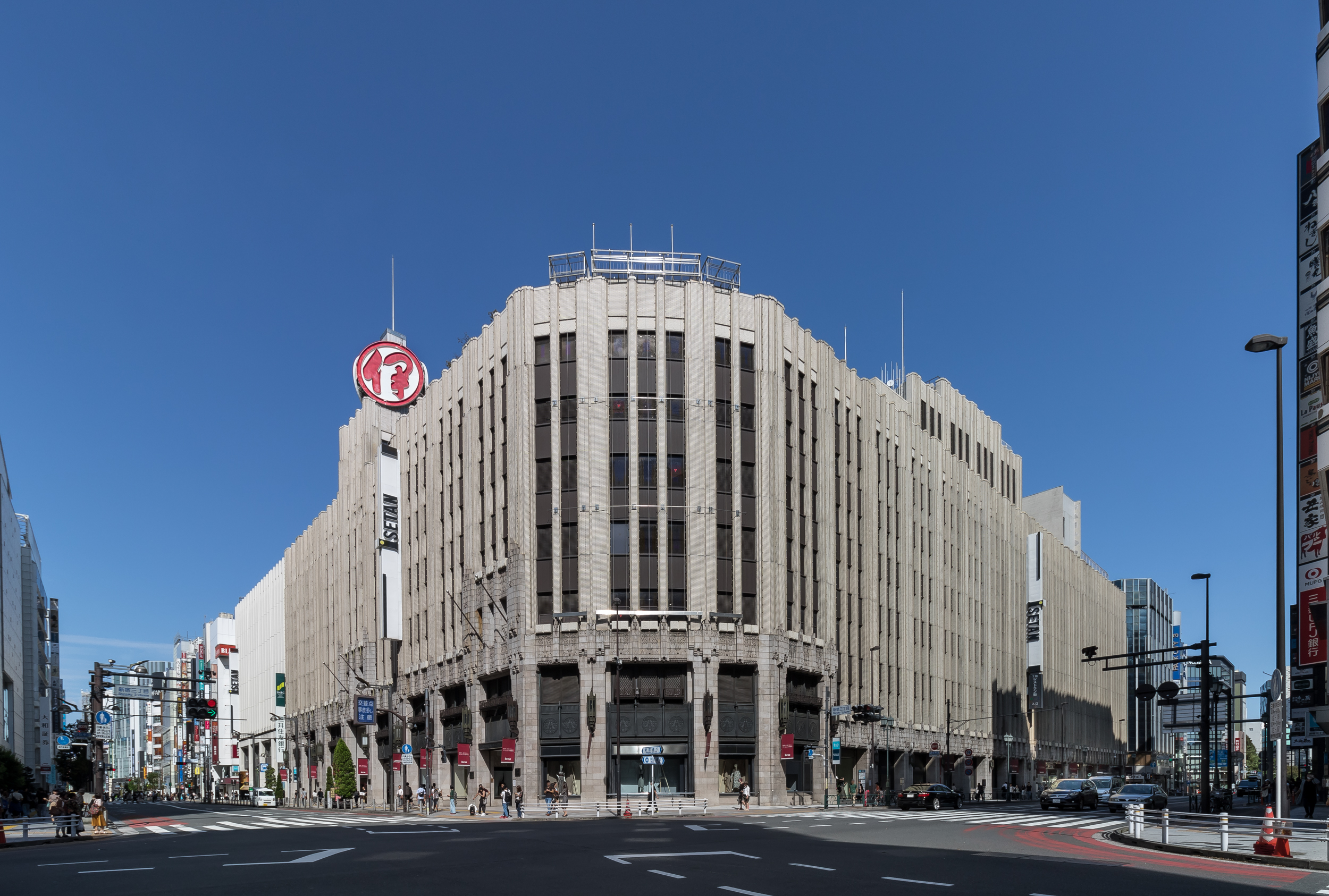
Shinjuku flagship

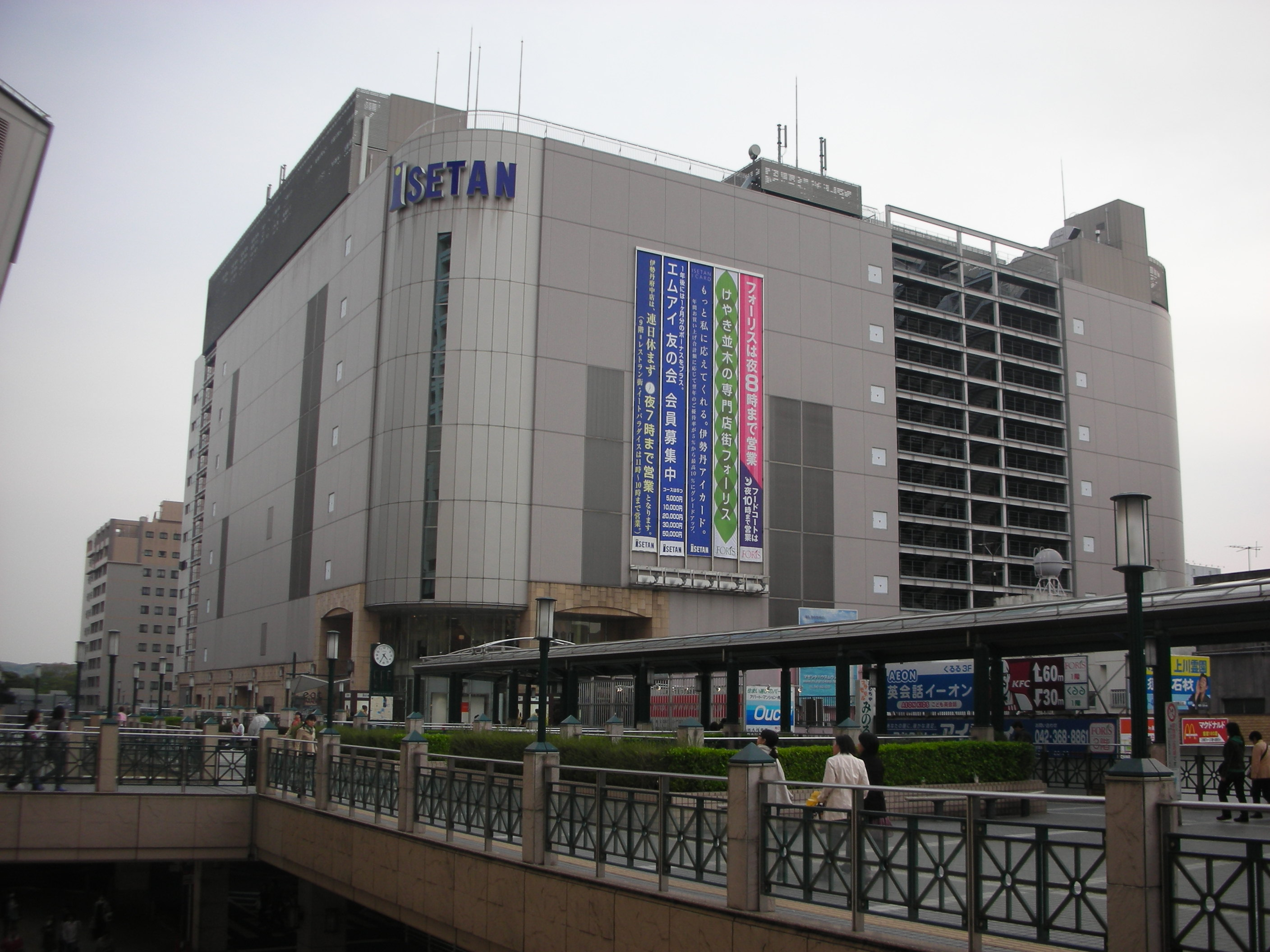
Isetan Fuchū

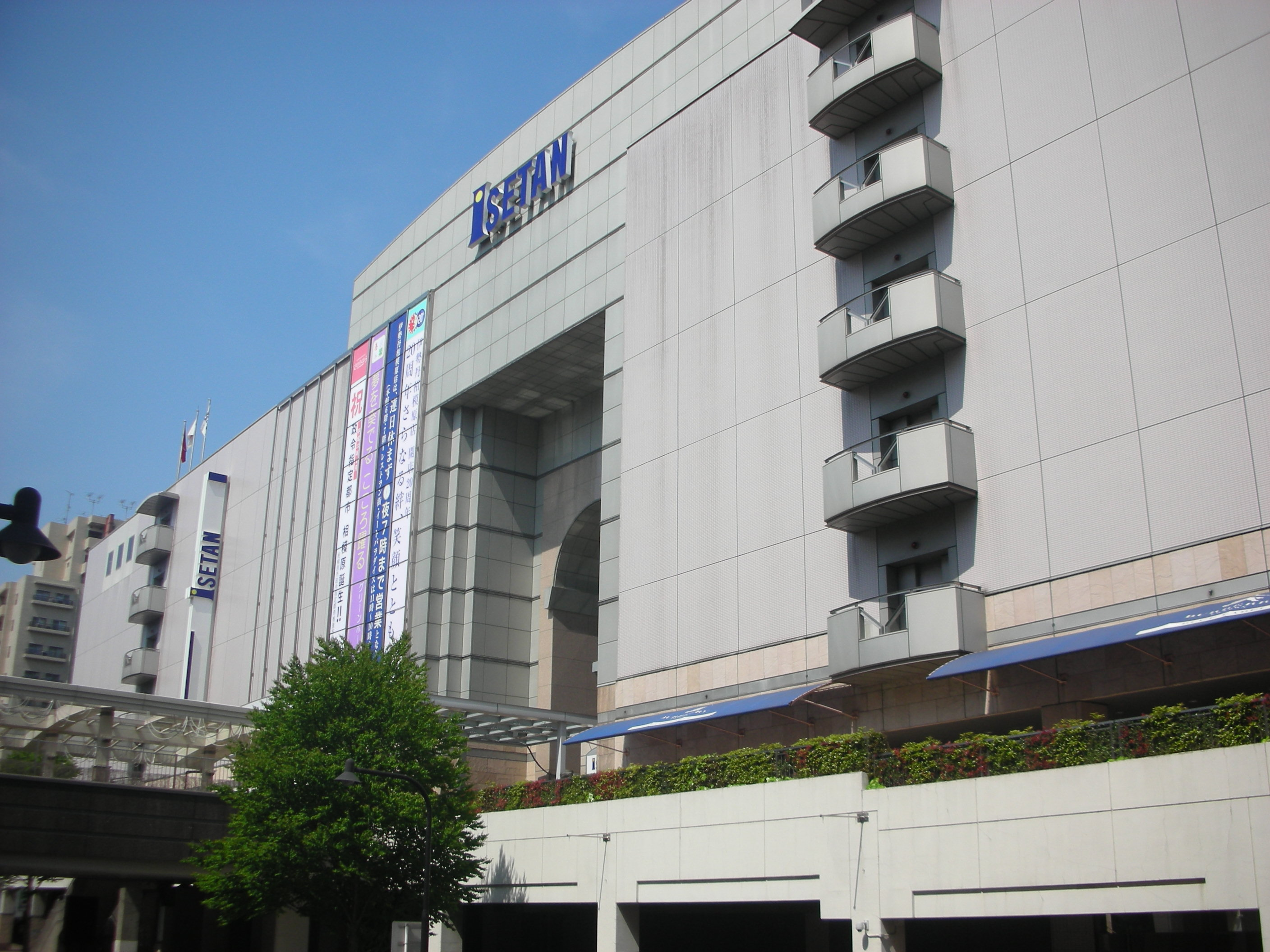
Isetan Sagamihara

== Branches in Japan ==
Name	Type	Country	City	Opened	Closed	Size			Annual sales		
Name	Type	Country	City	Opened	Closed	Sq m	Sq ft	Year	Millions of yen	Millions of USD*	Year
Isetan Shinjuku	Owned	Japan	Tokyo	Sep 28, 1933	open	64,296	692,080	2007	256,980	2,357	2007
Flagship. Attracts over 30 million shoppers per year. As of 2007, was often the #1 in apparel sales among all department store locations in Japan.; Makes the claim to be one of the most influential department stores in Japan and often first in showcasing new trends and new products.; Comprises the main store and the Isetan Men's annex building
Isetan Tachikawa	Owned	Japan	Tokyo	Oct 10, 1947	open	40,060	431,202	2007	40,535	371.85	2007
Store on the original site opened in 1947. In January 2001, a new store opened on a new site near Tachikawa station.
Isetan Kichijōji ^{(ja)}	Owned	Japan	Tokyo	Nov 10, 1971	Mar 14, 2010^{[ja]}	20,758	223,437	2007	18,274	167.64	2007
Isetan Matsudo^{(ja)}	Owned	Japan	Chiba	Apr 19, 1974	Mar 21, 2018^{[ja]}	33,109	356,382	2007	29,010	266.1	2007
Isetan Urawa	Owned	Japan	Saitama	Apr 22, 1981	open	29,355	315,975	2007	52,775	484.13	2007
Isetan Sagamihara ^{(ja)}	Owned	Japan	Kanagawa	Sep 25, 1990	Sep 30, 2019^{[ja]}	40,906	440,309	2007	32,490	298.1	2007
Isetan Fuchū (ja)	Owned	Japan	Tokyo	Apr 3, 1996	Sep 30, 2019^{[ja]}	34,102	366,102	2007	24,884	228.27	2007
JR Osaka Mitsukoshi Isetan	JV** with JR West	Japan	Osaka	2014			50,000	538,196			
At the JR West Osaka Station North Gate Building, Kita-ku, Osaka; Converted to "Isetan shops in LUCUA 1100",^{[ja]} 33,000 m^{2}
JR Kyoto Mitsukoshi Isetan	JV** with JR West	Japan	Kyoto		open						
On the west side of JR West Kyoto Station Building, Shimogyō-ku, Kyoto

*at current exchange rate **joint venture with

=== Other joint venture stores ===
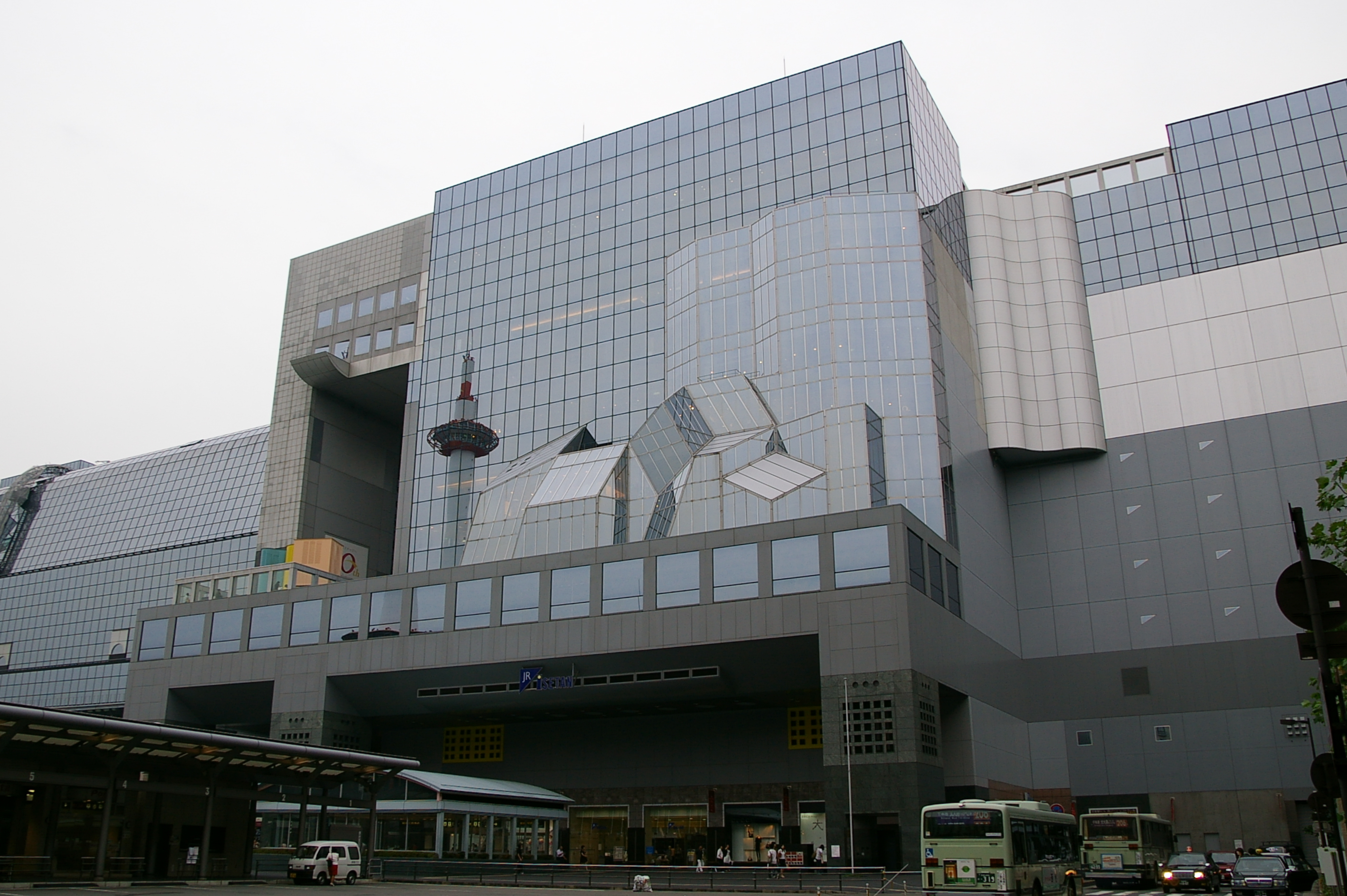
JR Kyoto Isetan (operated by West Japan Railway Isetan)

- Niigata Isetan (Chūō-ku, Niigata, operated by Niigata Isetan Mitsukoshi, Ltd.)
- Shizuoka Isetan (Aoi-ku, Shizuoka, operated by Shizuoka Isetan, Ltd.)
- West Japan Railway Isetan Ltd. (2, see table above)
- Iwataya (Tenjin, Chuo-ku, Fukuoka, operated by Iwataya Mitsukoshi Ltd.)
- HaMaYa Department Store (Nagasaki)

=== Other closed branches ===
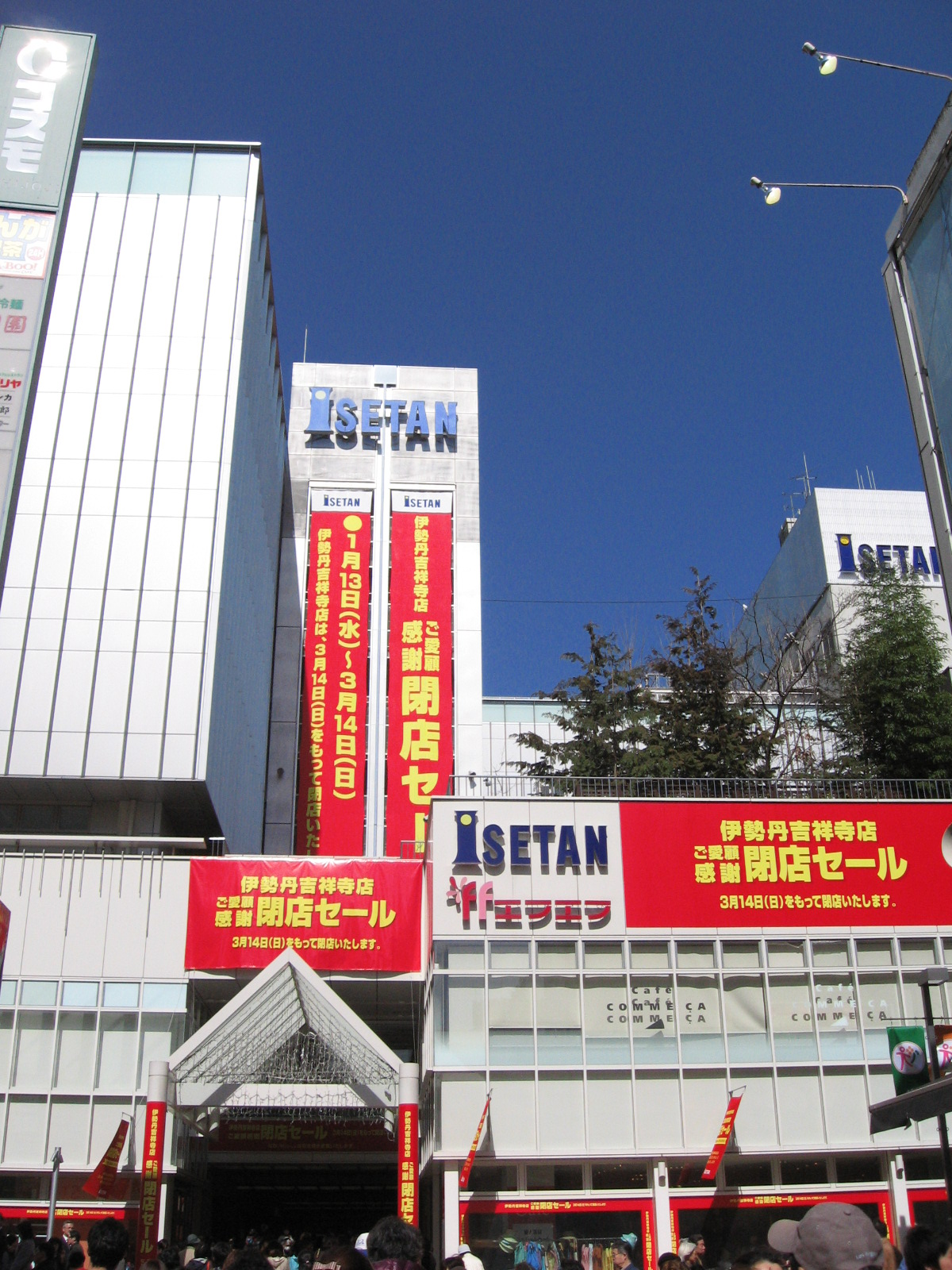
Isetan Kichijoji (F&F Buildings)

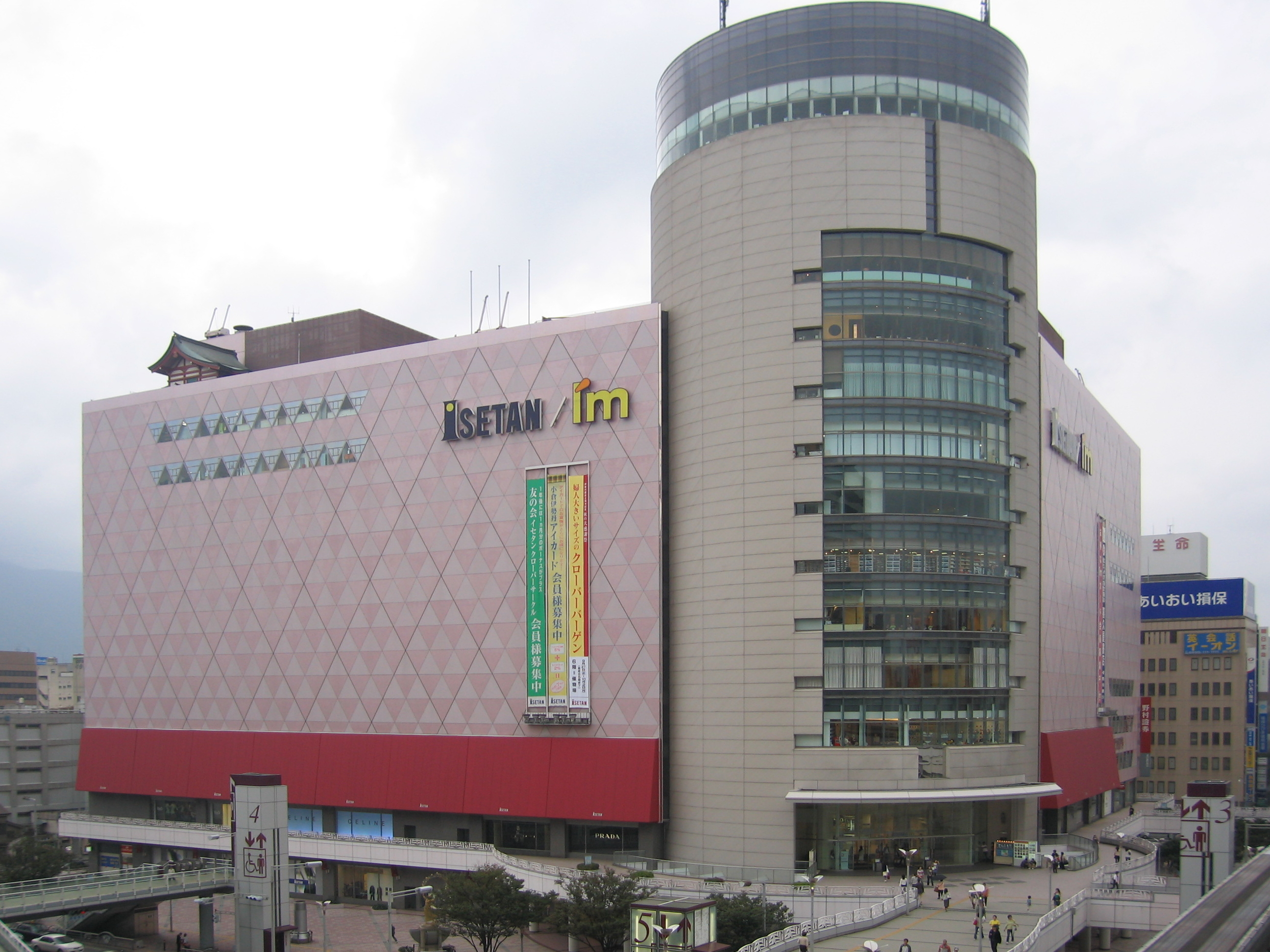
Kokura Isetan

- Hachiōji
- Kokura Isetan

== Branches outside Japan ==
=== Branches in Southeast Asia ===
- (Malaysia) Kuala Lumpur – (Suria KLCC, The Gardens at Mid Valley City, Lot 10 (as ISETAN The Japan Store)),
  Selangor – Mitsui Outlet Park KLIA (as Isetan Outlet Store))
- Singapore (Shaw House and Centre)

Isetan's first Malaysian outlet at the Weld Complex opened in late 1988.

Isetan operates as a sublessor in Singapore at Orchard's Wisma Atria, where it was previously opened, but closed in March 2015, and subsequently converted for rental purposes. Currently the space, leased to Isetan, is filled with Mango, iora, Salon Vim, DRx Medical Aesthetic Clinic, YANN VEYRIE SALON, Franck Muller, Gautier Stylish French Living, Longines, World of Watches, UCHINO MYMY, SCANTEAK, and Sony.

Several stores were closed down due to COVID-19 pandemic. These include Westgate, of which it was closed down on 8 March 2020 (replaced by Love Bonito and Scarlett), followed by CentralWorld store at Bangkok while restaurant zone and Kinokuniya Bookstores will still remain., and the closure of Parkway Parade branch on 31 January 2022 (replaced by HOOGA, Muji and Canton Paradise), and also the closure of 1 Utama branch on 5 April 2022. Also the Japan Food Town, the cluster of Japanese restaurants on the fourth floor of what previously known as Isetan Wisma Atria was shuttered. Prior to closure, some tenants were already moved out. Isetan has already received offers from external parties interested to lease its space.

Isetan Tampines closed down on 30 October 2025 and Isetan NEX Serangoon closed down on 26 April 2026.

=== Branches in China ===
- Shanghai
- Tianjin
- Chengdu

=== Closed branches outside Japan ===
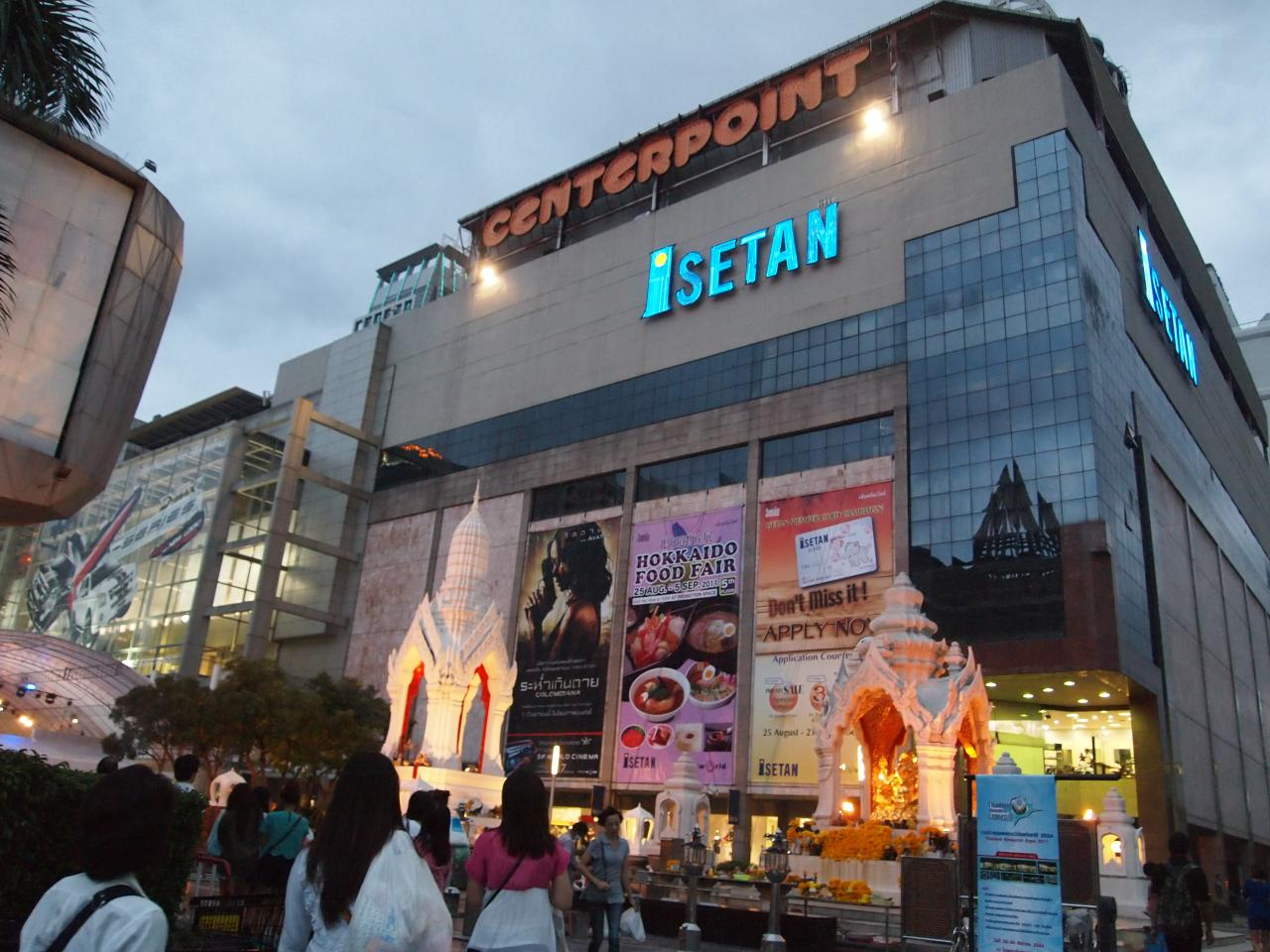
Isetan CentralWorld Bangkok, Thailand

- (Spain) Barcelona, Closed down in August 1993.
- (British Hong Kong) Tsim Sha Tsui in Hong Kong, Opened in May 1973. Closed down in 1996.
- (United Kingdom) London, Opened in August 1989. Closed down in December 2000.
- (Austria) Vienna, Opened in April 1990. Closed down in August 2003.
- (Taiwan) Kaohsiung, Opened in November 1992. Closed down in March 2008.
- Singapore Westgate, Opened in 2013. Closed down on March 8, 2020.
- (Thailand) Bangkok (CentralWorld), Opened on April 8, 1992. Closed down on August 31, 2020.
- Singapore Parkway Parade, Opened on 1983. Closed down on January 31, 2022.
- (Malaysia) Petaling Jaya (1 Utama), Opened in November 2011. Closed down on April 5, 2022.
- Singapore Tampines Mall. Opened in 1996. Closed down on October 30, 2025.
- Singapore NEX. Opened in November 2010. Closed down on April 26, 2026.
