= Mitsui family =

Japanese merchant family

Mitsui family 三井家
- Yotsumeyui (四つ目結)
- Home province: Ōmi Province
- Titles: Baron
- Founder: Mitsui Takatoshi
- Final ruler: Takakimi Mitsui
- Current head: Hisanori Mitsui
- Founding year: 1673
- Ruled until: 1946 (zaibatsu dissolved)

The Mitsui family (三井家, Mitsui-ke) is a Japanese banking and business family who established the Mitsui Group.

The Mitsui enterprise (present-day Mitsui Group) was established in 1673 when Mitsui Takatoshi (1622–1694), the son of merchant parents, established Echigoya, a dry goods department store in both Edo and Kyoto, which later became the Mitsukoshi department store chain. Meeting with great success, Takatoshi extended his services to moneylending and exchange.

In the late Edo period, the Mitsuis were the richest and most eminent family in Japan, their business being thoroughly encouraged by the shogunal government of the time. After the Meiji Restoration, the family switched allegiance to the Meiji government.

In 1909, a Mitsui controlled holding company took over the business, with Mitsui thus becoming a zaibatsu (business conglomerate) of more than 150 companies, and in modern times the group counts dozens of multinational companies in fields such as trade, banking, shipping and shipbuilding, construction, mining, oil and gas, insurance, chemicals and real estate development.

== History ==
=== Origins ===
Originally a samurai family, Governor of Echigo Province Mitsui Takayasu was exiled to Matsusaka after being defeated by Oda Nobunaga, and his son Takatoshi renounced his status as a samurai and established himself as a sake and miso merchant and a pawnbroker. The business was named "Lord Echigo's Sake" (Echigo-dono no sakaya) to commemorate Takayasu's office. Takatoshi's wife Shuhō was a skilled merchant and practically in charge of the business. She grew the business by introducing many business methods that were ground-breaking at the time, such as forfeited pawn and low-margin high-turnover. Her son Takatoshi (1622–1694), the founder of the Mitsui family, is said to have inherited his business skills mostly from his mother.

=== Edo period ===
Takatoshi moved to Edo at the age of 14, and became the manager of his elder brother Toshitsugu's kimono store. In 1674, he established the Echigoya Drapery, which later became the head company of the Mitsukoshi retail shopping chain. In contrast to most drapery merchants, who catered to feudal houses and wealthy merchants, trading on credit with no fixed prices, Takatoshi introduced an innovatory system of cash based purchase based on fixed prices for wares and targeted consumers in the emerging middle class. He subsequently started a money exchange in 1683, with a new system for inter-city loans: he extended the family business by opening an outlet in Osaka, and was appointed official purveyor of dry goods to the Tokugawa shogunate in 1687. In 1686, he relocated the headquarters of the family business from Matsusaka to Kyoto.

In 1691 the Mitsuis were officially chartered as merchants of the Tokugawa shogunate, which ruled during that time. Three years later the family members set up their first constitution, which included details about the amount of property due to each branch as well as the duties of the family council, a periodical assembly that controlled business and other personal matters.

=== Meiji era ===
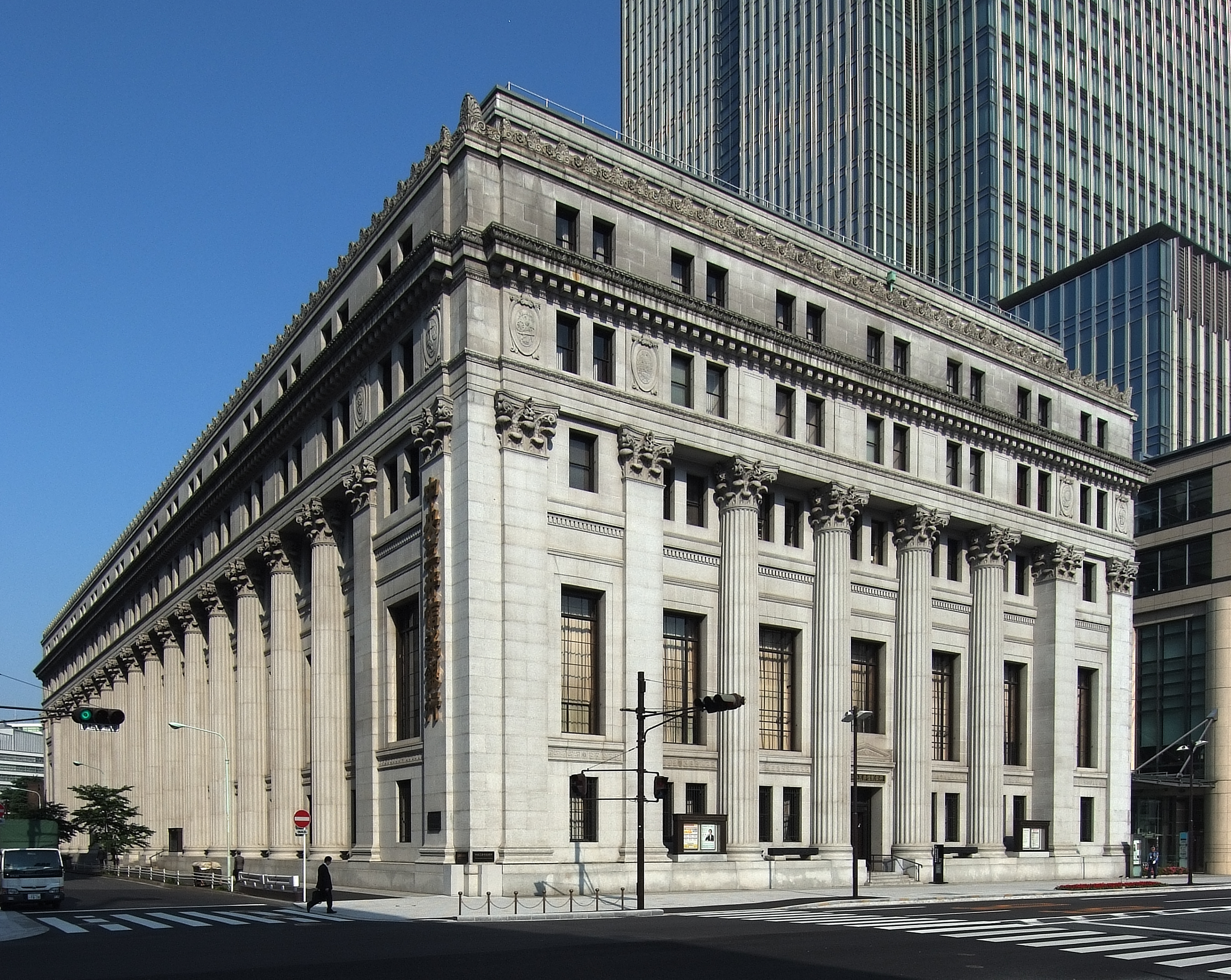
Mitsui Main Building, currently housing the Mitsui Memorial Museum

After the Meiji Restoration, the family switched allegiance to the Meiji government. In 1909, a Mitsui controlled holding company took over the business, with Mitsui thus becoming a zaibatsu of more than 150 companies operating financial, industrial and commercial industries.

=== Modern times ===
Today the Mitsui Group counts dozens of multinational companies in fields such as trade, banking, shipping, construction, mining, oil and gas, insurance, chemicals and real estate development. The main branches are:

- Mitsui & Company (a trading company)
- Sumitomo Mitsui Banking Corporation (the first private bank in Japan)
- Mitsui Engineering & Shipbuilding
- Mitsui O.S.K. Lines ('MOL')
- Mitsui Mining Company (formerly the largest coal producer in Japan)

== Controversy ==
During World War II several of the Mitsui group companies, including Mitsui-Miike mining, used Allied prisoners of war as slave labor, during which the prisoners were subjected to brutal treatment and torture, while some of them were permanently maimed by Mitsui employees. One of the surviving prisoners, United States citizen Lester Tenney, sued Mitsui in 1999 for punitive damages and compensation. Federal judge dismissed the case, citing the 1951 peace treaty between the U.S. and Japan that barred private claims against Japan.

By the end of the war the Mitsui group included more than 270 companies. After the group was dissolved by the occupation forces at the end of war, the companies started to reassociate again in 1950, creating a corporate grouping, or keiretsu.
