= Gofuku =

Japanese word

Gofuku (呉服) is a Japanese word meaning cloth (for Japanese clothes); kimono fabrics; textile; drapery; dry goods; or piece goods.

The word originated during the Yayoi period and literally means "Wu Kingdom clothes". "Gofuku" originally meant clothing made by weaving machines in Wu, China. Later, "gofuku" became a general term for silk fabrics, and was differentiated from "futomono" (太物) which referred to cotton and linen fabrics. By the end of the Edo period, "gofuku" came to be used as a general term for Japanese fabrics.

Kimono (着物), the traditional Japanese costume, is deeply influenced by ancient Chinese style of dress.

Gofuku no Hi (呉服の日) is an informal Japanese holiday that is celebrated on May 29 and is known as "Wear Kimono Day".
