= Mitsukoshi =

International department store chain with headquarters in Tokyo, Japan

Mitsukoshi, Ltd.; 株式会社三越

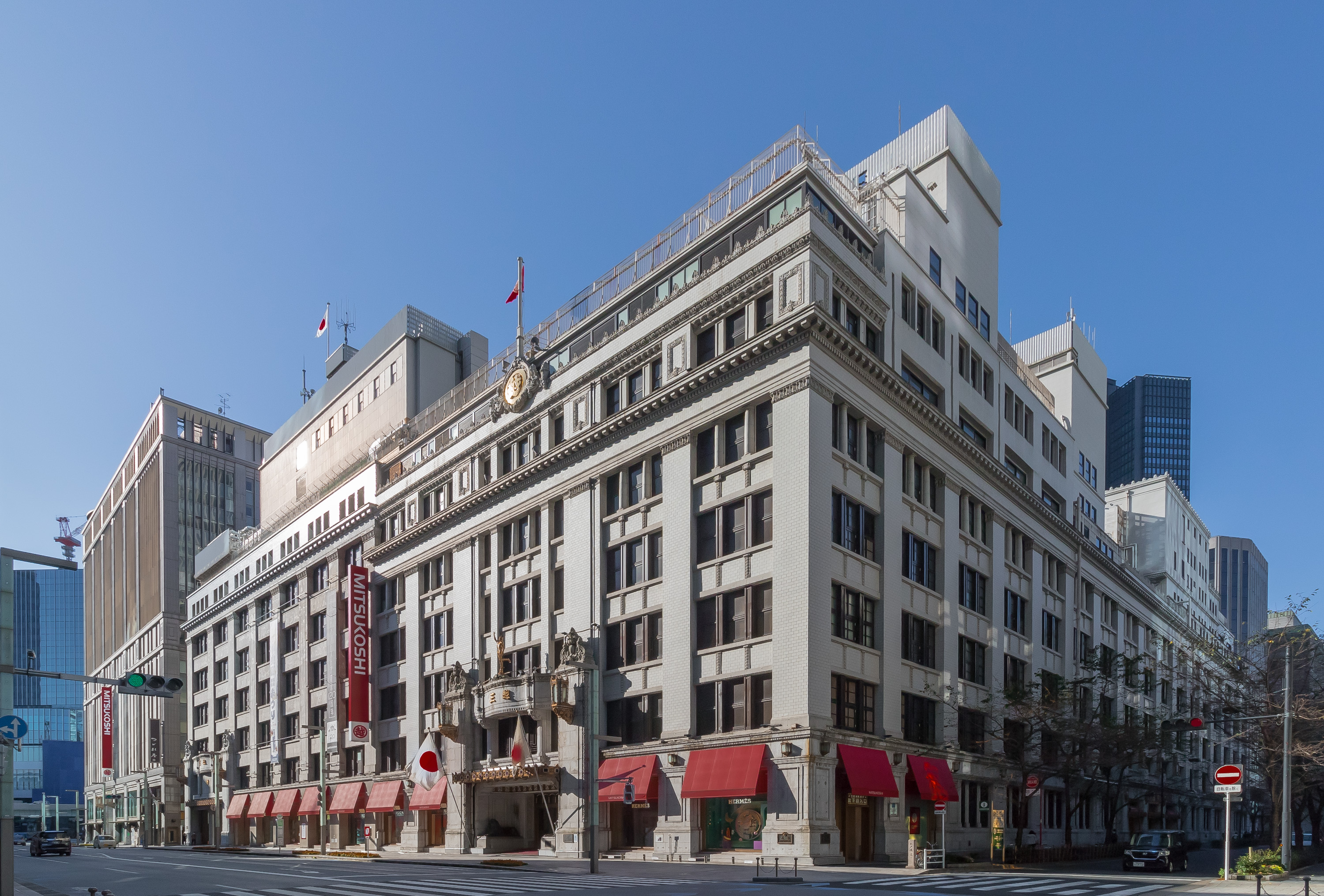
- Mitsukoshi main branch in Nihonbashi, originally built in 1914
- Type: Subsidiary (K.K.)
- Industry: Retail
- Founded: 1673; 353 years ago Edo Honmachi (Nihonbashi Hongokuchō, Chūō, Tokyo), Japan
- Founder: Mitsui Takatoshi
- Headquarters: 1-4-1 Nihonbashi-Muromachi, Chūō, Tokyo, Japan
- Parent: Isetan Mitsukoshi Holdings Ltd. (100%)
- Website: www.mitsukoshi.co.jp

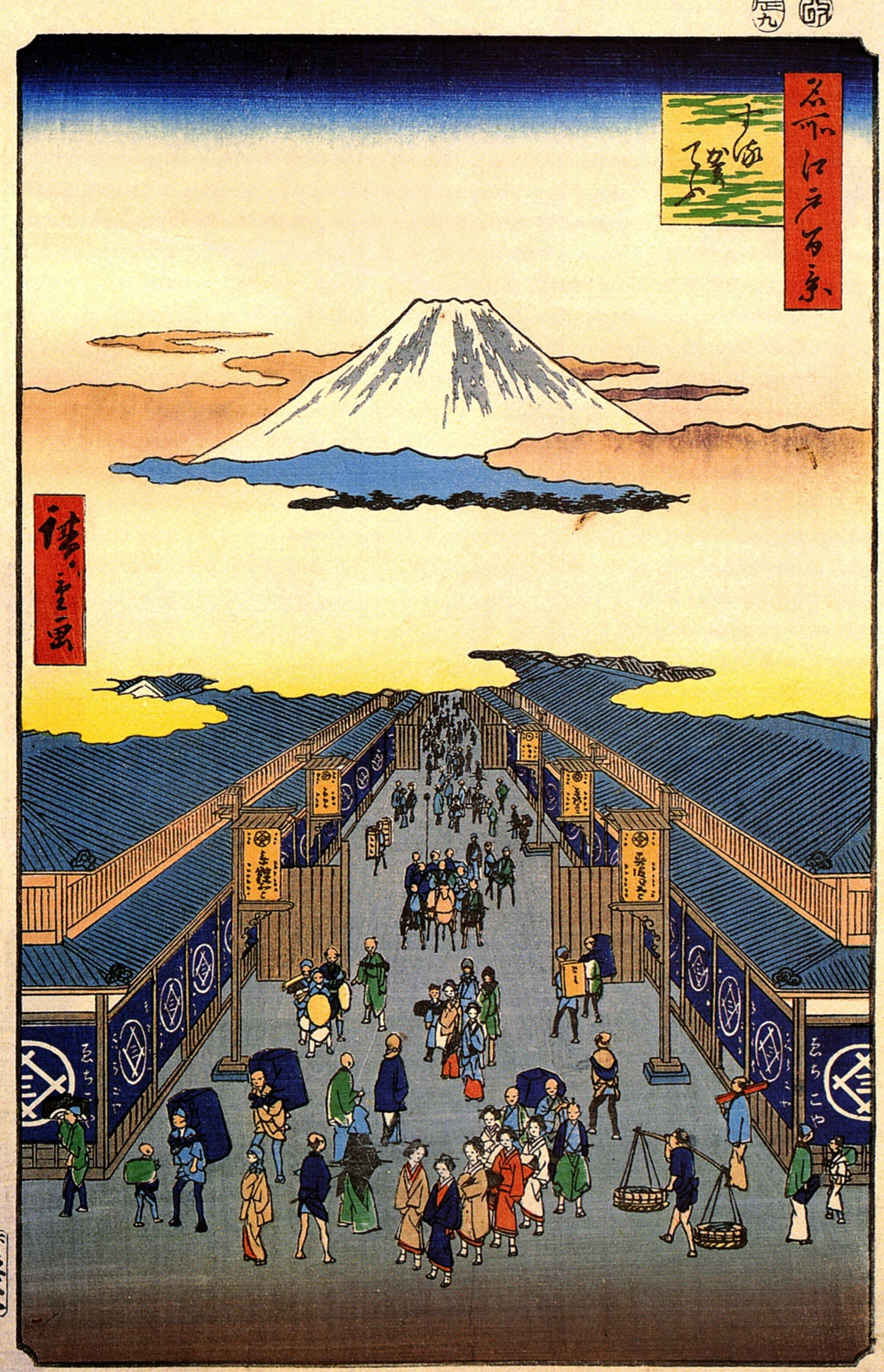
Utagawa Hiroshige designed an ukiyo-e print with Mount Fuji and Echigoya as landmarks. Echigoya is the former name of Mitsukoshi named after the former province of Echigo. The Mitsukoshi headquarters are located on the left side of the street.

Mitsukoshi, Ltd. (株式会社三越, Kabushiki gaisha Mitsukoshi) is an international department store chain with headquarters in Tokyo, Japan. Its holding company, Isetan Mitsukoshi Holdings, is a member of the Mitsui Group.

== History ==
It was founded in 1673 with the yagō (shop name) Echigo-ya (越後屋), selling kimono. Ten years later in 1683, Echigoya took a new approach to marketing. Instead of selling by going door-to-door, they set up a store where buyers could purchase goods on the spot with cash. Mitsukoshimae Station on the Tokyo Metro is named after the adjacent Mitsukoshi department store.

Mitsukoshi is the root of Mitsui group. In the 1970s, Mitsukoshi bought the Oriental Nakamura department store in Nagoya and re-branded them as Mitsukoshi Nagoya.

Genichiro Inokuma designed the wrapping paper in white and red.

In August 2007, it was announced that Mitsukoshi would merge into Isetan, a major department store in Japan. Mitsukoshi TYO: 2779 was unlisted on March 26, 2008, and on April 1, it merged with Isetan under a joint holding company called Isetan Mitsukoshi Holdings Ltd. (TYO: 3099).

On April 5, 2019, Mitsukoshi announced that it would further expand its Asian presence by having a Filipino branch established by 2021 at Bonifacio Global City, in Taguig, Metro Manila, Philippines. The store opened on November 18, 2022.

== Stores ==
=== Japan ===
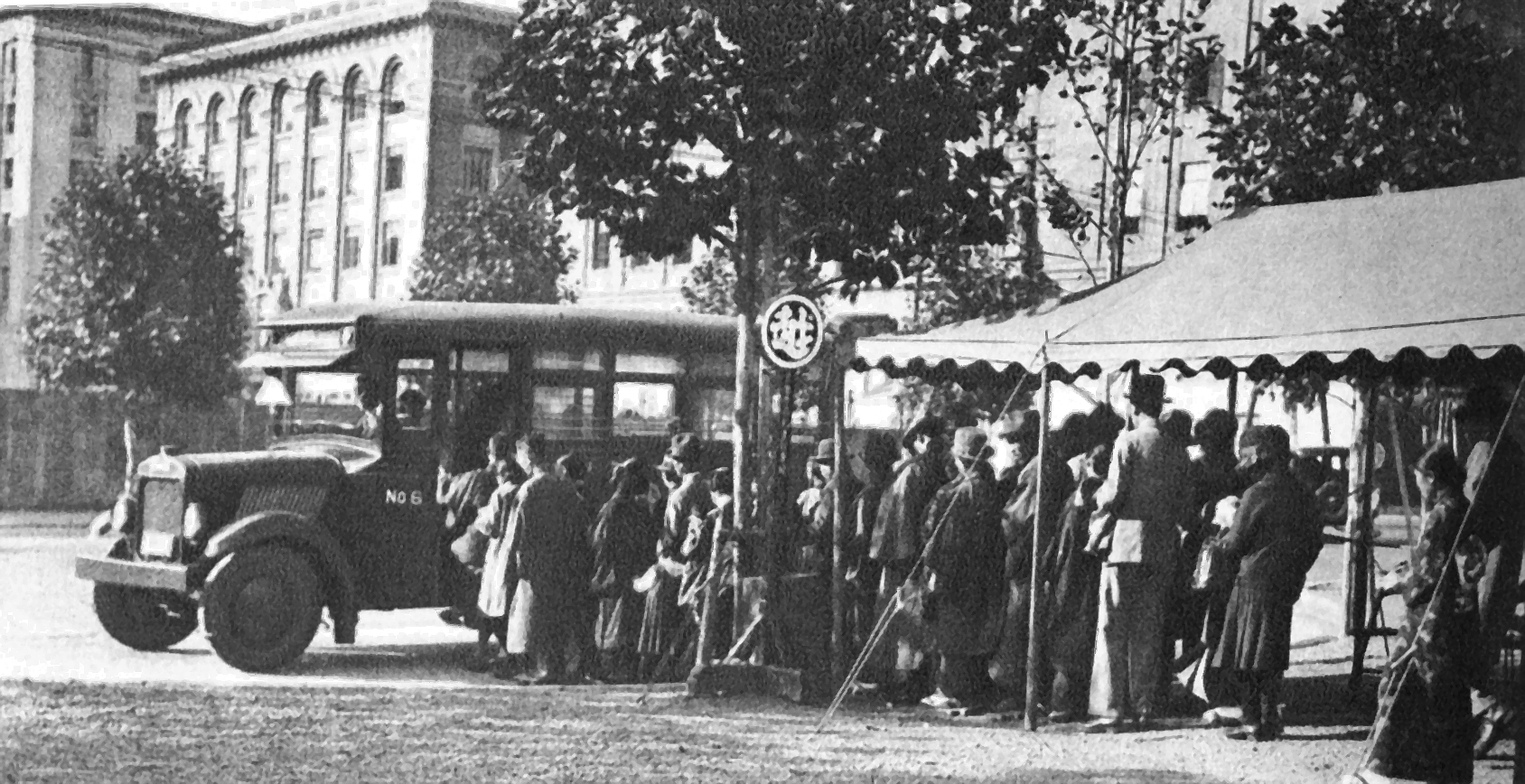
Courtesy bus for customers of Mitsukoshi's main store going to Tokyo station in 1932. Mitsukoshi was the first company to offer such a service in Japan.

==== Stores managed by Isetan Mitsukoshi Ltd. ====
- Nihonbashi Main Branch (Chūō, Tokyo) 日本橋本店
- Ginza Mitsukoshi (Chūō, Tokyo) 銀座三越

==== Stores managed by other companies ====
- Sapporo Store (Chūō-ku, Sapporo) 札幌店 - Sapporo Mitsukoshi Ltd.
- Sendai Store (Aoba-ku, Sendai) 仙台店 - Sendai Mitsukoshi Ltd.
- Nagoya Sakae Main Branch (Naka-ku, Nagoya) 名古屋栄本店 - Nagoya Mitsukoshi Ltd.
- Hoshigaoka Mitsukoshi (Chikusa-ku, Nagoya) 星ヶ丘三越 - Nagoya Mitsukoshi Ltd.
- Hiroshima Mitsukoshi (Naka-ku, Hiroshima) 広島三越 - Hiroshima Mitsukoshi Ltd.
- Takamatsu Mitsukoshi 高松三越 - Takamatsu Mitsukoshi Ltd.
- Matsuyama Mitsukoshi 松山三越 - Matsuyama Mitsukoshi Ltd.
- Fukuoka Mitsukoshi (Chūō-ku, Fukuoka) 福岡三越 - Iwataya Mitsukoshi Ltd.

==== Closed ====
- Shinjuku Mitsukoshi Alcott (Shinjuku, Tokyo) 新宿三越アルコット
- Ikebukuro Mitsukoshi (Toshima, Tokyo) 池袋三越 - closed May 2009
- Musashimurayama Mitsukoshi (Musashimurayama, Tokyo) 武蔵村山三越
- Kagoshima Mitsukoshi 鹿児島三越
- Tama Center Mitsukoshi (Tama, Tokyo) 多摩センター三越
- Chiba Mitsukoshi (Chūō-ku, Chiba) 千葉三越
- Niigata Mitsukoshi (Nishibori-dōri) 新潟三越 - Niigata Isetan Mitsukoshi Ltd.
- JR Osaka Isetan Mitsukoshi (Umeda, Kita-ku, Osaka) JR大阪三越伊勢丹
- Ebisu Mitsukoshi (Shibuya, Tokyo) 恵比寿三越 - closed February 2021

=== China ===
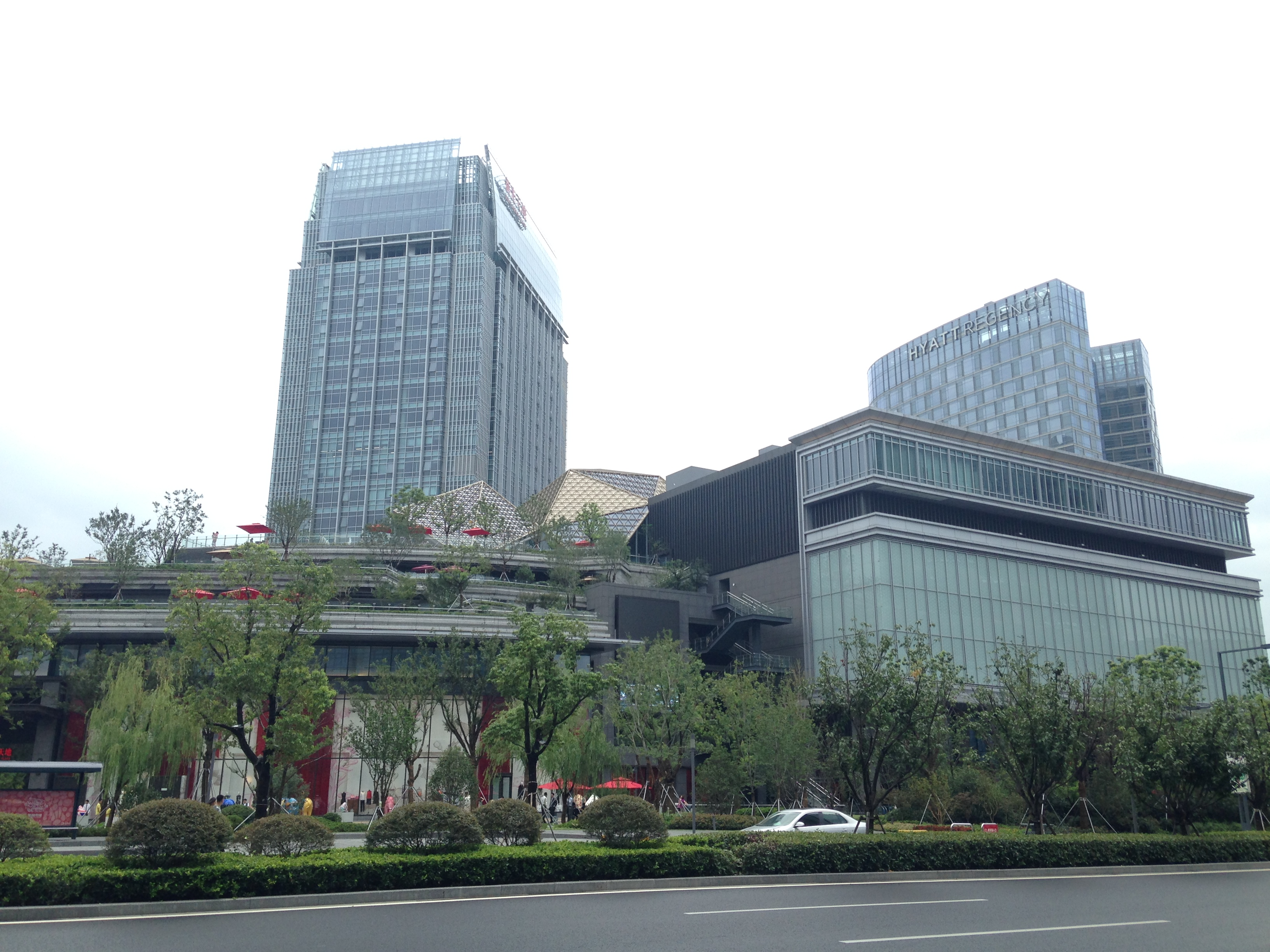
Shin Kong Place in Suzhou, Jiangsu

- Shanghai (Okura Garden Hotel)
- Shin Kong Mitsukosh, Suzhou (Shin Kong Place, Suzhou)
- Shin Kong Place (Chongqing)
- Shin Kong Place (Chengdu)

=== Philippines ===
- Taguig: Mitsukoshi BGC, a shopping mall at the Bonifacio Global City (November 18, 2022)

=== Taiwan ===
The stores in Taiwan are named Shin Kong Mitsukoshi Department Store, a collaboration between the Shin Kong Group and Mitsukoshi. The first Shin Kong Mitsukoshi store opened at Nanjing Road in Taipei in 1991.

The following branches are open as of 2022:

- Taipei:
  - Nanjing Road Store, with three buildings (1館, 2館, and 3館)
  - Xinyi New Life Square (信義新天地): 4 buildings (A4, A8, A9, and A11館)
  - Taipei Main Station Store (台北站前店)
  - Tianmu Store
- Taoyuan:
  - Dayou Road Store (大有店)
  - Taoyuan Station Store (站前店)
- Taichung:
  - Zhonggan Road Store (中港店)
- Chiayi:
  - Chuiyang Road Store (垂楊店)
- Tainan:
  - Zhongshan Road Store (中山店)
  - Ximen Road Store (西門店)
- Kaohsiung:
  - Sanduo Shopping District Store (三多店)
  - Zuoying District Store (左營店)

=== Thailand ===
- Bangkok: Mitsukoshi Depachika, One Bangkok, a supermarket and food hall that is hosted and operated by a joint venture company One Bangkok Mitsukoshi Ltd.

=== United States ===
- Walt Disney World (Orlando, Florida, United States) – hosted and operated by Mitsukoshi in the Japan Pavilion at Epcot's World Showcase.

=== Former stores ===
==== Asia ====
- China: The Dalian store closed at the end of the Second World War.
  - Hong Kong: The first Mitsukoshi in Hong Kong, covering 12000 sq meters on 4 levels, opened at 500 Hennessy Road, Causeway Bay on 26 August 1981. A second store opened in 1988 in the Sun Arcade in Tsim Sha Tsui, but it closed in 1995. Mitsukoshi closed its original Causeway Bay store on 17 September 2006, due to the redevelopment of Hennessy Centre.
- South Korea: In 1930, Mitsukoshi opened a department store (京城三越) in downtown Keijō (today Seoul). After the liberation of Korea and the defeat of Japan in 1945, Samsung took over this store and renamed it Shinsegae (신세계; lit. "New World").

==== Europe ====
- London (Piccadilly) - The London store opened in 1979 and closed in 2013.
- Paris - Opened in 1971 and closed in 2010.
- Rome - Opened in 1975 and closed in 2021.
- Milan
- Düsseldorf
- Frankfurt
- Munich

==== North America ====
- New York City - Mitsukoshi opened a 10,000 sq ft boutique and restaurant in rented space in the Ritz Tower apartment building at 57th Street and Park Avenue on March 16, 1979. In 1991, Mitsukoshi bought that space, as well as 30,000 sq ft of additional adjoining space, and opened a much larger outlet, which subsequently closed. Mitsukoshi opened a small popup store for one week only in SoHo during New York Fashion Week in February 2014.
