= Isetan Mitsukoshi Holdings =

Japanese holding company

Isetan Mitsukoshi Holdings Ltd.
- Native name: 株式会社三越伊勢丹ホールディングス
- Company type: Public (K.K)
- Traded as: TYO: 3099
- Founded: April 1, 2008; 18 years ago
- Headquarters: Shinjuku, Tokyo, Japan
- Products: Retail trade
- Revenue: ▼¥418 billion (2022)
- Operating income: ▼¥5.9 billion (2022)
- Net income: ▼¥12.3 billion (2022)
- Total assets: ▼¥1,168 billion (2022)
- Owner: The Master Trust Bank of Japan (11.20%); Shimizu Construction (1.63%); Wacoal (0.33%); Matsuya (0.18%); JR West (0.12%); Japan Airlines (0.10%); Shochiku (0.08%); Ichibata Electric Railway (0.01%)
- Number of employees: 9,691
- Subsidiaries: Isetan-Mitsukoshi Ltd.
- Website: imhds.co.jp

Isetan Mitsukoshi Holdings Ltd. (株式会社三越伊勢丹ホールディングス, Kabushiki-gaisha Mitsukoshi Isetan Hōrudingusu) (TYO: 3099) is a holding company with the Mitsukoshi and Isetan department stores as its wholly owned subsidiaries.

== Operations ==
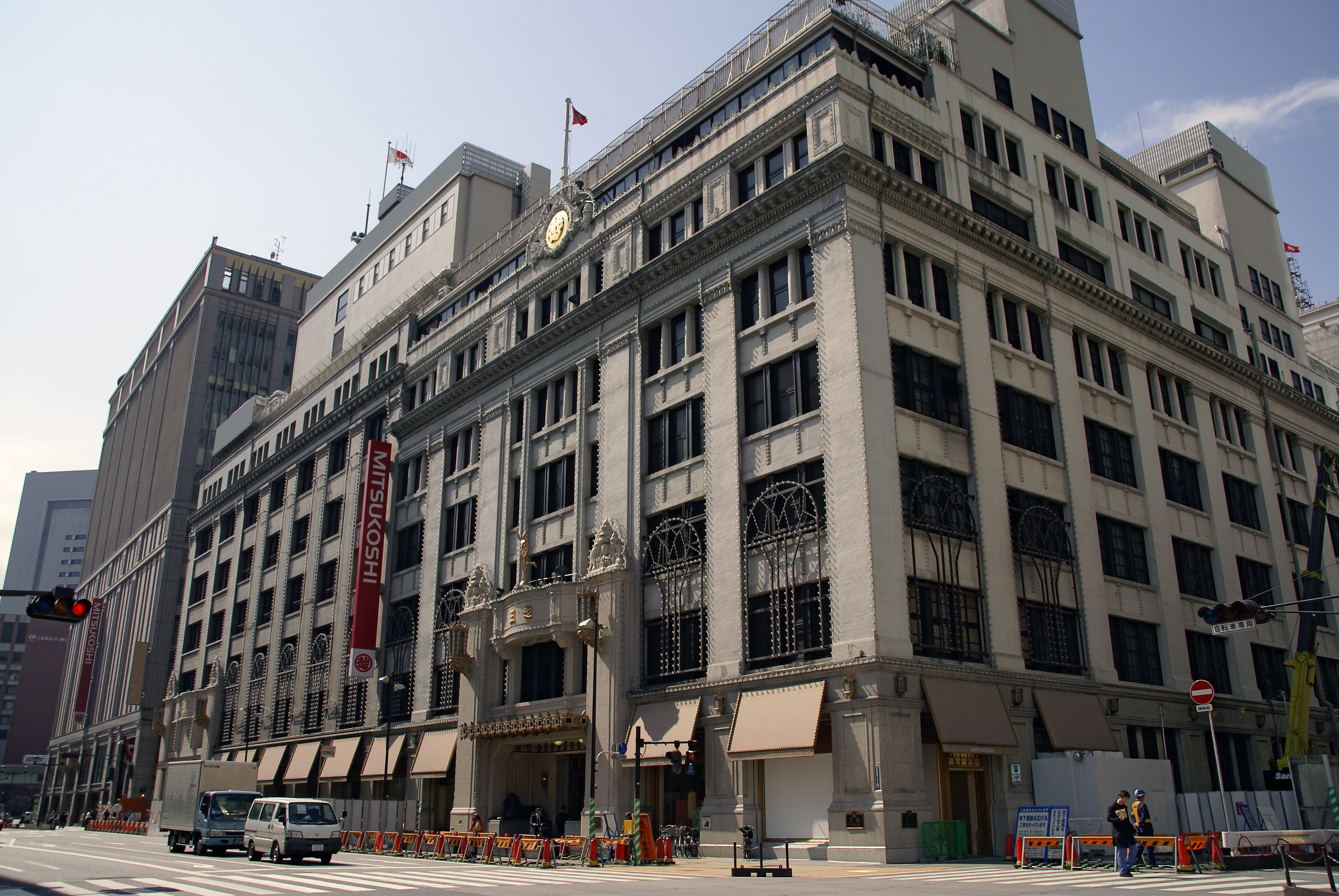
Mitsukoshi department store in Nihombashi, Chuo-ku, Tokyo, Japan

In August 2007, Isetan Co. Ltd. and Mitsukoshi Ltd. announced that the two companies "have agreed to merge and form a new holding company" in April 2008.

On 9 January 2010, Nobukazu Muto (b. 1945), the company's chairman and chief executive officer, died.

As of 2012, Hiroshi Onishi was the president and chief executive officer of Isetan Mitsukoshi Holding.

On 26 July 2013, the company announced that, in the first quarter of 2013, its net profits increased by 11.4 percent due to increased sales and lower expenses.
