= York-Benimaru =

Japanese supermarket chain

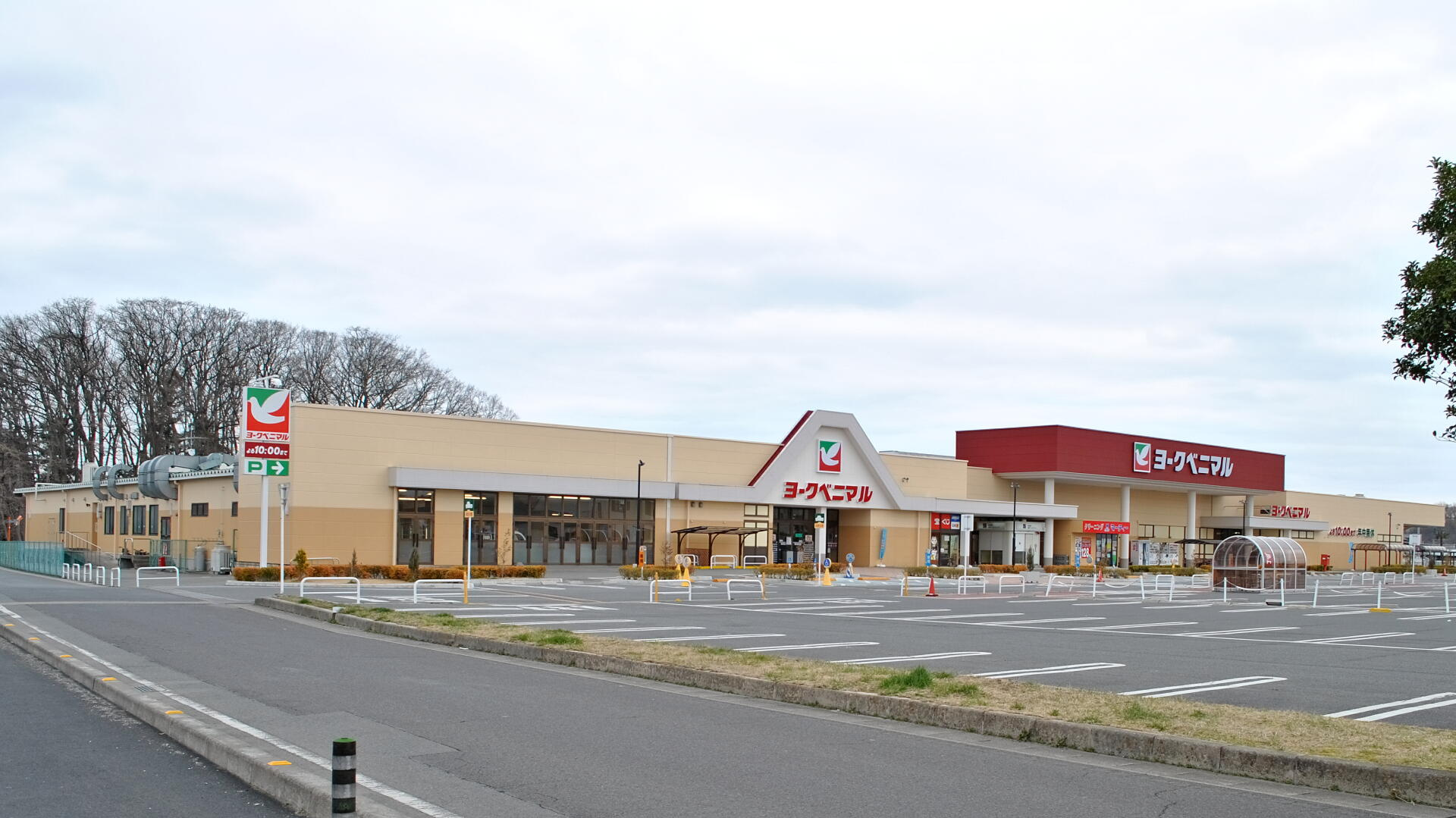
- York-Benimaru branch in Haramachi, Minamisoma, Fukushima Prefecture, 2010
- Founded: 1947; 79 years ago
- Area served: Japan
- Owner: Seven & I Holdings
- Website: yorkbenimaru.com

York-Benimaru (ヨークベニマル) is a Japanese supermarket chain. As of August 2022, the chain operates 244 branches across the southern Tōhoku region and northern Kantō region on the main island of Honshu. It was established in 1947, and is currently operated as a wholly owned subsidiary of Seven & I Holdings.

== History ==
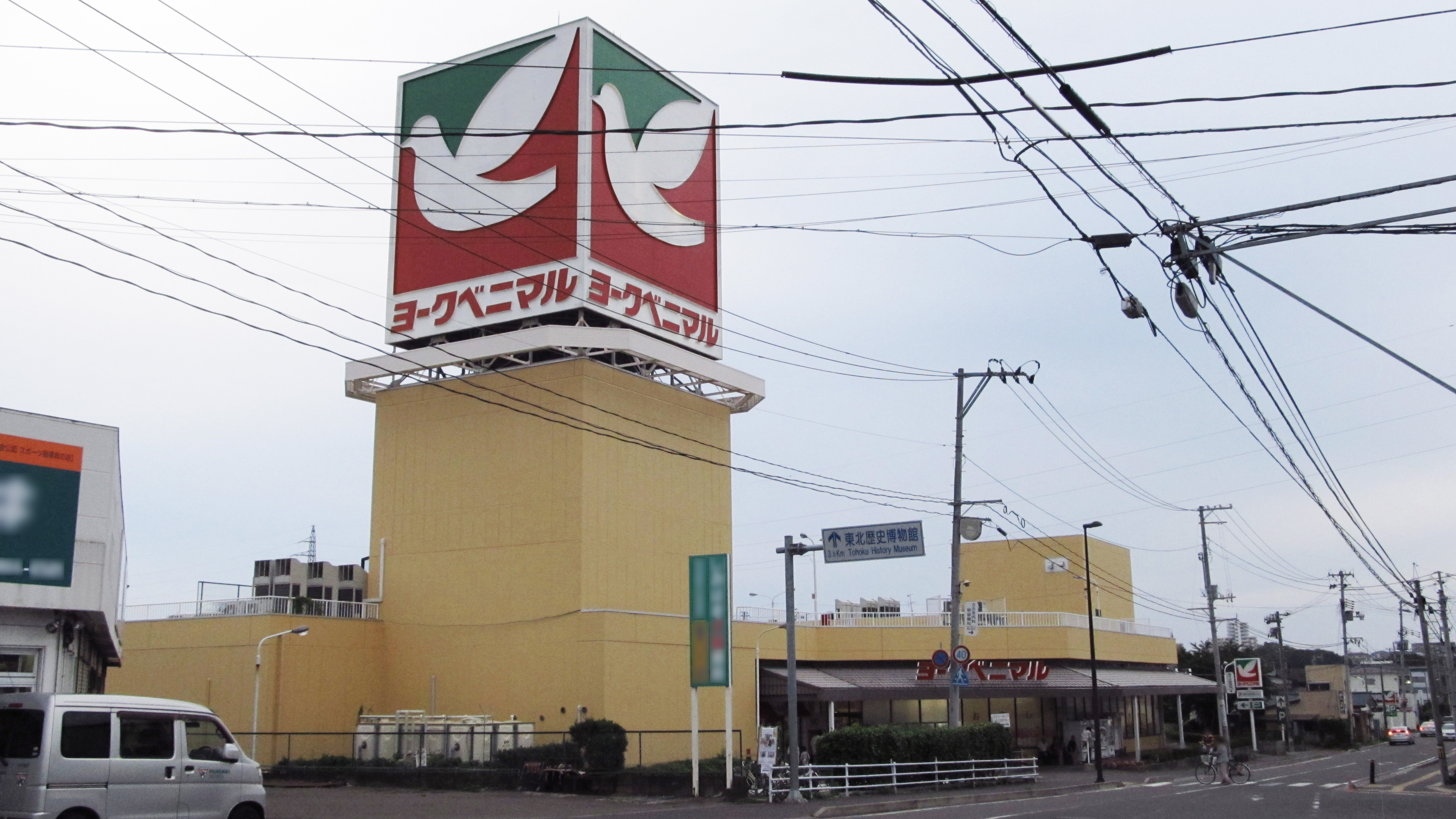
A branch of York-Benimaru in Shiogama, Miyagi Prefecture, pictured in 2014 prior to being renovated.

York-Benimaru was established on June 12, 1947 as Benimaru Shoten. It was incorporated into Seven & i Holdings in 2006 as a wholly owned subsidiary, having previously been part-owned by another subsidiary of the latter, Ito-Yokado. As a result of York-Benimaru's partnership with Ito-Yokado, the company features a 'Pigeon Mark' in its logo that bears a close resemblance to that used by Ito-Yokado.

=== Fundraising ===
Following the 2023 Turkey-Syria earthquake, both York-Benimaru and Seven & i Holdings announced on 9 February 2023 that the firm would be carrying out fundraising activities to raise money for the purpose of supplying aid to Turkish and Syrian communities affected by the earthquakes. Due to aftershocks from the earthquake continuing to occur, the fundraising period was later extended to March 12, 2023.
