= Toshifumi Suzuki =

Japanese business executive (1932–2026)

- 鈴木 敏文
- Suzuki in 2020
- Born: 1 December 1932; Sakaki, Nagano, Empire of Japan
- Died: 18 May 2026 (aged 93); Tokyo, Japan
- Occupation: Businessman
- Years active: 1963–2016
- Organization(s): Seven-Eleven Japan; Seven & i Holdings

Toshifumi Suzuki (鈴木 敏文, Suzuki Toshifumi; 1 December 1932 – 18 May 2026) was a Japanese businessman best known as the founder of Seven-Eleven Japan and widely regarded as the father of Japan’s convenience store industry. He was known as an innovator who introduced many features now considered a staple of the Japanese convenience store, such as in-store banking, ready-to-eat meals, fresh-brewed coffee and a data-driven business model.

Suzuki had been a businessman since the early 1970s, during which he brought the 7-Eleven franchise to Japan, and was the acting chairperson before his promotion to CEO and president.

== Biography ==
Suzuki was from Sakaki Town, Hanishina District, Nagano Prefecture. He graduated from Nagano Prefectural Yuda Higashi High School in March 1952.

Early in his career, Suzuki worked for book publisher Tokyo Shuppan Hanbai (now Tohan Corporation).

At the request of Masatoshi Ito, at the age of 31, Suzuki was transferred to Ito-Yokado, and in 1971 was appointed director of the company. He founded 7-Eleven Japan in the 1970s and simultaneously served as president of both companies, leading the group for nearly 40 years. In 1974, Mr. Suzuki partnered with Southland Corporation to open the first 7-Eleven in Japan, located in the Toyosu neighborhood of Tokyo. By 1976, Suzuki had overseen the opening of 100 more convenience stores across the country. Over the next 30 years, he opened thousands of additional 7-Elevens.

The company, under Suzuki's direction, introduced new innovations now considered standard in Japanese convenience stores, such as in-store banking, package shipment and fresh-brewed coffee, as well as premade rice balls and bento boxes.

In 2005, Seven-Eleven Japan fully acquired the company. Following the resignation of James W. Keyes, Suzuki was named the temporary successor to Keyes while the search for a replacement CEO and president continued.

Also in 2005, Suzuki established Seven & I Holdings, the parent holding company of 7-Eleven as well as other retail businesses. By 2015, 7-Eleven had over 55,000 stores across the world.

In 2016. amid a generational change in the Ito family, Suzuki announced his resignation after the board of directors rejected his proposal to remove president Ryuichi Isaka. He had served in this role since 5 November 2005..

On 25 May 2026, Seven & I Holdings announced that Suzuki had died on 18 May from heart failure. He was 93.
