= Zwanziger =

Zwanziger is a German, Austrian, and Ashkenazi Jewish surname. Notable people with the surname include:

- Anna Maria Zwanziger (1760–1811), German serial killer
- Christian Zwanziger (born 1987), German politician
- Gustav Adolf Zwanziger (1837–1893), Austrian journalist, botanist, and paleobotanist
- Daniel Zwanziger (born 1935), American theoretical physicist
- Theo Zwanziger (born 1945), German lawyer and sports official
- Ron Zwanziger (born 1954), American entrepreneur
