= ARTC =

ARTC may refer to:

- Army Recruit Training Centre, in Australia
- ArthroCare (NASDAQ: ARTC) is an American manufacturer of medical devices
- Atlanta Radio Theatre Company, an American theatre troupe
- Australian Rail Track Corporation, a government-owned corporation
- Automotive Research & Testing Center, a Taiwanese non-profit research lab
