= August 2006 Tokyo blackout =

Power outage in Japan

- Date: 14–15 August 2006
- Time: 7:38-0:54 JST
- Duration: from 59 minutes to 4 hours 6 minutes in some areas
- Location: Tokyo metropolitan area
- Cause: A ship crash into Koto electrical Line 78
- Deaths: None
- Injuries: None

On 14–15 August 2006, a major blackout occurred in the Tokyo metropolitan area, impacting 1.39 million households and multiple train lines in eastern Tokyo. It lasted from 7:38 to 0:54 JST. The blackout began when the boom of a crane ship owned by Mikuniya Construction crashed into the Koto Line 78 and 79 towers that ran across the Edo river, damaging electrical wires.

== Incident ==
On August 14, 2006, a crane ship owned by Mikuniya Construction was sailing near the border between Urayasu City in Chiba Prefecture and Edogawa ward in Tokyo on the Edogawa River. The ship's boom crashed in between the Koto Line 78 and 79 electrical power transmission towers at around 7:38 JST. Transmission between the two towers (the 275kV Koto Lines No. 1 and 2) was interrupted and disconnected, resulting in a power outage at all three substations in the Katsushika, Setagaya, and Edogawa wards of Tokyo.

The Edogawa substation was restored at 7:46 by grid switching, but at 7:58, the Shinagawa Thermal Power Plant, which had been isolated from the grid, automatically shut down due to an increase in demand resulting from a lack of supply capacity. Owing to this, the Koto ward and Jonan District substations completely lost power.

The outage was exacerbated by the substantial quantity of major companies that were on summer vacation at the time.

During the blackout, electricity demand was lower than usual even though it was a weekday (Monday). At 9:55, approximately 1 hour and 17 minutes later, all but two customers who were receiving high-voltage power had their power restored, and the remaining two customers' power was fully restored at 10:44, forty-nine minutes later. Afterwards, restoration work was carried out on the Koto Line, and power transmission was resumed on Lines 1 and 2 at 0:54 on the 17th.

Congestion occurred on mobile phones, and IP telephone service was temporarily interrupted. The Government of Japan has established an Information Liaison Office at the Crisis Management Center of the Prime Minister's Office.

Chiba Prefectural Police investigated the incident and considered potential charges of property damage and violations of the Electricity Business Law, but decided not to file charges in September of the same year as the accident was not an intentional act. On September 22 of the same year, the Yokohama Regional Marine Accident Inquiry Board applied for the commencement of a marine accident inquiry to the Yokohama Regional Marine Accident Inquiry Agency, and on March 1, 2007, the captain of the crane ship responsible for the work was given a two-month suspension of work. The captain of the tugboat that towed the crane ship was ordered to cease work for a month and a half, the crane operator was advised on corrective measures, and Mikuniya Construction was told to correct its guidance.

== Cause ==
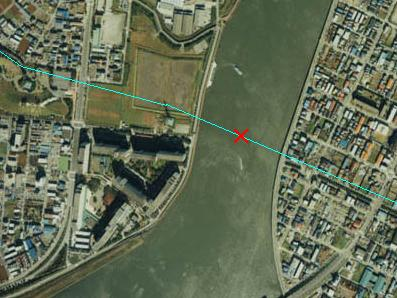
The damaged power line

According to investigations by Chiba Prefectural Police in the Urayasu Police Station, the 33-meter-long boom of a jib crane mounted on a crane ship (legally defined as a mobile crane) owned by Mikuniya Construction was designed to begin work immediately after arriving at a dredging site near Tokyo Disney Resort. As it was raised while being towed, it came into contact with a 275,000 volt (275 kV) power transmission line that crossed 16 meters above the water surface of the former Edo River, causing arcing and melting.

The damaged and fused power transmission lines were a part of the Koto Line, which connects the Shinkeiyo Substation in Funabashi City, Chiba Prefecture, the Koto Substation in Koto Ward, Tokyo, and the Eda Substation in Aoba Ward, Yokohama City. As a result of this accident, both the main line and the backup line were damaged in the 275,000-volt special high-voltage power transmission line.

== Impact ==
=== Government structures ===
At 8:30 a.m., the Japanese government held an internal briefing at the Prime Minister's Office Crisis Management Center. Chief Cabinet Secretary Shinzo Abe instructed the relevant ministries and agencies to investigate the cause. Meanwhile, the Nuclear and Industrial Safety Agency of the Ministry of Economy, Trade and Industry instructed the Tokyo Electric Power Company to investigate and report on the cause and scope of the impact, in accordance with the Electricity Business Act.

=== Households affected ===
The outage affected 974,000 households in the wards of Tokyo, 220,000 households in the northern part of Yokohama city and the western part Kawasaki city of the Kanagawa Prefecture, and 197,000 homes in parts of Urayasu and Ichikawa City in Chiba Prefecture, for a total of approximately 1,391,000 homes.

This was the second largest power outage, by number of households affected, in Japanese history, after the 2.8 million households that were affected during the major power outage in the Tokyo metropolitan area in July 1987. It was the fourth largest power outage ever in terms of electricity consumption.

=== Railway ===
Train service was suspended for a period of time in all areas affected by the power outage, affecting the travel of approximately 345,000 people.

- JR East's Keiyo Line: Service was suspended for approximately 20 minutes. 10 trains on both lines were suspended, and 20 trains were delayed by up to 42 minutes, affecting approximately 19,000 people. As the company sourced most of its electricity from its own power plants, the impact was minor.
- Tokyo Metro: Train service for the Ginza Line, Hibiya Line, Tōzai Line, and Hanzōmon Line was suspended for up to 1 hour and 10 minutes, affecting approximately 103,000 people.
- Toei Subway: Service was suspended on Shinjuku Line, Asakusa Line, and Mita Line.
- Yokohama Municipal Subway: Service was suspended for approximately 10 minutes from 7:40. on Lines 1 and 3 (now the Blue Line).
- Yurikamome: Service was suspended from the time of the power outage until 10:30. When trains stopped between stations, such as on the Rainbow Bridge, passengers were guided by staff to disembark onto the tracks and move on foot.
- Even after power was temporarily restored in some areas, transportation systems were forced to operate with reduced air-conditioning capacity.

=== Roads ===
Traffic lights were shut down at 440 locations in Tokyo's 23 wards and 118 locations in Chiba Prefecture. Police officers from the Metropolitan Police Department and Chiba Prefectural Police were in charge of directing traffic at intersections.

=== Businesses ===
Due to the suspension of public transportation, many employees were late to work. Many stations and office buildings also lost power, leaving many companies and offices unable to carry out their work. However, since many businesses were on the so-called "Obon holiday" that day, the damage was less than if a power outage had occurred on a normal weekday.

Approximately 200 7-Eleven convenience stores and 30 Lawson stores were affected.

=== Communications ===
About 300 indoor base stations installed by cellular companies were put out of service by the outage, causing mobile phone congestion.

Nippon Broadcasting System's Kisarazu transmitting station was unable to operate due to a power outage, so the company switched to transmitting from its backup Adachi transmitting station and continued broadcasting.

=== Manufacturing industry ===
The Oji Paper Company's plant in the Edogawa Ward, Tokyo, took about ten hours to restore operations due to the shutdown. Nisshin Steel's Ichikawa Works in Ichikawa City of the Chiba Prefecture, was also halted for a while.

=== Financial institutions ===
Although the Tokyo Stock Exchange continued trading as normal, the Nikkei Stock Average could not be calculated. This was blamed on a glitch in the relevant computer system caused by the blackout. Approximately 1,000 automated ATMs in the Tokyo metropolitan area and two prefectures were temporarily suspended. It took Seven Bank, which had ATMs in 7-Eleven stores, two and a half hours to restore operations.

=== Other ===
The power outage caused elevators to stop working, resulting in over seventy cases of people becoming trapped inside. Tokyo Disney Resort delayed the opening of the park by about fifty minutes and temporarily suspended its attractions. Water was temporarily cut off in Chiba Prefecture, and tap water became cloudy in some areas of Tokyo. Multiple construction projects were also halted.

== Power restoration ==
Some power transmission was restored at 8:37 am, 59 minutes after the power outage occurred. However, there was still a continued outage due to malfunction in some power distribution equipment. Thanks to power rerouting most areas received power at 10:44 am, four hours and six minutes after the initial power outage.

The Koto line 78 tower was repaired at 0:54 on August 17, 2006.
