= Smith & Nephew =

Medical equipment manufacturing company based in Watford, England

Smith & Nephew plc

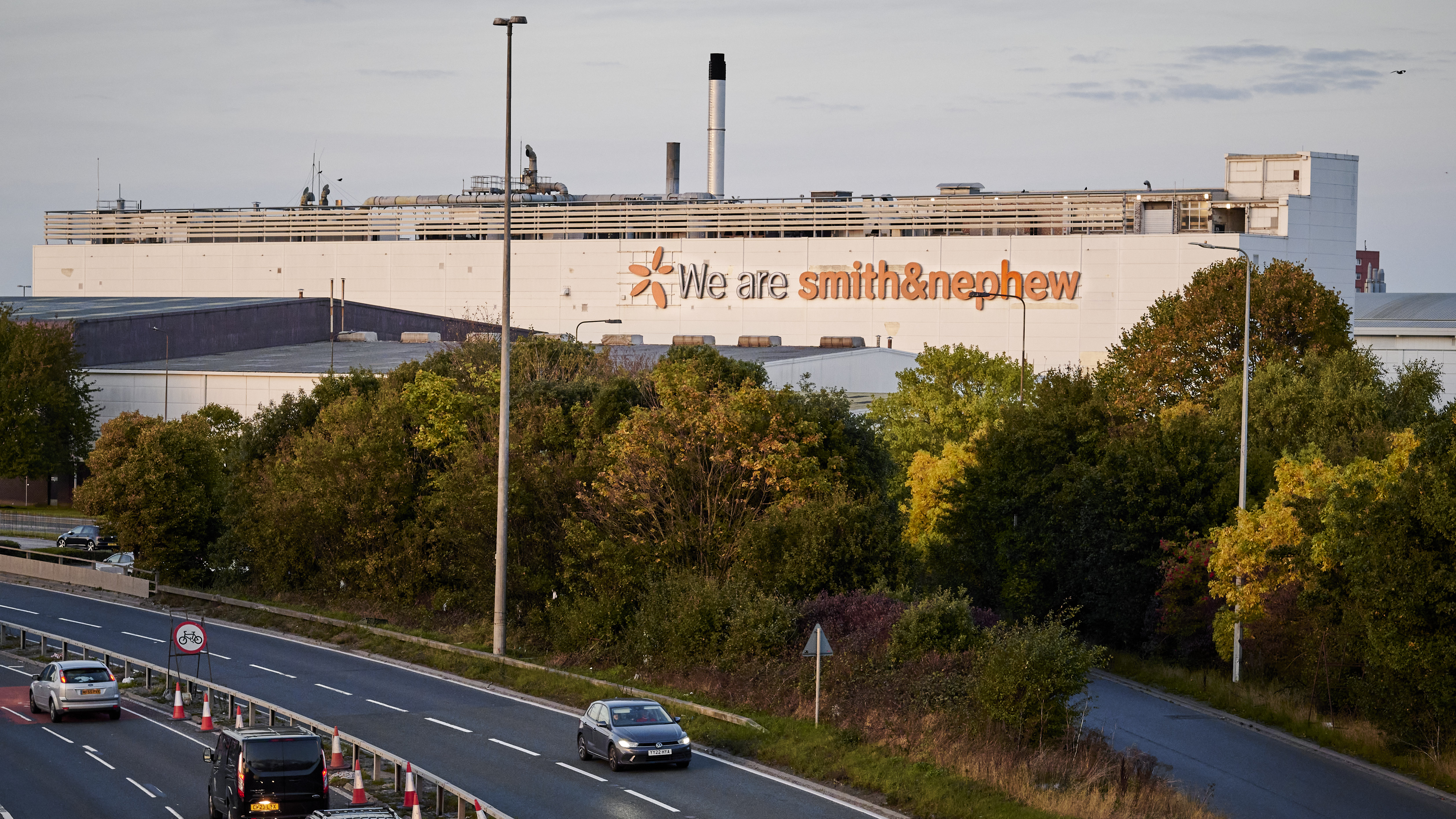
- Factory in Kingston upon Hull, UK
- Type: Public limited company
- Traded as: LSE: SN. NYSE: SNN; FTSE 100 Component
- Industry: Medical equipment
- Founded: 1856; 170 years ago (Kingston upon Hull)
- Founder: Thomas James Smith
- Headquarters: Watford, England
- Key people: Rupert Soames (Chairman); Dr Deepak Nath (CEO)
- Products: Medical equipment
- Revenue: ▲$6,164 million (2025)
- Operating income: ▲$794 million (2025)
- Net income: ▲$625 million (2025)
- Number of employees: 18,000 (2025)
- Website: www.smith-nephew.com

Smith & Nephew plc, also known as Smith+Nephew, is a British multinational medical equipment manufacturing company headquartered in Watford, England. It is an international producer of advanced wound management products, arthroscopy products, trauma and clinical therapy products, and orthopaedic reconstruction products. Its products are sold in over 100 countries. It is listed on the London Stock Exchange and is a constituent of the FTSE 100 Index.

== History ==
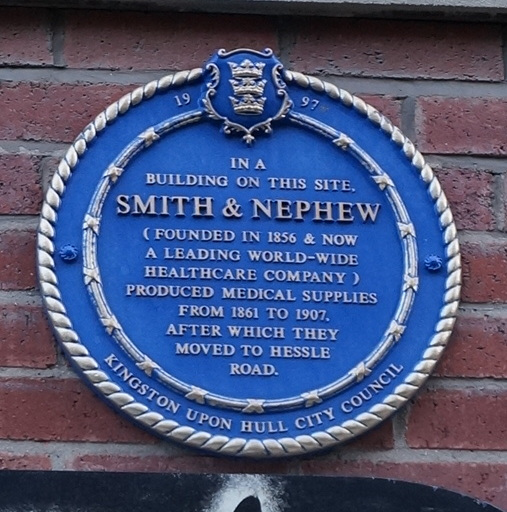
Blue plaque of original site

The company was founded in 1856 by Thomas James Smith of Kingston upon Hull who went into business as a dispensing chemist. One early product line that the firm specialised in was cod liver oil; by 1858, it had effectively shifted from retail to wholesale to supply cod liver oil (and other productions) to hospitals, dispensaries, and the wider medical profession.

A few months before his death in 1896, Smith was joined by his nephew, Horatio Nelson Smith, at which point the business became known as T. J. Smith and Nephew. Horatio reoriented the firm from cod liver oil in favour of other products; during 1904, it started producing and supplying bandages and surgical dressings. This new product line experienced high demand following the outbreak of the First World War during 1914, during which its dressings were routinely used to treat wounded soldiers.

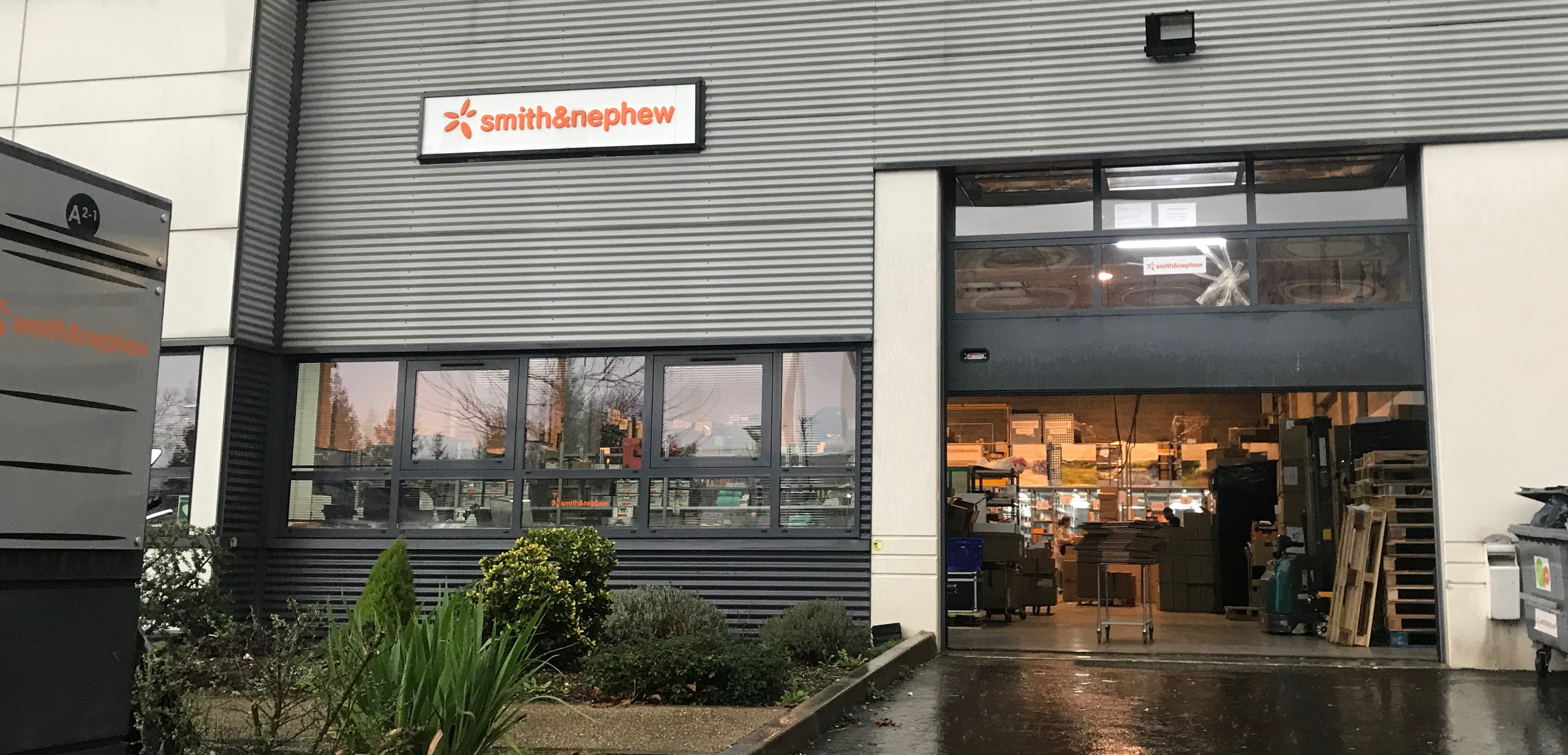
Facility in Gennevilliers, France

It was amid this war that Horatio met with the French President, Raymond Poincaré, after which the company received its largest-ever order after it was awarded a contract valued at £350,000 to supply both surgical and field dressings, which it successfully fulfilled within five months. The firm would ultimately supply the armies of Britain, France, Belgium, Serbia and America, as well as the American Red Cross, during the conflict. The business expanded from 50 to 1,200 staff to fulfil the heavy demands of wartime, but encountered hardship due to a slump in demand that occurred shortly after the conflict's end in 1918.

During the early interwar period, Smith & Nephew was restructured into a professionally-managed multidivisional business. This organisational change came alongside an increased focus on textile-based products, which led to the business diversifying into women’s underwear, first aid kits, and sanitary towels; it also started acquiring licenses to market and produce products such as Gypsona, a plaster-of-paris-based bandage, and the Elastoplast range of bandages. Such product lines provided the basis of the company’s commercial growth throughout the 1920s, 1930s and 1940s.

In 1937, it was listed on the London Stock Exchange. In the aftermath of the Second World War, the company opted to diversify into cosmetics, hypodermic syringes and needles, and pharmaceuticals. During 1951, Smith & Nephew acquired Herts Pharmaceuticals along with its antitubercular treatment and its research department. However, competitive pressure following the entry of large American pharmaceutical companies into the British market led to sales revenue declining throughout the early 1950s.

In spite of the postwar diversification efforts, the core business activities of Smith & Nephew remained the production and provision of textiles, dressings, and sanitary towels. During the 1940s and 1950s, the company had consolidated and developed these areas through a combination of rationalization and investment. The late 1950s and early 1960s saw considerable disruption as textiles gave way to plastics; Smith & Nephew responded with the production of a plastic bandage (known as 'Airstrip'), a polyurethane surgical dressing (marketed as 'OpSite'), and a plastic netting that was used in clothing, dressings, horticulture, sanitary towels, and biomedical filters (named 'Net 909').

During 1968, Smith & Nephew was approached by Unilever in an ultimately unsuccessful bid to merge the two firms. Between 1976 and 1990, Kenneth Kemp served as chairman of the firm. By 1977, Smith & Nephew acquired the pump manufacturer Watson-Marlow Pumps; 13 years later, it was sold on to Spirax-Sarco Engineering. In 1986, the firm acquired Richards Medical Company, a US-based specialist in orthopaedic products in exchange for £201 million. While Smith & Nephew broke into the US market during the 1980s, its potential for growth there was somewhat constrained by the terms of licensing agreements which excluded many of its top-selling products from the region.

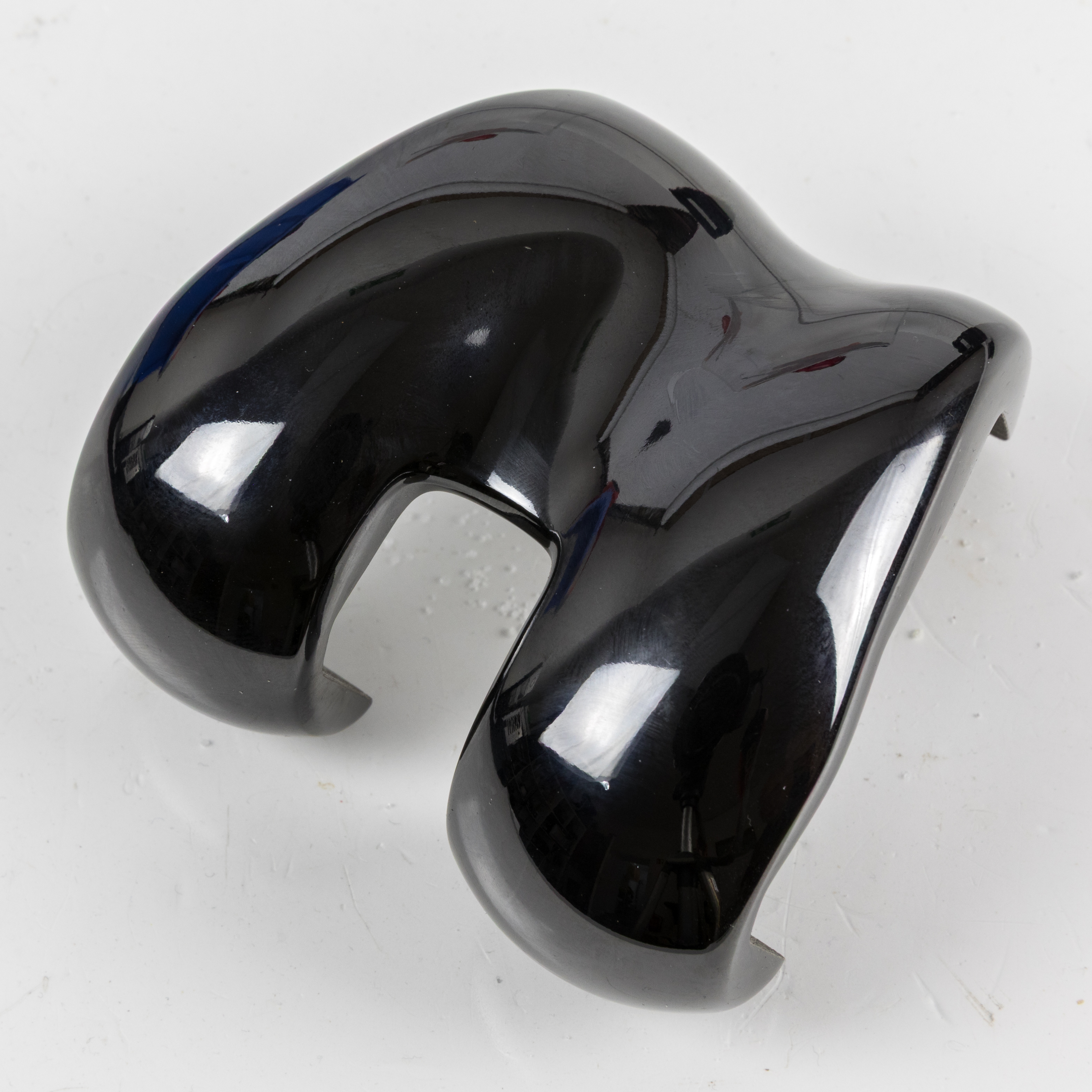
Journey II knee prosthesis

During the late 1990s and early 2000s, under the leadership of CEO Chris O'Donnell, Smith & Nephew was reorganised around a focus on artificial joints, endoscopy tools and dressings grafted from human skin. As a part of this reorganisation, several long-standing brands, including Elastoplast, Nivea soap, and Lillets tampons, were divested to other companies, although their sale was typically opposed by the descendants of the Smith family, some of which still held shares in the business. Following this restructuring, it comprised three primary areas of business: wound management, endoscopy and orthopaedics. In 2001, the firm became a constituent of the FTSE 100 Index.

During February 2002, Smith & Nephew acquired Oratec Interventions, a surgical devices business, in exchange for $310 million in cash. Two years later, it purchased Midland Medical Technologies, a hip resurfacing business, for £67 million. In April 2007, the company acquired Plus Orthopedics, a Swiss orthopedics business, for $889 million; one month later, it also bought BlueSky, an American-based wound care business, for $110 million.

During December 2012, the company acquired Healthpoint Biotherapeutics, a specialist in the bioactives area of advanced wound management, in exchange for $782 million. In February 2014, Smith & Nephew announced the purchase of ArthroCare for $1.7 billion in cash in a move that was viewed as broadening the company's sports medicine range for minimally invasive surgery by moving the company into the Ear, Nose & Throat market. During October 2015, the firm announced the acquisition of Blue Belt Technologies (led by Eric Timko) for US$275 million, securing a leading position in the growing sector of orthopaedic robotics-assisted surgery.

In March 2019, Smith & Nephew announced the acquisition of orthopedic joint reconstruction business unit of Brainlab to further its foray into robotic surgery. Three months later, the firm acquired Atracsys Sàrl, the Switzerland-based provider of optical tracking technology used in computer-assisted surgery.

During May 2018, Namal Nawana was appointed CEO of the firm. Shortly thereafter, there was a shareholder revolt over executive pay. During October 2019, Smith & Nephew announced that Nawana would stand down as CEO "because his requests for higher pay, in line with the packages awarded by US medical device-makers, could not be met under UK corporate governance standards". He was replaced by Roland Diggelmann.

During January 2021, the company acquired Integra LifeSciences’ extremity orthopaedics business for $240 million. One year later, the firm purchased the Florida-based partial knee implant company, Engage Surgical in exchange for $135 million.

During 2022, it was announced that Smith & Nephew was to relocate from Hull, where it has been based since its establishment in 1856, to a new-build 23-acre site in Melton that would house research and development, manufacturing and office space under an £80 million project. That same year, Roland Diggelmann was replaced as CEO by Dr Deepak Nath. In October 2024, the company announced revised plans, citing increased costs. The more recent scenario includes retaining certain operational facilities at the Hull base, in addition to building the new site in Melton.

== Operations ==
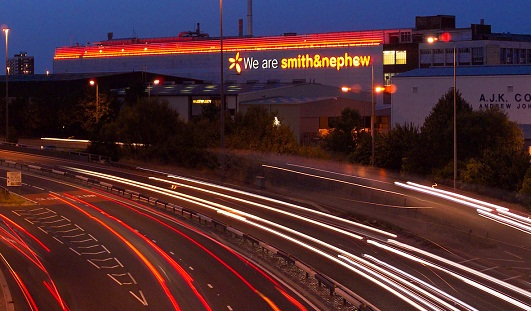
The Smith and Nephew factory in Kingston upon Hull, United Kingdom

Smith & Nephew operates in three market segments through separate global business units under the Smith & Nephew brand name:

- Advanced wound management: advanced treatments for difficult wounds.
- Sports Medicine & ENT: products for minimally invasive surgery, based in Andover, Massachusetts, USA.
- Orthopaedics: hip, knee, and extremities implants and trauma products, based in Memphis, Tennessee, USA.

== Controversies ==
In September 2007, Biomet Inc., DePuy Orthopaedics Inc. (part of Johnson & Johnson), Smith & Nephew PLC and Zimmer Holdings Inc. entered into settlement agreements, under which they agreed to pay $300 million in total, adopt industry overhauls and undertake corporate monitoring to avoid criminal charges of conspiracy.

In February 2012, Smith & Nephew plc agreed to pay US$22.2 million to settle multiple US Foreign Corrupt Practices Act (FCPA) offenses committed by its US and German subsidiaries. Under the new agreements Smith & Nephew PLC paid $5.4 million in restitution and interest to settle the SEC's civil charges. Its US subsidiary Smith & Nephew Inc. paid a $16.8 million criminal fine. The company admitted to having bribed government-employed doctors in Greece to use its medical equipment over the past decade. The company entered into a deferred prosecution agreement with the US Department of Justice (DOJ) and agreed to retain a compliance monitor for 18 months.

== Awards ==
Awards include:

- Manufacturer of the Year in 2007
- Smith & Nephew Advanced Wound Management won Logistics and Supply Chain Manufacturer Award 2006
- ASM International 2005 Engineering Materials Achievement Award for Smith & Nephew's trademarked oxinium technology
- Smith & Nephew's Back Pain Study Receives Outstanding Paper Award at North American Spine Society 2003 Annual Meeting

== Books ==
- Foreman-Peck, J. (1995), Smith & Nephew in the Health Care Industry, Edward Elgar.
