= Olivier Bohuon =

French businessman

- Born: Olivier Jean Bohuon; 3 January 1959 (age 67); Paris, France
- Died: 5 May 2024
- Education: HEC Paris; University of Paris-Sud
- Occupation: Businessman
- Years active: 1970–present
- Title: CEO, Smith & Nephew plc
- Term: 2011–2018
- Predecessor: David Illingworth
- Successor: Namal Nawana
- Spouse: Alexandra Polliot
- Children: 3

Olivier Jean Bohuon (3 January 1959 - 5 May 2024) was a French businessman. He was the chief executive (CEO) of Smith & Nephew plc, a British multinational medical equipment manufacturing company.

== Early life ==
Olivier Bohuon was born on 3 January 1959 in Paris. He is the son of Claude Bohuon and Odile Guinnebault.

Bohuon earned a doctorate in pharmacy from University of Paris-Sud in 1982 and a master in business administration from HEC Paris in 1985.

== Career ==
Bohuon was the chief executive of Smith & Nephew plc and Smith & Nephew Inc from April 2011 until May 2018. He was the chief executive of Laboratoires Pierre Fabre from September 2010. Before that, he worked for Abbott Laboratories from 2003 to July 2010, rising to executive vice president, pharmaceutical products.

Bohuon was senior vice president, director of European commercial operations at GlaxoSmithKline from 2001 to 2003. He was CEO and then president of SmithKline Beecham France from 1995 to 2001. He was the marketing director and then the operations director of Glaxo France from 1991 to 1995. He worked for Abbott Laboratories from 1988 to 1991.

Bohuon was a director of HealthCare Promise Investments Partners SA (Luxembourg). He was a member of the supervisory board at Virbac SA. He was a member of the National Pharmacy Academy and the Academy of Technologies. Since August 2018, Bohuon was vice chairman of healthcare and pharma company LEO Pharma.

Bohuon became a Knight of the Legion of Honour in 2007.

== Personal life ==
Bohuon married Alexandra Polliot in 1981. They have two sons and a daughter.

In February 2016, Smith & Nephew said Bohuon had a "highly treatable form of cancer." He died in May 2024.
