= Shareholder rebellion =

Action by corporate shareholders against management

Shareholder rebellion occurs when the owners of a corporation work to throw out management or oppose their decisions. Shareholder rebellion may occur at an annual general meeting or through a proxy battle. Shareholders may also threaten to collapse a firm's stock price through concentrated selling.

Rebellions commonly arise over executive compensation, the composition of the board of directors, major corporate transactions, and environmental and social policy. According to some analysts, institutional shareholders were historically lax about holding management accountable because they concentrated on picking correct stocks rather than protecting their interests in the stocks they owned.

Shareholder revolts have become more common, with a record number of advisory "Say on Pay" votes in the United States failing to win majority support in 2018.

== History ==
On 24 January 1609, Amsterdam-based businessman Isaac Le Maire filed a petition against the Dutch East India Company (VOC), marking the first recorded expression of shareholder activism or shareholder rebellion.

== Examples ==
=== Executive compensation ===
Advisory shareholder votes on executive pay, known as "say on pay", were introduced in the United Kingdom by the Directors' Remuneration Report Regulations 2002 and in the United States by the Dodd–Frank Act of 2010. Australia adopted a "two strikes" rule in 2011, under which a vote of 25 per cent or more against a company's remuneration report at two consecutive annual general meetings allows shareholders to vote on whether to spill the board.

At its annual meeting on 19 May 2003, GlaxoSmithKline became the first British company whose remuneration report was rejected by shareholders under the 2002 regulations. The protest centred on severance arrangements for chief executive Jean-Pierre Garnier that shareholder groups valued at up to £22 million; the vote was not binding.

In 2010, shareholder rebellions occurred over executive compensation at Cable and Wireless and Shell; Shell in response unveiled a plan to curb executive compensation and bonuses.

A series of pay revolts at British companies in 2012 was described in the press as a "shareholder spring". Aviva shareholders voted 54 per cent against the insurer's remuneration report on 3 May 2012, and chief executive Andrew Moss resigned five days later; in the same period AstraZeneca chief executive David Brennan announced his retirement, Trinity Mirror chief executive Sly Bailey stepped down ahead of a revolt over her pay, and about a third of Barclays shareholders opposed that bank's pay awards. In the United States, 55 per cent of Citigroup shareholders voted against the bank's executive pay plan at its annual meeting on 17 April 2012, an unusual outcome for a large financial institution.

In April 2016, BP shareholders voted 59.11 per cent against a remuneration report that included a US$19.6 million package for chief executive Bob Dudley, a 20 per cent increase in a year in which the company reported a US$6.5 billion loss. Chairman Carl-Henric Svanberg told the meeting "we hear you". BP cut the chief executive's package by about 40 per cent the following year.

Following the Royal Commission into Misconduct in the Banking, Superannuation and Financial Services Industry, 88 per cent of National Australia Bank shareholders voted against the bank's remuneration report in December 2018, reported as the largest such vote against an Australian company; Westpac recorded 64.2 per cent against and the Australia and New Zealand Banking Group 34 per cent.

At the annual general meeting of the Australian airline Qantas on 3 November 2023, 82.98 per cent of votes were cast against the company's remuneration report, a first strike under the two strikes rule and described as one of the largest such votes in Australian corporate history; about 34 per cent of votes were cast against the re-election of director Todd Sampson. The vote followed proceedings brought by the Australian Competition and Consumer Commission alleging that the airline had sold tickets for flights it had already decided to cancel, for which it was later penalised A$100 million, and a High Court of Australia ruling in September 2023 that its 2020 outsourcing of about 1,700 ground staff had been unlawful. Chairman Richard Goyder had announced in October 2023 that he would step down, and was succeeded by John Mullen in 2024. In August 2024 the board withheld A$9.26 million of former chief executive Alan Joyce's remuneration after a governance review found that "mistakes were made by the board and management" and that a "command and control" leadership style had contributed to a focus on financial performance ahead of stakeholders and non-financial risks; more than 85 per cent of votes supported the remuneration report at the 2024 meeting, avoiding a second strike.

In May 2022, 31 per cent of JPMorgan Chase shareholders supported the bank's non-binding say-on-pay resolution, in a protest at a US$52.6 million special retention award to chief executive Jamie Dimon.

=== Board composition and proxy contests ===
At the annual meeting of The Walt Disney Company in Philadelphia on 3 March 2004, about 43 per cent of votes were withheld from the re-election of chairman and chief executive Michael Eisner, following a campaign by former director Roy E. Disney, who claimed Eisner was a micromanager who had caused a creative brain drain. The board separated the two roles the same day and appointed George J. Mitchell chairman; Eisner retired as chief executive in 2005.

In 2021 the activist investment firm Engine No. 1, which held about 0.02 per cent of ExxonMobil's shares, ran a slate of four candidates against the company's board on the ground that it had failed to plan for the energy transition. Two of its nominees were elected at the annual meeting on 26 May 2021, and a third was confirmed when further results were released on 2 June. The successful nominees, Gregory Goff, Kaisa Hietala and Alexander Karsner, were supported by BlackRock, Vanguard, State Street and CalPERS.

At an extraordinary general meeting in March 2021, shareholders of the Japanese conglomerate Toshiba approved a proposal by its largest shareholder, Effissimo Capital Management, to appoint independent investigators to examine the conduct of the previous year's annual meeting. Their report concluded that Toshiba had worked with Japan's Ministry of Economy, Trade and Industry to limit the influence of foreign shareholders. On 25 June 2021, shareholders voted against a further term for board chairman Osamu Nagayama.

The Australian electricity generator AGL Energy abandoned a proposed demerger of its coal-fired generation business on 30 May 2022, after concluding that it would not obtain the 75 per cent shareholder approval required. The plan had been opposed by Grok Ventures, the investment vehicle of Mike Cannon-Brookes, which held 11.28 per cent of the company; the chairman, chief executive and two other directors announced their departures. At the annual general meeting on 15 November 2022, shareholders elected all four of Grok's nominees to the board, although the board had endorsed only one of them.

=== Environmental and social concerns ===
In 2008, members of the Rockefeller family, descendants of Standard Oil founder John D. Rockefeller, backed shareholder resolutions at ExxonMobil calling for the roles of chairman and chief executive to be separated and for greater attention to climate change. The separation resolution received about 39.5 per cent of votes and, like the sixteen other shareholder proposals put that year, was defeated.

In 2010, BP and Shell faced a shareholder revolt over their Canadian tar sands policy.

After the mining company Rio Tinto destroyed Aboriginal rock shelters at Juukan Gorge in Western Australia in May 2020, institutional shareholders including the Australian Council of Superannuation Investors pressed the company for individual accountability. On 11 September 2020, Rio Tinto announced that chief executive Jean-Sébastien Jacques and two senior executives would leave.

At the annual general meeting of the Australian oil and gas producer Woodside Energy on 24 April 2024, 58.4 per cent of votes were cast against the company's climate transition plan, which had been endorsed by 51 per cent when last put to shareholders in 2022. The vote was not binding on the company.

=== Corporate strategy and transactions ===
At Deutsche Bank's annual general meeting in May 2015, 61 per cent of shareholders voted to ratify the conduct of the management board, against about 89 per cent the previous year, amid complaints about profitability and regulatory penalties. Co-chief executives Anshu Jain and Jürgen Fitschen resigned about two weeks later.

Toshifumi Suzuki resigned as chairman and chief executive of the Japanese retailer Seven & i Holdings in April 2016, after its board rejected his proposal to replace the head of the group's 7-Eleven business, a succession dispute contested by the activist investor Third Point.

Unilever withdrew a proposal to consolidate its Anglo-Dutch structure in Rotterdam on 5 October 2018, after at least ten shareholders holding about 12 per cent of the company opposed it. Objections included the removal of Unilever from the FTSE 100 index, which would have obliged index-tracking funds to sell their holdings.

The board of the French food company Danone removed Emmanuel Faber as chairman and chief executive on 15 March 2021, following campaigns by the activist investors Bluebell Capital Partners, Artisan Partners and Causeway Capital Management, which criticised shareholder returns under his leadership relative to those of competitors.

== See also ==
- Shareholder activism
- Shareholder oppression
- Say on pay
- Proxy fight
