= Spirax Group =

Pump and hydraulics company

Spirax Group plc
- Type: Public
- Traded as: LSE: SPX; FTSE 100 component
- Industry: Manufacturing
- Founded: 1888
- Headquarters: Cheltenham, England, UK
- Key people: Tim Cobbold (chair); Nimesh Patel (CEO)
- Revenue: ▲£1,702.9 million (2025)
- Operating income: ▼£265.4 million (2025)
- Net income: ▼£163.6 million (2025)
- Number of employees: 10,000 (2026)
- Website: www.spiraxgroup.com

Spirax Group plc, formerly Spirax-Sarco Engineering plc, is a British manufacturer of steam management systems and peristaltic pumps and associated fluid path technologies. It is headquartered in Cheltenham, England. It is listed on the London Stock Exchange and is a constituent of the FTSE 100 Index.

== History ==
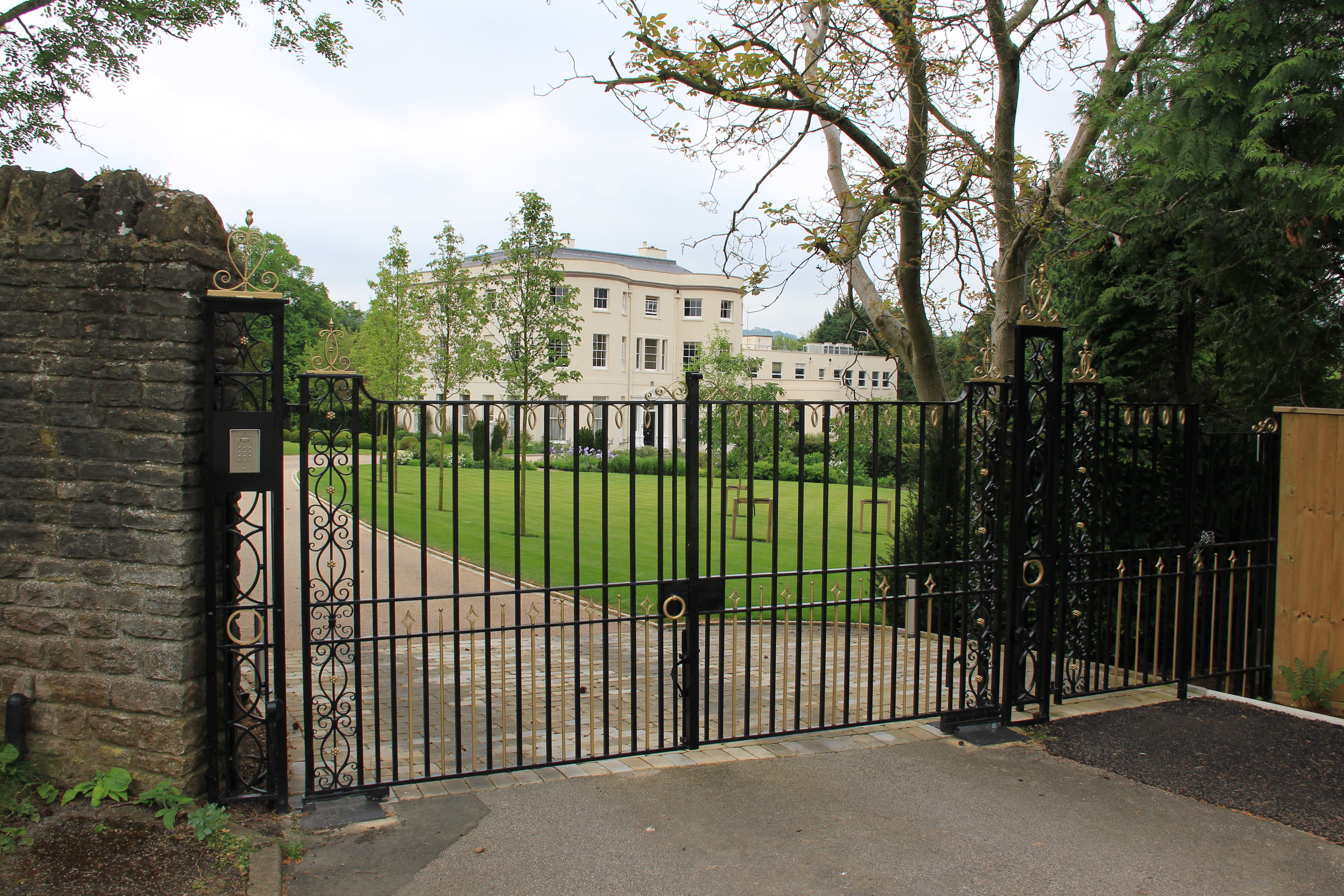
Charlton House, the company's head office in Cheltenham

The company was founded by Herman Sanders in 1888 and after a Mr Rehders joined the business, established as Sanders, Rehders & Co. ('Sarco') in London. Initially, it focused upon the importing of thermostatic steam traps from Germany. During 1932, Sarco commenced the domestic manufacture of steam traps under the Spirax brand name. Between 1952 and 1968, the business was headed by Lionel Northcroft.

In 1959, it was listed on the London Stock Exchange as Spirax-Sarco Engineering. During 1960, Spirax-Sarco launched its first range of self-acting pressure controls. Three years later, it acquired Drayton Controls, a rival control valve and instrumentation business.

During 1990, the company diversified into pump manufacturing via the purchase of Watson-Marlow. Three years later, Spirax-Sarco also acquired the Jucker Industrial Division, an Italian controls business; another firm, Bredel Hose Pumps, a manufacturer of high-pressure hose pumps, followed in 1996. During 2001, M&M International, an Italian piston actuated and solenoid valve business was also purchased. In September 2005, it acquired Mitech Actuators & Controls and Proportional Control Technology, a pair of South African businesses making process controls. Later that same year, it also bought EMCO Flow Systems, a metering business.

The company was negatively impacted by the onset of the Great Recession during the late 2000s, but was observing signs of recovery within two years. In early 2009, Spirax Sarco acquired the Turkish distributor Intervalf in exchange for £2.8 million. During the following year, it completed a new facility in Shanghai, China: the plant, which functions as Spirax's regional headquarters, combines a factory, warehouse, and offices. That same year, the firm launched a £25 million initiative to modernise and consolidate its manufacturing and research and development operations around Cheltenham, Gloucestershire.

In 2011, the Minister for UK Trade & Investment, Lord Green, opened Spirax Sarco's new facility in Saint Petersburg, Russia. During May 2012, Deputy Prime Minister Nick Clegg visited Spirax Sarco’s manufacturing facility in Cheltenham. In May 2012, there was a shareholder revolt following Spirax-Sarco's payment of £783,660 to a former executive director; the company compounded the situation by failing to inform the markets of the shareholder revolt as required by the Listing Rules. During November 2012, the company bought Termodinámica, a distributor based in Santiago de Chile, for £3.3 million. In February 2019, following regulatory clearance from US, French and German officials, Spirax-Sarco acquired Thermocoax, a multinational manufacturer of mineral insulated cable.

By the late 2010s, Spirax-Sarco was deriving 77 per cent of its revenues and 70 per cent of its profits) from its work on industrial/commercial steam systems and electrical heating applications. Its revenues and profits are typically more consistent and steady than many other manufacturers due to 50 per cent of its sales being to relatively non-cyclical sectors such as food, pharmaceuticals, biotechnology and healthcare. Furthermore, over 70 per cent of its annual revenues came from direct sales to customers, a strategy long practiced by the company since the 1950s. A wider push towards Net Zero has also been a beneficial trend for the firm. While the majority of its products have been suited for niche applications, these niches have typically faced relatively little competition. These factors have led to Spirax Sarco operating with relatively high profit margins.

Throughout the COVID-19 pandemic of the early 2020s, the company experienced high demands for several of its products from pharmaceutical companies working on vaccines and medical equipment manufacturers producing breathing apparatus. In summer 2021, Spirax Sarco opened a new office in Cheltenham, which was named after its former chairman Lionel Northcroft.

During 2022, it acquired the thermal energy firm Durex International in exchange for $342 million; furthermore, it also took a 15 per cent ownership stake valued at £3 million in the Norwegian thermal battery company Kyoto Group. The company also ceased all business activities in Russia shortly after the start of the Russian invasion of Ukraine. In February 2024, the company announced its intention to rebrand as Spirax Group, subject to shareholder approval; accordingly, the firm changed its name from Spirax-Sarco Engineering to Spirax Group on 3 June 2024.

== Operations ==
Premises in Ringsted, Denmark

The company has three main operations: (i) Steam Thermal Solutions, (ii) Electric Thermal Solutions and (iii) Watson-Marlow Fluid Technology Solutions.
