= Clearblue =

Home medical product brand

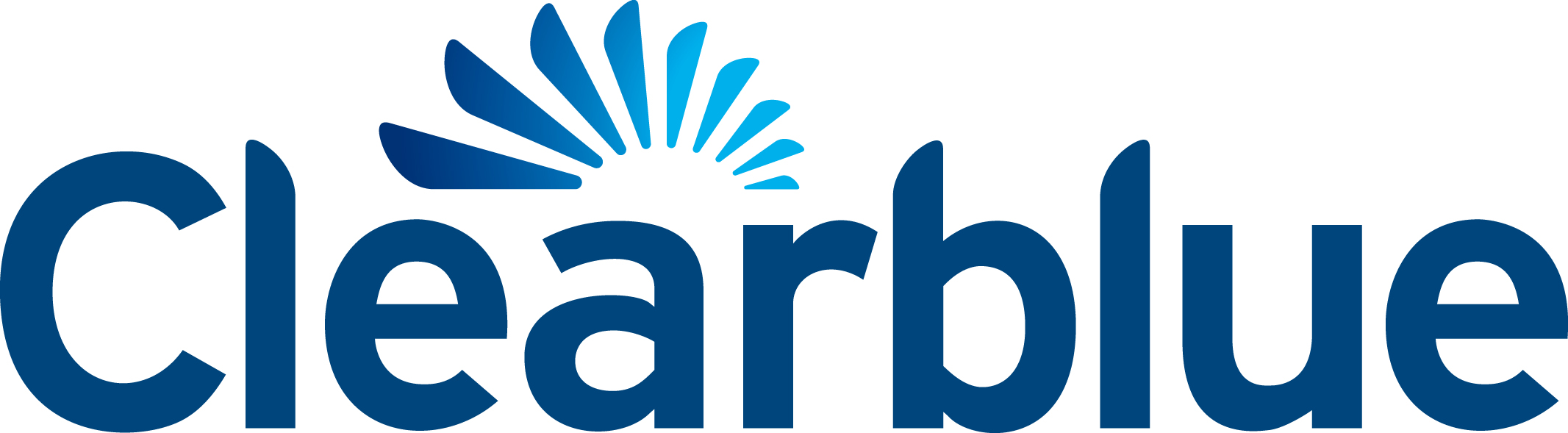
- Current owner: SPD Swiss Precision Diagnostics GmbH
- Introduced: 1985
- Markets: World
- Website: www.clearblue.com

Clearblue is a brand of Swiss Precision Diagnostics that offers consumer home diagnostic products such as pregnancy tests, ovulation tests and fertility monitors.

== Product history ==
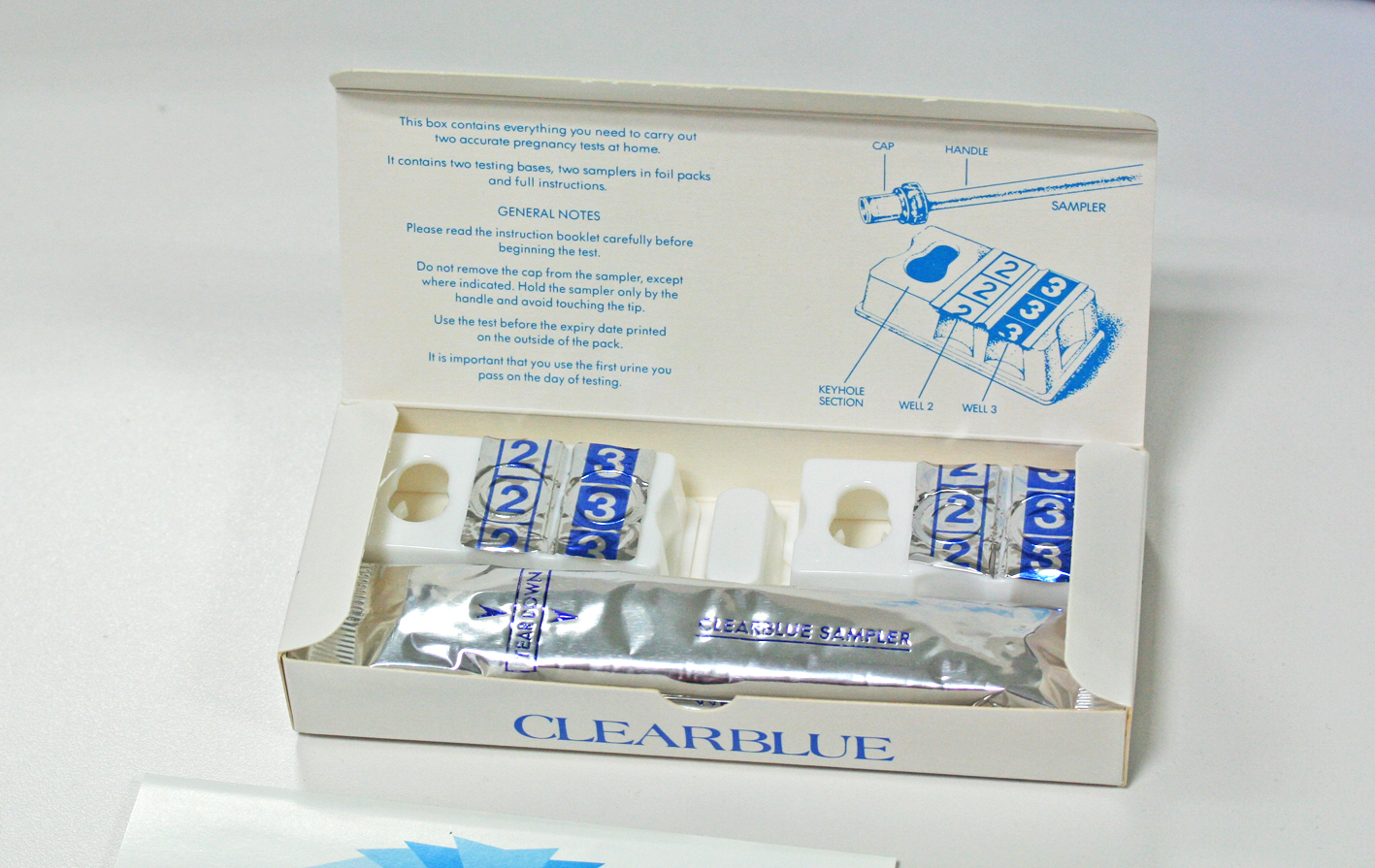
Clearblue home pregnancy test system 1985

Clearblue was introduced in 1985 with the launch of the first Clearblue Home Pregnancy Test system, which at the time was owned by Unilever. It was the world’s first “rapid home test” that gave pregnancy test results in 30 minutes and allowed a woman to take a test before going to the doctor. The test was a three-step process using a dipstick and small tray.

In 1988, Clearblue launched the first one-step pregnancy test with the invention of lateral flow technology. This one-step test gave a result in 3 minutes, subsequently reduced to a 1-minute result when Clearblue introduced the world’s first one-minute home pregnancy test in 1996. In 2003, Clearblue released the first digital pregnancy test to show the result in words ‘Pregnant’ or ‘Not Pregnant’ on a digital screen.

In 2008, Clearblue launched the Clearblue Digital Pregnancy Test with Conception Indicator, which sells in Europe.

Clearblue has also launched ovulation and fertility home diagnostic products to help women identify their fertile days and to maximize their chances of conception.

In 1989, Clearblue released the first one-step home ovulation test, enabling women to measure their surge in Luteinising Hormone (LH) to determine their most fertile days. In 1999, the brand launched the world’s first dual-hormone fertility monitor, which allowed women to measure estrone3-glucuronide (estrogen) in combination with LH.

The company created the first digital ovulation test in 2004.

In 2013, the company also began offering an ovulation test with a dual hormone read, detecting both estrogen and LH.

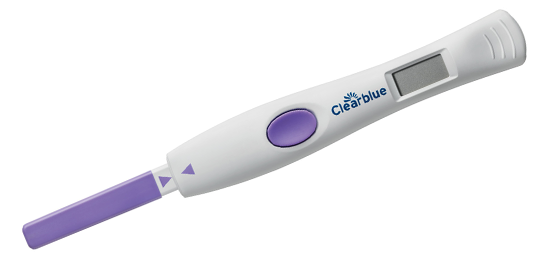
Clearblue Advanced Digital Ovulation Test

In 2017, Clearblue launched the Clearblue® Connected Ovulation Test System. The Clearblue Connected Ovulation Test System connects via Bluetooth® to a users phone – it was the first test system tracking 2 hormones and connecting to the user's phone. Results are synced and displayed on the phone together with a monthly calendar, cycle comparison charts. Users can also set smart reminders.

== Awards and Partnerships ==
Clearblue won the 2012 Red Dot Design Award in the product design category for its Clearblue Plus Pregnancy Test. Its ergonomic design aimed to make the test easy to use. The Clearblue Digital Ovulation test was the 2011 Platinum winner in the Prima Baby Reader Awards.

In 2019 Clearblue’s Connected Ovulation Test System won the European New Product of the Year Award by Nicholas Hall, sponsored by OTC New Products Tracker and Most Innovative New OTC Product in the UK OTC Marketing Awards 2019https://pharmaintelligence.informa.com/events/awards/otc-marketing-awards-2019/winners-2019

Clearblue partnered with Tommy’s Charity in the UK in 2018-2019 to promote the importance of preparing for pregnancy.

In 2019, Clearblue, in partnership with the Be My Eyes app, launched the first service of its kind for their blind and low vision users of Clearblue.

Clearblue was a donor to Flight for Every Mother Ltd, a humanitarian project led by Dr. Sophia Webster which aimed to improve maternal health in Africa.

== Corporate history ==
SPD was formed in 2007 as a joint venture, between Procter & Gamble (P&G) and Alere (now a part of the Abbott group, since October 2017) to create, using its parent companies’ complementary strengths, one of the world's foremost organisations in consumer diagnostics.

P&G is a major consumer goods company, with numerous household brands. Alere (a wholly owned subsidiary of Abbott) is among the world's providers of diagnostic products, in the professional management of women’s health and chronic and infectious disease

SPD is headquartered in Geneva, Switzerland. In addition to Clearblue, the company also manufactures and distributes other consumer diagnostic products.

== Clearblue Innovation Center ==
The Clearblue research and development facility - the Clearblue Innovation Center - is based in Bedford, United Kingdom, and employs over 150 people. The Research Center has conducted over 180 clinical studies involving over 300,000 clinical trial participants.

== See also ==
- Human chorionic gonadotrophin
- Early pregnancy factor
- Birth control
