= Thomas James Smith =

UK medical businessman

Thomas James Smith (1827−1896) was the founder of Smith & Nephew, one of the United Kingdom's largest medical devices businesses.

== Career ==
After training as a pharmacist at a dispensing chemist in Grantham and then at University College, London, Thomas Smith opened his own chemist's shop in Hull in 1856. In 1858 he started selling cod-liver oil most of which came from Newfoundland although he obtained one large batch at a cheaper price from Norway: he sold these supplies to hospitals on a wholesale basis.

In 1896 he was joined by his nephew, Horatio Nelson Smith, who helped build T.J. Smith & Nephew into a global medical supplies business. Thomas Smith died later in 1896.

== Other interests ==
He became President of the Hull Chamber of Commerce.
