= Stephen Dacus =

Japanese-American business executive

- Born: November 7, 1960 (age 65); United States
- Known for: CEO of Seven & I Holdings
- Spouse: Jennifer
- Children: 3

Stephen Hayes Dacus (born November 7, 1960) is an American business executive and the president and CEO of Seven and I Holdings. He is the Japanese company's first foreign-born CEO.

== Early and personal life ==
Dacus was raised in the United States and Japan by an American father and Japanese mother. His father was a 7-Eleven franchisee, where Dacus used to work night shifts.

== Career ==
After graduating from university, Dacus studied to be a certified public accountant as a night student at the University of California, Los Angeles due to demand for Japanese-speaking accountants because of Japanese companies relocating to Los Angeles. Dacus worked for PwC for nine years before he joined the Asian subsidiary of Mars. He was CEO of MasterFoods from 2001 until 2005, when he joined Fast Retailing, the parent company of Uniqlo, working under Yanai Tadashi. He focused on expanding Uniqlo overseas. In 2007, Dacus joined Walmart as a senior vice president before he became CEO of Walmart Japan in 2011. Walmart eventually sold off its entire stake in the Japanese supermarket Seiyu.

After returning to the United States for his retirement, Dacus was asked to become chairman of the Japanese sushi chain Sushiro.

=== Seven and I ===
Dacus joined Seven and I Holdings in 2022 as an outside director before he became chairman of the company's board in May 2024. After Canadian convenience store company Alimentation Couche-Tard attempted to purchase Seven and I, Dacus was put in charge of a special committee to consider the $47 billion bid. In March 2025, Dacus was announced as the company's next CEO following the resignation of Ryuichi Isaka. In July 2025, Couche-Tard had announced it would not proceed with its attempted acquisition of Seven and I.

Dacus has said he plans to take the North American division of Seven and I, 7-Eleven, for an initial public offering in 2026. As part of his plans to revitalize the company, Dacus has pledged to introduce fresh food into North American stores, similar to the company's Japanese stores.

== Personal life ==
Dacus is married and has three children. He is fluent in Japanese and English.
