= Swiss Precision Diagnostics =

Healthcare company

Swiss Precision Diagnostics GmbH is a Swiss medical diagnostic company, that produces Clearblue-branded pregnancy testing equipment.

== History ==
The company was formed as a 50/50 joint venture (JV) between Alere (concerning the division Unipath, which had been acquired from Unilever) and P&G. It was formed on 17 May 2007. Abbott Laboratories acquired Alere in 2017.

Hilde Eylenbosch was the first Chief Executive of the company.

== Structure ==
It is based in Geneva, in offices of P&G. It is a business member of the British-based Institute of Bio-Sensing Technology.

== Products ==
It makes medical diagnostic kits (biosensors).

- Accu-Clear
- Clearblue
- Persona

== See also ==
- Category:Tests for pregnancy
