= Unipath =

Former women's healthcare company

Unipath Ltd was a pharmaceutical company, subsidiary to Unilever and then Alere, specialising mainly in medical diagnostic kits related to women's reproductive health. It subsequently diversified its product range to include more specialised test kits, primarily for the clinical market, in other areas.

Based in Bedford, United Kingdom, the company had between 500 and 600 employees globally. Unipath's main assets were folded into Swiss Precision Diagnostics.

== History ==
Unipath was formed in 1984 by the Unilever group. In 1985 they released and started to manufacture the first in their line of home pregnancy test kits marketed under the Clearblue brand. The name is related to the fact that the test produced a blue marker line as a positive (pregnant) result and that it is 'clear' and simple to use. The product was a success, in part due to intensive advertising and held a majority market share in the UK by the end of the year.

Unipath released their clearplan home ovulation kit in 1987. The kit was designed for use in identifying the period of peak fertility in a prospective mother's menstrual cycle so that the optimal time for insemination leading to conception could be determined. In 1996 Unipath released a complementary product, the Persona fertility monitor, designed to identify fertile and infertile periods in the menstrual cycle. Identification of fertile and infertile days is known as fertility awareness, and may be used as birth control or to help achieve pregnancy.

Unipath continued to make improvements to its fertility-related products over the years, improving their convenience and reliability of use. Refinements included a urine collector strip on their Clearblue pregnancy test that turns pink to indicate proper urine absorption, thus reducing the chance of a false-negative test by improper use. A later refinement also replacing the simple blue line indicator with an LCD that clearly indicates the result, reducing the chance of the test line being misinterpreted by people unaccustomed to using medical test kits.

In 2001 Unilever sold the company to the Alere (then Inverness Medical Innovations Group). The company has since diversified its products considerably, offering a greater range of test kits for strictly clinical usage. These include tests for Respiratory syncytial virus, Hepatitis B and chlamydia infections, as well as blood chemistry test kits designed to aid diagnosis of myocardial infarction and deep vein thrombosis. Most of these tests employ adaptions of unipath's in-house developed technology and patents thereof. In part, the diversification of the company's range of products in recent years is in anticipation of its original patents expiring, opening it to competition from companies that may use the same technology. In 1994, Unipath released its own range of vitamin supplements for both pregnant and breastfeeding women, released under the Clearblue brand in synergy with its successful pregnancy test kit.

In 2007, Clearblue and other brands were folded into Swiss Precision Diagnostics (SPD) as a 50/50 joint venture between Alere and Procter & Gamble. The Unipath subsidiary was subsequently phased out by Alere. The Bedford main office of the former Unipath operates as a part of SPD under the name Clearblue Innovation Centre.

== See also ==
- Pharmaceutical industry in the United Kingdom
