= Seven-Eleven Japan =

Japanese convenience store chain

Seven-Eleven Japan Co., Ltd.

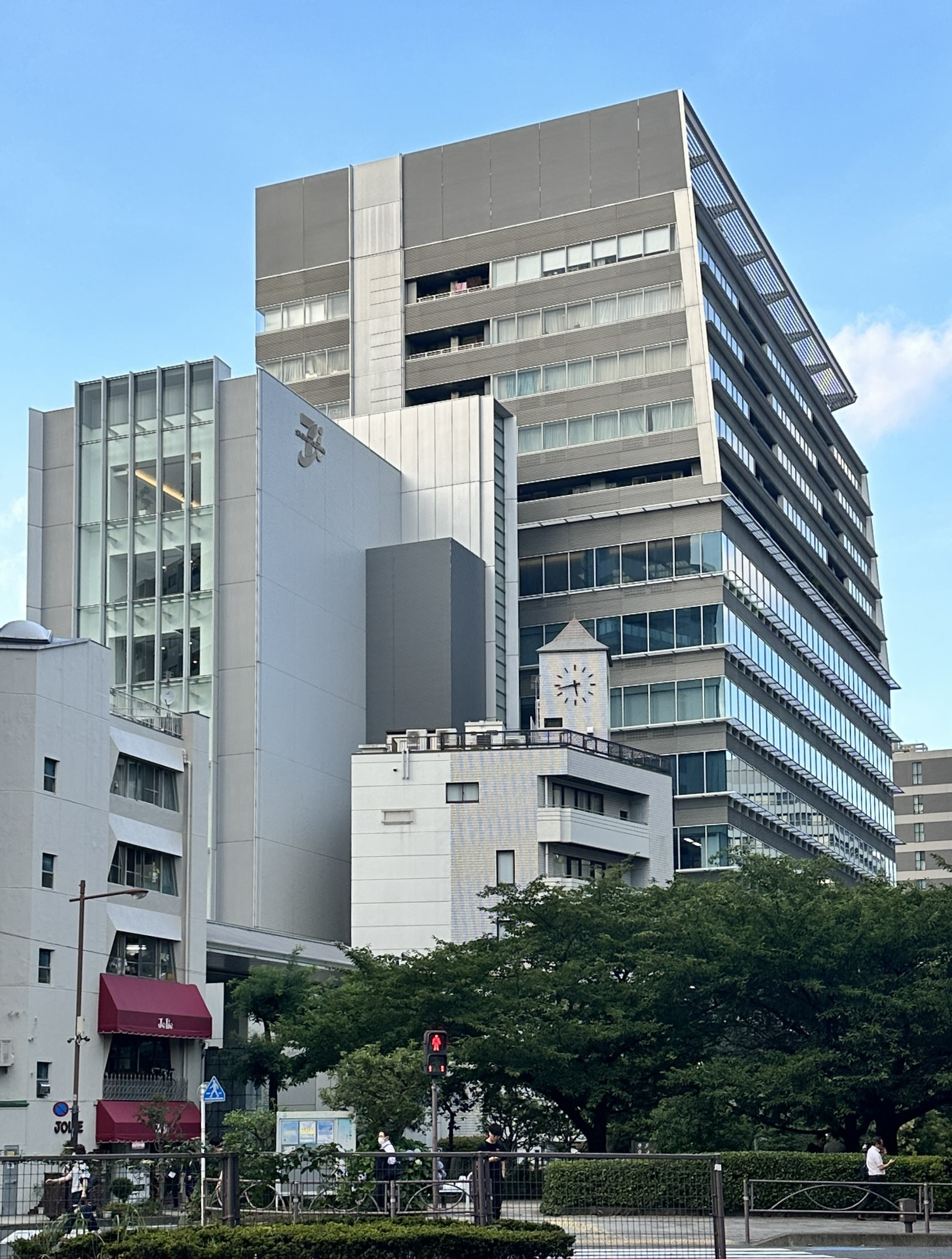
- Seven-Eleven Japan's headquarters in Chiyoda, Tokyo
- Trade name: 7-Eleven
- Native name: 株式会社セブン-イレブン・ジャパン
- Romanized name: Kabushiki gaisha Sebun Irebun Japan
- Formerly: York Seven (1959–1978)
- Type: Subsidiary
- Industry: Retail
- Founded: December 28, 1959; 66 years ago
- Founder: Ito-Yokado
- Headquarters: Nibanchō, Chiyoda, Tokyo, Japan
- Area served: Worldwide
- Key people: Fumihiko Nagamatsu (chairman, president & Representative Director)
- Owner: Seven and I Holdings
- Number of employees: 8,549 (2023)
- Subsidiaries: Seven Net Shopping Co., Ltd.; Seven-Eleven Okinawa Co., Ltd.; 7dream.com Co., LTD (68.0%); Seven-Meal Service Co., Ltd. (90.0%); 7-Eleven, Inc.; Seven-Eleven (Hawaii), Inc.; Seven-Eleven (China) Investment Co., Ltd.; Seven Eleven (Beijing) Co., Ltd. (65.0%); Seven Eleven (Chengdu) Co., Ltd.; Seven Eleven (Tianjin) Co., Ltd.; Seven Bank (38.04%)

Seven-Eleven Japan Co., Ltd. (株式会社セブン‐イレブン・ジャパン; Kabushiki gaisha Sebun Irebun Japan, often abbreviated as SEJ) is a Japanese convenience store chain headquartered in Chiyoda, Tokyo. It is a subsidiary of Seven & I Holdings and the parent of 7-Eleven, Inc., which owns the global 7-Eleven franchise.

The company was established in 1973 as York Seven (ヨークセブン, Yōku Sebun) by the supermarket chain Ito-Yokado in collaboration with Southland Corporation, now known as 7-Eleven, Inc, an American convenience store chain. As of 2022, Seven-Eleven is the largest convenience store chain in Japan in terms of sales and number of stores. Additionally, it is one of the largest retail chains in Japan in terms of sales. In November 2005, it acquired full ownership of the original 7-Eleven, Inc.

== History ==
On August 28, 1973, Ito-Yokado announced a licensing agreement with Southland Corporation, an American convenience store chain known as 7-Eleven, to develop convenience stores in Japan. The agreement granted Ito-Yokado the franchise rights to establish a network of convenience stores. They aimed to expand the convenience store chain within approximately two years and set a goal of reaching 2,000 to 3,000 stores with a minimum target of 1,500 stores. In November 1973, the convenience store company York Seven was established.

In May 1974, the first-ever store in Japan opened in Toyosu, Kōtō, Tokyo. This marked the debut of the first full-fledged franchise convenience store in Japan. In June of the following year, the first 24-hour operation was introduced at a store in Kōriyama, Fukushima Prefecture.

In January 1978, York Seven changed its corporate name to Seven-Eleven Japan.

In 1987, SEJ partnered with Tokyo Electric Power Company to enable electricity bill payments at 1,600 stores in Tokyo and later in eight neighboring prefectures. In 1988, it became possible to make payments for Tokyo Gas at Seven-Eleven stores, and in 1989, payments for Dai-ichi Life Insurance and NHK were also made available.

In October 1979, SEJ went public on the Tokyo Stock Exchange Second Section, and in August 1981, it was designated for listing on the TSE First Section.

As of January 1988, the number of Seven-Eleven stores was 3,251, with 2,200 of those stores located in the greater Tokyo area, which include nine prefectures.

On November 14, 1989, SEJ announced that it had reached a basic agreement to acquire all 57 Seven-Eleven stores in Hawaii from the Southland Corporation for 75 million dollars (approximately 16 billion yen). Southland Corporation had become a target of a takeover by an investor group around 1986, and to counter this, the Thompson family spent approximately 5 billion dollars (710 billion yen) to repurchase all of their own shares starting from 1987. However, the burden of debt became significant, leading to the "piecemeal sale" of the Hawaii stores. As a result, SEJ was scheduled to acquire all the assets, including land, buildings, and business rights, of the 57 stores in Hawaii.

On March 22, the following year, SEJ announced once again that it had reached a basic agreement to acquire the Southland Corporation. With the cooperation of creditors, it was agreed that the Yokado Group would acquire 75% of Southland Corporation's shares for a total of 400 million dollars (approximately 60 billion yen). As a prerequisite for the acquisition, SEJ intended to recover Southland Corporation's junk bonds (totaling 1.8 billion dollars) from bondholders and exchange them for new low-interest corporate bonds and common stock. However, some bondholders resisted parting with high-yield junk bonds, making the recovery difficult. After several negotiation deadline extensions, SEJ revealed on October 24 that it had applied to the U.S. bankruptcy court for the implementation of Southland Corporation's restructuring plan. The court approved the restructuring plan, and on March 6, 1991, SEJ announced the completion of the acquisition process, purchasing 70% of the company's stock for 430 million dollars (approximately 56 billion yen).

On August 24, 1995, SEJ announced its full-scale expansion into the Kansai region, with Osaka as the central location. While SEJ had the largest number of stores nationwide in the convenience store industry, they employed a strategy of concentrating store openings in specific regions to streamline operations. Prior to this announcement, SEJ had only opened stores in Kyoto, Shiga, and certain parts of Osaka Prefecture in the Kansai region.

According to the interim financial results in August 1996, the total sales of all stores in the SEJ chain surpassed its parent company, Ito-Yokado, for the first time. While SEJ had recorded the top position in the retail industry for three consecutive years in terms of operating profit, Ito-Yokado's sales amounted to 773.53 billion yen, while SEJ's headquarters sales reached 128.52 billion yen, and the total sales of all stores amounted to 844.54 billion yen.

In May 1999, SEJ announced its plans to form partnerships with four city banks: The Sakura Bank, Tokyo Mitsubishi Bank, Sanwa Bank, and Asahi Bank. The goal was to install automated teller machines in all of its 7,780 stores across the country by the following summer. Other convenience store chains had already begun similar partnerships. Lawson had partnered with Sanwa and Fuji Bank since the previous year, and Ampm Japan had partnered with The Sakura Bank starting from March of that year, already operating cash dispenser and ATM services. Circle K Japan was also considering installations in collaboration with Tokai Bank.

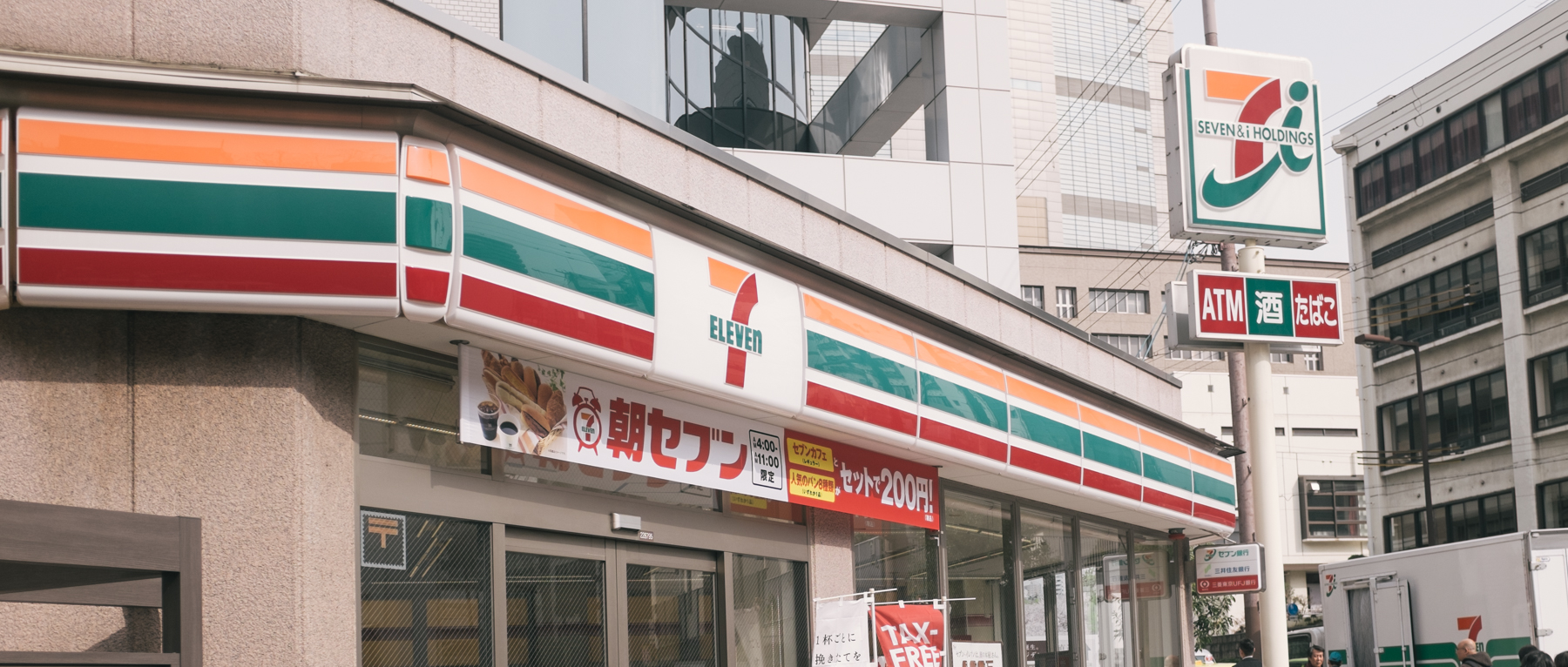
7-Eleven stores displaying the Seven & I Holdings logo

On April 20, 2005, Ito-Yokado and its subsidiary Seven-Eleven Japan and Denny's Japan announced their plans to establish a holding company called Seven & I Holdings effective from September 1. Under this new management structure, various business companies would come under the umbrella of the holding company. While Ito-Yokado's performance was struggling, SEJ continued to perform well. In the financial results for the fiscal year ending in February 2005, over 90% of Ito-Yokado's consolidated operating profit of 211.9 billion yen was generated by the convenience store business. The market capitalization of the stocks also reflected this trend, with SEJ reversing the situation and reaching approximately 2.39 trillion yen, surpassing Ito-Yokado's 1.637 trillion yen. The establishment of the holding company was aimed at preventing hostile takeovers by consolidating and protecting the companies within the group.

On September 1, 2005, SEJ announced its intention to launch a tender offer in the U.S. market to acquire the remaining 27.7% of the issued shares of Seven-Eleven, Inc., which it did not already own, thereby making it a wholly owned subsidiary. The estimated total value of the tender offer was approximately 1 billion dollars (approximately 111 billion yen). On November 9, it was announced that the TOB by SEJ had concluded, and they had acquired 95.4% of the issued shares of SEI. The remaining shares were acquired through compulsory acquisition based on the laws of the state of Texas, thereby establishing it as a wholly owned subsidiary.

On July 11, 2019, Seven-Eleven made its first entry into Okinawa Prefecture. They opened 14 stores in cities such as Naha, achieving their goal of having stores in all 47 prefectures in Japan.
