= Ron Zwanziger =

American businessman

Ron Zwanziger (born 1954) is an Israeli-American businessman. He is best known for founding and leading the diagnostic test manufacturer Alere.

== Early life and education ==
Zwanziger was born in Israel in 1954 and raised on the island of Cyprus after 1956.

He earned an engineering degree from Imperial College London in 1975 and an MBA from Harvard Business School in 1981.

== Career ==
=== Medisense (1981-1991) ===
Along with three business school classmates, Zwanziger co-founded Medisense Inc., a maker of glucose meters used in diabetes home care, in 1981. He was CEO until 1991.

Originally, the company worked on 13 disparate biotechnology ideas, hoping one or another would pay off. By 1984, the company had narrowed its focus to one of the projects, which concerned electrochemical biosensors. (Note: 2 of the other projects (which concerned Dutch elm disease and metabolic engineering) had been sold or spun off, and the rest scrapped.)

In 1987, Medisense introduced the ExacTech, which was the first electrochemical biosensor-based glucose meter for home use. This technology required less blood to obtain a reading, and by 2008 was used in a majority of the 6 billion home blood glucose tests being performed annually. In his textbook on electrochemistry, Alan Bond of Monash University suggests that the commercial success of electrochemical home glucose monitoring "predominantly can be attributed to the introduction of the ExacTech system."

Medisense was acquired by Abbott Laboratories in 1996 for $876 million.

=== Alere (1991-2014) ===
Zwanziger founded Alere Inc. (then called Selfcare Inc.), a diagnostic test manufacturer, in 1991. He was CEO until 2014.

Alere's diabetes unit was sold to Johnson and Johnson (LifeScan) in 2001 for $1.3 billion. With the 2001 acquisition of the subsidiary Unipath from Unilever, Alere became the leading manufacturer of ovulation and pregnancy tests. Alere acquired Biosite Inc. in a $1.7 billion hostile takeover in 2007. By 2012, Alere was the largest manufacturer in the HIV testing space, according to the nonprofit Population Services International.

Abbott Laboratories acquired Alere in 2017 for $5.3 billion. Alere's Binax-branded test line provided the basis for Abbott's widely used BinaxNow COVID-19 rapid antigen test.

=== LumiraDx (2014-2023) ===
Along with longtime partners Drs. David Scott and Jerry McAleer, Zwanziger co-founded the diagnostic test manufacturer LumiraDx in 2014. He was CEO until November 2023, when all three founders resigned amid "financial difficulties" at the company. On December 29, 2023, LumiraDx reached a $350 million agreement to sell its key assets to Roche Diagnostics.

LumiraDx produces several rapid diagnostic tests which are read by a single brick-sized device at the point of care. A 2021 presentation by Bill Gates hailed the LumiraDx platform as "amazing" and "cheaper and smaller than the diagnostic devices that came before." A 2021 meta-analysis of 133 studies showed that LumiraDx's COVID-19 rapid antigen test had the highest sensitivity among 61 products.
