= Namal Nawana =

Australian businessman

- Born: 1970 or 1971 (age 55–56); Sri Lanka
- Education: University of Adelaide; Henley Business School
- Occupation: Businessman
- Title: Worldwide President, DePuy Synthes
- Term: 2025 – present

Namal Nawana (born 1970/1971) is an Australian businessman. He is the worldwide president of DePuy Synthes, an American multinational manufacturer of medical devices.

== Early life and education ==
Nawana was born in Sri Lanka and raised in Australia. Nawana received a bachelor’s degree in mechanical engineering in 1992 and a Master of Medical Science from the University of Adelaide in South Australia in 1995. Nawana received a Master of Business Administration from the Henley Business School, United Kingdom, in 2000.

== Career ==
In 1992, Nawana’s career began as a research engineer at Royal Adelaide Hospital before he became a product development engineer at Howmedica International.

In 1997, Nawana began a 15-year tenure at Johnson & Johnson. Nawana held various roles in engineering, marketing, and sales. His first role at Johnson & Johnson Orthopaedics was Technical Support Manager. Nawana was then promoted to Sales Director of DePuy Orthopaedics and Trauma before becoming the General Manager of DePuy Canada in 2004. He later was appointed to lead DePuy business in Australia and, in 2009, was promoted to Area Vice President of Medical Devices and Diagnostics for Australia and New Zealand. In 2011, Nawana was appointed Worldwide President of DePuy Spine. During his tenure as Worldwide President, he oversaw the acquisition and integration of Synthes, creating DePuy Synthes. Nawana earned a Johnson & Johnson Six Sigma PE Black Belt.

In 2012, Nawana was appointed chief operating officer of the medical diagnostics company Alere. In 2014, Nawana was promoted to chief executive officer of the company. During his tenure, he oversaw its sale to Abbott Laboratories in 2017. In 2018, Nawana succeed Olivier Bohuon as CEO of Smith & Nephew. In October 2019, Smith & Nephew announced Nawana would stand down, reportedly "because his requests for higher pay, in line with the packages awarded by US medical device-makers, could not be met under UK corporate governance standards".

In 2021, Nawana founded, in partnership with KKR, Sapphiros, a medical device diagnostics platform. In 2022, Nawana stepped down as CEO of Sapphiros, retaining his role as executive chairman. In 2025, Nawana was appointed Worldwide President of Johnson & Johnson’s DePuy Synthes to lead the company spinoff.
