= Alere =

Subsidiary of Abbott

Alere Inc.
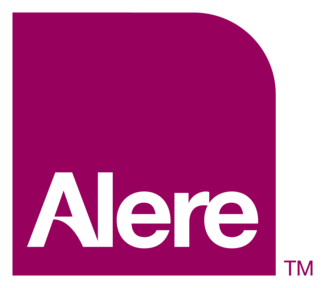
- Formerly: Inverness Medical Innovations, Inc.
- Type: Public
- Traded as: NYSE: ALR
- Industry: health care diagnostics
- Founded: 1991; 35 years ago
- Defunct: October 3, 2017
- Fate: Acquired by Abbott Laboratories
- Headquarters: Waltham, Massachusetts, United States
- Area served: Worldwide
- Revenue: US$2.39 billion (As of 2017)
- Number of employees: 9,700 (2016)
- Website: www.alere.com

Alere Inc. was a global manufacturer of rapid point-of-care diagnostic tests. The company was founded in 1991 and was headquartered in Waltham, Massachusetts. As of January 2017, the company had a market capitalization of $3.47 billion with an enterprise value of $5.9 billion. The company was formerly known as Inverness Medical Innovations, Inc. and changed its name to Alere Inc. in 2010.

== History ==
The company was founded in 1991 by Ron Zwanziger under the name SelfCare, which went public in 1996. The company changed its name from SelfCare to Inverness Medical Technology (IMT) in 2000. One year later, it sold its diabetes business to Johnson & Johnson, and split off a new company called Inverness Medical Innovations. That company subsequently expanded its business by acquiring many companies, including Unipath, Clondiag, Ionian Technologies, TwistDx, Wampole Laboratories, Ostex International, Binax, Biosite, HemoSense, Cholestech, Redwood Toxicology, Concateno, BBI Holdings, eScreen, Standard Diagnostics, and hhh Axis-Shield.

In 2007, Alere entered into a joint venture, named Swiss Precision Diagnostics, with Procter & Gamble for the sales and marketing of its consumer diagnostics products.

In 2009, Alere won two awards in the 16th Annual National Health Information program, which recognizes the U.S.’s best consumer health information programs and materials.

In 2010, the company changed its name to Alere and began trading under the ticker ALR in NYSE.

In 2013, the company completed the acquisition of Epocal, Inc.

In July 2014 Ron Zwanziger resigned as CEO and COO Namal Nawana took over as interim CEO.

In September 2014, Zwanziger offered to take the company private for $3.82 billion.

In October 2014, the board of directors voted and instated Namal Nawana as the permanent CEO of Alere, Inc.

In 2015, Alere divested its Alere Health management activities to Optum.

In February 2016, Abbott Laboratories announced it would acquire Alere Inc for $5.8 billion. However, in April, Abbott requested of Alere that this deal be terminated, a proposal rejected by Alere's board of directors.

On October 3, 2017, Abbott closed the Alere acquisition at the reduced price of $5.3 billion, making the surviving entity the market leader player in the $7 billion point-of-care diagnostic space within the broader $50 billion in-vitro diagnostics market with this takeover. With the acquisition of Alere, the company also obtain the subsidiary Arriva Medical, which is the largest mail-order diabetic supplier.

== Business ==
Alere operated three business units focused on cardiometabolic, infectious disease, and toxicology testing. The company was a pioneer in manufacturing rapid point-of-care diagnostic tests and provided products to healthcare professionals and patients worldwide.

In 2004, the company launched the world's first digital pregnancy test under Clearblue® Digital Pregnancy Test.

In 2010, Alere launched the Alere CD4 analyser, the world's first to provide absolute CD4 results at the Point of Care, making the management of HIV patients easier and more effective.

October 2012, the company received a warning from the Food and Drug Administration (FDA) for its inadequate response to FDA's earlier observations on its manufacturing process of the Triage products.

In 2014 Alere received clearance from US FDA for the Alere i Influenza A&B, a rapid molecular point-of-care test to detect and differentiate Influenza A&B virus in less than 15 minutes. In Jan 2015, Alere received US CLIA waiver for the Alere i Influenza test. In April 2015, Alere received FDA clearance for its second test on the Alere i platform, the Alere i Strep A test for Group A Streptococcus, which provides results in 8 minutes or less.

In March 2015 Alere received IVD CE mark for Alere q HIV analyser, a fully automated nucleic acid testing platform which brings the power of molecular testing to bench tops in any healthcare setting.

In August 2016 Alere received FDA Clearance for Alere i RSV Rapid Molecular Test which detects RSV infections in 13 minutes or less.

In 2016 the U.S. Justice Department launched an investigation into Alere's role in potential Medicaid and Medicare fraud.
