= ArthroCare =

American medical device company

ArthroCare Corporation
- Company type: Public (1996–2014)
- Industry: Medical devices
- Founded: 1993
- Founders: Hira V. Thapliyal; Philip E. Eggers
- Fate: Acquired by Smith & Nephew
- Successor: Smith & Nephew

ArthroCare Corporation was an American medical device company best known for developing and marketing radiofrequency-based Coblation systems used in soft-tissue surgery across sports medicine and otolaryngology. The company was headquartered in Austin, Texas, and in May 2014 it was acquired by Smith & Nephew for approximately $1.5 billion enterprise value.

== History ==
ArthroCare was founded in 1993 by engineers Hira V. Thapliyal and Philip E. Eggers and initially based in California, focusing on applying controlled radiofrequency energy to surgical tissue removal. The company completed its initial public offering in February 1996, selling 2.2 million shares at $14 each on NASDAQ under the ticker ARTC.

By the mid 2000s ArthroCare organized around three main business units - Sports Medicine, Spine, and ENT - marketing disposable devices built on its patented Coblation platform.

In July 2008 the company announced it would restate prior financial statements for 2006-2007 and Q1 2008 related to revenue recognition on distributor sales; shares fell sharply on the news. The company completed its restatement with its 2008 Form 10-K filing in November 2009.

=== Acquisition by Smith & Nephew ===
On 3 February 2014 Smith & Nephew agreed to acquire ArthroCare for $48.25 per share in cash, implying $1.7 billion equity value and $1.5 billion enterprise value, citing complementary portfolios in sports medicine and ENT. The transaction closed on 29 May 2014 after antitrust clearances. Smith & Nephew had previously licensed ArthroCare's RF Coblation technology; the acquisition eliminated related royalty payments.

== Technology ==
Many ArthroCare products used the company's Coblation technology, in which radiofrequency energy in a conductive medium creates a localized plasma field that ablates soft tissue at relatively low temperatures compared with traditional electrocautery. Randomized and prospective studies have evaluated Coblation in ENT procedures versus electrocautery or cold techniques, with mixed but often favorable findings in pain and bleeding outcomes depending on study design and population.

== Legal issues ==
In February 2011 the U.S. Securities and Exchange Commission instituted a settled cease-and-desist proceeding against ArthroCare over financial reporting, books-and-records, and internal control violations related to earlier revenue recognition practices. In June 2011 the SEC charged former executives John Raffle and David Applegate in a civil complaint alleging a channel-stuffing scheme to inflate sales and earnings between 2006 and early 2008.

In April 2012 the SEC filed a Sarbanes-Oxley Section 304 "clawback" action seeking reimbursement of incentive compensation and stock profits from CEO Michael A. Baker and former CFO Michael T. Gluk covering periods when the company's statements were misstated. The complaint did not allege their personal misconduct.

In August 2012 the U.S. Department of Justice (DOJ) announced the arrests of Raffle and Applegate in connection with a securities-fraud scheme tied to the company's distributor sales. ArthroCare later entered into a deferred prosecution agreement with DOJ and paid a $30 million penalty to resolve corporate criminal charges.

Baker and Gluk were first convicted at trial in 2014 on appeal in 2016 the Fifth Circuit vacated the convictions on evidentiary grounds and ordered a new trial. Following retrial in 2017, Baker was reconvicted of conspiracy, wire fraud, securities fraud, and making false statements, and later received a 20-year sentence; the Fifth Circuit affirmed his conviction in 2019.

=== Shareholder litigation ===
ArthroCare agreed to settle consolidated shareholder class actions stemming from the restatement for $74 million; the settlement received final approval in June 2012 in the U.S. District Court for the Western District of Texas.

== See also ==
- Smith & Nephew
