= Seven Bank =

Japanese bank

Seven Bank, Ltd. 株式会社セブン銀行
- Type: Public
- Traded as: TYO: 8410
- Industry: Financial services
- Founded: Marunouchi, Chiyoda, Tokyo, Japan (April 10, 2001, IY Bank)
- Headquarters: Marunouchi, Chiyoda, Tokyo, Japan
- Parent: Seven-Eleven Japan (Seven & I Holdings Co.) (33.38%); Itochu (20.41%)
- Subsidiaries: Pito AxM Platform, Inc (Philippines), FCTI, Inc. (United States)
- Website: Official website

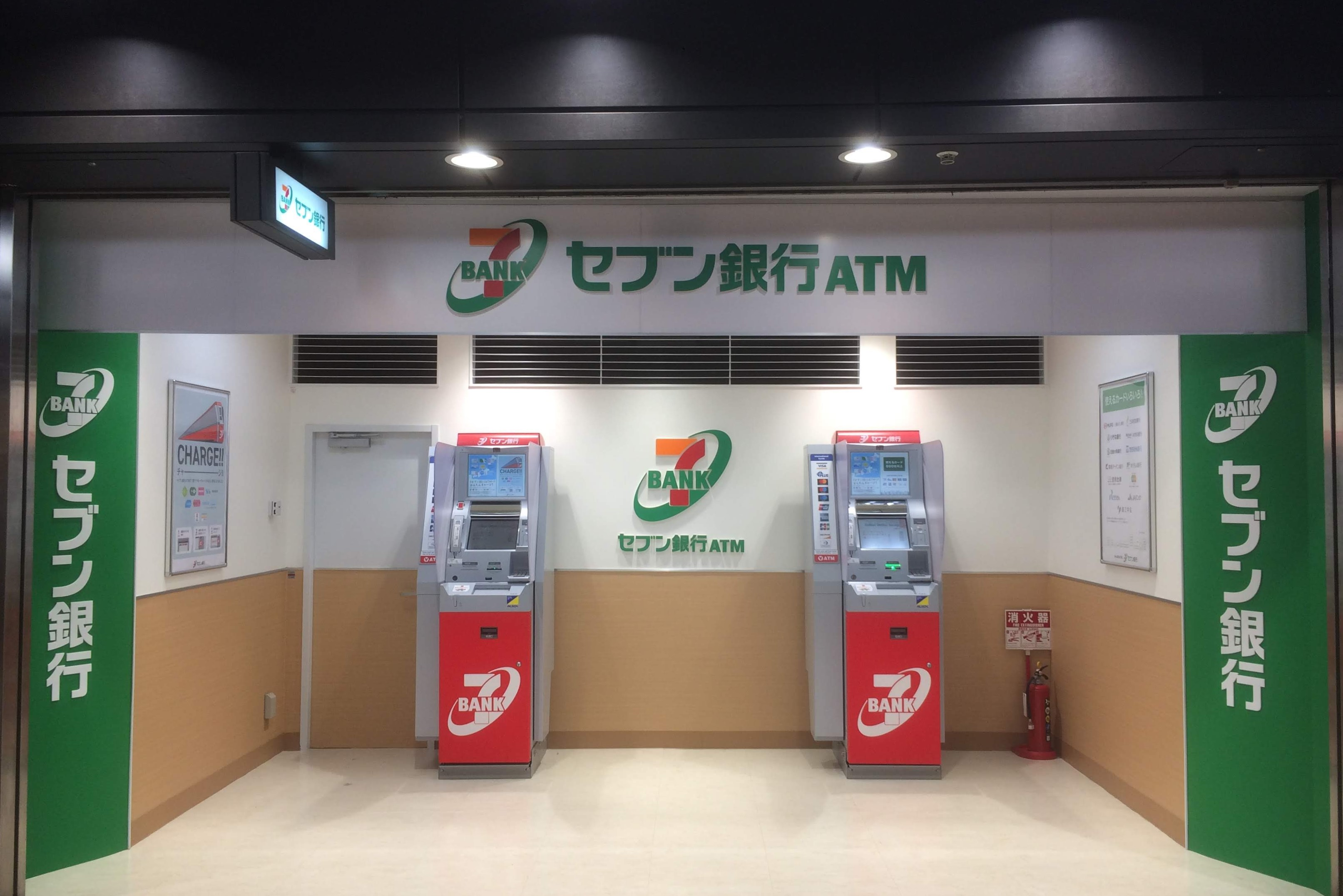
Two Seven Bank ATMs in Osaka (March 2019).

Seven Bank, Ltd. (株式会社セブン銀行, Kabushiki-gaisha Sebun Ginkō) is a Japanese bank. It is an affiliate of Seven-Eleven Japan, a wholly-owned subsidiary of Seven & I Holdings.

== History ==
The bank received a provisional banking license from the Financial Services Agency in 2000, and began operations on April 10, 2001 as IY Bank (アイワイバンク銀行, Ai-wai Banku Ginkō), taking its initials from Ito Yokado. In its early years, the bank conducted its business primarily through the Internet, IY Bank has automatic teller machines in 7-Eleven convenience stores and Ito Yokado general-merchandise stores in Japan, and on April 27, 2005, opened its first branch with live staff. Customers with accounts at certain banks can process transactions at IY terminals at no cost; IY collects a handling fee from customers at other banks. The bank was renamed as Seven Bank on October 11, 2005.

Seven Bank began accepting foreign-issued ATM and credit cards in June 2007. Cards with Visa, Plus, American Express, Discover, JCB, Diners Club or China UnionPay logos on them are all accepted to withdraw yen from the machines.

In December 2009, Seven Bank discontinued ATM services for MasterCard, Maestro and Cirrus cards. Seven Bank said that from their perspective, a revision of the terms and conditions on the part of MasterCard did not "sustain the economic viability of (Mastercard) services". ATM services for MasterCard, Maestro and Cirrus cardholders were restored in August 2010, but were suspended again in April 2013 for similar reasons.

On March 22, 2011, Seven Bank and Western Union started the Seven Bank International Money Transfer Service as part of their mobile and internet banking services. On July 19, 2011, the service was expanded to Seven Bank ATMs, which has about 16,000 locations nationwide with English and Japanese telephone customer support. On November 7, 2011, localized telephone support in Chinese, Spanish, Portuguese and Tagalog was started in order to assist customers using the service.

In June 2024, the bank announced that it will be expanding its presence to Malaysia, its fourth overseas market after the United States, Indonesia and the Philippines.

== Services ==
Seven Bank in Japan is known for their 24/7 ATMs, often located inside 7-Eleven and Ito-Yokado stores, shopping malls, train stations and airports. They have therefore become popular among foreign tourists looking to withdraw Japanese yen banknotes. As of March 2024, Seven Bank reported that they had 27,422 ATMs installed nationwide, only beaten by Japan Post Bank with 31,157 ATMs in total.

In its domestic retail banking sector, Seven Bank provides a JCB debit card with IC card and nanaco capabilities to customers when opening a deposit account with them. They also offer checking accounts, fixed-term deposits and unsecured card loans.
