= Seven & I Holdings =

Japanese retail company

Coordinates: 35°41′8.82″N 139°44′2.35″E

Seven & I Holdings Co., Ltd.

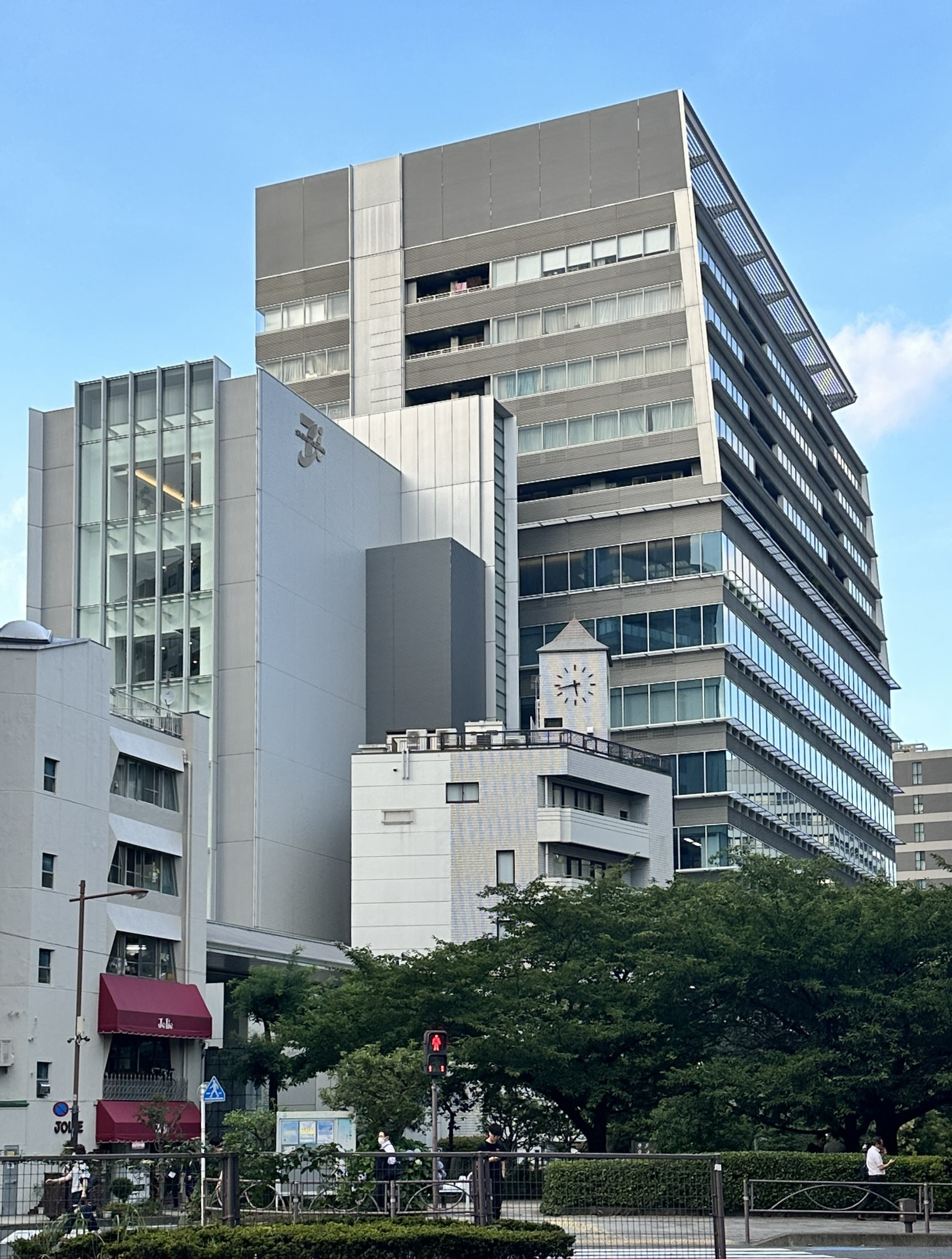
- Seven & I Holdings headquarters in Nibancho, Chiyoda, Tokyo
- Native name: 株式会社セブン&アイ・ホールディングス
- Romanized name: Kabushiki gaisha Sebun ando Ai Hōrudingusu
- Type: Public
- Traded as: TYO: 3382; TOPIX Core 30 Component
- Industry: Retail
- Founded: 1 September 2005; 21 years ago (from merger)
- Headquarters: 8-8 Nibanchō, Chiyoda, Tokyo, Japan
- Key people: Stephen Hayes Dacus (president & Representative Director)
- Services: Department stores, Superstores, Supermarkets, Convenience stores, Restaurants, Financial services
- Revenue: ▼US$80.125 billion (2023)
- Net income: ▼US$1.569 billion (2023)
- Total assets: US$70.789 billion (2023)
- Total equity: US$20.290 billion (2023)
- Number of employees: 117,540 (2023)
- Subsidiaries: List: Seven-Eleven Japan; Seven & I Food Systems; Seven Financial Service; Seven & I Net Media
- Website: www.7andi.com/en/

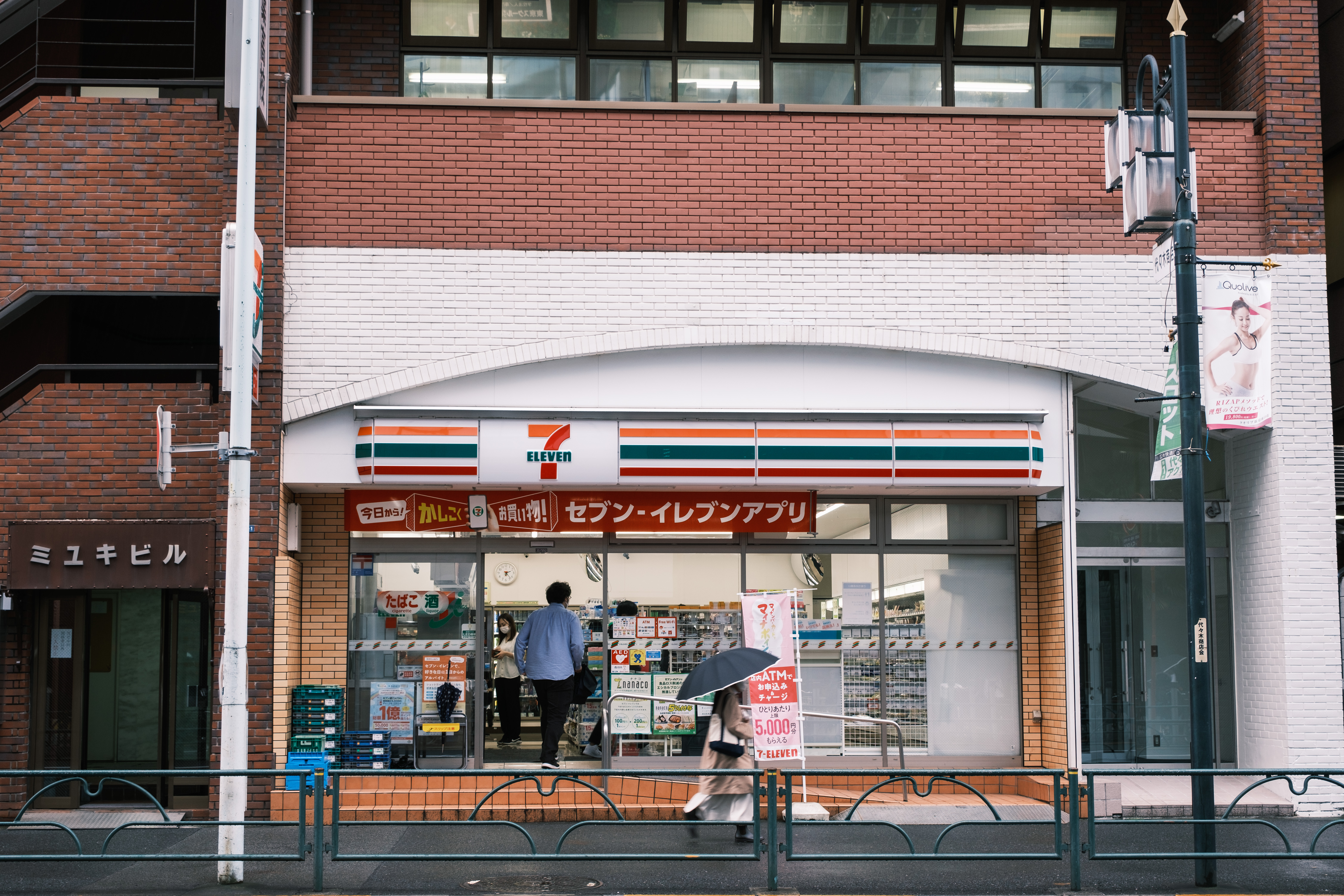
A 7-Eleven convenience store in Japan

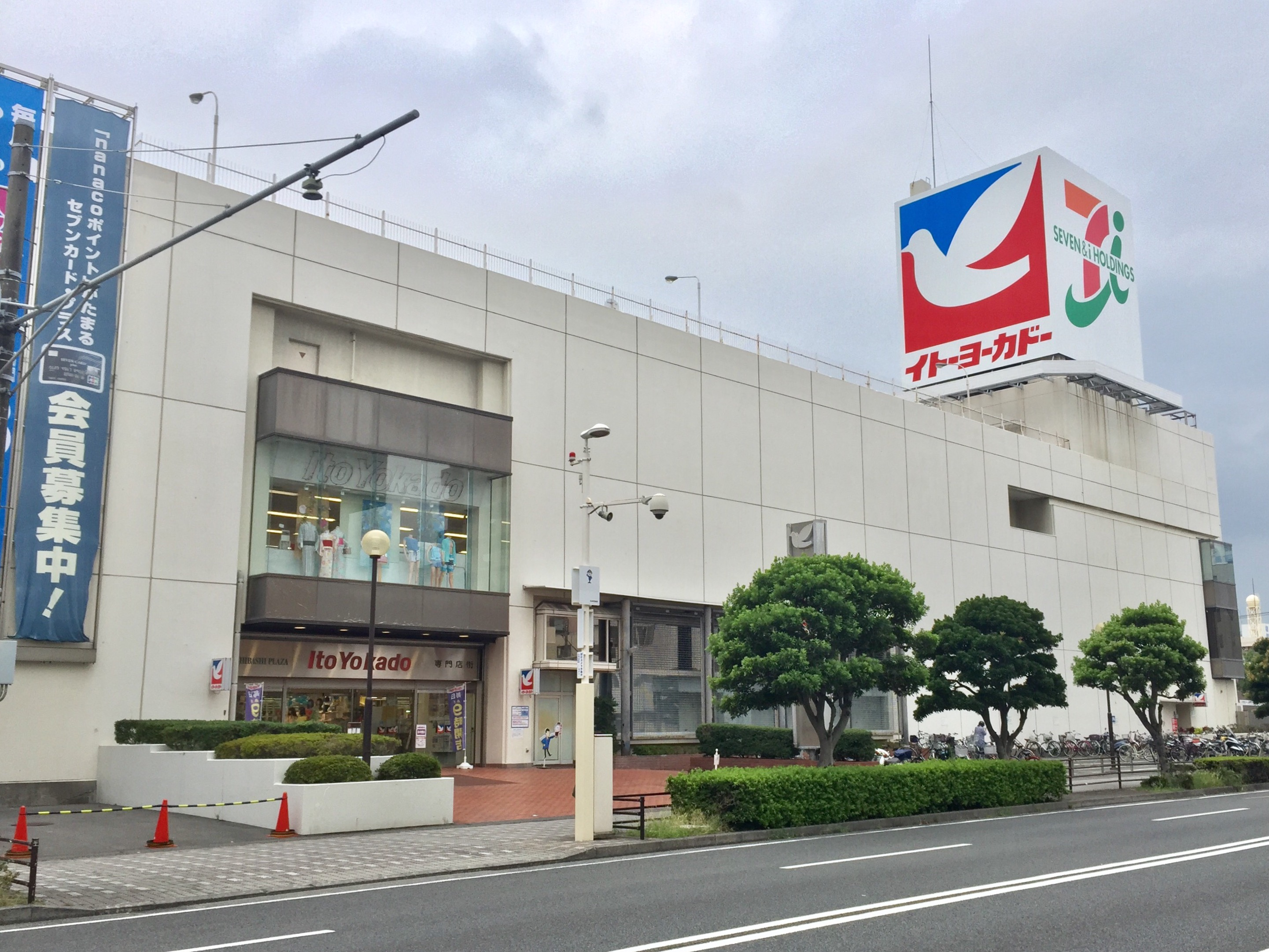
Ito-Yokado store in Numazu featuring the revived "Pigeon Mark"

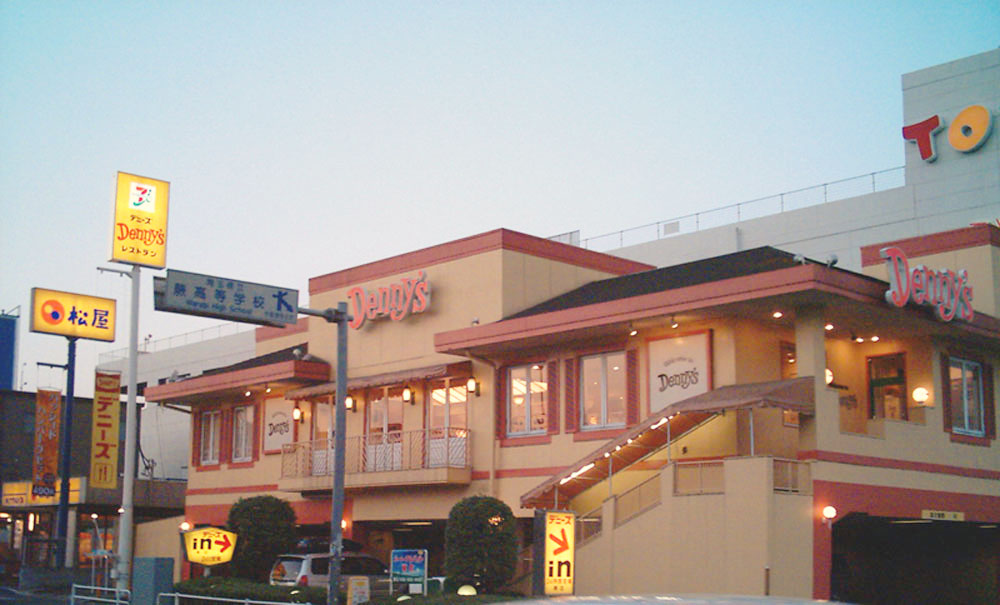
Denny's diner-style restaurant in Warabi, Saitama, still displaying the old "Denny's" logotype that was used in the United States between 1973 and 1994

Seven & I Holdings Co., Ltd. (株式会社セブン&アイ・ホールディングス) is a Japanese diversified retail holdings company headquartered in Nibanchō, Chiyoda, Tokyo. On September 1, 2005, it was established as a result of the integration of three companies: Ito-Yokado, Seven-Eleven Japan, and Denny's Japan. The purpose of this establishment was to create a holding company that would own these three companies. The background behind this decision was that the parent company, Ito-Yokado, was facing deteriorating performance, while its subsidiary, Seven-Eleven Japan, was experiencing growth in both sales and profits and was performing well.

Following a downturn in the performance of its supermarket operations, on September 1, 2025, the company spun off including Ito-Yokado, Denny's Japan, and Loft, into an intermediate holding company named York Holdings, transferring it to the U.S. investment fund Bain Capital.

== History ==
On April 20, 2005, the supermarket chain Ito-Yokado announced the establishment of a holding company called Seven & I Holdings in September of the same year. This holding company was formed in collaboration with its subsidiary convenience store chain, Seven-Eleven Japan, and the restaurant chain, Denny's Japan. At the time, Ito-Yokado, which was facing declining performance, had a market capitalization that was approximately 70% of the rapidly growing Seven-Eleven, causing an imbalance in the parent-child relationship within the group. The purpose of this restructuring was to resolve this imbalance and prepare for hostile takeovers. At the time, Ito-Yokado held over 50% of the issued shares of both Seven-Eleven and Denny's. After the restructuring, all three companies became 100% subsidiaries of the holding company. This restructuring also included other entities like Aiwai Bank (later renamed Seven Bank) and York-Benimaru, which were brought under the umbrella of the holding company. The group as a whole aimed to collaborate on product development, procurement, and the consolidation of management functions.

In November 2005, Seven & I acquired the shares of 7-Eleven, Inc. through a public tender offer, making it a wholly owned subsidiary via Seven-Eleven Japan.

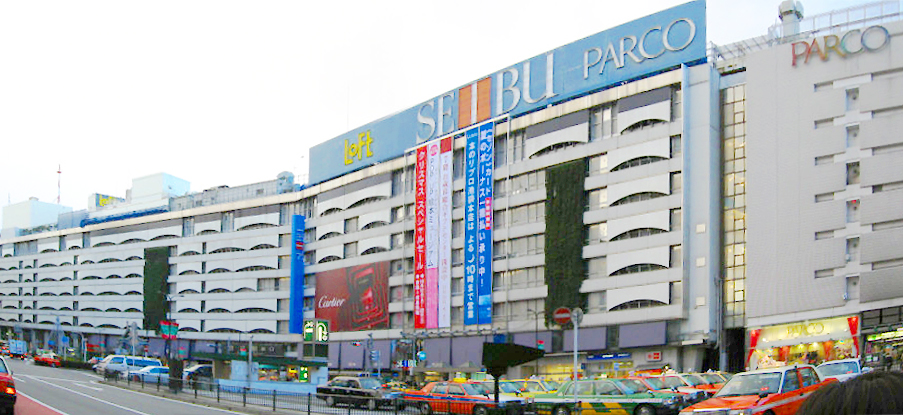
Seibu Department Store in Ikebukuro, Tokyo

On December 25, 2005, Seven & I solidified its plans to merge with Millennium Retailing, which owns the department stores Seibu and Sogo. On December 26, Seven & I officially announced its intention to bring Millennium Retailing under its umbrella and integrate their operations by June of the following year. The combined domestic sales of both groups would reach a scale of 5 trillion yen when simply added together, surpassing Japan's largest Aeon Group. Their global sales, including U.S.-based 7-Eleven, would exceed 7 trillion yen, ranking them around second place in the world. While Seven-Eleven Japan and the financial business were performing well, the supermarket industry was experiencing declining sales. The integration with Millennium Retailing aimed to achieve operational efficiency through the consolidation of management functions and other measures. Millennium Retailing had already completed the revitalization of its subsidiaries Seibu and Sogo and was planning to go public in the next two to three years. However, they chose the path of integration with Seven & I instead.

On August 11, 2006, Seven & I purchased Lombard, Illinois-based White Hen.

In 2010, Seven & I acquired 21.58% of Tower Records Japan.

On June 11, 2012, Seven & I, through its 7-Eleven, Inc. subsidiary, acquired 23 convenience stores in the U.S. from Strasburger Enterprises, Inc.

On December 4, 2013, Seven & I purchased 44.99% ownership of Barneys Japan Co., Ltd. from "a fund operated by Tokio Marine Capital". Barneys Japan "has a network of 10 stores in Japan, including five outlet stores" and, "for the year ending February 2013, Barneys Japan posted sales of ¥19.52 billion." After this transaction, Sumitomo Corporation will continue to retain a majority stake of 50.01% in Barneys Japan Co., Ltd.

On January 29, 2014, Seven & I, through its subsidiary Seven & I Net Media, acquired 50.71% of Nissen Holdings, which is engaged in the mail order sale of clothing and daily necessities, the retail and wholesale of gift products through stores, catalogs, Internet and mobiles. Also, Nissen is involved in the life insurance, casualty insurance agency, credit card and money lending business. Full ownership of the subsidiary was achieved in November 2016.

On April 6, 2017, Seven & I announced they would be acquiring 1110 convenience stores from American fuel company Sunoco for $3.3 billion, as well as that they would be supplied 2.2 billion gallons of fuel annually from Sunoco for 15 years. Sunoco said they would be selling 200 more stores to Seven & I in Q4, 2017.

The current president of Seven & I, Ryuichi Isaka, was appointed to that position on May 26, 2016, replacing Noritoshi Murata, who resigned his position along with Chief Executive and Chairman Toshifumi Suzuki in April 2016, after activist investor Daniel Loeb, who owns an undisclosed stake in Seven & I through his investment company Third Point, raised concerns about rumours that Suzuki was grooming his son, Yasuhiro Suzuki, as his successor.

In July 2019, 7-Eleven launched, then almost immediately suspended, a mobile payment service, 7pay. The service was hacked upon launch and attackers were able to spend money from affected customers' accounts. The service was announced to be entirely cancelled following a review of the infrastructure it ran on.

On August 2, 2020, Seven & I announced they were purchasing convenience store competitor Speedway LLC from Marathon Petroleum for $21 billion. The deal had closed on May 14, 2021.

In April 2023, Barneys Japan was sold to Laox Holdings.

On January 26, 2021, the U.S. investment fund ValueAct Capital, which owns approximately 4.4% of the shares, demanded that Seven & I, a company in which they hold an ownership stake, focus on its convenience store business, which accounts for a significant portion of Seven & I's operating profit.

On November 11, 2022, Seven & I announced the sale of Sogo and Seibu (formerly Millennium Retailing) to the U.S. investment fund Fortress Investment Group. On September 1, 2023, they formally confirmed the sale to the investment fund. The sale price of Sogo and Seibu was reduced from the initially planned 250 billion yen to 220 billion yen. Seven & I relinquished 916 billion yen worth of debt out of the 1,659 billion yen it held against Sogo and Seibu to alleviate the financial burden on Sogo and Seibu. The company announced that the final transfer price would be 85 million yen by adjusting for the net debt and working capital of Sogo & Seibu and its subsidiaries. In response to this sale, the Sogo and Seibu labor union conducted a strike on August 31.

In November 2023, Seven & I purchased the Australian franchise of 7-Eleven from the Withers and Barlow families for 1.71 billion AUD.

On August 19, 2024, Canadian multinational convenience store operator Alimentation Couche-Tard Inc. offered to buy Seven & I. On September 6, 2024, the C$38.7 billion takeover bid was rejected by Seven & I as too low and fraught with regulatory risk, although a "sweetened offer" would be considered. On October 9, 2024, Seven & I acknowledged it had an increased bid from Alimentation Couche-Tard, which was worth $47 billion. The next day, Seven & I announced it would be separating its non-core assets in a new holding company called York Holdings and rename itself 7-Eleven Corp. Seven & I's founding family then explored a possibility of an outright buyout of the company worth $58 billion, but at the end of February 2025 it was announced that the plan had been scrapped after major trading company Itochu withdrew their financial support.

On March 6, 2025, the company announced a major restructuring. As part of this plan, Ryuichi Isaka would resign from Seven & I and would be replaced by Stephen Hayes Dacus. The company's supermarket and restaurant division would be sold to Bain Capital. SEJ would divest its North American convenience store businesses which would be the second IPO for 7-Eleven and continue its plans to divest Seven Bank. The sale of the supermarket and restaurant division to York Holdings was scheduled to be completed in September 2025 while the IPO of SEI is planned to be completed by the following year.

On July 10, 2025, Seven & I confirmed in a financial results briefing that there has been no significant progress on the Couche-Tard bid, while on July 16, 2025, Couche-Tard announced that it has dropped its bid on Seven & I due to an alleged "calculated campaign of obfuscation and delay" by Seven & I management.

On September 1, 2025, Seven & I Holdings announced the completion of the sale of York Holdings, a subsidiary bundling non-core businesses such as supermarkets and restaurants, to Bain Capital. Under the terms of the agreement finalized in March 2025, the division was valued at ¥814.7 billion. Seven & I and its founding family reinvested to retain a combined 40% stake, making York Holdings an equity-method affiliate, while Bain Capital acquired a 60% stake with an investment of approximately ¥490 billion. This transaction allowed Seven & I to concentrate its focus on its core convenience store business, while placing 29 companies—including Ito-Yokado, Denny's Japan, Loft, and Akachan Honpo, which collectively account for approximately ¥1.6 trillion in total sales—under Bain's management to pursue renewed growth.

In July 2026, Seven & i Holdings announced strategic and capital partnerships with SoftBank Corp., PayPay and Sumitomo Mitsui Card. The three companies agreed to invest ¥100 billion each, for a combined ¥300 billion, through a third-party allotment of Seven & i treasury shares. The allotment was completed in August 2026 as part of a broader partnership involving digital payments, technology and customer services.

== Subsidiaries and affiliates ==
=== Subsidiaries ===
- Seven-Eleven Japan (based in Japan)
  - SEJ Finance and SEJ Service holding companies (based in the United States)
    - 7-Eleven (based in the United States and Australia)
      - Stripes Convenience Stores
      - Speedway - acquired in 2021
      - 7-Eleven International
        - 7-Eleven Australia - acquired in 2023
- Seven & I Net Media
  - Nissen Holdings - catalog, online retailing, real store sales

=== Affiliates ===
- YORK Holdings (Bain Capital 60%, Seven & I Holdings 35%, others 5%)
  - Ito-Yokado - supermarket chain
  - York-Benimaru - supermarket chain
  - Shell Garden - upscale grocery stores
  - Akachan Honpo - baby products retailer
  - Denny's Japan - operating Denny's restaurants in Japan; the company has held an exclusive trademark right of using "Denny's" (name, logo, etc.) in Japan since 1984 and operates independently of Denny's Corporation (without any licensing or franchise agreements)
  - Loft (75.2%) - retail stores specializing in stationery, household goods, kitchenware, cosmetics, and specialty items
  - Create Link - commercial facility development, tenant leasing, and property management
- Tower Records Japan (NTT Docomo 65%, Seven & I Holdings 45%)
- Seven Bank (33.38%, TYO: 8410) - online banking & operating ATMs at Seven-Eleven and FamilyMart stores in Japan

=== Former subsidiaries ===
- Sogo & Seibu - sold to Fortress Investment Group in 2023

== Senior leadership ==
Seven & I has been led by a president & CEO since the founding of the group in 2005. The current president is Stephen Hayes Dacus, the first foreigner to be appointed as president & CEO in the company's history.

=== List of presidents and CEOs ===
1. Toshifumi Suzuki (2005–2016)
2. Ryuichi Isaka (2016–2025)
3. Stephen Hayes Dacus (since May 2025)
