= Ito-Yokado =

Japanese retail company

Ito-Yokado Co., Ltd.

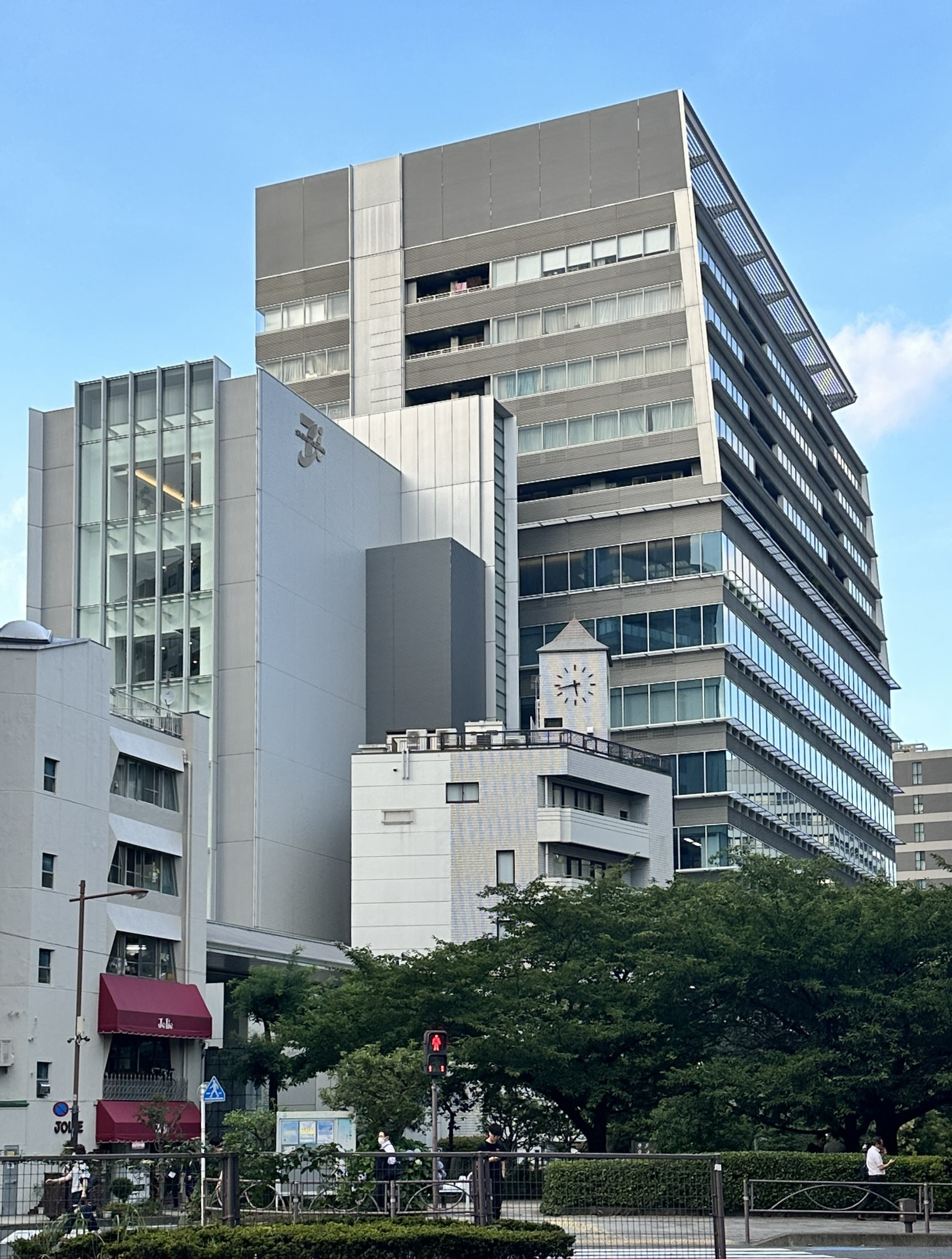
- Ito-Yokado headquarters in Nibancho, Chiyoda, Tokyo
- Native name: 株式会社イトーヨーカ堂
- Romanized name: Kabushiki-gaisha Itō Yōkadō
- Type: Subsidiary
- Founded: 1920; 106 years ago
- Area served: Japan, China
- Owner: York Holdings
- Website: www.itoyokado.co.jp

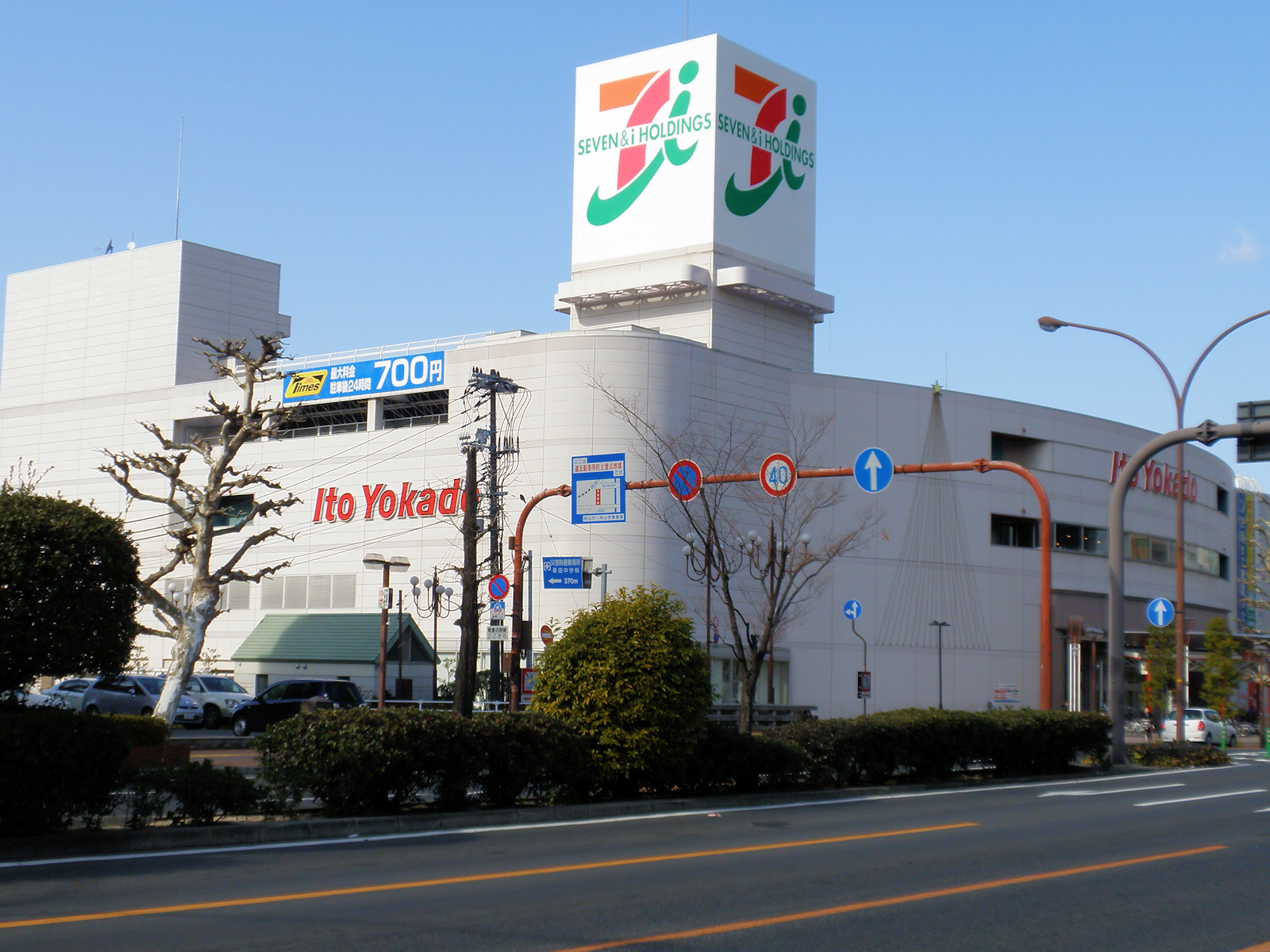
An Ito-Yokado store in Okayama, January 2010

Ito-Yokado Co., Ltd. (株式会社イトーヨーカ堂, Kabushiki-gaisha Itō Yōkadō) is a Japanese general merchandise, shopping center, grocery store and department store originally founded in 1920. In 2005, it was reorganized, as part of a corporate restructuring, as a subsidiary of the Seven & I Holdings Co.

As of February 2023, there were 126 Ito-Yokado stores operating in Japan. In 2023 the company announced that it would be closing down 33 stores. Ito-Yokado entered the Chinese market in 1996, opening the first store in Chengdu, Sichuan province. As of 2023, the company has 12 stores in China, with 1 in Beijing, 11 in Sichuan.

== Musical codes ==
Inside Ito-Yokado, the staff working at the register can play instrumentals of famous musical pieces, which is a code to workers in the store for specific things to do. These are:

- Help! (The Beatles) - A call for additional staff to man the tills during periods of high customer traffic.
- Daydream Believer (The Monkees) - Played during ordinary operation.
- Rhythm of the Rain (The Cascades) - To inform customers of heavy rain outside the building.
- Carmen (Georges Bizet) - Robbery and other criminal activities in the premises.
- Symphony No. 5, 1st. Movement (Allegro con brio) (Beethoven) - Bomb threat.
