= Department stores in Japan =

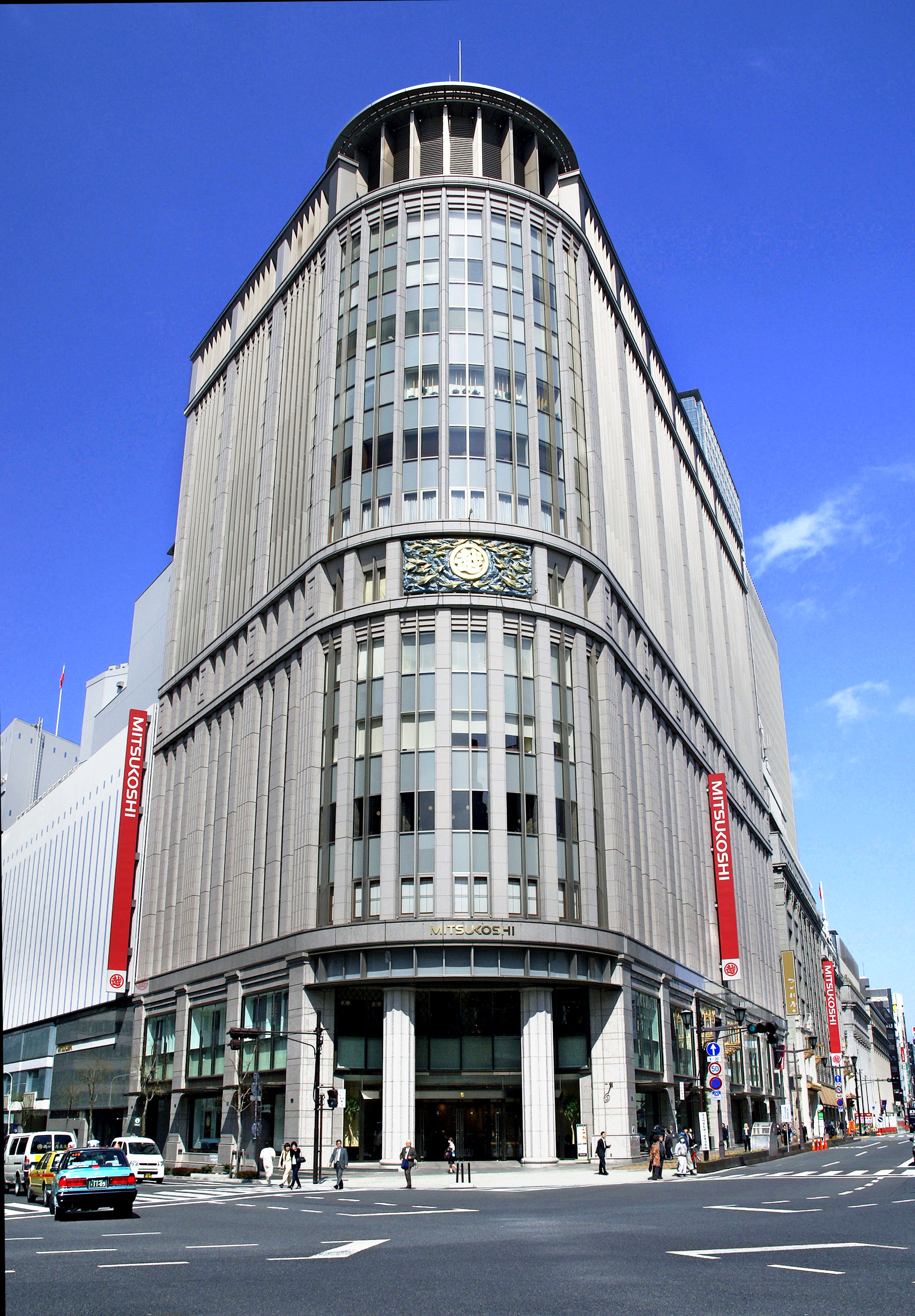
Mitsukoshi in Nihonbashi, Tokyo

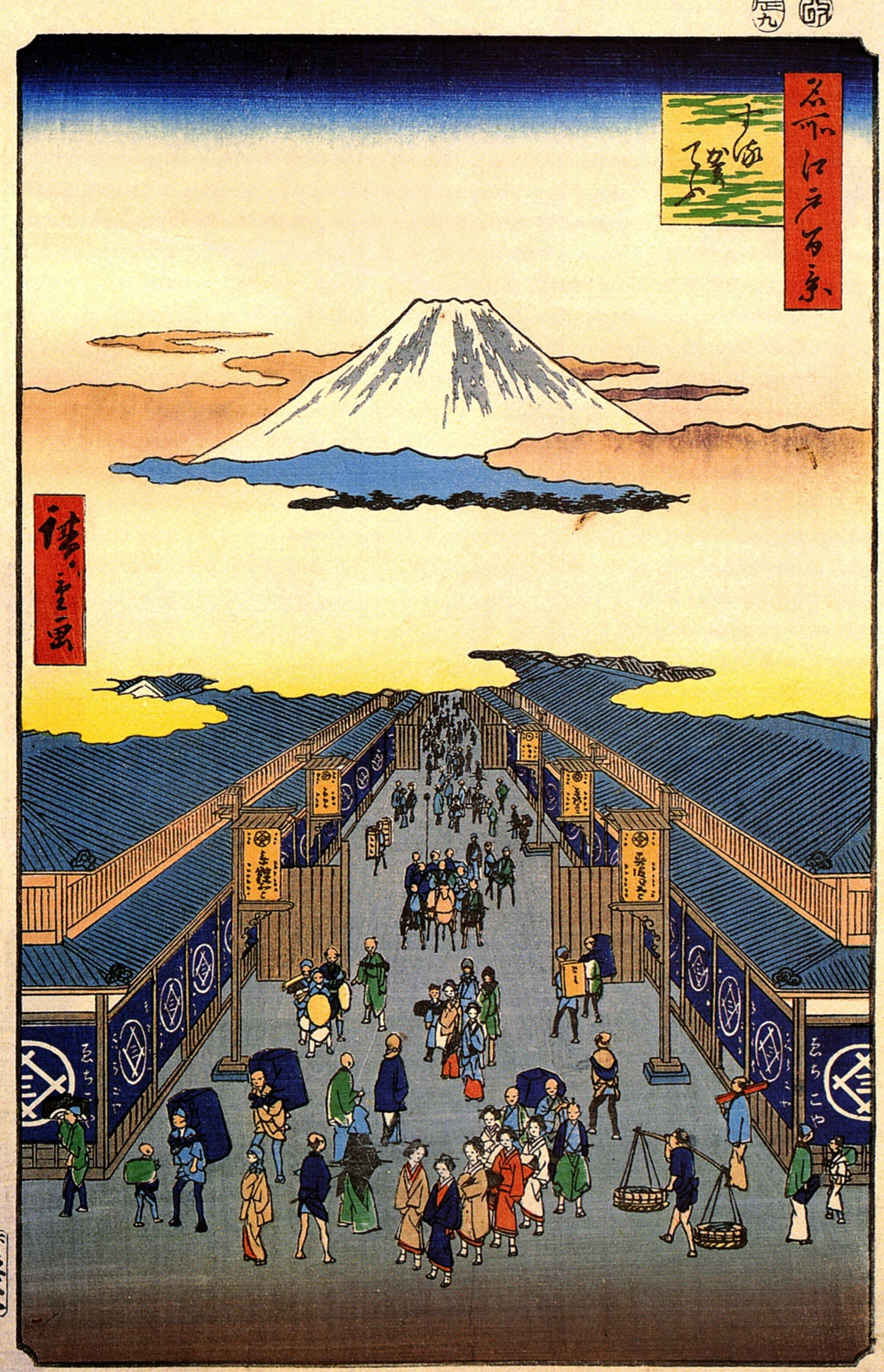
An 1856 ukiyo-e depicting Echigoya, the current Mitsukoshi.

Department stores in Japan are referred to as hyakkaten (百貨店) or depāto (デパート), an alteration of the English term.

== History ==
The first "modern-style" department store in Japan was Mitsukoshi, founded in 1904, which has its root as a kimono store called Echigoya from 1673. However, Matsuzakaya has an even longer history, dating from 1611. The kimono store changed to a department store in 1910. In 1924, the Matsuzakaya store in Ginza allowed street shoes to be worn indoors, something innovative at the time. These former kimono-shop-turned-department-stores dominated the market in its early department store history. They sold, or instead displayed, luxurious product which contributed to their sophisticated atmospheres. Some Japanese department stores were developed by railway companies. There have been many private railway operators in the nation and, from the 1920s, they started to build department stores directly linked to their lines' termini. Both Seibu and Hankyu were developed by rail companies.

Since the 1980s, Japanese department stores have been facing fierce competition from supermarkets and convenience stores. Nonetheless, depāto are bastions of several aspects of cultural conservatism in the country so they have continued to thrive, in contrast to department store chains in the United States and Canada which continue to decline and/or have went bankrupt. Giving gift certificates for prestigious department stores is used as a formal present in Japan.

From 1991 to 2008, sales per square meter dropped significantly: 43% in Osaka and 45% in Tokyo. Despite this, in the early 2010s, in Osaka in particular, there was a 50% increase in total floor space in the two key shopping districts of Umeda (around JR Osaka Station) and Minami (Namba-Shinsaibashi). In Umeda, West Japan Railiway Isetan^{(ja)} opened a new 50,000 m^{2} (538,196 sq ft) flagship-style store, triggering major expansion by its neighbors Hankyu (from 61,000 to 84,000 m^{2}) and Daimaru (from 40,000 to 64,000 m^{2}), while Hanshin remained at 54,000 m^{2}. In Minami, Takashimaya expanded from 56,000 to 78,000 m^{2}, and in Abeno, Kintetsu grew from 48,000 to a whopping 100,000 m^{2}, making it the largest department store in Japan. The resulting market saturation led West JR–Isetan to close in 2015, less than 4 years after opening; two-thirds of the space was converted to midsize shops and rechristened "LUCUA 1100"^{(ja)}.

== Product and service range ==
Department stores in Japan generally offer a wide range of services and can include foreign exchange, travel reservations, ticket sales for local concerts and other events.

Due to their roots, many Japanese department stores have sections devoted to kimono and traditional Japanese crafts, including pottery and lacquerware. The basement level usually has a grocery and food court, and on the roof may be garden and aquatic supplies, pets, and a children's play area.

Operating hours are usually from 10 am to 8 pm. Some close one day a week, often a weekday.

== Famous department stores in Japan ==
Some stores also have branches outside Japan.

=== Nationwide ===
- ÆON (イオン株式会社, ÆON)
- Daimaru Matsuzakaya Department Stores (株式会社大丸松坂屋百貨店)
  - Daimaru (大丸)
  - Matsuzakaya (松坂屋)
- Hands (ハンズ, Hanzu)
- Hankyu Department Stores (阪急百貨店, Hankyū Hyakkaten)
- Isetan Mitsukoshi Holdings (株式会社三越伊勢丹ホールディングス)
  - Isetan (伊勢丹)
  - Mitsukoshi (三越)
- Parco (パルコ, Paruko) (fashion oriented, nationwide)
- Sogo & Seibu (そごう・西武)
  - Loft (ロフト, Rofuto) (hobby oriented, nationwide)
  - Seibu Department Stores (西武百貨店, Seibu Hyakkaten)
  - Seiyu Group (西友グループ)
  - Sogo (そごう, Sogō)
- Takashimaya (高島屋)

=== Hokkaido ===
- Marui Imai (丸井今井) - part of Isetan Mitsukoshi Holdings

=== Kantō region ===
- Keio Department Store (京王百貨店, Keiō Hyakkaten)
- Marui (丸井) (fashion oriented)
- Lumine (ルミネ, Rumine) (fashion oriented)
- Matsuya (松屋)
- Odakyu Department Store (小田急百貨店, Odakyū Hyakkaten)
- Tobu Department Store (東武百貨店, Tōbu Hyakkaten)
- Tokyu Department Store (東急百貨店, Tōkyū Hyakkaten)
  - 109 (Ichi-maru-kyū) (fashion oriented, Kantō region)
  - Tokyu Hands (東急ハンズ, Tōkyū Hanzu) (hobby oriented, nationwide)

=== Chūbu region ===
- Daiwa (大和)
- Entetsu Department Store (遠鉄百貨店, Entetsu Hyakkaten)
- Meitetsu Department Store (名鉄百貨店, Meitetsu Hyakkaten)

=== Kansai region ===
- Keihan Department Store (京阪百貨店, Keihan Hyakkaten)
- Kintetsu Department Store (近鉄百貨店, Kintetsu Hyakkaten)
- Sanyo Department Store (山陽百貨店, San'yō Hyakkaten)
- Hanshin Department Store (阪神百貨店, Hanshin Hyakkaten)
- yamatoyashiki (ヤマトヤシキ)
- Fujii Daimaru (藤井大丸, Fujii Daimaru)

=== Chūgoku, Shikoku region ===
- Tenmaya (天満屋)
- Fukuya (福屋)
- Chimakiya (ちまきや)
- Ichibata Department Store (一畑百貨店, Ichibata Hyakkaten)

=== Kyūshū region ===
- Iwataya (岩田屋) - part of Istean Mitsukoshi Holdings
- Izutsuya (井筒屋)
- Tokiwa (トキハ)
- Tamaya Department Store (玉屋)
- Hamaya (浜屋)
- Tsuruya Department Store (鶴屋百貨店, Tsuruya Hyakkaten)
- Yamakataya (山形屋)
- Ryubo (リウボウ, Ryūbō)

=== Defunct in Japan ===
- Shirokiya (白木屋)
- Printemps Ginza (プランタン銀座, Purantan Ginza) (from Yomiuri Group and Isetan Mitsukoshi)
- Robinson Department Store (ロビンソン百貨店, Robinson Hyakkaten) (from Sogo & Seibu)
- Yaohan Co., Ltd. (株式会社ヤオハン)
