= Seibu =

Seibu may refer to:

- Seibu Holdings or a subsidiary thereof
  - Saitama Seibu Lions
  - Seibu Railway
- Sogo & Seibu
  - Seibu Department Stores, owned by Sogo & Seibu
- Seibu Kaihatsu
