= Robinson Department Store (Japan) =

Robinson Department Store Co., Ltd. 株式会社ロビンソン百貨店
- Type: Subsidiary
- Industry: Retailing
- Founded: October 31, 1984
- Defunct: September 1, 2009
- Fate: Merged
- Successor: Sogo & Seibu
- Headquarters: Kasukabe, Saitama, Japan
- Number of locations: 2 (Kasukabe and Odawara)
- Services: Department stores
- Parent: Sogo & Seibu

Robinson Department Store (ロビンソン百貨店, Robinson Hyakkaten), also known as Robinson's, was a Japanese department store franchise run by Sogo & Seibu.

== History ==
In 1984, Ito-Yokado, a company that co-operated with J. W. Robinson's backed by restructuring funds from the Sapporo branch of Matsuzakaya, started Robinson Japan (株式会社ロビンソン・ジャパン, Kabushiki Gaisha Robinson Jyapan). Following the next year, the first Robinson Japan store was open in Kasukabe, where the Tōbu Isesaki Line exists as it was outside of Ito-Yokado's area of dominance. Originally a Seibu Department Stores branch was planned in Kasukabe, but as Seibu's contract agreement was terminated during the construction, Ito-Yokado capitalize the opportunity to build the first Robinson Japan. This is in coincidence that the western exit of the Kasukabe Station is near the Kasukabe branch of Ito-Yokado.

== Stores ==
- Sapporo, Hokkaido (opened in June 1974 as York-Matsuzakaya, closed in January 2009)
- Kasukabe, Saitama (opened in November 1985)
- Utsunomiya, Tochigi (opened in January 1990, closed in September 2003)
- Odawara, Kanagawa in Dynacity WEST (ダイナシティWEST, Dainasiti Wesuto) (opened in September 2000)
