= Loft (store) =

Japanese household goods retail chain

The Loft Co., Ltd.
- Type: Subsidiary
- Industry: Retail
- Founded: (August 8, 1996)
- Headquarters: Shibuya, Tokyo
- Area served: Japan, Thailand
- Products: Household commodities
- Owner: Seven & i Holdings (70.7%); Credit Saison (10.6%)
- Parent: Seven & i Holdings
- Website: www.loft.co.jp

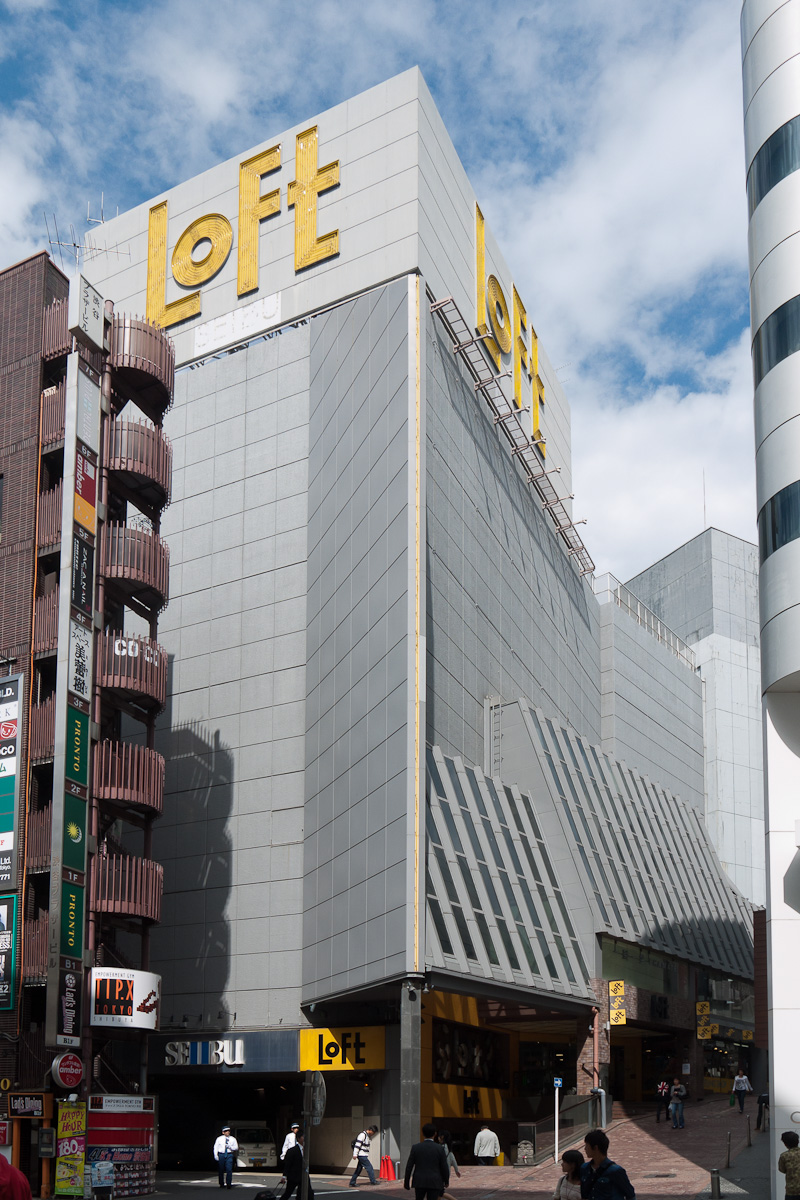
A Loft store in Shibuya, Tokyo

Loft (株式会社ロフト, Kabushiki Gaisha Rofuto) is a Japanese chain store that sells everyday commodities. There are Loft franchise stores in Japan and Thailand. Formerly a subsidiary of the Saison Group (セゾングループ, Sezon Gurūpu), it was the subsidiary of Sogo & Seibu at August 31, 2023.

Due to the sale of Sogo & Seibu by Seven & i Holdings, it is currently the subsidiary of Seven & i Holdings on September 1, 2023.

== See also ==
- Tokyu Hands, competitor
