= Daimaru =

Japanese department store chain

The Daimaru, Inc. 株式会社大丸
- Type: Public KK
- Industry: Retail
- Founded: Kyoto, Japan (April 16, 1920)
- Defunct: February 28, 2010
- Fate: Merged with Matsuzakaya
- Successor: Daimaru Matsuzakaya Department Stores Co., Ltd.
- Headquarters: Chūō-ku, Osaka, Japan
- Products: Daimaru department stores Daimaru Peacock supermarkets
- Revenue: 467.0 billion yen (2009)
- Number of employees: 3,292 (2007)
- Parent: J. Front Retailing
- Website: daimaru.co.jp/english/index.html

Daimaru (大丸) is a Japanese department store chain, principally located in the Kansai region of Japan. The chain is operated by Daimaru Matsuzakaya Department Stores, a subsidiary of J. Front Retailing. At one time Daimaru was an independent company, The Daimaru, Inc. (株式会社大丸), headquartered in Chūō-ku, Osaka.

It has been a member of the International Association of Department Stores from 1962 to 1982. As of 2016, Daimaru had seven stores in Japan, and employed about 3,000 people.

== History ==
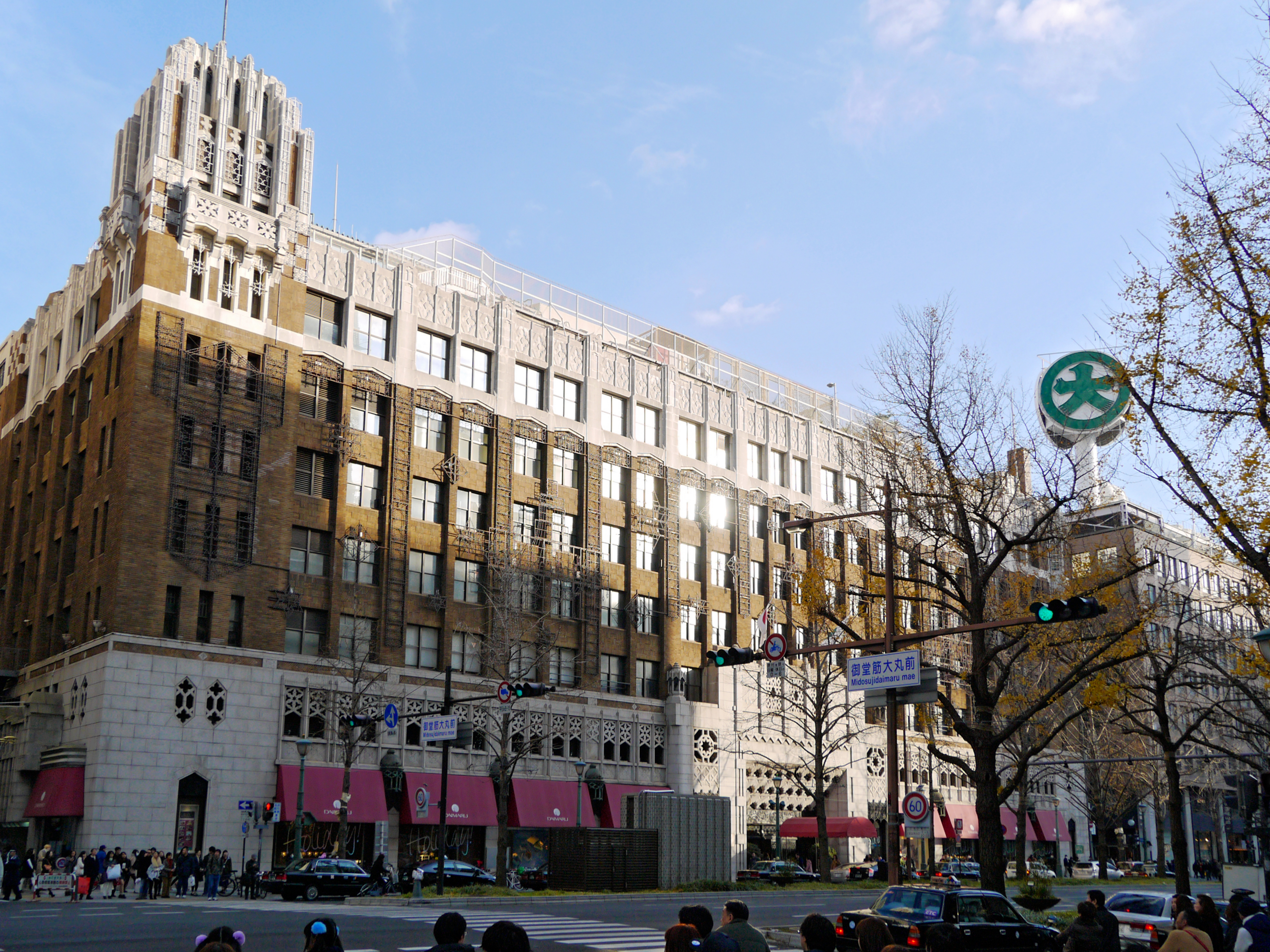
Daimaru is the landmark of Shinsaibashi, Osaka as a modern architecture built on 1922

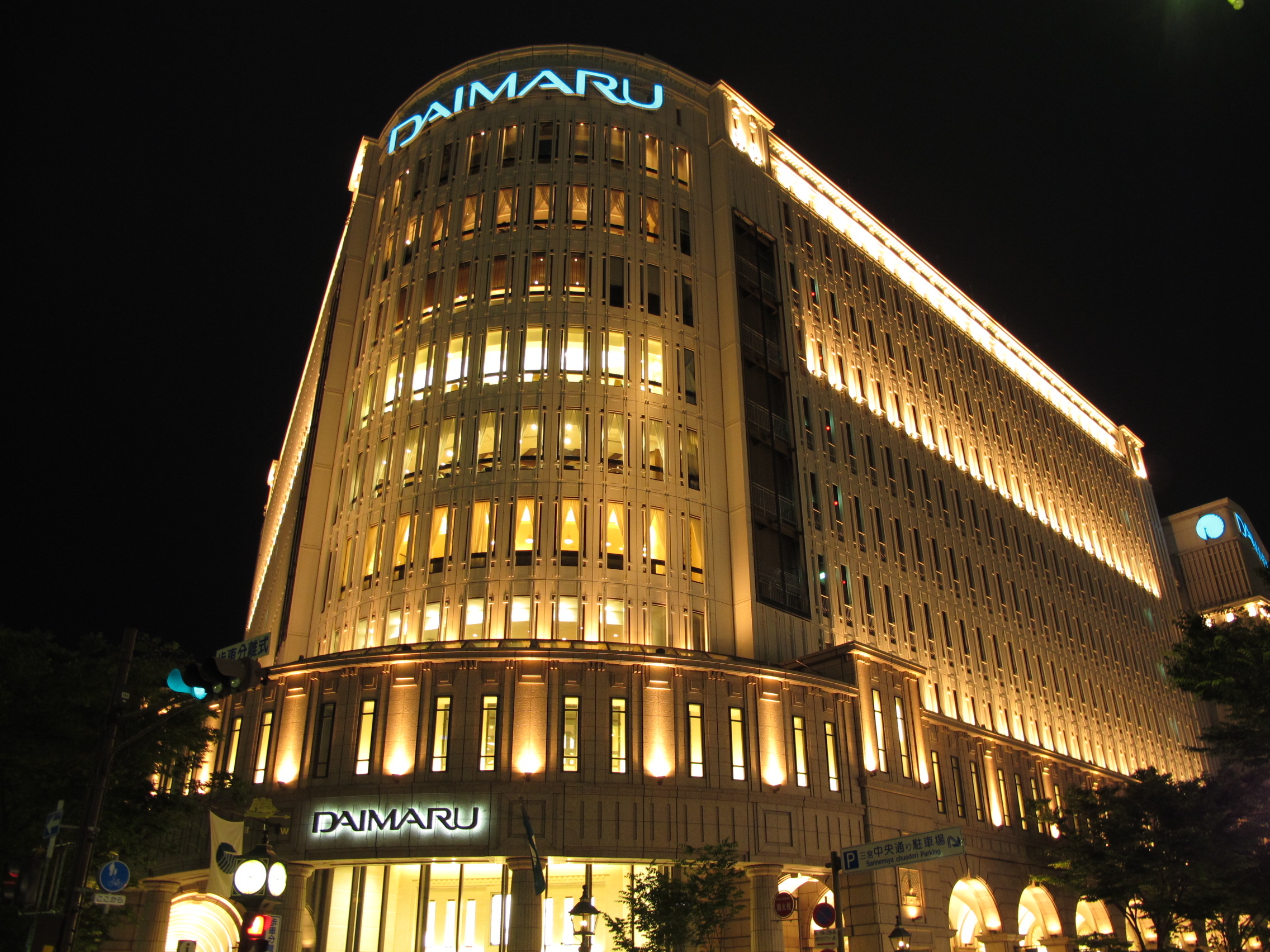
Kobe Daimaru at night

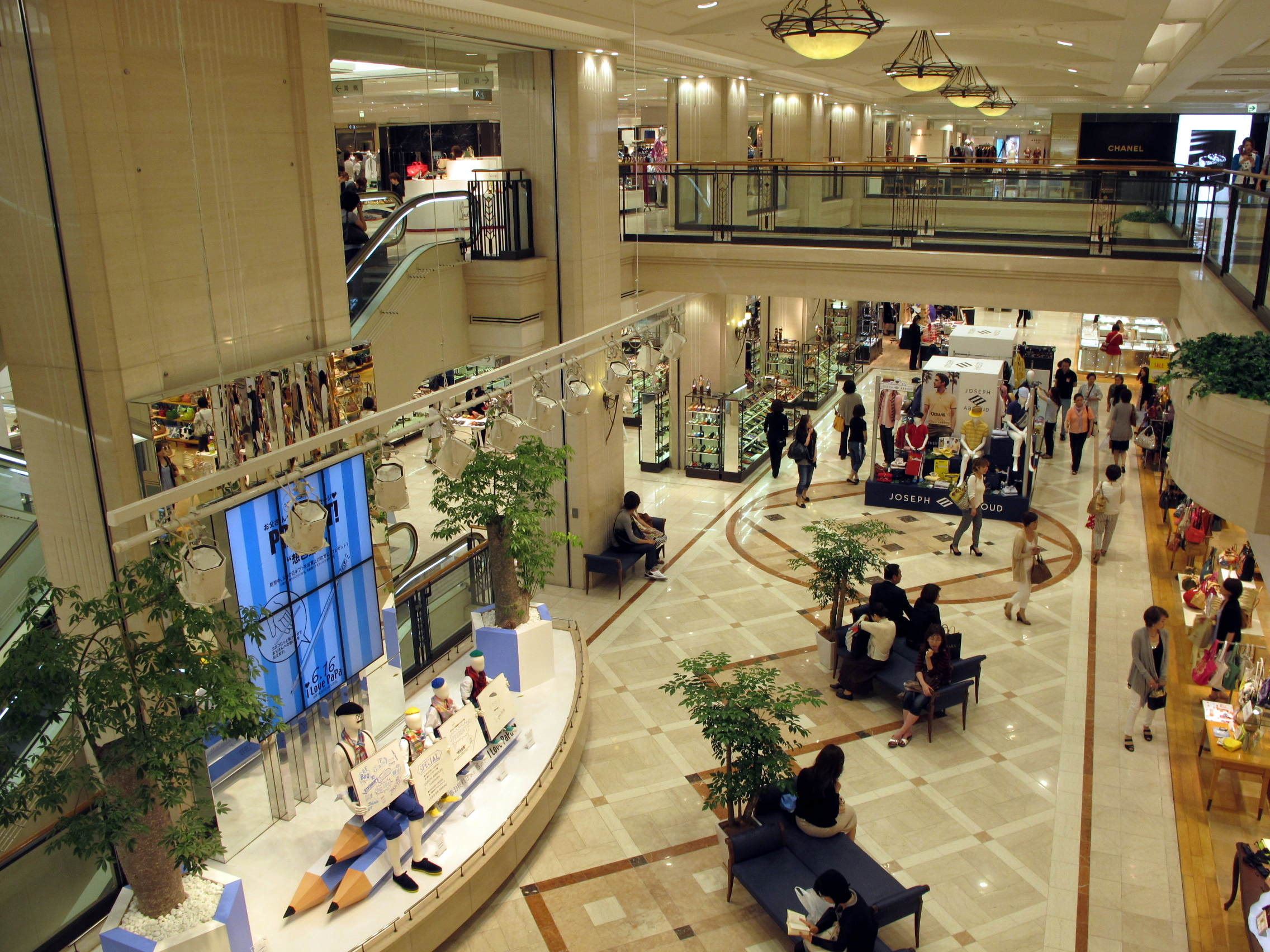
Kobe Daimaru Interior

Daimaru traces its history to Dai-Monjiya, a dry goods store in Kyoto founded by Shimomura Hikoemon Masahiro in 1717. The name "Daimaru" was first used for a store in Nagoya called Daimaruya, which opened in 1728.

The chain was incorporated in 1907 and reincorporated as Daimaru Dry Goods K.K. in 1920, changing its name to Daimaru in 1928. For several years in the 1960s, Daimaru was the largest retailer in Japan.

In 1960, Daimaru established a subsidiary called Peacock Sangyo. Now known as Daimaru Peacock, it operates 49 supermarkets in the Greater Tokyo Area, 28 in the Kansai region and 8 in the Chūbu region.

=== International expansion and closures ===
Daimaru expanded to Malaysia 1942 opening in Penang and later Singapore, operating by using John Little in 1943. The second Singaporean branch established a presence in November 1983 when Liang Court was opened. Daimaru would later close and reopen in 2003.

Its opened in Hong Kong in 1960 lasting until its exit from Hong Kong in 1998,

In the late 1964, it was the first Japanese department store to open in Thailand, under the name Thai Daimaru.

It opened its first store outside of Asia in Melbourne, Australia in 1991 operating across six levels of the Melbourne Central (in direct competition with Myer and David Jones). A second Australian store announced in 1996 opened on the Gold Coast in 1998. Daimaru announced its departure from the Australian market after nearly a decade of low profits in September 2001 commencing closure of both stores in late 2002.

In 1998, Daimaru entered into a partnership with the French grand couturier Dominique Sirop to produce Dominique Sirop for Daimaru, a high fashion prêt-à-porter (ready-to-wear) label.

== Locations (Japan) ==
- Shinsaibashi, Osaka - 7–1, Shinsaibashi Itchome, Chūō-ku. The main Daimaru department store, founded as Matsuya in 1726. Along Mido-suji. Daimaru's corporate headquarters were located nearby, at 4–10, Minamisenba Yonchome.
- Umeda, Osaka - 1-1, Umeda Sanchome, Kita-ku. Opened in 1983. At South Gate Building in the south of Osaka Station.
- Kyoto - 79, Shijo Takakura, Shimogyo-ku Kyoto. Opened in 1912. Along Shijō Dōri, north-east side of Karasuma Station.
  - Yamashina - 91, Takehana Takenokaido-cho, Yamashina-ku Kyoto. South of Yamashina Station.
- Kobe - 40, Akashicho, Chūō-ku, Kobe. Opened in 1927. Located in the south of Kyukyoryuchi-Daimarumae Station.
  - Shin-Nagata - Nagata-ku, Kobe
  - Suma - Suma-ku, Kobe
  - Ashiya - near JR West Ashiya Station
- Tokyo - 9–1, Marunouchi Itchome, Chiyoda-ku, inside the new North Tower of the Tokyo Station Twin Towers. Opened in 2007.
  - Urawa PARCO - Urawa-ku, Saitama
  - LaLaPort Yokohama - Tsuzuki-ku, Yokohama
- Sapporo - 4–7, Kitagojonishi, Chūō-ku, inside Sapporo Station. Opened in 2003.
- Stores operated by subsidiary companies in Fukuoka and Nagasaki (Hakata Daimaru K.K.), Shimonoseki, Tottori, Imabari, and Kōchi.

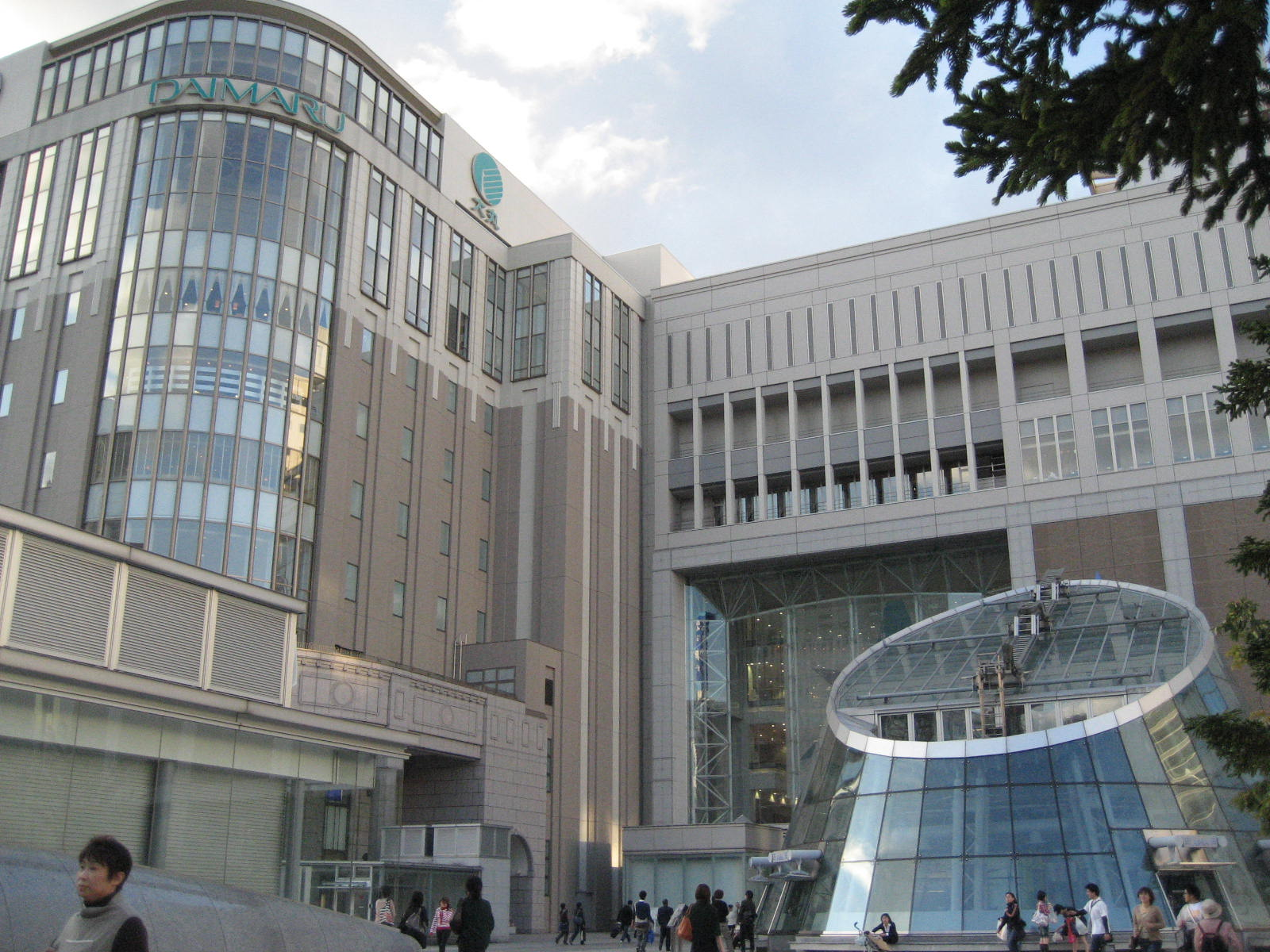
Daimaru at Sapporo Station, Hokkaido

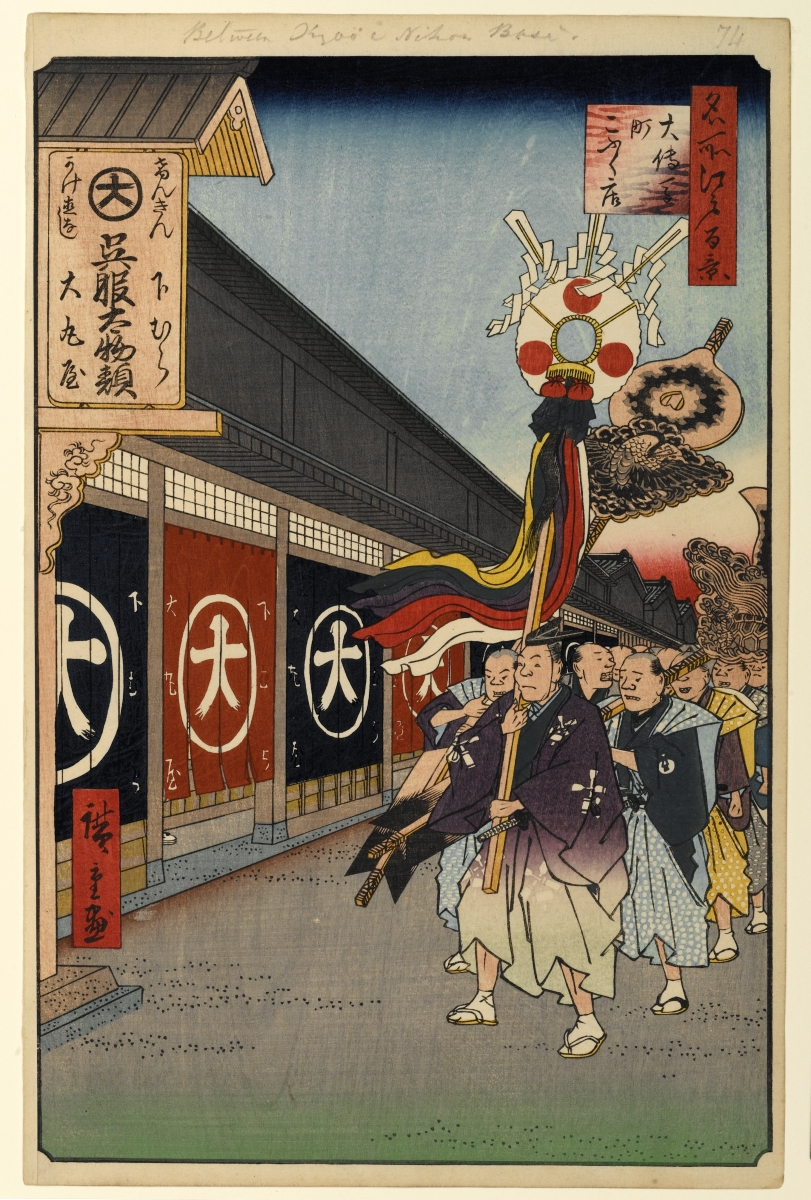
Hiroshige
