= Credit Saison =

Japanese financial services company

Credit Saison Co., Ltd.

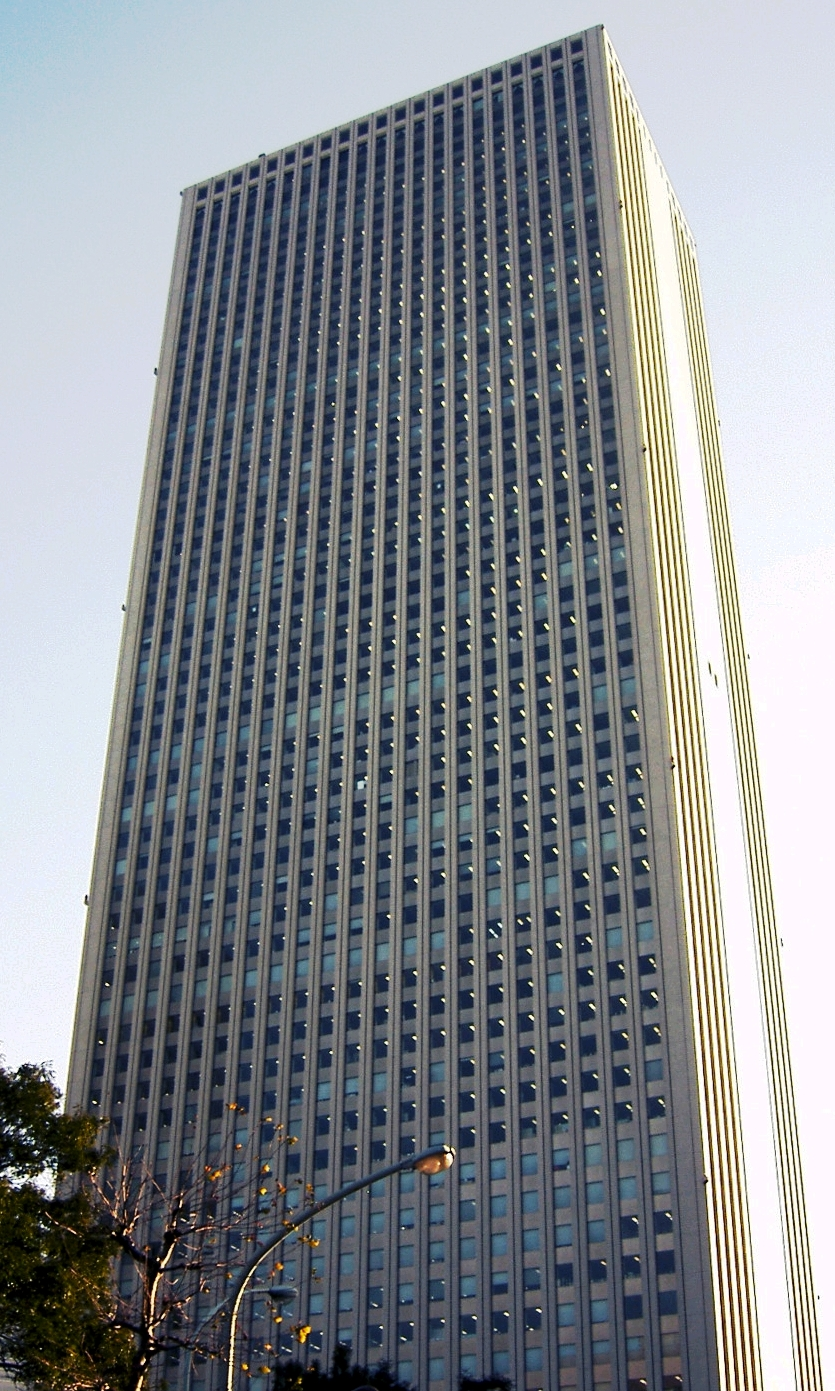
- Native name: 株式会社クレディセゾン
- Romanized name: Kabushiki gaisha Kuredi Sezon
- Type: Public KK
- Traded as: TYO: 8253
- Industry: Financial services
- Founded: 1951; 75 years ago in Tokyo, as Midoriya
- Founder: Torajiro Okamoto
- Headquarters: Sunshine 60, Tokyo, Japan
- Key people: Hiroshi Rinno, CEO
- Products: Credit card Insurance; Consumer finance
- Revenue: ▲¥274.666 billion JPY (2006)
- Net income: ▲¥42.220 billion JPY (2006)
- Owners: The Master Trust Bank of Japan (17.63%); Japan Trustee Services Bank (9.10%); Daiwa Securities Group (5.40%); Seven & I Holdings (1.08%); Mitsui Fudosan (0.81%); Takashimaya (0.65%); Dai Nippon Printing (0.20%); Seibu Holdings (0.18%)
- Number of employees: 3,239 (2019)
- Website: www.saisoncard.co.jp

Saison Card logo

Credit Saison Co., Ltd. (株式会社クレディセゾン, Kabushiki-gaisha Kuredi Sezon), commonly known as Credit Saison (クレディセゾン, Kuredi Sezon) or simply Saison (セゾン, Sezon), is a Japanese financial services company affiliated to Mizuho Financial Group. Founded in 1951, Credit Saison is the 3rd largest credit card issuer with over 20 million cardholders in Japan, behind JCB and Visa Japan.

== History ==
Credit Saison was founded in 1946 as Midoriya (緑屋) by Torajiro Okamoto. It was originally an operator of department stores specialized in installment selling.

Seibu Retailing Group, one of the (now former) subsidiaries of Seibu Railway, purchased Midoriya in 1976, attempting to add financial services to its portfolio of customer services. Midoriya's retailing division was transferred to Seibu Department Stores, and Midoriya itself was renamed Seibu Credit (西武クレジット, Seibu Kurejitto) retaining the credit management division.

Seibu Railway spun off Seibu Retailing in 1983 and Seibu Retailing was rebranded as Saison Group. Seibu Credit issued the first Saison Card in 1983. Seibu Credit finally rebranded itself as Credit Saison in 1989, standing as one of the Big Five core businesses of Saison Group.

Following the collapse of the Japanese asset price bubble in the 1990s, Saison Group fell into financial difficulties. The group's longtime president Seiji Tsutsumi was expelled from management in 1991. The group's creditors including Dai-Ichi Kangyo Bank and Industrial Bank of Japan (now part of Mizuho Financial) pressed the group to restructure its business. Credit Saison parted from other retailers of Saison Group, and formed an alliance with Mizuho in early 2000s.

== Saison Card ==
Credit Saison issues credit cards Saison Card (セゾンカード, Sezon Kādo) branded Visa, Mastercard, JCB, or American Express.

For their history, many cards are used by customers of former Seibu Railway group companies and Seibu Retailing Group companies including Seibu Railway, Seiyu, Parco, and MUJI. Sogo & Seibu was acquired by Seven & I and left the group, but Credit Saison and Seven & I founded a joint company and issued Saison Card. As a Mizuho financial group company, Mizuho Bank and many other banks issue cashcard/Saison Card joint card. Credi Saison also has issues for many other non-group companies.

Annual fees of Saison Card are free for normal cards, 1,575 yen to 3,150 yen for some cards, and 10,500 yen or more for gold or platinum cards.

== Volume of new contracts ==
As of March 30, 2006:

- Credit card-related shopping services: ¥ 2,527,808 million JPY
- Agency services: ¥ 747,998 million JPY
- Cash advances: ¥ 618,921 million JPY
- Specialty loans: ¥ 120,117 million JPY
- Leases: ¥ 90,011 million JPY
