= Seibu Department Stores =

Japanese department store

The Seibu Department Stores Ltd.

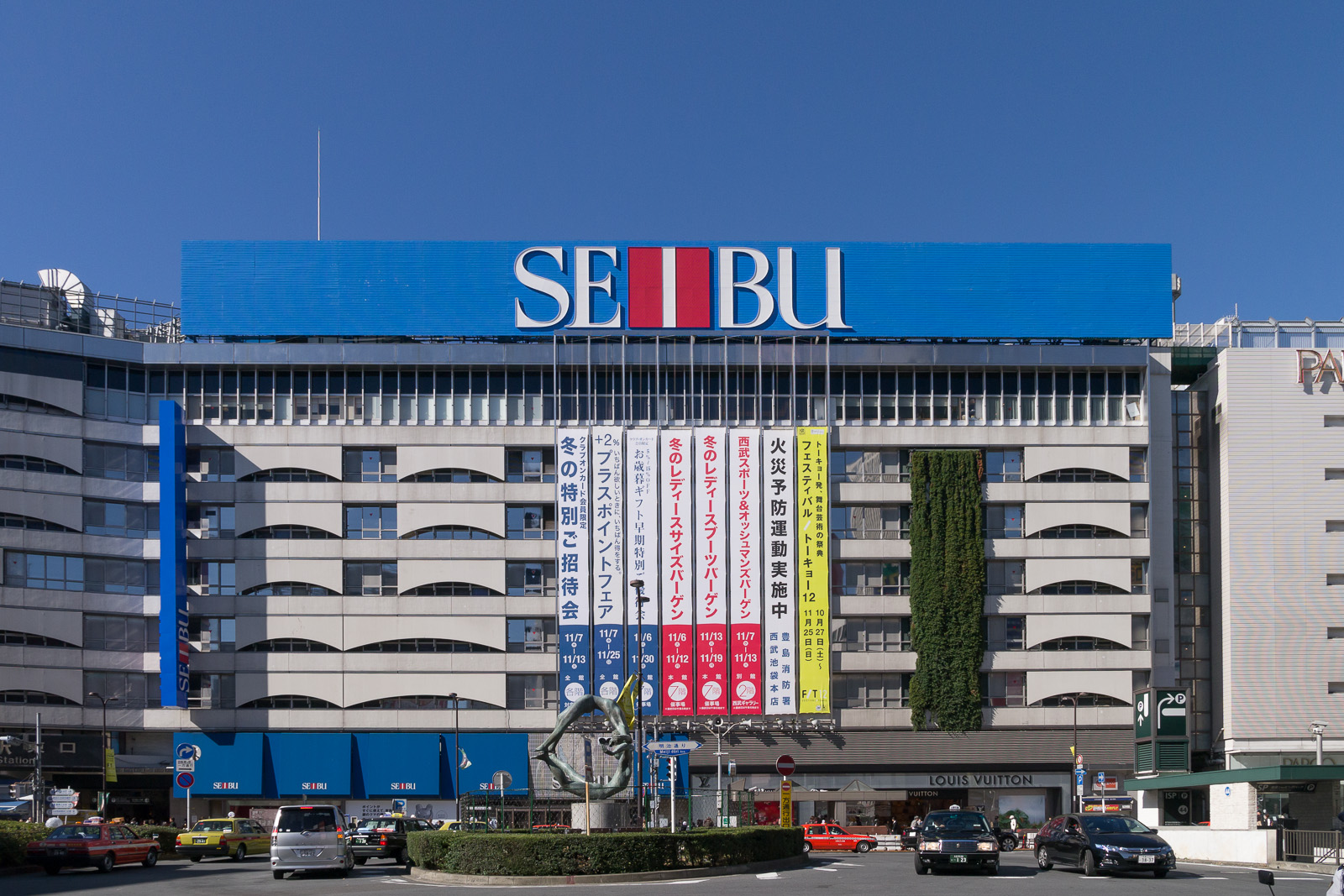
- Flagship store in Ikebukuro, Tokyo
- Type: Subsidiary
- Number of locations: 8 (2023)
- Area served: Japan; Indonesia; Malaysia
- Parent: Sogo & Seibu
- Website: sogo-seibu.jp

The Seibu Department Stores, Ltd. (株式会社西武百貨店, Kabushiki-gaisha Seibu Hyakkaten) is a Japanese department store. The first store to trade under the name opened its doors in 1949. Seibu is typical of Japanese department stores with a wide variety of stores doing business on several floors. The company is now a subsidiary of Sogo & Seibu Co., Ltd., owned by the U.S. investment fund Fortress Investment Group.

It was a member of the International Association of Department Stores from 1972 to 1990.

== Japan ==
The Seibu Department Stores flagship store is located in Ikebukuro. In Tokyo, there are stores in Shibuya and Ikebukuro. As of 2020, there are 8 stores in the whole country. In August 2020, Seibu will close its stores in Okazaki and Otsu while downsizing its stores in Akita and Fukui due to poor sales.

In addition to department stores, Seibu operates the specialty store Loft and The Garden/Shell Garden supermarket, both are also part of Seven & I Holdings Co., The Garden/Shell Garden supermarket was sold alongside Sogo & Seibu to the U.S. investment fund Fortress Investment Group in September 2023. Seibu previously operated Parco, now operated by J. Front Retailing, Muji (operating independently), and Seiyu Group, now owned by Walmart. Seibu, Parco, and Seiyu were previously part of the now-defunct Seibu Saison group, while Muji had been Seiyu's private brand.

=== Automobile imports ===
From 1960 until 1995, Seibu Department stores sold imported European and American cars. Competing with Yanase, Seibu sold Citroen, Saab, Chevrolet, Fiat, Ferrari, Holden, and Peugeot. It was originally called Western European Cars starting in 1963 until Seibu assumed operations as Seibu Motors in 1971. Successor company Shin Seibu Car Sales took over in 1995 and kept importing Citroëns until the company was dissolved in 2002.

== International ==
=== Indonesia ===
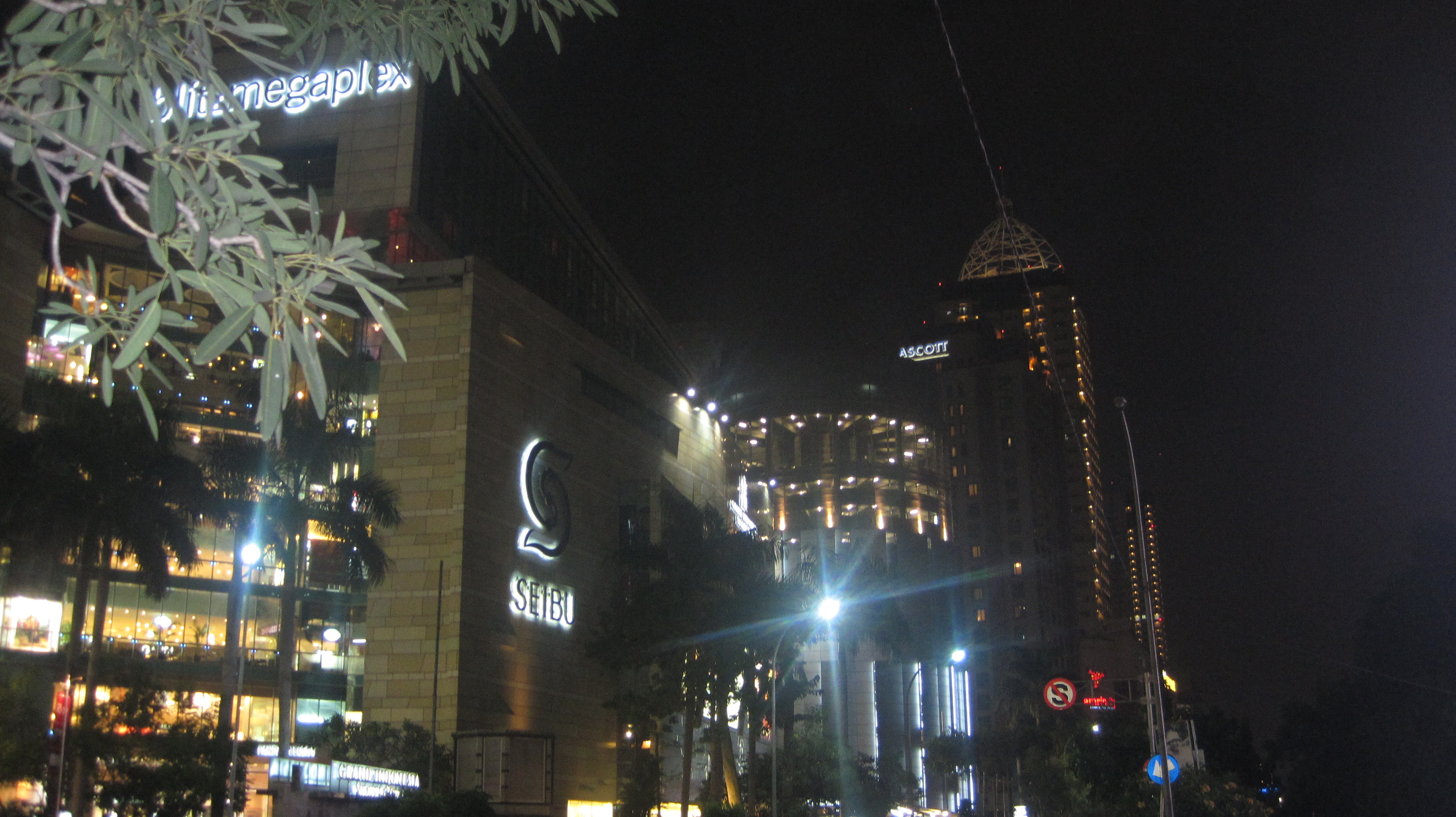
Seibu Department store Building in Grand Indonesia, Central Jakarta, Indonesia

==== First foray ====
Seibu's first foray in Indonesia as Jakarta Seibu was opened in 1995 in the Mega Pasaraya (now Pasaraya Blok M) complex, located near a busy terminal, Blok M, in Jakarta. It occupies four levels of the eight-story building, offering upscale shopping experience for the upper-class, with an atrium at the centre. The department store is operated by ALatief Corporation (PT. Pasaraya Nusakarya), a company that manages a major local department store, Pasaraya. The two department stores are adjacent and a pedestrian bridge connects the buildings. The department store, widely regarded as one of the most luxurious to ever open in the nation, had in-store boutiques of brands such as Yves Saint Laurent, Aigner, Versace, A. Testoni, Kenzo, Escada, Trussardi, and more - completed by beauty counters of Prada, Dior, etc. However, due to the 1997/8 recession and location, Jakarta Seibu failed to attract its targeted market along with numerous factors, and closed down in 1999.

==== Re-entry ====
Seibu re-entered the country on 9 May 2007, occupying four levels of the west mall area of Grand Indonesia Shopping Town. Similar to its predecessor, Seibu is once again segmented for the Indonesia's upper-mid class market, providing an array of upscale brands such as Calvin Klein, Tommy Hilfiger, Dolce & Gabbana Beauty's flagship store, and many more - along with accommodating services. Now operated by PT. Mitra Adiperkasa Tbk, who also operates the Indonesian Sogo (Seibu's sister department store chain) and Galeries Lafayette department store; the grand opening of store was held together with the mall on 20 May 2009, despite soft-opening the store two years earlier. It is the oldest continuous Seibu operating outside Japan despite the 8-year hiatus since the original Blok M store's closure in 1999.

A second branch of Seibu is opened in Pondok Indah Mall 3 on 17 December 2021. The 1-storey high store features an Apple premium reseller confirmed to open inside. However, Seibu downgraded its Pondok Indah Mall branch in 2025 after 4 years of operation, rebranding it as "Beauty Gallery by SEIBU" in order to refocus on Grand Indonesia branch.

=== Malaysia ===
The first Seibu store in Malaysia opened on 29 November 2023 at The Exchange TRX shopping mall in Kuala Lumpur.

Spanning 250,000 square feet (23,000 m^{2}), it features over 400-500 retail brands (100 of them are new brands entering Malaysia for the first time) across 4 levels and it is the first international luxury department store in Malaysia to house various mix of contemporary fashion brands and Japanese fashion brands that are new to Malaysia, largest collection of children's luxury fashion brands, and Malaysia's first Japanese food hall.

=== Former ===
==== Hong Kong ====
Seibu opened their first non-Japanese location in Hong Kong at its flagship store at the Mall at the Pacific Place on the former Victoria Barracks, but sold their operations to Dickson Concepts in 1996. The store operated until September 2013. Another location was at the Windsor House in East Point.

==== United States ====
In 1962, Seibu opened a branch at the corner of Wilshire and Fairfax in Los Angeles. It was the first Japanese department store in the mainland United States. Despite much publicity, the store attracted little more than curiosity and closed after only two years. The building was later occupied by Ohrbach's and is currently home to the Petersen Automotive Museum.

== See also ==
- Sogo
- Seven & I Holdings Co., Ltd.
