= Hamaya =

Decorative arrows sold for Japanese New Year

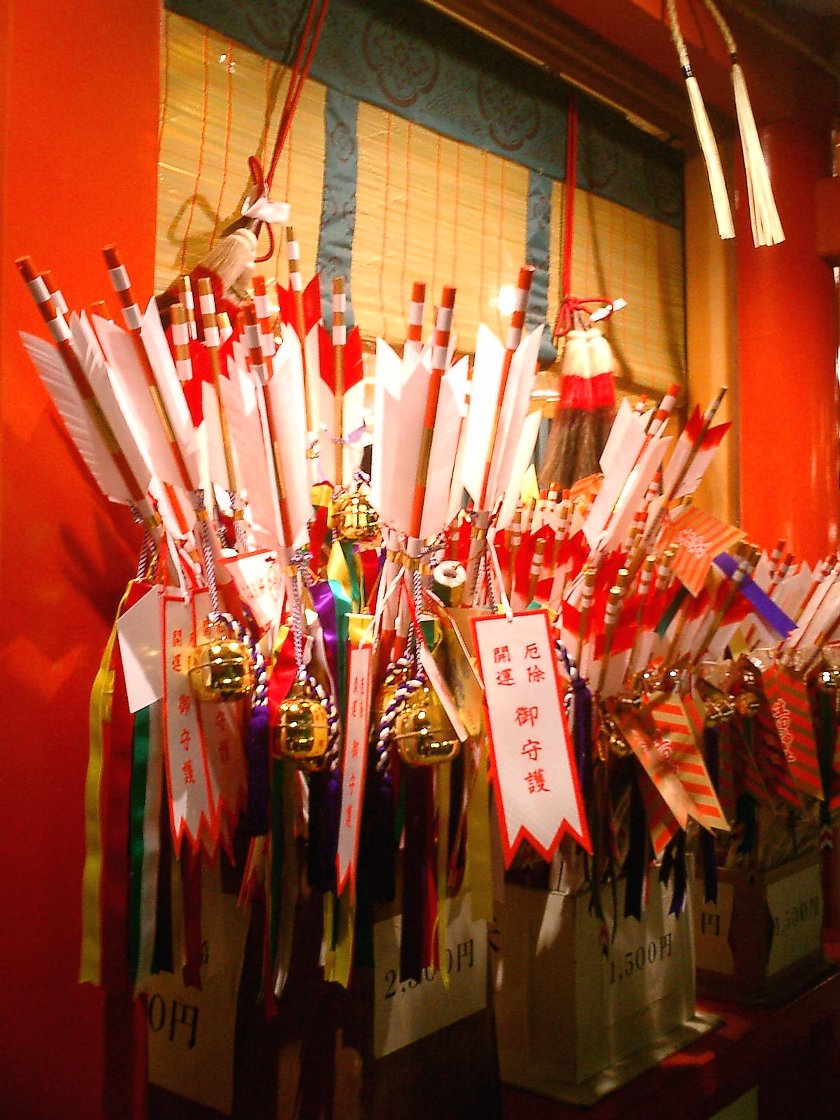
Ceremonial arrow used to drive off evil

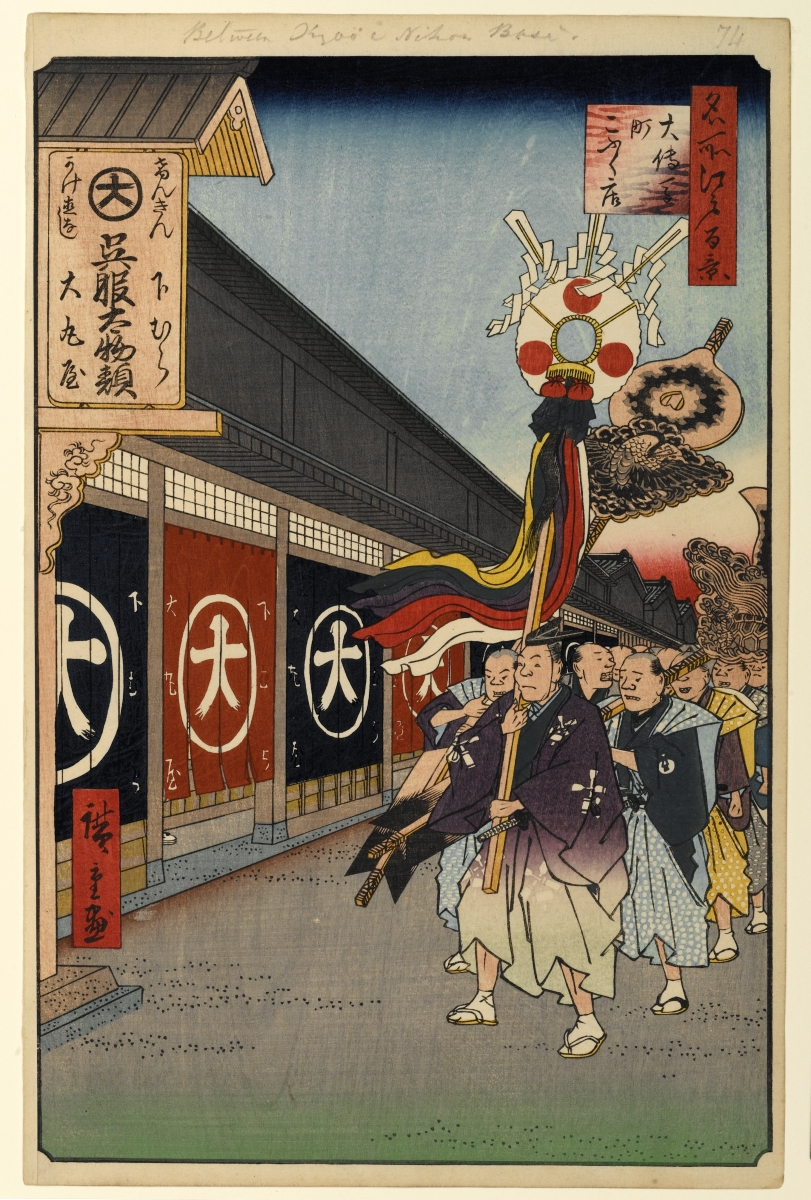
Nishiki-e depicting a ceremony for a newly constructed building in the Edo period. Behind the gohei staff held by the man in the front, two hamaya can be seen, used to ward off evil. (Hiroshige, One Hundred Famous Views of Edo, Ōdenmachō gofukuten)

Hamaya (Japanese: 破魔矢; lit. 'evil-destroying arrow') is a type of arrow given at Shinto shrines and Buddhist temples as a Japanese New Year's talisman or sacred tool. It is often paired with a bow called a hama yumi (破魔弓).

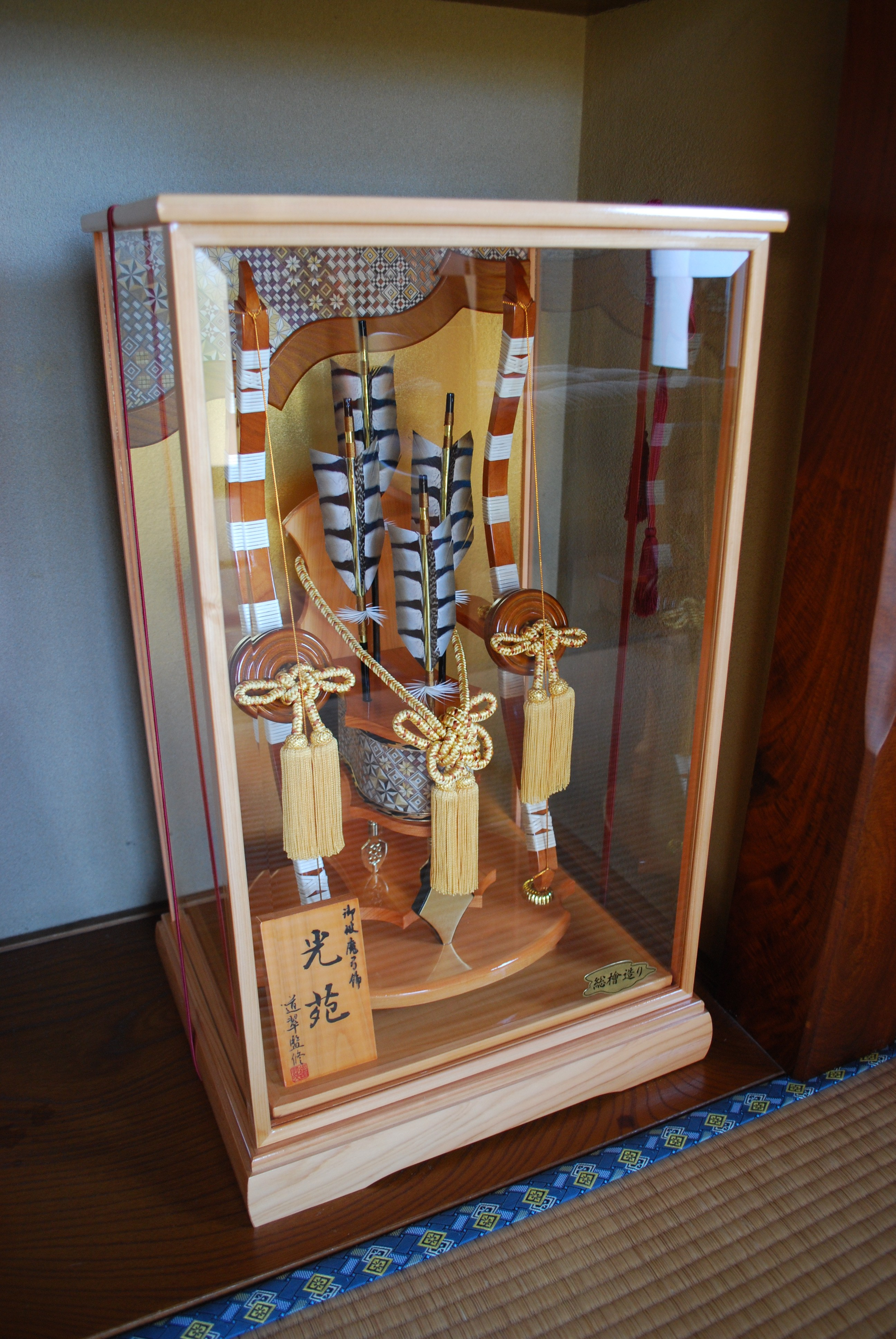
New Year's Day decoration for a family with a baby boy

In addition to this, hamaya and hama yumi are often set on top of roofs facing northeast or kimon (鬼門; the oni's gate; the direction from which oni are traditionally believed to come) as part of a ceremony to ward off evil from newly constructed buildings. It is also customary for relatives and acquaintances to give hamaya or hama yumi to newborns for their hatsuzekku (初節句; lit. first annual festival; typically Children's Day for a boy and Hinamatsuri for a girl).

Hamaya are said to have originated from the arrows used in an old event called Jarai (射礼), which was held on New Year's Day to test archery skills. Originally, the word hama referred to the kind of targets used in these events. The arrows used to shoot the targets were called hama-ya (hama arrows), and the bows were called hama-yumi (hama bows). Since the homophone hama (破魔) has the meaning of "destroying the evil power of a demon", these meanings merged, and the custom of giving bow-and-arrow toys to families with boys at New Year's was born. Later, they began to be given at Hatsumode as talismans, symbolizing "shooting down" evil and securing good luck for the year.

== Concept of hamaya ==
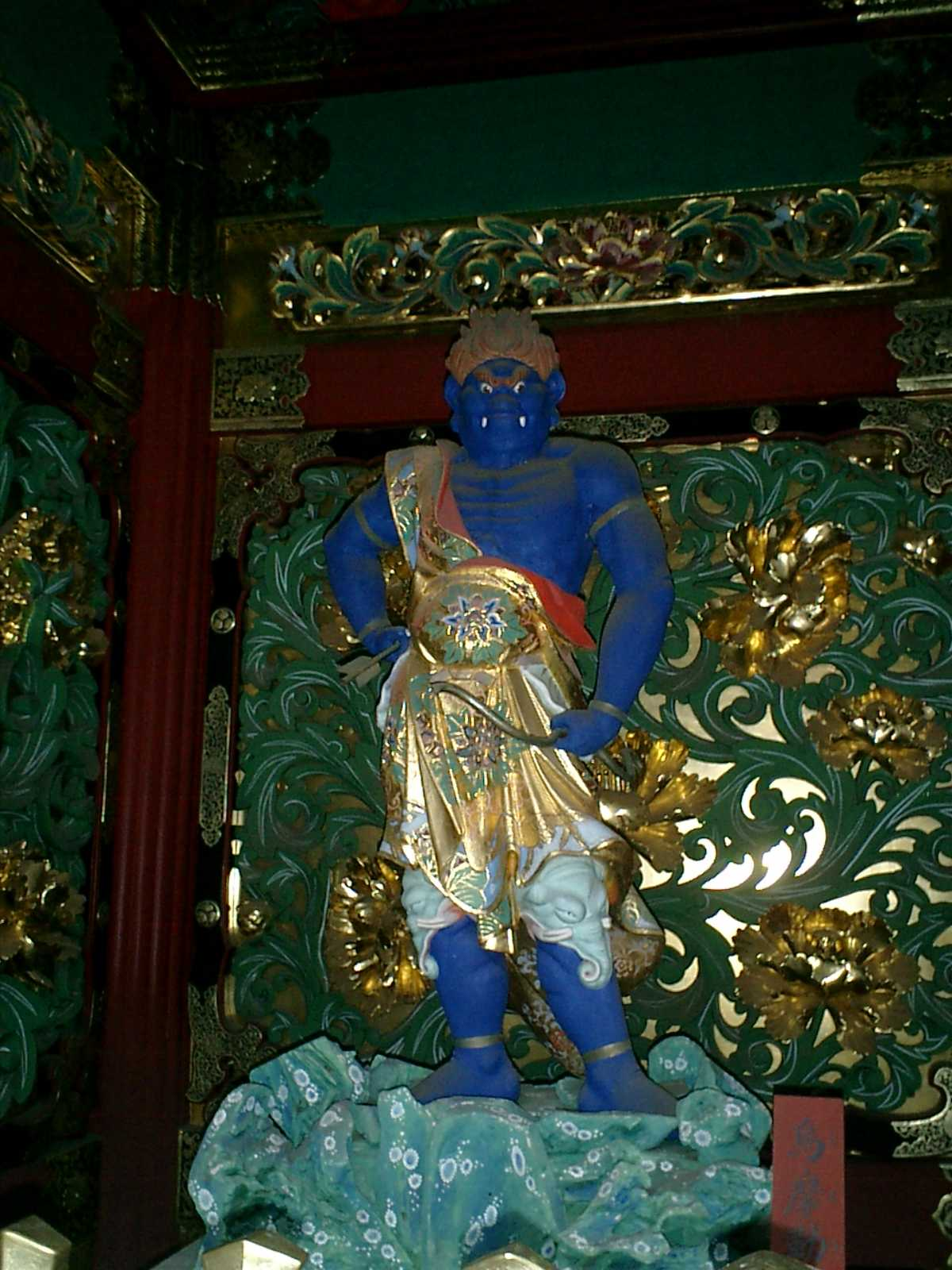
Umāraka

In Buddhism, there is a tradition that the golden bow and arrow held by Umāraka, one of the Four Yaksha who follow the Blue-Faced Vajra, is the origin of hamaya, and a hamaya named after this, ryūjin hamaya (龍神破魔矢; lit. dragon god hamaya), is sold at Rinnō-ji in Nikkō, where the Four Yaksha are enshrined.

In Japan, since ancient times, there has been little practice of casting spells, but there are many practices of breaking evil against spells. The reason why the tip of a hamaya is not sharp is because it is intended to destroy and purify evil spirits and intentions, rather than harm the actual physical people or objects towards which the hamaya are directed.

Although the hamaya are typically distributed on their own, they are technically only truly effective in breaking and purifying evil spirits when shot with the corresponding hama yumi. The reason for ordinary people to hold a hamaya on its own is that the hama yumi is considered to be held by an unseen god, Shinto priest, or some other person who has the ability to destroy evil, and the owner of the hamaya can thus shoot it by presenting the arrow to the evil spirit they want to destroy.

== Trademark ==
A trademark for "Hamaya", a small bow with a talisman and other items attached to it, had apparently been registered by an obscure Kanagawa Prefecture-based company called Hamaya Houseisho (破魔矢奉製所; sometimes with the 奉 misspelled as 寿) some time a few years before 2004. Because of this, NHK, which has a policy of avoiding brand names in their news broadcasts or publications, would systematically substitute the word hamaya for generic phrases such as mayoke no ya (魔除けの矢; lit. arrows for warding off evil) and mamori-ya (守り矢; lit. protecting arrows). However, since the word hamaya became more common, the company did not renew the trademark at some point, and NHK now uses hamaya in current articles.
