= Hands (store) =

Japanese departmental store chain

Hands Inc.

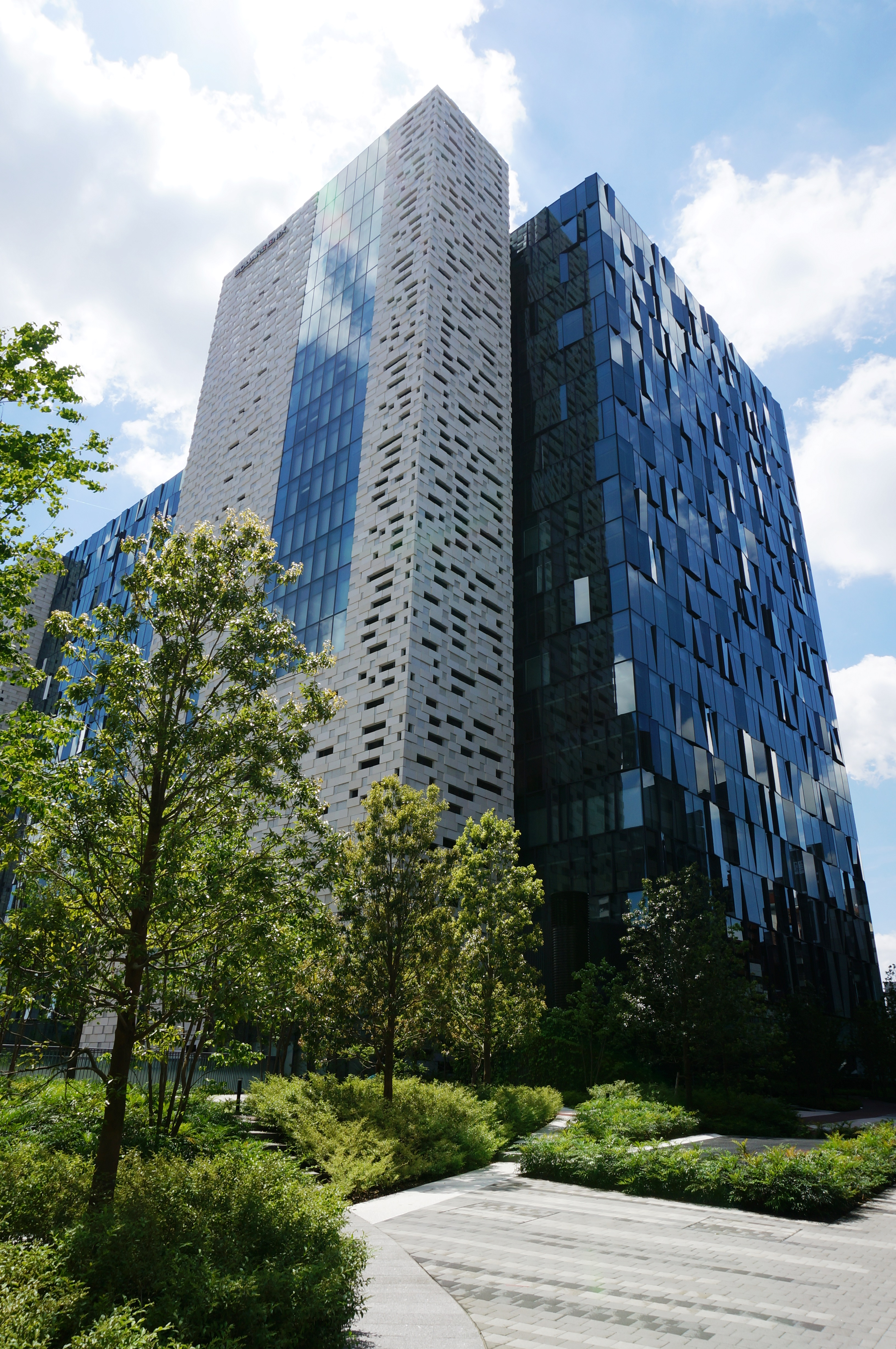
- Headquarters of Hands Inc. at Shinjuku Eastside Square in Shinjuku, Tokyo
- Native name: 株式会社ハンズ
- Type: Subsidiary (K.K.)
- Industry: Retail
- Founded: 18 August 1976
- Headquarters: Shinjuku, Tokyo, Japan
- Area served: Japan; Singapore; Taiwan
- Revenue: ▲¥55.5 billion (2022)
- Operating income: ▲¥3.9 billion (2022)
- Net income: ▲¥4.7 billion (2022)
- Total assets: ▲¥27.9 billion (2022)
- Parent: Cainz Corporation
- Subsidiaries: Hands Labo Co. Ltd. Tokyu Hands Singapore Pte. Ltd.
- Website: hands.net (in Japanese)

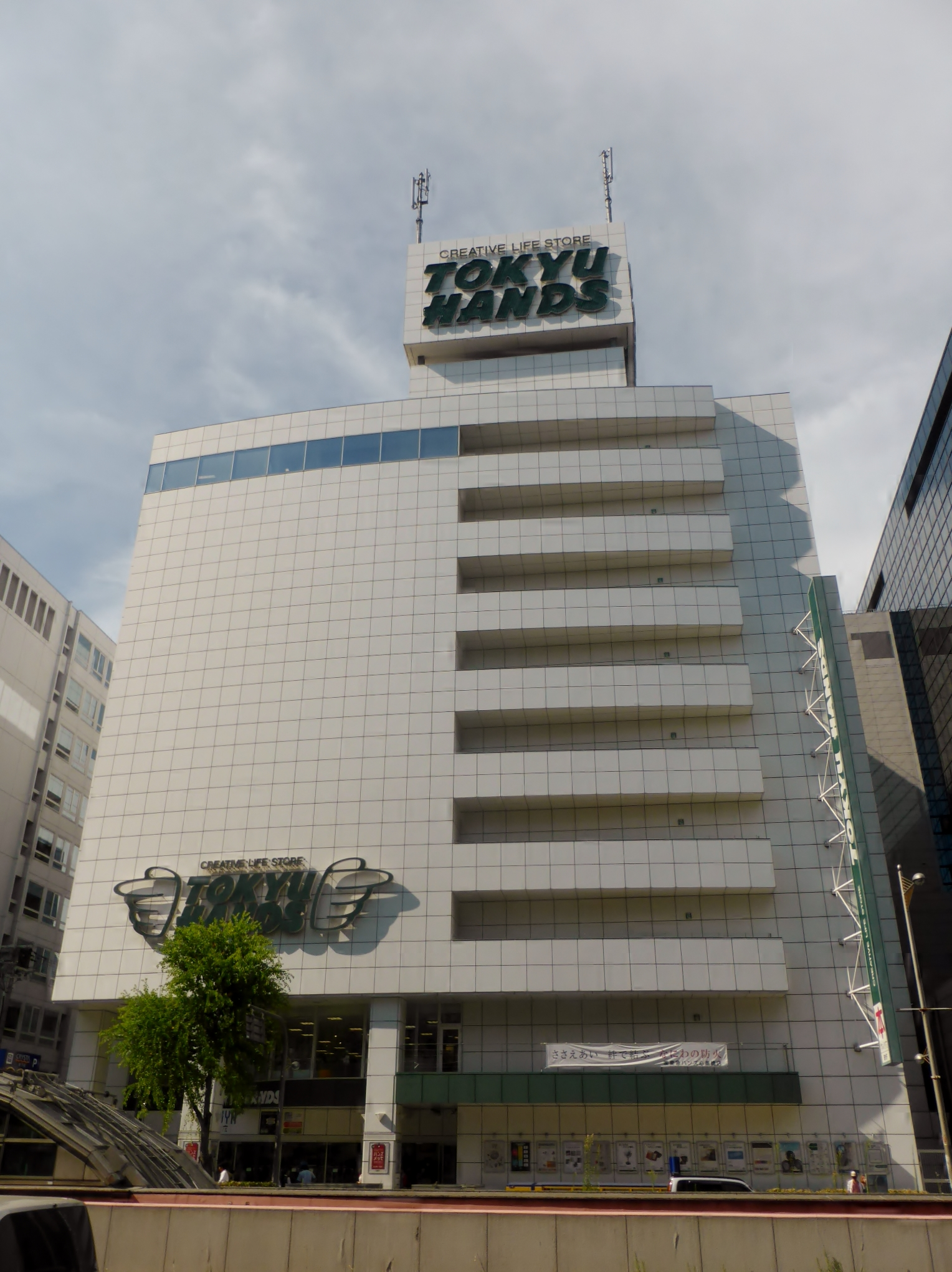
Tokyu Hands Shinsaibashi store in Chuo-ku, Osaka

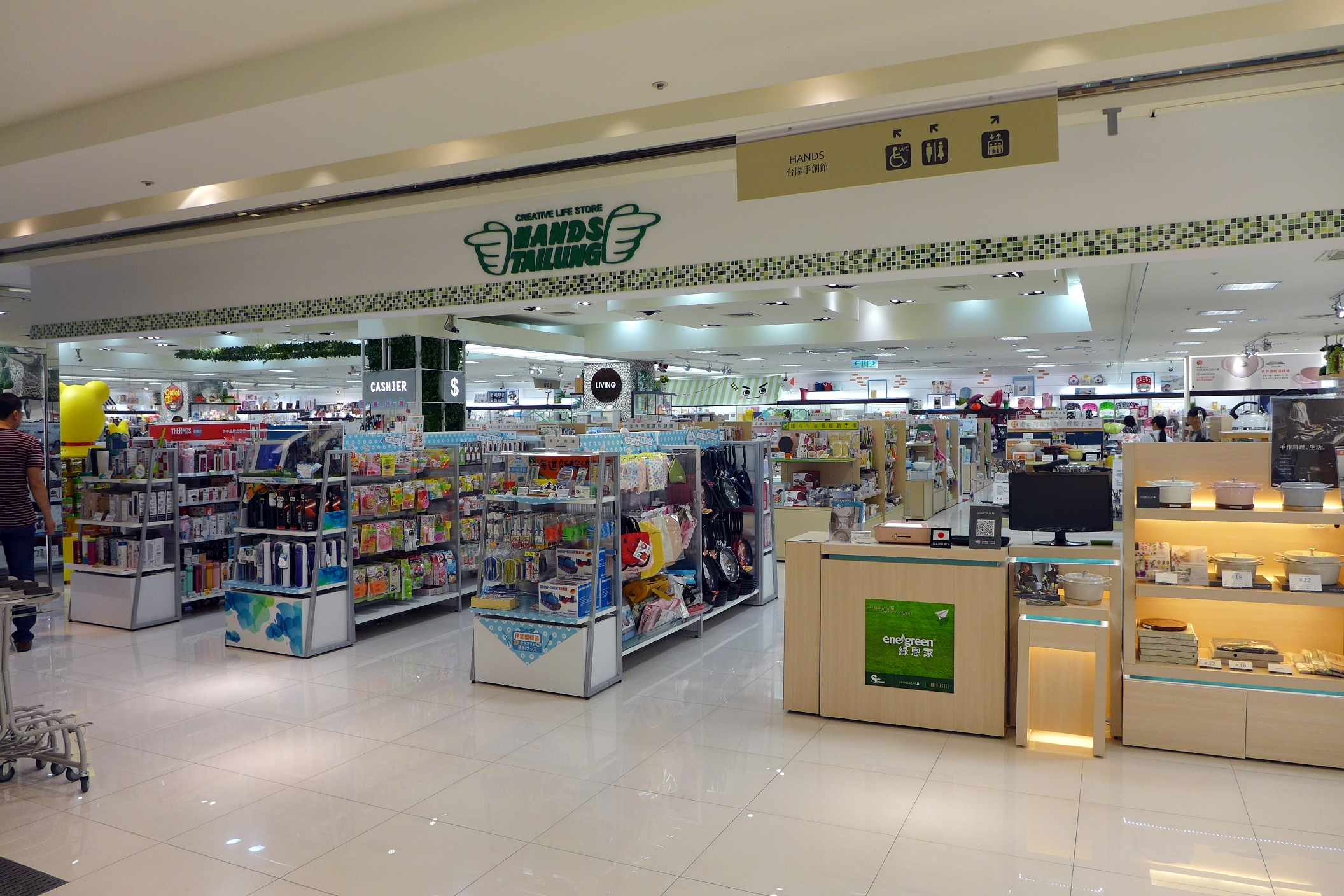
Tokyu Hands in Breeze Centre, Taipei

Hands Inc. (株式会社ハンズ, Kabushiki gaisha Hanzu), known as Hands (formerly Tokyu Hands), is a Japanese department store chain. Hands is now part of Cainz (itself a member of the Beisia Group). Tokyu Hands opened their first store in Shibuya, Tokyo in 1976 as a DIY (Do-It-Yourself) store, hence the logo with two hands, and the emphasis on crafts and materials for projects.

The name Tokyu Hands was in reference to its then parent company, the Tokyu Group keiretsu. Cainz acquired the brand in March 2022 and renamed the store Hands.

Today, Hands focuses on hobby, home improvement and lifestyle products. At the Shibuya flagship store, products include toys, games, novelty items, gift cards, gift wrap, costumes, bicycles, travel products (such as luggage and camping gear), hobby materials, household hardware, tools, do-it-yourself kits, pet supplies, office supplies and stationery; calligraphy, painting, drawing supplies, furniture, lighting, home appliances, and storage.

Most branches offer free workshops (in Japanese) and have demonstrations running on various floors during busy periods (weekends and holidays). There is a delivery service available for purchases that cannot be taken home on the day.

The Ikebukuro location featured a cat café called Nekobukuro, or "Cat's House", one of the first in the city to do so. For an additional admission fee, customers could visit with some 20 cats in the cafe. However, the Ikebukuro location underperformed as a whole and was closed on 31 October 2021.

The Shibuya location permanently closed on 15 November 2026, ending 48 years in operation.

== Stores ==
=== Japan ===
Hands operates 49 stores in Japan, including in:

- Tokyo

- Shibuya (closed November 2026)
- Shinjuku
- Tokyo Station
- Ginza

- Yokohama
- Chiba
- Sapporo
- Shizuoka
- Nagoya
- Kyoto
- Nara
- Osaka

- Umeda
- Namba
- Shinsaibashi

- Hiroshima
- Fukuoka
- Nagasaki
- Kumamoto
- Kagoshima
- Okinawa

- Naha
- Urasoe

=== Singapore ===
In Singapore, Hands opened its first store in Westgate in 2014, and currently operates three stores across the country:

- Orchard Central
- Suntec City
- Great World City

Former outlets:

- Westgate
- Jewel Changi Airport
- Paya Lebar Quarter

=== Taiwan ===
In 2000, an overseas branch of Tokyu Hands, named Hands Tailung (台隆手創館) opened in Taipei, Taiwan, in the Ximending area; as of 2017, Hands Tailung operates 15 stores in Taiwan.
