= Sogo & Seibu =

Holding company of Seibu and Sogo

Sogo & Seibu Co., Ltd.

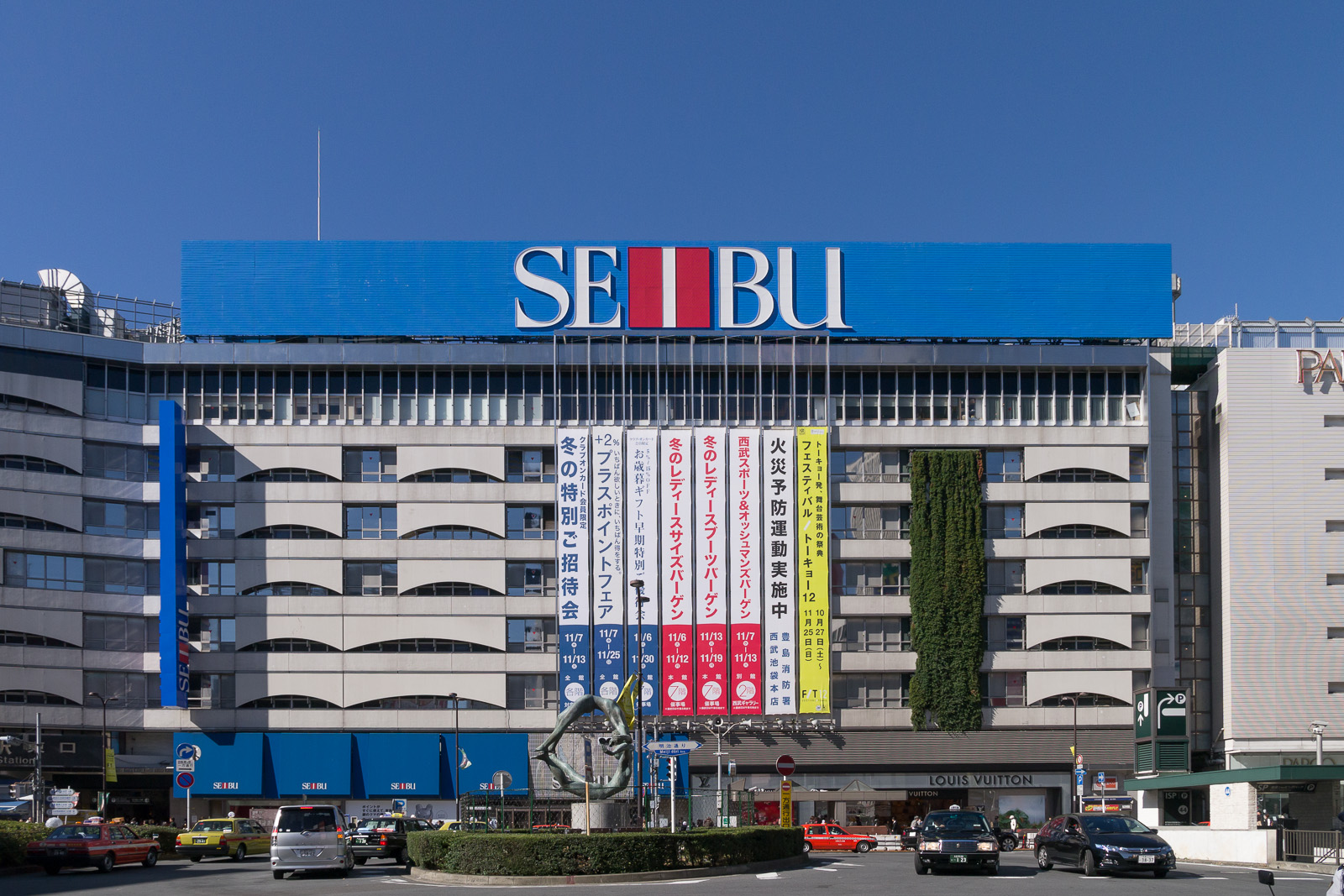
- Seibu Department Store in Ikebukuro, Tokyo
- Native name: 株式会社そごう・西武
- Type: Private
- Industry: Retail
- Founded: 2009 (from merger)
- Headquarters: Seibu Ikebukuro Main Store Book Library, 1-18-21 Minamiikebukuro, Toshima-ku, Tokyo
- Number of locations: 10 (2023)
- Key people: Liu Jin (CEO, Fortress Investment Group LLC); Hiroto Taguchi (president, Sogo-Seibu); David Sethia (vice president, Before Prada S.p.A)
- Services: Department stores
- Revenue: 16,760,005.66 US$(2022FY); 275,850,083.60 US$(2023FY)
- Net income: 707,121,288.75 US$(2022FY); 377,419,163.40 US$ (2023FY)
- Parent: Seven & I Holdings Co. (2009–2023); Fortress Investment Group (2023–present)
- Subsidiaries: Shell Garden Co., Ltd. (10%)
- Website: Official website

Sogo & Seibu Co., Ltd. (株式会社そごう・西武, Kabushiki-gaisha Sogou & Seibu) is a Japanese retail company that operates two major department store brands: Sogo, and Seibu. As of 2025, the company operates four Seibu-branded department stores, two Seibu-branded shopping centers, and four Sogo-branded department stores across Japan. In addition to its presence in Japan, the company also has stores in Hong Kong, Taiwan, and Southeast Asia, although the trademark rights in these regions are licensed to local companies, and Sogo & Seibu does not manage the stores directly.

== History ==
=== Early history ===
The origins of Sogo & Seibu trace back to 1830, when the company first opened as a kimono store in Osaka during the Edo period (Tenpo era). The company formally entered the department store business in 1918 under the name Sogo Kimono Co., Ltd.. With Japan's modernization, the company expanded its operations, growing to 28 stores at its peak.

Meanwhile, Seibu Department Store was established in 1930 under the name Musashino Department Store in Ikebukuro, Tokyo. In 1949, the store changed its name to Seibu Department Store. Over the years, Seibu played a key role in the formation of the Saison Group (Seibu Ryutsu Group), which later included well-known subsidiaries such as Parco (later becoming a J.Front Retailing subsidiary), Seiyu (later becoming a subsidiary of Walmart and even later bought out by Kohlberg Kravis Roberts in 2023), Family Mart (later becoming a subsidiary of Itochu), and Loft (later becoming a subsidiary of Seven & I Holdings). In addition to its core operations, the Saison Group included a variety of affiliate companies, such as Muji.

At the peak of its expansion, the Saison Group operated 32 retail stores across Japan, successfully broadening its market presence. However, as Japan's economy entered a prolonged deflationary phase in the late 1990s and early 2000s, the group's financial performance began to deteriorate. The economic downturn led to reduced consumer spending, which severely impacted profitability. The group's earlier aggressive expansion strategy, once seen as a key driver of growth, ultimately contributed to significant financial challenges. This included a sharp increase in non-performing loans, further straining the company's finances. Consequently, the group was forced to scale back its operations and reassess its business approach to navigate these economic difficulties.

=== Sogo and Seibu merger ===
The modern entity of Sogo & Seibu was formed on June 1, 2003, following a merger between Sogo Co., Ltd. and Seibu Department Store Co., Ltd., which created the holding company Millennium Retailing, Inc. The restructuring efforts were initiated to address the financial challenges facing the company. In 2005, Seven & I Holdings acquired the majority stake in Millennium Retailing, turning it into a subsidiary of Seven & I Holdings.

=== 2005: Subsidiary of Seven & i Holdings ===
On December 26, 2005, Seven & i Holdings received a stock transfer from Nomura Principal Finance, Millennium Retailing' largest shareholder, and became a subsidiary of Seven & i Holdings.

On September 1, 2009, the company reorganized and adopted the name "Sogo & Seibu," which included the management of both department stores. During this period, Sogo & Seibu became known for its technological innovations, including being the first department store in the world to sell humanoid robots with personalized faces (actroids), priced at $255,000 each. These robots were sold through their stores in Japan.

=== 2022: sale to Fortress Investment Group ===
In November 2022, Seven & I Holdings announced plans to sell Sogo & Seibu to Fortress Investment Group (FIG). The decision was driven by shareholder pressure, particularly from ValueAct Capital, urging Seven & I to focus on the expansion of 7-Eleven.

On August 31, 2023, it was reported that the company would be sold to Fortress Investment Group in a deal valued at ¥220 billion (approximately US$1.5 billion as of March 10, 2024). Following the acquisition, subsequent reports indicated that Fortress sold the acquired real estate to Yodobashi Holdings for ¥300 billion.

The announcement of the sale led to a strike by approximately 900 employees, culminating in the closure of the Seibu Ikebukuro flagship store on August 31. This strike marked the first major department store labor dispute in Japan since the 1960s. Despite the unrest, Seven & I Holdings Co. ultimately decided to retain the workers of Sogo & Seibu following the buyout.

The sale was officially completed on September 1, 2023, with a reported price of JP ¥85 million. Despite the sale, Fortress immediately sold the real estate assets to Yodobashi Holdings for JP ¥300 billion; Seibu and Sogo locations had depended on the presence of Yodobashi Camera within their department stores to drive sales. Subsequent reports revealed that the sale price of ¥85 million was based on a payment of ¥10.8 billion made by Sogo & Seibu to Seibu Holdings as a sales approval fee, which was later reimbursed by Seven & I Holdings. This arrangement occurred because the Seibu Group (Seibu Railway) owns half of the real estate at the Seibu Ikebukuro store and holds some of the trademark rights.

The turmoil surrounding the employees stemmed from concerns that the Seibu Ikebukuro store accounts for over one-third of Sogo & Seibu's profits. This led to fears about the future of the store and the company's survival. This issue was analyzed in publications such as Toyo Keizai Magazine.

=== Post-sale developments ===
Following the sale, Sogo & Seibu began the process of selling off additional properties, including the Sogo Chiba Junnukan, with surface rights and building management rights sold to Yodobashi Holdings on September 12, 2023 and the Sogo Kawaguchi store, which was sold to Mitsui Fudosan on September 12, 2023. The company also announced plans for a significant renovation of the Seibu Ikebukuro store, with a focus on luxury goods, cosmetics, and food, scheduled for completion in 2024.

Renovations of the Seibu Ikebukuro store were set to begin in August 2024, with plans to focus on luxury goods, cosmetics, and food, following the introduction of Yodobashi stores. As a result of the renovation of the Seibu Ikebukuro store, "The Garden Jiyugaoka Ikebukuro store," owned by Shell Garden, closed on January 31, 2024.

In a February 26, 2024 article in The Nihon Keizai Shimbun, the company announced that it would cease publishing monthly sales figures for its department stores, effective March 1, 2024.

== Other business ventures ==
In addition to its department stores, Sogo & Seibu operates several other businesses:

- Commercial Department: provides B2B services to corporations, schools, and public organizations.
- Yatsugatake Highland Lodge (八ヶ岳高原ロッジ): operates a range of hospitality services, including villa sales and management, and music hall operations in Minamimaki Village, Nagano Prefecture.
- Gottsu-o-bin: an e-commerce and catalog service specializing in high-quality ingredients.
- e.Department Store Marketing (e.デパートマーケティング): manages e-commerce sales and website operations and is involved with Seven Bank, a payment bank owned by Seven & I Holdings.

== See also ==
- Department stores in Japan
