= J. Front Retailing =

Japanese company

J. Front Retailing Co., Ltd. J.フロント リテイリング株式会社
- Company type: Public (K.K)
- Traded as: TYO: 3086
- Industry: Retail
- Founded: September 3, 2007; 18 years ago
- Headquarters: Chuo, Tokyo, Japan
- Number of employees: 5,589
- Subsidiaries: Daimaru Matsuzakaya Department Stores; Parco Co., Ltd.
- Website: j-front-retailing.com

J. Front Retailing Co., Ltd. (J.フロント リテイリング株式会社, J. Furonto Riteiringu Kabushiki Kaisha) is a major holding company in Japan, headquartered in Yaesu, Chūō, Tokyo.

It was established with a capitalization of 30 billion yen on September 3, 2007. It holds 100% of the stock in Daimaru Matsuzakaya Department Stores, which operates the department-store chains Daimaru and Matsuzakaya. It is traded on the Tokyo, Osaka, and Nagoya Stock Exchanges. J. Front's registered headquarters are in the Matsuzakaya Ginza store.

== Subsidiaries ==
Subsidiaries of J. Front include:

- Daimaru Matsuzakaya Department Stores (Department stores)
  - Peacock Stores (Supermarket)
  - The Daimaru Home Shopping
  - Daimaru Matsuzakaya Tomonokai
  - Daimaru COM Development
- Parco Co., Ltd.
- Daimaru Kogyo (Wholesale)
- Credit Business
  - JFR Card
- Other Businesses
  - J. Front Design & Construction
  - J. Front Foods
  - Dimples’
  - JFR Information Center
  - JFR Office Support
  - JFR Service
  - JFR Consulting
  - Consumer Product End-Use Research Institute
  - Angel Park
  - Central Park Building
