= Phi Sigma Alpha =

Puerto Rican social fraternity

- ΦΣΑ
- Founded: October 22, 1928; 98 years ago University of Puerto Rico, Rio Piedras Campus
- Type: Social
- Affiliation: CIPR; CIPFI
- Former affiliation: Union Latino Americana
- Status: Active
- Scope: International
- Motto: Caballeros Ante Todo
- Slogan: Omne Rarum Carum
- Member badge
- Colors: Azure, Gules, Or
- Flag
- Publication: Anuario Sigma
- Philanthropy: Fundación Sigma
- Chapters: 10 collegiate, 7 alumni
- Members: 4,376 + lifetime
- Headquarters: Calle Méjico corner of Calle Chile; Hato Rey, Puerto Rico; United States
- Website: phisigmaalpha.org

Phi Sigma Alpha (ΦΣΑ), commonly known as La Sigma, is a Puerto Rican fraternity originally established as the Sigma Delta Alpha Fraternity (Sociedad de Amigos) on October 22, 1928, at the University of Puerto Rico by twelve students and a professor. Phi Sigma Alpha can trace its roots back to 1898 to the Union Hispano Americana, as well as to the first ever Greek letter Hispanic-oriented fraternity, Sigma Iota, established in 1912. By 1998 there were over 4,376 members.

== History ==
=== Origins 1898–1928 ===
Monument of Sigma Iota's birthplace on the former LSU Campus

Union Hispano Americana emblem

Phi Sigma Alpha traces its origins to several organizations including Phi Lambda Alpha. Phi Lambda Alpha fraternity was founded at the University of California, Berkeley, in 1919. The fraternity was the result of a merger of three societies: Pi Delta Phi Fraternity at Massachusetts Institute of Technology (MIT), founded in 1916; Phi Lambda Alpha Fraternity, founded in 1919 at the University of California, Berkeley; and the Unión Hispano Americana, founded in 1898, at Rensselaer Polytechnic Institute, Troy, New York. This last one was the first Latin-American student society formed in the USA; A group of Latin American students organized the Unión Hispano Americana (UHA) as a cultural and intellectual secret society based on the ideology of Pan-Americanism.

After ΦΛΑ was organized, other societies joined it: the Club Latino-Americano, founded in 1919 at Colorado School of Mines; the Federación Latino-Americana, founded in 1926 at Columbia University and which joined in 1928; the "Club Hispania" of Cornell University, founded in 1929, and which joined in 1931; the Club Hispano-Americano of Tri-State College in Angola, Indiana, founded in 1921, and which joined in 1929, and the Alfa Tenoxtitlan Militant chapter (founded in 1929) whose members had come from the former ΦΛΑ society in Mexico City, Mexico.

Sigma Iota fraternity was founded in Baton Rouge, Louisiana, on March 2, 1912, previously known as the Sociedad Hispano Americana, which was founded in the University of Louisiana in 1904. Between 1912 and 1925, Sigma Iota expanded rapidly in the United States, South America, and Europe. As a result of this, Sigma Iota became the first international Latin American-based fraternity.

Sigma Iota and Phi Lambda Alpha joined and became Phi Iota Alpha in 1931. In 1932, Phi Iota Alpha reorganized and formed the Union Latino Americana (ULA) as its overall governing body, dividing their member fraternities in Latin America into zones according to the country they represented.

=== The Sigma 1928–1934 ===
Sigma Delta Alpha fraternity was established by twelve students and a professor on October 22, 1928, at the University of Puerto Rico at the Glorieta Fabián. The founding members included:

Sigma founders and two of the first members to join

- Gilberto Alemar
- Santos Primo Amadeo Semidey (professor of law)
- Adalberto Carrasquillo
- Juan Figueroa Rivera
- Fernando Jiménez
- Charles Henry Juliá Barreras
- José Laracuente
- Diego Guerrero Noble
- Samuel L. Rodríguez
- Victor M. Sánchez
- Hugo David Storer Tavarez
- Gilberto del Valle
- Joaquin Velilla

Originally the name Kappa Delta Alpha was considered but it was quickly changed to Sigma Delta Alpha. By December 5, 1928, they established their chapter house where they began holding meetings.

For many years, Sigma Delta Alpha enjoyed a certain amount of notoriety not enjoyed by other student organizations at the university. Its membership included four of the most important student leadership positions at the university: the Yearbook editor, the senior class president, the Athletic Society president, and the ROTC Battalion Commander. Every activity sponsored by the school administration was consulted with the Sigma Delta Alpha chapter president at the university in Río Piedras. In 1929, the Beta chapter at the Colegio de Mayagüez (University of Puerto Rico at Mayagüez) was established; thus the original chapter came to be known as Alpha chapter.

=== The union 1934–1939 ===
Phi Sigma Alpha had its first reorganization with the merger between the Alpha Boriquen Militant chapter of Phi Iota Alpha and Sigma Delta Alpha of the University of Puerto Rico in 1934. The Puerto Rican zone formed when the Alpha Boriquen Militant Chapter was founded in San Juan, Puerto Rico, on March 4, 1934, by former members of Phi Iota Alpha.

Under the conditions stated above, a movement came about to unite Sigma Delta Alpha with the Alpha Boriquen Militant Chapter of Phi Iota Alpha. It was not an easy task since many of the Sigma Delta Alpha members did not want the change or to alter their history. But the decision was made and thus the Phi Sigma Alpha Zone of the Union Latino Americana came to be. A Zone Directive was created and a constitution was drafted, since there was no central body to control the fraternity.

By 1937, the ULA had several well-established and functional zones including:

- Phi Iota Alpha in the United States
- Phi Kappa Alpha in Cuba
- Phi Sigma Alpha in Puerto Rico
- Phi Tau Alpha in Mexico

ULA held its last Convention from January 7 to 8, 1938. Delegates from the United States, Cuba, and the Puerto Rico zones were present. At the convention, agreement could not be reached over the ideals of the fraternity. After the convention, each zone considered the matter independently. The USA zone decided that the ideals of the ULA ought to be Pan-Americanism (the unification of Latin America by a system of confederacy) and led its members towards a position of pro-independence as it related to Puerto Rico, while the Cuban zone did not reach a decision on their own and ultimately decide to go along with the ideals conceptualized by the USA zone.

The Puerto Rico zone rejected this decision because it considered the introduction of political issues to be detrimental to the fraternity. Thus on September 25, 1938, the Phi Sigma Alpha Zone withdrew from the Union Latino Americana. The ULA dissolved shortly after.

=== The era of growth 1939–1964 ===
Like the members of the Sigma, a majority of the members (including two undergraduates, Ramon Garcia and Antonio A. Verrissimo) of the chapter of Phi Iota Alpha of the University of Louisiana disillusioned with the character given to their brotherhood, withdrew from the fraternity and formed Sigma Iota Alpha in April 1939. Sigma Iota Alpha was a fraternity composed of Latin students of that university. This new fraternity was received with distrust by the other Latin fraternal organizations at the university. Since Phi Sigma Alpha was organized in Puerto Rico with ideals similar to those of the Sigma Iota Alpha in Louisiana, negotiations were started to merge the two fraternities. This was decided in a convention celebrated on September 10, 1939, at the University of Puerto Rico, organizing themselves as Fraternidad Sigma (Sigma Fraternity) with two ramifications: Phi Sigma Alpha Zone in Puerto Rico and Sigma Iota Alpha Zone in Louisiana. Later the USA Zone's name was changed to Phi Sigma Beta Zone and came to include other universities in north Louisiana.

The Phi Sigma Alpha Zone was organized by a board of directors of the zone, the Militant chapter Alpha Boriquén of San Juan, and two university chapters, one at U.P.R.-Río Piedras and another one at the U.P.R.-Mayagüez (then known as the Colegio de Agricultura y Artes Mecanicas de Mayagüez (CAAM)). Years later, the militant chapters of Ponce and Mayagüez were also organized.

The Sigma Iota Alpha Zone (Phi Sigma Beta) consisted of the Alpha chapter at the University of Louisiana. In 1941, the Beta chapter in Baltimore, Maryland, was organized. It was composed of students from various nearby universities, including Georgetown, University of Maryland, University of Baltimore, Johns Hopkins, and George Washington University. In November 1957, together with Phi Eta Mu and Phi Eta Mu. they founded a Greek letter umbrella organization Concilio Interfraternitario de Puerto Rico.

With time it became increasingly more difficult to sustain a fully functional zone in the United States, while pretending it worked as well as zone one in Puerto Rico. A reformist movement arose abroad and culminated in 1964 with the establishment of the Phi Sigma Alpha Fraternity composed of active and militant chapters in Puerto Rico, the United States, and abroad. Therefore, the model based on zones was abolished and eliminated.

=== The era of progress and adaptations (1964) ===
Puerto Rico felt the economic boom of the post-Second World War years, and this boom was also evident in its universities. Puerto Rican youth registered in Puerto Rican universities in record numbers, and the Fraternity, which acted as the supplier of the union between its young people and an escape from arduous studies, also offered student housing. During the next two decades, Sigma enjoyed extensive enrollment in the original chapters as well as the new ones that were beginning to develop. While the baby boom effect declined dramatically in the late 1970s /early 1980s, it resurged at the end of the 1980s and continued until the beginning of the 1990s.

"Un Sigma es ante todo un caballero"

— Phi Sigma Alpha Creed

The 1990s brought an era of mandated accountability of fraternities, partly resulting from the deaths of two young cadets of the quasi-fraternal group the "Panthers" of the ROTC in the CAAM, and also a damages lawsuit perpetrated against another island fraternity. This brought forth a law, which can be found in Article 125 of the New Puerto Rico Penal Code, to control the initiation processes or "hazing" and to protect candidates. The Sigma Brotherhood, which since 1959 had prohibited in its processes the use of the "Pledge Paddle", achieved another "first" from its prohibition of acts against the physical and mental dignity of the neophyte even before Article 125 was enacted.

The Sigma has continued its emphasis throughout the years on the areas of community and social work by its active and militant chapters which regularly take part in blood drives and fund-raising activities for different organizations. The "Beca Sigma" (Sigma Scholarship) program has been re-established and promises to offer young Puerto Ricans of scarce resources the opportunity to receive a university education.

== Symbols and traditions ==
The fraternity's colors are Azure, Gules, and Or. Its motto is Caballeros Ante Todo. Brothers in active chapters are called activos and alumni Brothers are called militantes. Brothers also call each other Sigmas.

== Governance ==
The fraternity's highest administrative body is the Junta de Directores or Board of Directors. This body is composed of two groups. The first is the Comité Ejecutivo Central (Central Executive Committee) which includes the fraternity president, vice president, and others. The second group is composed of the regional presidents, and the presidents and secretaries of all the fraternity chapters, alumni, and active members. All members have an equal vote. The board of directors meets several times a year, as convened by the fraternity president. As of 2010, there were six regions, with the ones in Puerto Rico named after their main city: San Juan Region, Guayama Region, Ponce Region, Arecibo Region, Mayagüez Region, and the USA Region, based in Florida.

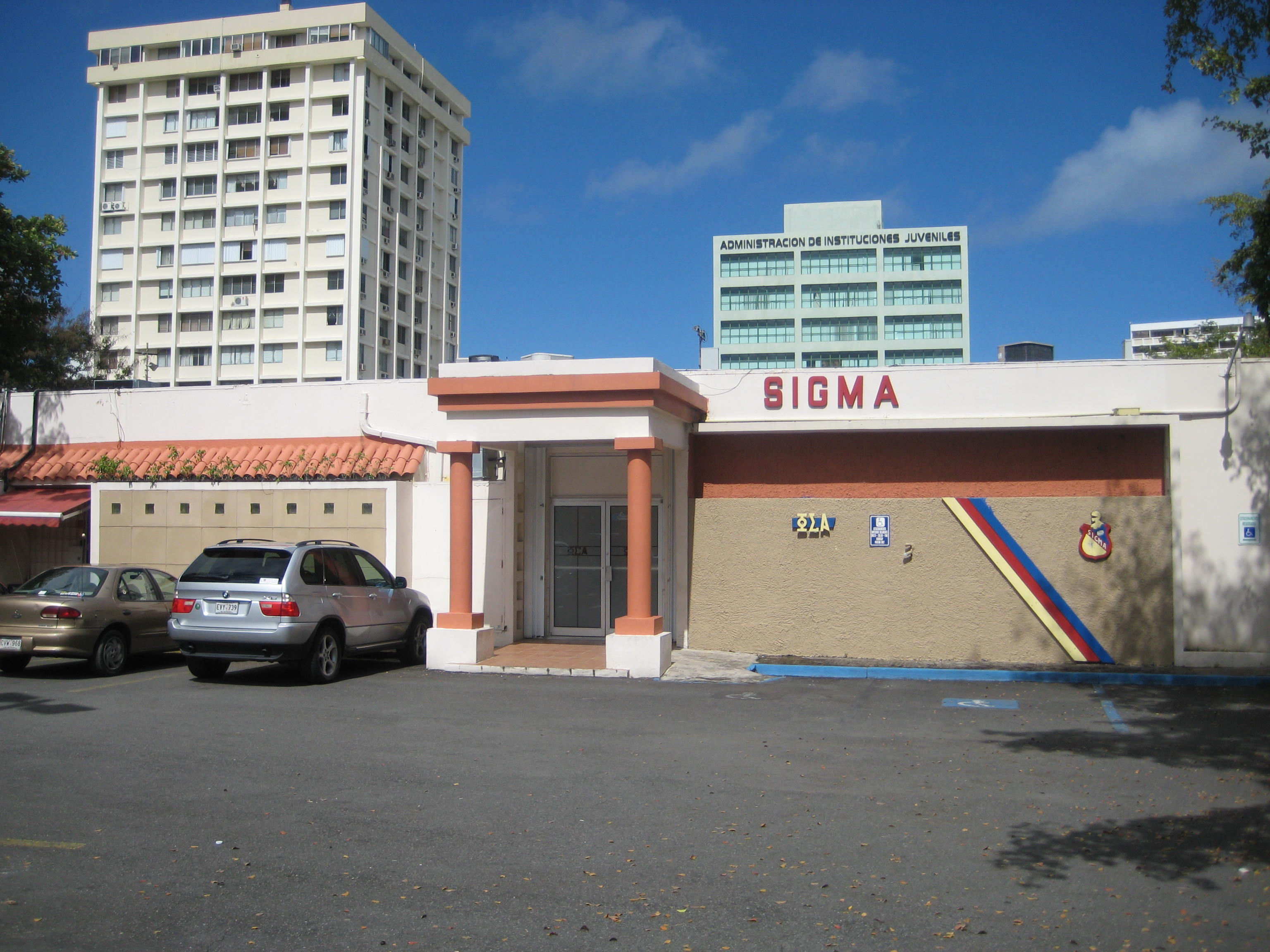
Casa Club Sigma's main entrance in Hato Rey

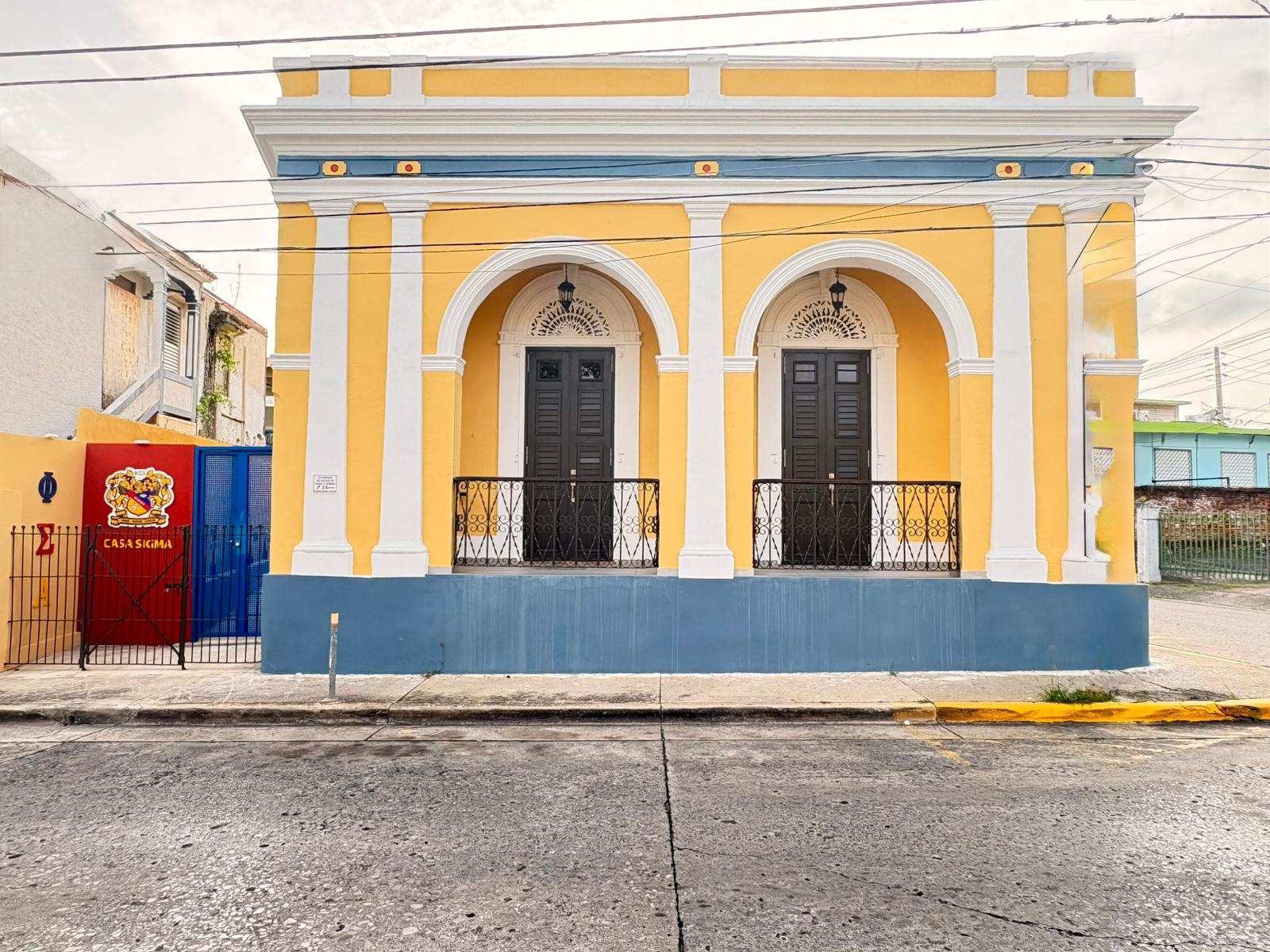
Casa Sigma Mayagüez

== Club houses ==
Through its history the fraternity did have multiple chapter houses for most of its chapters. Nevertheless the practice became less and less common by the late 1990s in the Puerto Rico fraternity movement. Since then Phi Sigma Alpha has focused on nonresidential club houses.

Phi Sigma Alpha's main headquarters are located at the corner of Calle Mejico and Calle Chile in Hato Rey, Puerto Rico. The offices are located in the Alpha Boriquen chapter's clubhouse, known as Casa Club Sigma. Its restaurant has operated uninterrupted since 1968. Its activity halls are rented out for meetings and events held by many organizations. The clubhouse has two main activity halls and two smaller ones, which can all be opened up to create one big room, or used individually.

In 2025 a club house in Mayagüez was established after renovating the historic Tienda-Almacén Siempreviva.

== Philanthropy ==
Sigma Foundation logo

The Fundación Sigma (Sigma Foundation) is a nonprofit organization, established to offer Puerto Rican youth of limited resources and those of outstanding academic records the opportunity to cover part of their university expenses. Through different fraternity activities, carried out to raise funds, the organization seeks to be fiscally responsible as the basis to fulfill its philanthropic goals.

The fraternity collaborates and contributes to different organizations, mainly to the Fondita de Jesus, the American Red Cross, American Cancer Society and Centro Espibi in Mayagüez. Various golf tournaments are held to raise funds for charities. The Beta Boriquen chapter coordinates one such tournament with the Mayagüez Rotary Club. The fraternity raised funds for Da Vida Caminando con Raymond (Walk-A-Thon) during the years the event was active; its members raised $25,000 in 2023. The fraternity once again donated to the "Da Vida Walk-A-Thon" in 2025, having donated in all the years of the event over $100,000.00.

Since 2019, the fraternity has held consciousness raising campaign against violence against women, including a campaign in Caribbean Cinemas in March 2024. The fraternity donated $80,000.00 to the feminist nonprofit Proyecto Matria in September 24, 2024. In March 2026, the fraternity participated, alongside Mu Alpha Phi, in a charitable fashion event benefiting Casa Protegida Julia de Burgos, focused on inclusion and social support initiatives.

== Chapters ==
The fraternity has both collegiate and alumni chapters. The collegiate chapters are named by a Greek letter depending on their order of founding, followed by the word activo (active). The alumni chapters follow the same nomenclature, with the suffix boriquén.

=== Collegiate chapters ===
Following is an incomplete list of the fraternity's university chapters, with active chapters indicated in bold and inactive chapters in italics.

Chapter	Institution	Location	Status	Ref.
**Alfa-Omega Activo**	University of Puerto Rico, Río Piedras Campus	San Juan, Puerto Rico	Active	(Note: ΑΩ-Activo Chapter was originally two chapters located in SJ, PR; Α-Activo at UPR Río Piedras and Ω-Activo at Inter American U at SJ; the chapters merged.)
**Beta Activo**	University of Puerto Rico at Mayagüez	Mayagüez, Puerto Rico	Active	
**Gamma Activo**	Pontifical Catholic University of Puerto Rico	Ponce, Puerto Rico	Active	
**Delta Activo**	Interamerican University of Puerto Rico	San Germán, Puerto Rico	Active	
**Epsilon Activo**	Polytechnic University of Puerto Rico	San Juan, Puerto Rico	Active	(Note: Epsilon Activo Chapter was originally at UPR, Medical Sciences Campus, but after years of inactivity, it was re-opened in 2007 at the Polytechnic University of Puerto Rico.)
**Zeta Activo**	University of Puerto Rico at Arecibo	Arecibo, Puerto Rico	Active	
**Omicrón Activo**	University of Puerto Rico at Aguadilla	Aguadilla, Puerto Rico	Active	
**Epsilon Columbia Activo**		Miami, Florida	Active	
**Omega Columbia Activo**		Orlando, Florida	Active	
**Alfa Azteca Activo**	Universidad Autónoma de Guadalajara	Guadalajara, Mexico	Active	
Alpha of Sigma Iota Alpha Zone	Louisiana State University	Baton Rouge, Louisiana	Inactive	
Beta Caribe of Sigma Iota Alpha Zone		Washington, DC	Inactive	

=== Alumni chapters ===
Following is a list of Phi Sigma Alpha alumni chapters with active chapters in bold and inactive chapters in italics.

Chapter	Location	Status	References
Alfa Boriquén	San Juan, Puerto Rico	Active	
Beta Boriquén	Mayagüez, Puerto Rico	Active	
Delta Boriquén	Arecibo, Puerto Rico	Active	
Épsilon Boriquén	Guayama, Puerto Rico	Active	
Gamma Boriquen	Ponce, Puerto Rico	Active	
Kappa Boriquén	Dorado, Puerto Rico	Active	
Omicrón Boriquén	Aguadilla, Puerto Rico	Active	
Tau Boriquén	Caguas, Puerto Rico	Active	
Ýpsilon Boriquén	Yauco, Puerto Rico	Active	
Omega Boriquén	San Germán, Puerto Rico	Active	
Alpha Columbia Boriquen	Washington, D.C.	Active	
Epsilon Columbia Boriquén	Miami, Florida	Active	
Tau Columbia Boriquén	Texas	Active	
Omega Columbia Boriquén	Orlando, Florida	Active	
Zeta Columbia Boriquén	North Carolina	Active	

== Notable members ==
Following is a list of some of the notable Phi Sigma Alpha members.

Don Luis A. Ferré (left)

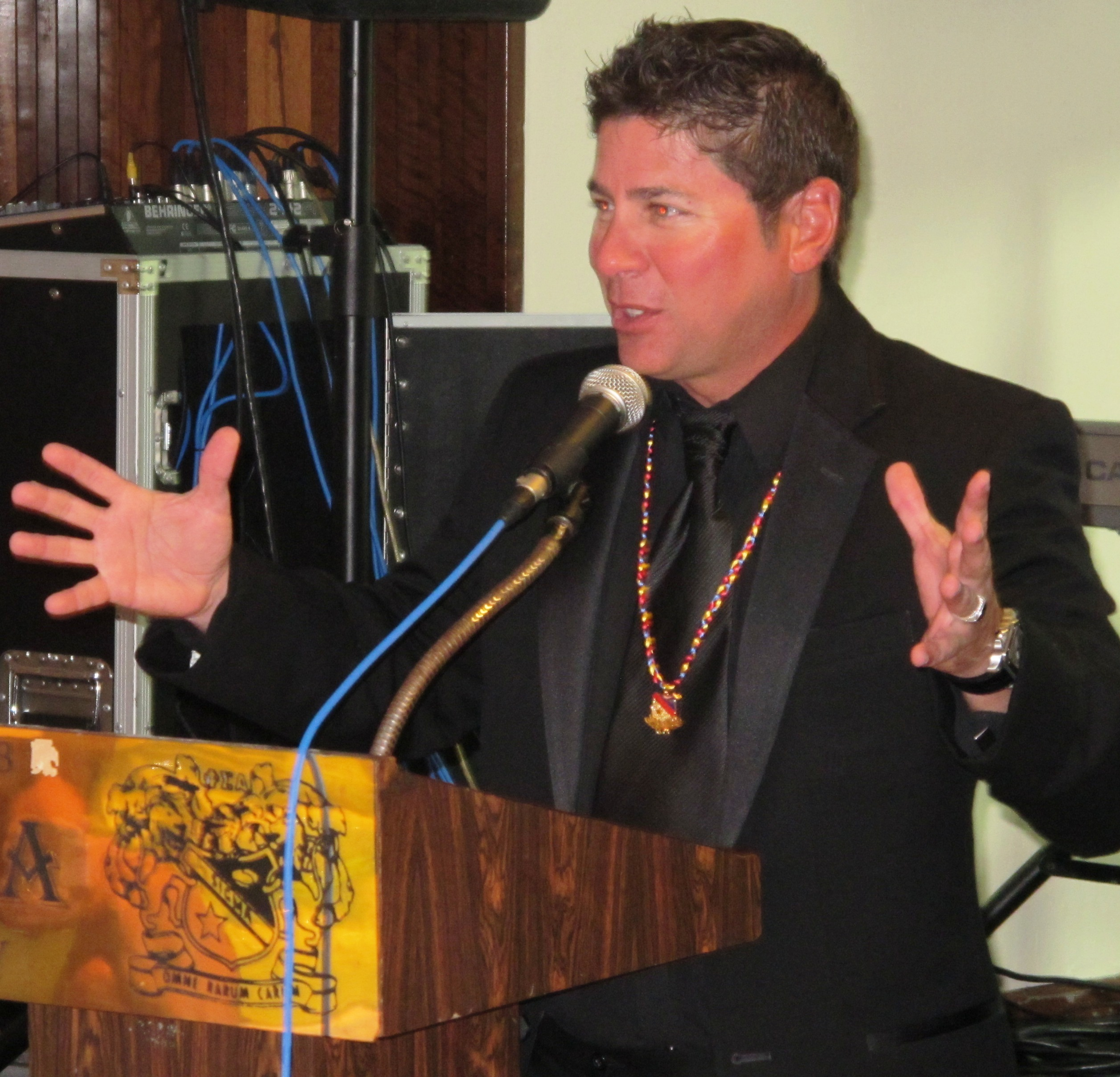
Raymond Arrieta

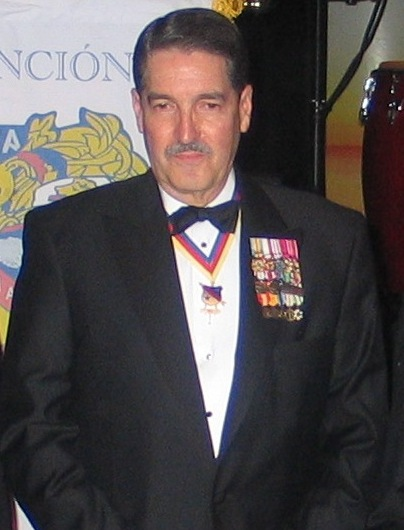
William Navas

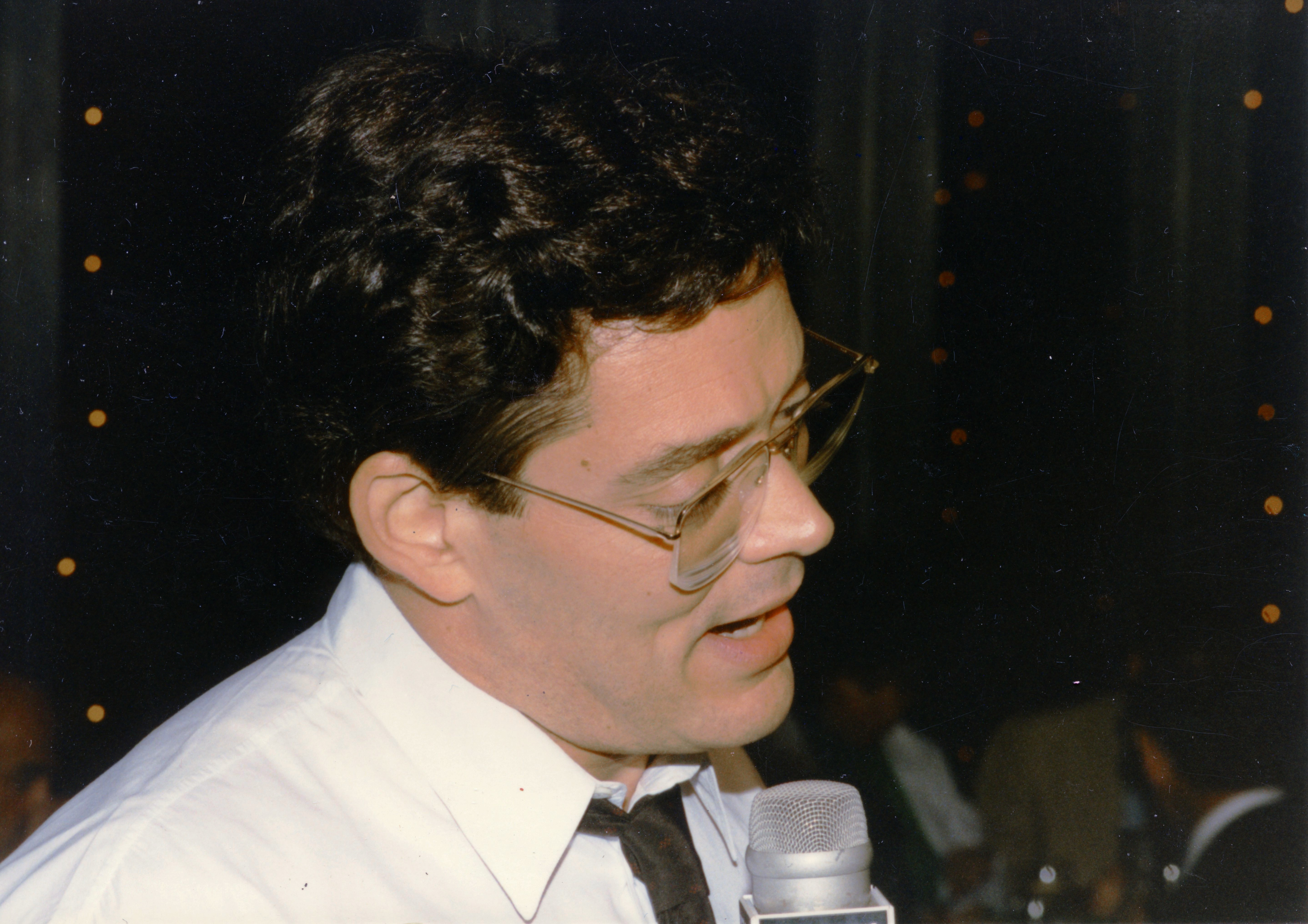
Raúl Juliá

Name	Chapter	Notability	References
Manuel Abreu Castillo		President of the Puerto Rico Bar Association; writer	
José Álvarez de Choudens	Alpha	Secretary of Health of Puerto Rico	
Santos P. Amadeo		Senate of Puerto Rico and constitutional law scholar	
Raúl M. Arias-Marxuach	Alpha Activo	Chief US District Judge of the US District Court for the District of Puerto Rico	
Raymond Arrieta	Alpha Activo	Comedian	
Eudaldo Báez Galib		Senate of Puerto Rico	
Guillermo A. Baralt		Author and historian	
José Emir Guilloty	Beta Activo	Puerto Rican professional volleyball player	
Eugenio S. Belaval		House of Representatives of Puerto Rico	
César Benito Cabrera		United States Ambassador to Mauritius and United States Ambassador to Seychelles	
Eduardo Bhatia		Speaker of the Senate of Puerto Rico	
Bartolomé Bonet Fussá	Beta Activo	Senate of Puerto Rico	
Herminio Brau del Toro		Lawyer, engineer, professor, writer, president of Puerto Rico Distillers	
Facundo Bueso Sanllehí	Alpha Activo	Guggenheim Fellow, physicist, and educator	
Agustín Carbó		Former executive director of the Puerto Rico Solid Waste Management Authority; chairman of the Puerto Rico Energy Commission	
Arturo L. Carrión Muñoz	Alpha Activo	Former executive vice president of the Puerto Rico Bankers Association	
Amador Cobas	Alpha	President of the University of Puerto Rico and Guggenheim Fellow	
Ernesto Colón Yordán	Alpha	Secretary of Health of Puerto Rico	
Antonio Colorado		Secretary of State of Puerto Rico and resident commissioner of Puerto Rico	
Carlos Contreras Aponte	Beta Activo	Secretary of the Puerto Rico Department of Transportation and Public Works	
David Cruz Vélez		Senate of Puerto Rico and former Ombudsman for Persons with Disabilities of Puerto Rico	
Charles Cuprill Oppenheimer		Major General of the Puerto Rico National Guard and dean of the Pontifical Catholic University of Puerto Rico School of Law	
Ruy Delgado Zayas		Secretary of Labor and Human Resources of Puerto Rico	
Noel Estrada		Composer of "En mi viejo San Juan"	
Eugenio Fernández Cerra		Senate of Puerto Rico	
Lionel Fernández Méndez		Senate of Puerto Rico	
Luis A. Ferré		Governor of Puerto Rico and Senate of Puerto Rico	
Jaime Frontera		Olympic basketball player and flag bearer for Puerto Rico in the 1968 Summer Olympics	
Mario García Palmieri		Secretary of Health of Puerto Rico	
Pedro González Ramos		President of Universidad del Sagrado Corazón	
Carlos Irizarry Yunqué		Supreme Court of Puerto Rico associate justice	
José Guillermo Izquierdo Stella		Senate of Puerto Rico and Puerto Rico House of Representatives	
Charles Henry Juliá Barreras		Senate of Puerto Rico	
Raul Julia	Alpha Activo	Actor	
José Victor Oliver Ledesma		Owner of P.R. Distillers	
Daniel López Romo	Beta Activo	United States Attorney for the United States District Court for the District of Puerto Rico; brigadier general and assistant adjutant general for air with the Puerto Rico Air National Guard	
Moncho Loubriel	Alpha Activo	Mascot of Vaqueros de Bayamón and Puerto Rico men's national basketball team	
Sol Luis Descartes		Secretary of Treasury of Puerto Rico and president of the Interamerican University of Puerto Rico	
José Menéndez Monroig		Senate of Puerto Rico	
Justo A. Méndez Rodriguez	Beta Activo	Secretary of Agriculture of Puerto Rico and Senate of Puerto Rico	
José Miguel Agrelot		Comedian and Guinness record holder	
Adolfo L. Monserrate Anselmi		Member of the House of Representatives of Puerto Rico	
Angel Morey		Secretary of State of Puerto Rico	
Ángel Morey Noble	Alpha Activo	House of Representatives of Puerto Rico	
William A. Navas Jr.	Beta Activo	United States sub-secretary of the Navy; General	
Isidro A. Negrón Irizarry	Delta Activo	Mayor of the city of San German	
Adán Nigaglioni Loyola		Dean of the University of Puerto Rico School of Medicine	
Hernán Nigaglioni		Cultural promoter, educator, and public servant	
Salvador M. Padilla Escabi	Beta Activo	Secretary of State of Puerto Rico and Puerto Rico Adjutant General	
Rafael Pont Flores		WKAQ sports commentator and sports columnist for El Mundo	
Luis Fernando Pumarada O'Neill	Beta Activo	Engineer, historian, and academic	
Mako Oliveras	Alpha Activo	Minor League Baseball player and manager	
Hernán Padilla		Member of the House of Representatives of Puerto Rico; two-term Mayor of San Juan	
Leo Perez Minaya		founder and former chair of Democrats Abroad in the Dominican Republic	
Enrique Pérez Santiago		Secretary of Health of Puerto Rico	
Santiago Polanco-Abreu		Speaker of the Puerto Rico House of Representatives and Resident Commissioner of Puerto Rico	
José Luís Purcell Rodríguez		Judge in the Superior Court of Puerto Rico; founded the Puerto Rico Volleyball Federation	
Hiram Rafael Cancio		District Judge of the United States District Court for the District of Puerto Rico	
Ubaldino Ramírez de Arellano		House of Representatives of Puerto Rico and professional basketball player	
William Riefkohl		Executive director of the Puerto Rico Manufacturers Association	
Marco Rigau Gaztambide		Associate Justice of the Supreme Court of Puerto Rico	
Marco Antonio Rigau		Senate of Puerto Rico	
Juan A. Rivero	Beta Activo	Biologist, author, and founder of Dr. Juan A. Rivero Zoo	
Pedro N. Rivera	Beta Activo	Brigadier General and first Hispanic to be named medical commander in the U.S. Air Force	
Gaspar Rivera Cestero		House of Representatives of Puerto Rico	
Osvaldo Rivera Cianchini		Judge and founder of the San Blas Half Marathon	
José Rodríguez Quiles		Former member of the House of Representatives of Puerto Rico	
Manuel Rodríguez Ramos		Secretary of Justice of Puerto Rico and law professor	
José M. Saldaña		President of the University of Puerto Rico	
Oscar A. San Antonio Mendoza		Member of the House of Representatives of Puerto Rico and Sergeant-at-Arms of the House of Representatives	
Eduardo Santiago Delpín	Alpha	Surgeon who wrote the first book in Spanish about organ transplants	
Jaime Santiago		Olympic sports shooter	
Julio A. Santos Rivera		House of Representatives of Puerto Rico	
Luis Somoza Debayle		President of Nicaragua	
Luis Stefani		Chancellor of the University of Puerto Rico at Mayagüez	
Hugo David Storer Tavarez		Director of promotion of the Puerto Rico Economic Development Administration	
Ramón Torres Braschi		Superintendent of the Puerto Rico Police Department	
Enrique "Coco" Vicéns		Senate of Puerto Rico	
Chente Ydrach	Alpha Activo	Stand-up comedian and podcaster	
Eddie Zavála Vázquez		House of Representatives of Puerto Rico	

== See also ==
- Union Latino Americana
- Concilio Interfraternitario Puertorriqueño de la Florida
- Puerto Rican fraternities and sororities
