= Belaval =

Belaval is a surname. Notable people with this surname include:

- Edgar Belaval (1910–1989), Puerto Rican lawyer
- Emilio Belaval Maldonado (1903–1972), Puerto Rican lawyer
- Emilio S. Belaval (1903–1973), Puerto Rican lawyer and writer
- Eugenio S. Belaval (1925–1999), Puerto Rican law professor
- Joseph S. Belaval (1879–1953), Puerto Rican obstetrician
- Philippe Bélaval (born 1955), French army official
- Yvon Belaval (1910–1989), French philosopher
