= Agustín Carbó =

Puerto Rican lawyer

Chairman of the Puerto Rico Energy Commission
- In office August 2014 – 2017
- Appointed by: Alejandro García Padilla
- Succeeded by: José H. Román (Interim)

Executive Director of the Puerto Rico Solid Waste Authority
- In office January 2013 – August 2014
- Appointed by: Alejandro García Padilla

Personal details
- Born: Agustín Francisco Carbó Lugo; February 27, 1970 (age 56) Mayagüez, Puerto Rico
- Education: Northeastern University (BS, MS); Vermont Law School (JD); Yale University (M.E.M.)

Agustín Francisco Carbó Lugo (Note: In this Spanish name, the first or paternal surname is Carbó and the second or maternal family name is Lugo.) (born February 27, 1970) is an energy and environmental lawyer, and board member of Resilient Power Puerto Rico.

== Education ==
He holds a Bachelor of Science and Master of Science degree in civil and environmental engineering from Northeastern University, a juris doctor from Vermont Law School, and a master of environmental management from Yale University. Carbó is also a member of the Phi Sigma Alpha fraternity.

== Career ==
He previously served as the inaugural Director of the Puerto Rico Grid Recovery and Modernization Team at the U.S. Department of Energy (DOE), where he worked on Puerto Rico's grid modernization and recovery efforts. Before joining the DOE, Carbó Lugo was Director of Energy Transition at the Environmental Defense Fund, where he focused on energy policy and community-driven solar and storage projects to bring clean, affordable, and reliable electricity to Puerto Rico. He also served as the first chairman of the Puerto Rico Energy Commission (PREC) and the executive director of the Puerto Rico Solid Waste Authority under the administration of governor Alejandro García Padilla. He was an Assistant Regional Counsel for the United States Environmental Protection Agency.
