= Eugenio Fernández =

Eugenio Fernández may refer to:

- Eugenio Fernández Granell, a Spanish surrealist painter
- Eugenio Fernández Cerra (born 1920), Puerto Rican politician
- Eugenio Fernández Quintanilla (1887–1932), Spanish architect
