= Martín Peña Bridge =

Historic bridge in San Juan, Puerto Rico

- U.S. National Register of Historic Places
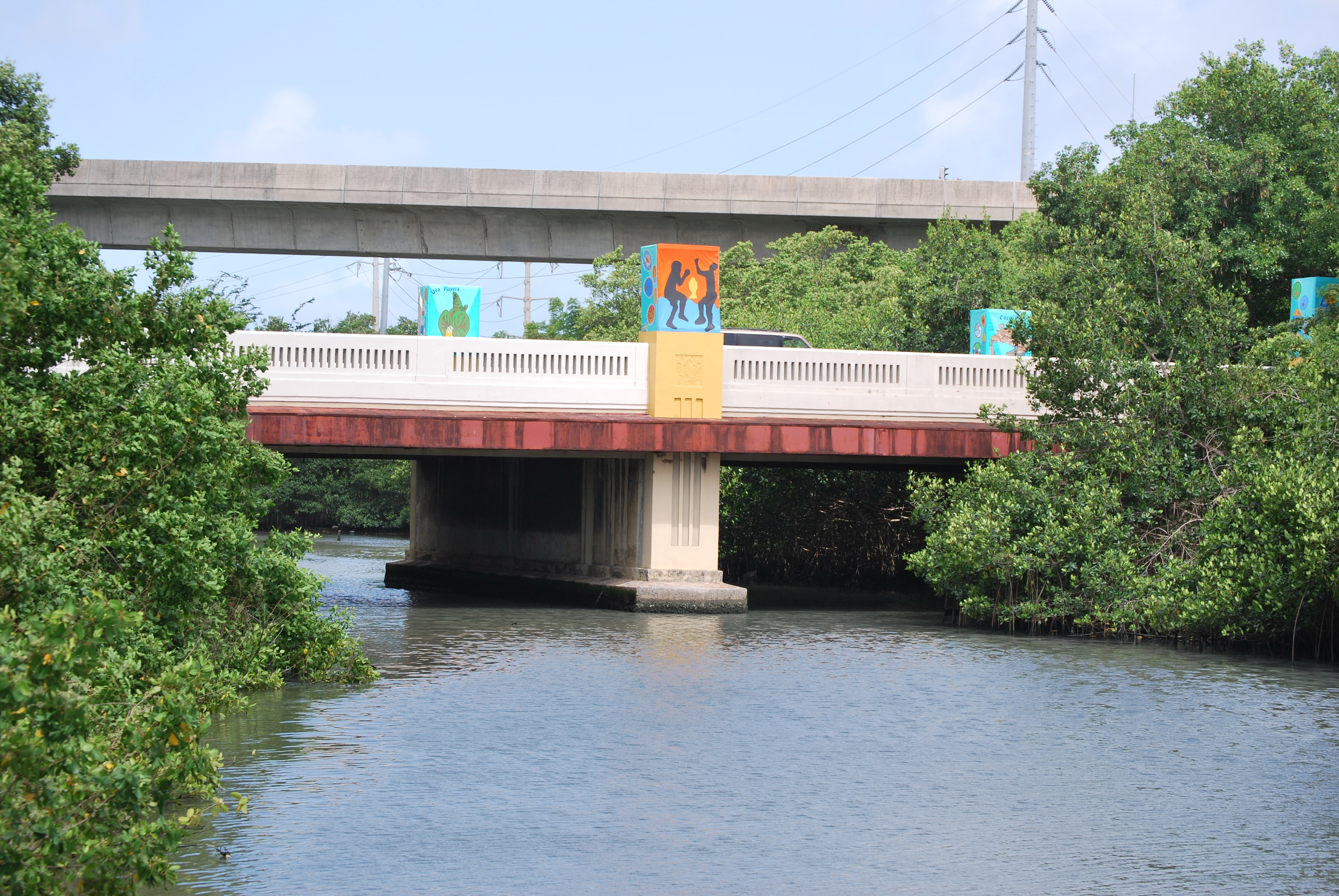

- Location within Puerto Rico
- Nearest city: San Juan, Puerto Rico
- Coordinates: 18.43342°N 66.05906°W
- Built: 1939
- Architect: Delgado, Cecilio; et al.
- Architectural style: Art Deco
- MPS: Historic Bridges of Puerto Rico MPS
- NRHP reference No.: 08000856
- Added to NRHP: August 27, 2008

Martín Peña Bridge, in Spanish properly known as Puente Martín Peña, is an Art Deco style bridge from 1939, designed by Cecilio Delgado and others. It crosses the Martín Peña Channel in San Juan, Puerto Rico.

It was listed on the U.S. National Register of Historic Places in 2008.

== History ==
The original Martín Peña Bridge was simply a stone causeway probably built around the mid-1500s. Later, a wooden bridge was built on top of the causeway, which was in turn replaced by a brick edification in 1784. This bridge, designed by Juan Francisco Mestre, was destroyed by the British during Ralph Abercromby's invasion of Puerto Rico. After this, the bridge was rebuilt in 1846 with a design by engineer Santiago Cortijo. This new bridge measured 220 feet long and 6 meters wide, and was composed of nine elliptical arches.

According to a book by Luis Pumarada O'Neill and Maria de los Angeles Castro, the name of Martín Peña comes from a fisherman who operated a cove near the area.

== Gallery ==
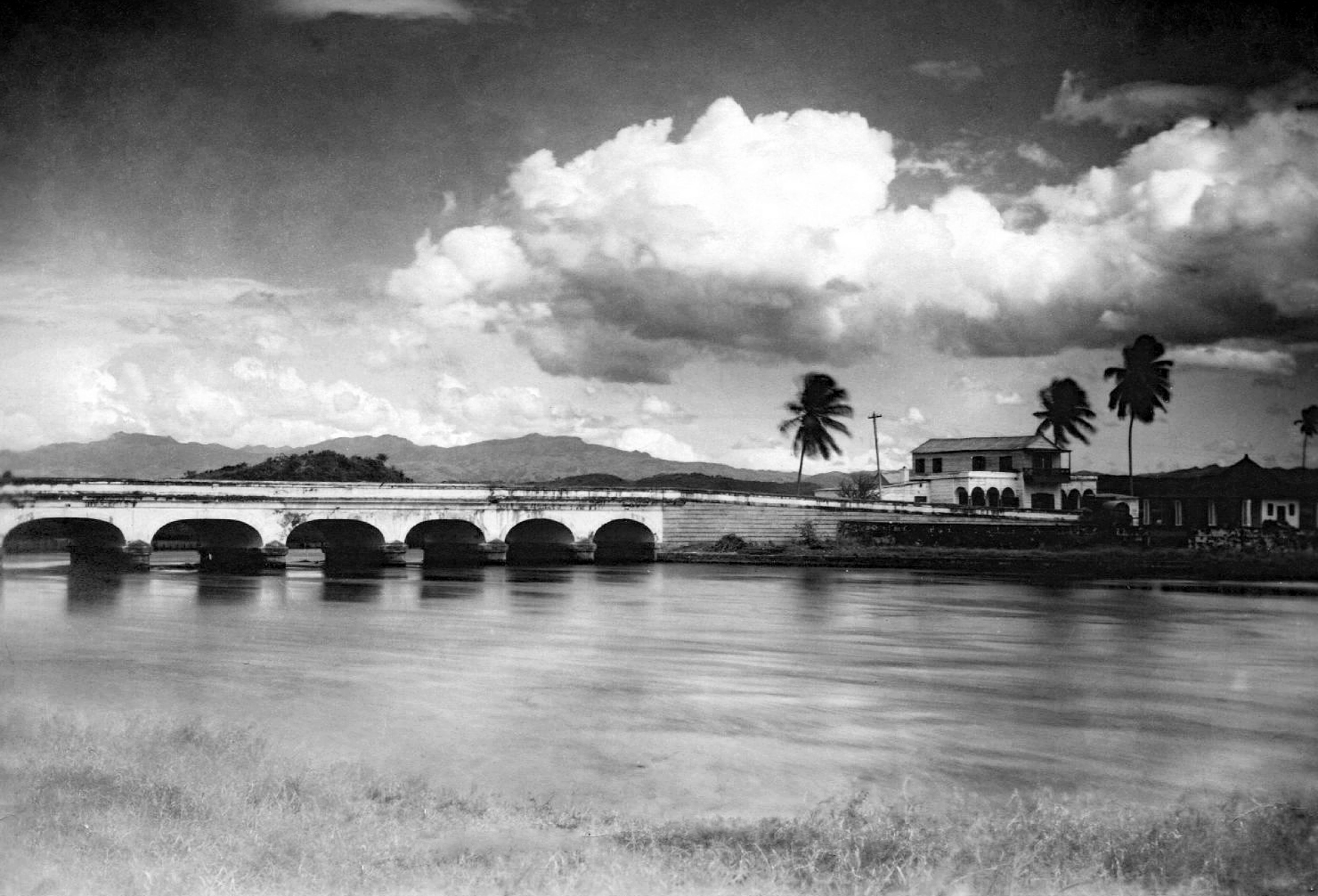
Bridge in 1906

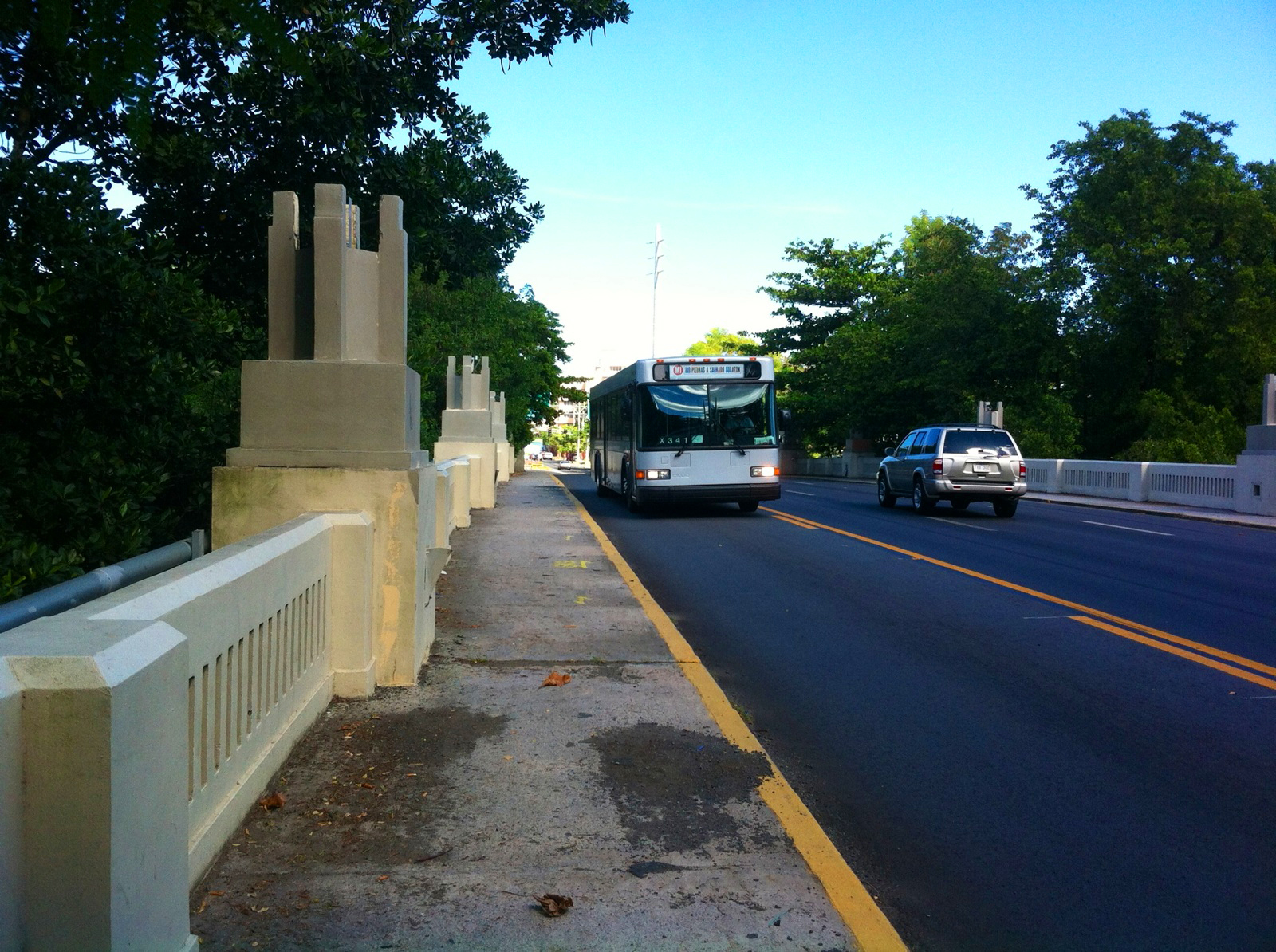
Bridge in 2012
