= Riefkohl =

Riefkohl is the surname of the following people:

- Frederick Lois Riefkohl (1889–1969), Puerto Rican officer in the United States Navy
- Rafael Bernabe Riefkohl (born 1959), Puerto Rican politician
- Rudolph W. Riefkohl (1885–1950), Puerto Rican officer in the United States Army, brother of Frederick
- William Riefkohl (born 1939), Executive Director of the Puerto Rico Manufacturers Association
