= Cerra =

Cerra is a surname. Notable people with the surname include:

- Adam Cerra (born 1999), Australian rules footballer
- Erica Cerra (born 1979), Canadian actress
- Eugenio Fernández Cerra (1920–2011), Puerto Rican physician and politician
- Jessica Cerra (born 1982), American racing cyclist
- Juan Ignacio Cerra (born 1976), Argentinian hammer thrower
- Maria Cerra (1918–2015), American fencer

== See also ==
- David Cerrajería (born 1983), Spanish footballer
- Gondwana Rainforests, previously the Central Eastern Rainforest Reserves
