= Arturo L. Carrión Muñoz =

Puerto Rican banker

Arturo L. Carrión Muñoz (born November 6, 1933) is a Puerto Rican banker. He served as the Executive Vice-President of the Puerto Rico Bankers Association from 1980 to 2015.

Born in Santurce, Puerto Rico, he obtained his bachelor's in Business Administration form the University of Puerto Rico. Then he graduated from the American Institute of Banking where he was later an instructor for 19 years. He then graduated from the Stonier Graduate School of Banking while it was hosted by Rutgers University. In 1951 he joined the Alpha Activo chapter of Phi Sigma Alpha fraternity.

From 1955 to 1986 he worked at Banco Popular de Puerto Rico. He was the national president of the National Exchange Club in 1970. He was the president of the organizing committee of the 1979 Pan American Games and president of the Puerto Rico Tourism Consulting Board in 1987. Furthermore, he represented the service industry in the board of directors of the Puerto Rico Manufacturers Association. In 2018 he was awarded the Luis Muñoz Marín Medal by the Popular Democratic Party.
