= Cestero =

Cestero is a surname. Notable people with the surname include:

- Gaspar Rivera Cestero (1912–?), Puerto Rican lawyer and politician
- Jorge Cestero (born 2006), Spanish footballer
- José Cestero (1938–2014), Puerto Rican basketballer
- Tulio Manuel Cestero (1877–1955), Dominican poet, novelist, essayist, playwright, politician and diplomat
