= Manufacturing in Puerto Rico =

Manufacturing in Puerto Rico is the largest economic sector in the economy of Puerto Rico; composing almost half (about 46%) of the gross domestic product (GDP) of Puerto Rico. All manufacturers in Puerto Rico are in some way interconnected with the Puerto Rico Industrial Development Company (PRIDCO) which provides substantial incentives for companies that manufacture in Puerto Rico. Manufacturers are also voluntarily interconnected through the Puerto Rico Manufacturers Association which serves as their primary trade association and their main lobby group upon the Legislative Assembly of Puerto Rico. Most manufacturing in Puerto Rico today is the product of Operation Bootstrap.

== History ==
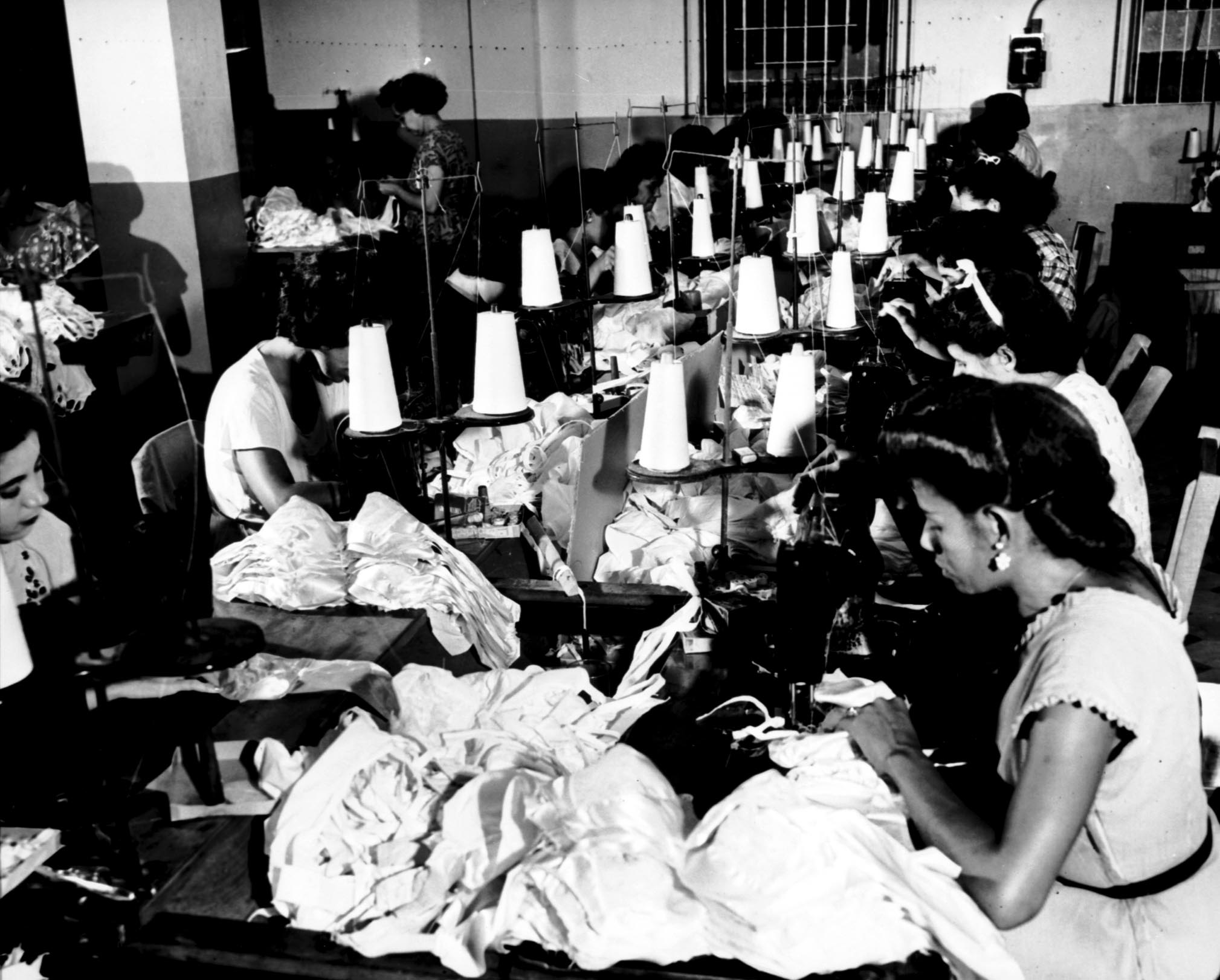
Women making brassieres at the Jem Manufacturing Corp. in Puerto Rico, March 1950

Manufacturing in Puerto Rico has evolved significantly over time, shaped by economic policies and industrial shifts. In the 1940s, the needlework industry accounted for more than half of the island's manufacturing employment. However, wages were low, with most workers (primarily women) earning between one and two cents per hour. During the 1950s and 1960s, Puerto Rico transitioned away from an agriculture-based economy to an industrial one as part of Operation Bootstrap. To attract external investment, tax incentives were introduced in 1947, contributing to an expansion of factories producing consumer goods such as apparel.

By the late 1960s, the manufacturing sector shifted from labor-intensive industries such as textiles to capital-intensive industries like chemical and electronics production. Between 1940 and 1960, per-worker gross national product (GNP) increased from $932 to $2,733, while the average annual income surpassed $500 for the first time.

From the 1970s to 1996, manufacturers based outside Puerto Rico benefited from tax incentives such as Section 936, which allowed corporations to reduce tax liabilities while maintaining limited on-island employment. For instance, Microsoft classified software copied onto discs in Puerto Rico as island-generated profit, despite employing fewer than 200 workers there.

Since the mid-1990s, some manufacturers departed; however, Puerto Rico remains a key center for pharmaceutical production. The island has become the largest exporter of medical supplies in the United States, surpassing states such as California and Indiana. The pharmaceutical industry now generates approximately $40 billion annually, representing 30% of Puerto Rico's manufacturing output and employing 90,000 workers, who earn wages 60% higher than the island's average manufacturing job.

The Puerto Rican government is trying to convince international companies to relocate their manufacturing plants to Puerto Rico, where they would be exempt from customs duties.

== Advantages ==
Key advantages to the manufacturing sector in Puerto Rico include laws, the labor force, and trade routes. Manufacturing activity is covered by the laws and regulations of the federal government of the United States, including the Environmental Protection Agency (EPA), U.S. labor laws, and the Occupational Safety and Health Act (OSHA).

The labor force is bilingual (Spanish and English). Workers enjoy the rights and privileges of American citizenship, allowing defense contractors to base operations in Puerto Rico or use Puerto Rico force for nearshoring.

In trade, Puerto Rico offers a shorter route point from Africa and South America.

In January 2024, the State of Puerto Rico relaxed its remote work requirements with Act 52–2022, which exempts foreign employers with no connection to Puerto Rico from withholding income tax for employees working remotely in Puerto Rico, provided certain conditions are met.

== Disadvantages ==
Disadvantages of manufacturing in Puerto Rico include: government monopolies on public utilities and worker's compensation, high level of government corruption, and additional laws and regulation than those imposed by the federal government of the United States.
