= Senator Negron =

Senator Negron may refer to:

- Joe Negron (born 1961), Florida State Senate
- Enrique Rodríguez Negrón (1933–2022), Senate of Puerto Rico
