= Charles Henry Juliá Barreras =

Puerto Rican politician (1908–1878)

Charles H. Juliá Barreras

Member of the Puerto Rico Senate from the at-large district
- In office 1952–1964

Personal details
- Born: Charles Henry Juliá Barreras; May 7, 1908 Morovis, Puerto Rico
- Died: July 28, 1979 (aged 71) Santurce, Puerto Rico
- Party: Partido Estadista Republicano
- Other political affiliations: Republican
- Education: University of Puerto Rico (BA); University of Puerto Rico School of Law (JD)

Military service
- Branch/service: United States Army
- Rank: Major

Charles Henry Juliá Barreras (May 7, 1908 – July 28, 1979) was a Puerto Rican politician and judge. He was a three-time member of the Senate of Puerto Rico, serving from 1952 to 1964.

== Early life ==
Juliá Barreras was born on May 7, 1908, in Morovis, Puerto Rico.

He attended the University of Puerto Rico, Rio Piedras Campus. While there, he was a founding member of Phi Sigma Alpha fraternity on October 22, 1928. Served in the United States Army with the rank of Major during the World War II era.

== Career ==
Juliá Barreras was elected as a delegate for the district of San Juan to the board of the Puerto Rico Bar Association on September 1, 1938. He was a three-time member of the Senate of Puerto Rico. He won a seat in the Senate of Puerto Rico for the Partido Estadista Republicano in the 1952, 1956 and 1960 elections. His last term ended in 1964.

He was a delegate to Republican National Convention from Puerto Rico in 1956 and 1960. In the seventies he was also a judge in San Juan.

== Personal history ==
In 1931, Juliá Barreras was the fourth president of Phi Sigma Alpha fraternity.

Juliá Barreras died on July 28, 1979. He was interred at the Puerto Rico National Cemetery in Bayamón, Puerto Rico.
