= Santos P. Amadeo =

Puerto Rican politician

Member of the Puerto Rico Senate from the At-Large district
- In office 1961–1964

Personal details
- Born: Santos Primo Amadeo Semidey; June 9, 1902 Salinas, Puerto Rico
- Died: August 25, 1980 (aged 78) San Juan, Puerto Rico
- Party: Republican Party of Puerto Rico
- Education: University of Michigan (BA); Northwestern University (JD); Columbia University (Ph.D)
- Occupation: Lawyer, Politician, Professor

Santos Primo Amadeo Semidey (June 9, 1902 – August 25, 1980), a.k.a. "Champion of Hábeas Corpus," was an attorney and law professor at the University of Puerto Rico, a Senator in the Puerto Rico legislature, and counsel to the American Civil Liberties Union branch in Puerto Rico, established in 1937.

He founded the Phi Sigma Alpha fraternity in Puerto Rico.

== Early years and education ==
Born in Salinas, Puerto Rico, Amadeo Semidey received his elementary education in Salinas and in the towns of Patillas and Fajardo. His family moved to Rhode Island, where he graduated from East Greenwich Academy in 1923. He attended the University of Michigan, where he earned a bachelor's degree in political science.

Amadeo Semidey later studied law at Northwestern University near Chicago and earned his Juris Doctor in 1935. Amadeo Semidey completed his Ph.D. in law in 1938, while teaching as a professor in Columbia University. His doctoral thesis, titled Argentine Constitutional Law, was published by the Columbia University Press.

== Academic career ==
From 1928 to 1969, Amadeo Semidey taught anthropology and law in the University of Puerto Rico. On October 22, 1928, he became a founding member of Phi Sigma Alpha fraternity and served as its first president.

After several years, he returned to the United States for graduate study, completing a law degree at Northwestern and a PhD in law at Columbia University.

Upon returning to Puerto Rico, amadeo Semidey taught in the law school at the university for more than 30 years. At the end of his career, he was awarded the title of Professor Emeritus.

He wrote several book about the law (see Works below).

== Lawyer and expert ==
In 1937, a branch of the American Civil Liberties Union had been established in Puerto Rico following the United States investigation of the Ponce massacre. For many years, Amadeo Semidey was the counsel for the ACLU and its leader in Puerto Rico.

In 1939, Amadeo Semidey, besides teaching in the UPR, established a private law practice. He became active in defending political prisoners.

Amadeo Semidey served as legal counselor to the Economic War Board in Puerto Rico during World War II; to various committees in the US Senate; to the delegation of the Partido Estadista Republicano (Republican Statehood Party), and to the Puerto Rican Status commission.

On May 21, 1948, a bill was introduced before the Puerto Rican Senate which would restrain the rights of the independence and Nationalist movements on the archipelago. The Senate, which at the time was controlled by the Partido Popular Democrático (PPD), approved the bill that day. This bill, which resembled the anti-communist Smith Act passed in the United States in 1940, became known as the Ley de la Mordaza (Gag Law, technically "Law 53 of 1948") when the U.S.-appointed governor of Puerto Rico, Jesús T. Piñero, signed it into law on June 10, 1948. Amadeo Semidey challenged the resulting crackdown on the Nationalist Party and other dissidents. He used the hábeas corpus action, in order to expedite the release of Puerto Rican political prisoners, and to question the constitutionality of the Gag Law. He brought a habeas corpus action before the U.S. Supreme Court, on behalf of Enrique Ayoroa Abreu, who had been arrested following the Ponce massacre. Amadeo Semidey and other attorneys also defended 15 members of the Puerto Rican Nationalist Party who were charged with violating this law.

== Political career ==
In 1960, Amadeo Semidey first ran for the Puerto Rican Senate and was elected. He served for two terms, from 1961 to 1964, and authored numerous laws which clarified and strengthened the civil rights of Puerto Ricans. This included Concurrent Resolution 1, which created the Civil Rights Commission in both the Senate and the Camera of Representatives of Puerto Rico.

Four of his five policy recommendations were incorporated into the U.S. Federal Financial Law of 1966. U.S. President Lyndon Baines Johnson gave Amadeo Semidey the presidential pen, with which he signed the statute.

== Later years ==
In 1971, President Richard M. Nixon, honored Amadeo Semidey with an "Honor Designation" for the contributions which he made to the fields of International Criminology and Criminal Justice.

Amadeo Semidey died in San Juan on August 25, 1980. He was buried at Buxeda Cemetery in Carolina, Puerto Rico.

== Legacy ==
- The government of Puerto Rico commissioned a statue of him in his honor.
- The Judicial Court of San Juan was named for him, as Edificio Doctor Santos P. Amadeo. *His hometown of Salinas named a street in his honor.
- 2008 the government of Puerto Rico established June 9, his birthday, to be celebrated annually as "Doctor Santos P. Amadeo Birthday Commemoration."
- The Puerto Rico Bar Association headquarters has a statue of him in the lobby.

== Selected writings ==
- Argentine Constitutional Law: The Judicial Function of the Federal System and the Preservation of Individual Rights (1943);
- Daños y Perjuicios por Muerte Ilegal (1944);
- Acciones civiles de daños y perjuicios en el derecho puertorriqueño por el uso injustificado de los procedimientos legales (1945)
- La Revisión Judicial de la Comisión Industrial de Puerto Rico (1946);
- Revisión Judicial de las Juntas Examinadoras (1946);
- El Tribunal de Contribuciones de Puerto Rico (1947)
- La revisión judicial de los poderes de la Comisión de Servicio Público de Puerto Rico (1947)
- El Habeas Corpus en Puerto Rico (1948);
- La Revisión Judicial de los Poderes del Gobernador de Puerto Rico (1949);
- Los Poderes de los Tribunales de Puerto Rico para Castigar por Desacato (1949/1961); and *School of Penal Thought Reflected in Modern Penal Legislation (1950).
- Curso de derecho penal basado en el código penal de Puerto Rico (1960)
  - Recursos extraordinarios:disposiciones constitucionales, legislación, jurisprudencia y lecturas (1962)

== See also ==
- List of Puerto Ricans
- Phi Sigma Alpha
