= Leo Perez Minaya =

American writer

Leovigildo Pérez Minaya
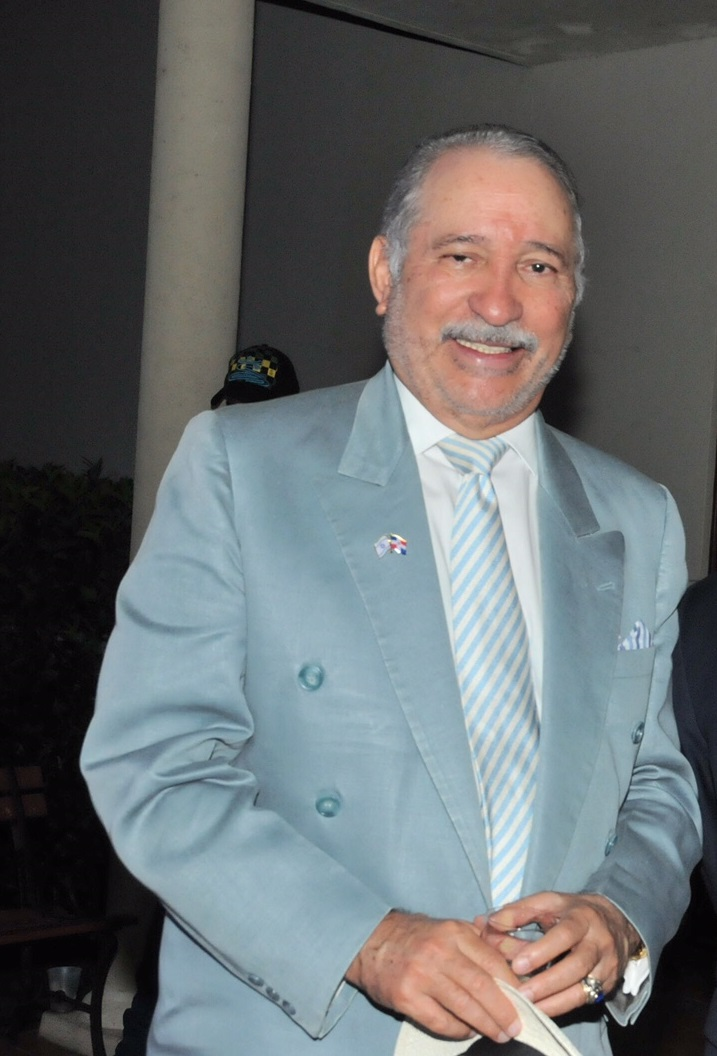
- Born: Santo Domingo, Dominican Republic
- Education: Master of Science in Civil Engineering
- Alma mater: Stanford University, University of Puerto Rico at Mayagüez
- Occupations: Engineer, real estate developer, entrepreneur, writer, and president, dalmary corporation ltd

Leovigildo Perez Minaya is an American businessman, engineer, developer, writer and entrepreneur based in the Dominican Republic. He is the President of the Dominican-Israeli Chamber of Commerce and the senior member of the US consulate Warden Program. He is a member of Phi Sigma Alpha fraternity, having joined the Beta chapter.

Pérez Minaya is the founder and former Chair of Democrats Abroad Dominican Republic, as well as the former Regional vice-chair for the Americas of the Democratic Party Committee Abroad (DPCA).

== Early life and education ==
Pérez Minaya was born on September 28, 1939. He received his BS in civil engineering from University of Puerto Rico in 1963 and MS in civil engineering from Stanford University in 1965.

== Career ==
During the 1980s, Pérez Minaya served as a contractor to USAID Mission in the Dominican Republic and directed the Energy Conservation and Resource Development Project. The project involved effective planning and guidance to the government regarding energy problems. During the same time, he served as the Director of PIDE project, a project under the Supervision of the Education Minister with the objective to improve the elementary school system in rural areas of the southern part of the Dominican Republic.

In the 80s, Pérez Minaya was the Infratur Director for the Central Bank of the Dominican Republic, which had the responsibility to develop the Dominican Republic's tourism infrastructure. Years later, Pérez Minaya conceived and implemented the conceptual ideas and design of the Cap Cana tourist resort project. He has also been involved in large tourism projects in Eastern Dominican Republic. Pérez Minaya is active in the development of luxury tourist condominiums in Cap Cana Resort.

He was a full-time professor at the school of Engineering at the University of Puerto Rico, Mayaguez for more than a decade. He also helped to develop over one hundred low income housing projects in Puerto Rico.

In 2015, the government of the Dominican Republic, through the Secretary of Foreign Affairs, appointed Pérez Minaya as one of the honorary members of the National Border Council, an organization that has the responsibility of monitoring issues such as security control, infrastructure development, alternative energy sources, immigration and construction of schools and hospitals. Pérez Minaya also regularly attends informal meeting of scientific-discussion groups such as astronomy, evolution theory; human rights and the environment.

== Present Projects in Development ==
At the present time, Pérez Minaya has three very important projects in-progress in the Dominican Republic with a total development cost of over $250 million.

Panache is a residential development project to be located within Cap Cana, a 30,000-acre luxury resort destination near Punta Cana, Dominican Republic (10-minute drive from Punta Cana International Airport). Panache will feature exclusive amenities for owners and guests, within Cap Cana, such as 48 restaurants, access to Jack Nicklaus signature golf course, marina, beach clubs, international school, marketplace, equestrian center, and a natural theme park, water sports, tennis, trails and sidewalks, cultural and highly entertaining experiences. The operator will be Solvere Living (Solutions Advisors Group), which currently manages 19 communities in the United States and has six projects in the pipeline.

Highlights of Panache include:

- 1, 2 and 3-bedroom apartments of high standards, fully furnished with state-of-the-art appliances and furniture
- 24-hour security among peaceful surroundings and Caribbean style landscapes
- Access to health care centers in the surrounding area
- Fifteen-year Tax Exemption
- Full convertibility and transferability of US dividends

Another project in which Pérez Minaya is actively involved in is the development of two photovoltaic power plants in the Dominican Republic.

== Political involvement ==
Pérez Minaya is the founder and former Chair of Democrats Abroad in the Dominican Republic as well as the former Regional vice-chair for the Americas of the Democratic Party Committee Abroad (DPCA).

Since 2000, he has represented the US Democratic Party in the Dominican Republic and has assisted in registering thousands of voters in order to help Americans exercise there voting rights. Most recently, he led the Biden Campaign in the Dominican Republic and again aided in registering thousands of American voters.

From 2006 to 2012, he was a Member of the Democratic National Committee (DNC) and was an active member of the DNC Hispanic Caucus. During the 2008 presidential election, he was a superdelegate. In 2008, the presidential nominee Barack Obama appointed Minaya as a member of his National Finance Committee as well as the representative of the Democratic Party in Latin America.

In 2010, Pérez Minaya was appointed Trustee for the Democratic Senatorial Campaign Committee. During the 2016 general elections, Pérez Minaya was a member of the Latino Finance Council for the Hillary For America Campaign and appeared on television programs as a Latino surrogate for the campaign.

Pérez Minaya is frequently invited to TV and radio programs to explain the current political environment and ongoing issues. Over the years he has appeared in hundreds of programs.

== Personal life ==
Pérez Minaya is married to Altagracia Saba and has five daughters and one son.
