= Herminio Brau del Toro =

Puerto Rican academic (1922–1998)

Herminio M. Brau del Toro (August 27, 1922, in Cabo Rojo, Puerto Rico – June 6, 1998, in San Juan, Puerto Rico), was a Puerto Rican lawyer, engineer, professor, writer and industrialist.

== Early life and education ==
He was born on August 27, 1922, in Cabo Rojo, Puerto Rico, to Hemenio Brau Delgado and Cándida Rosa del Toro Montalvo. He graduated from the College of Agriculture and Mechanical Arts in Mayagüez with a degree in engineering in 1944. There he joined the Beta-Activo chapter of Phi Sigma Alpha fraternity, he was chapter president from 1943 to 1944. He obtained a master's degree from the New York University in 1949 and his doctorate from the University of Louisiana at Lafayette in 1956. Afterwards he studied law and earned his Juris Doctor Degree from the University of Puerto Rico School of Law in 1964.

== Career and later life ==
He wrote many works, legal and scientific articles. During his life he presided many institutions such as, the Puerto Rico Manufacturers Association, the Association of Rum Producers, Phi Sigma Alpha Fraternity, and the "Club Caborrojeño del Área Metropolitana" this last one he was a founder and honorary president. He was a member and council for a number of boards and commissions in the private and public sector. He belonged to the Bar Association of Puerto Rico, the Colegio de Ingenieros y Agrimensores de Puerto Rico, and was admitted to the Federal District Court of Puerto Rico and the United States Court of Appeals for the First Circuit. He was president of Puerto Rico Distillers Inc. He died on 6 June 1998 in San Juan, Puerto Rico, at age 75.

The "Club Caborrojeño del Área Metropolitana" offers the Herminio Brau del Toro Scholarship for engineering or natural science students of the University of Puerto Rico at Mayagüez.

== Selected writings ==
- La anotación preventiva de créditos refaccionarios : cambios introducidos a esta figura jurídica por la ley hipotecaria de 1979 (Revista jurídica de la Universidad Interamericana de Puerto Rico, vol. 15, núm. 2; ene.-abr. 1981: p 269–300. bibl. 1981)
- Apuntes para un Curso sobre el Estado del Derecho Inmobiliario Registral Puertorriqueño bajo la Ley Hipotecaria de 1893 ()
- Los daños y perjuicios extracontractuales en Puerto Rico(, (1986)
