= Commonwealth Oil Refining Company =

Former oil refinery in Peñuelas and Guayanilla in Puerto Rico

Commonwealth Oil Refining Company, Inc. (CORCO) was an oil refinery established in the towns of Peñuelas and Guayanilla in Puerto Rico in the second half of the 20th century. At one point, the company was ranked among the 500 largest in the United States by Fortune Magazine. In 1978, it supplied 80% of all petroleum products consumed in Puerto Rico and, at 2700 employees, it was Puerto Rico's largest employer. In addition, it was considered "among the largest independent petroleum refiners and petrochemical producers in the world."

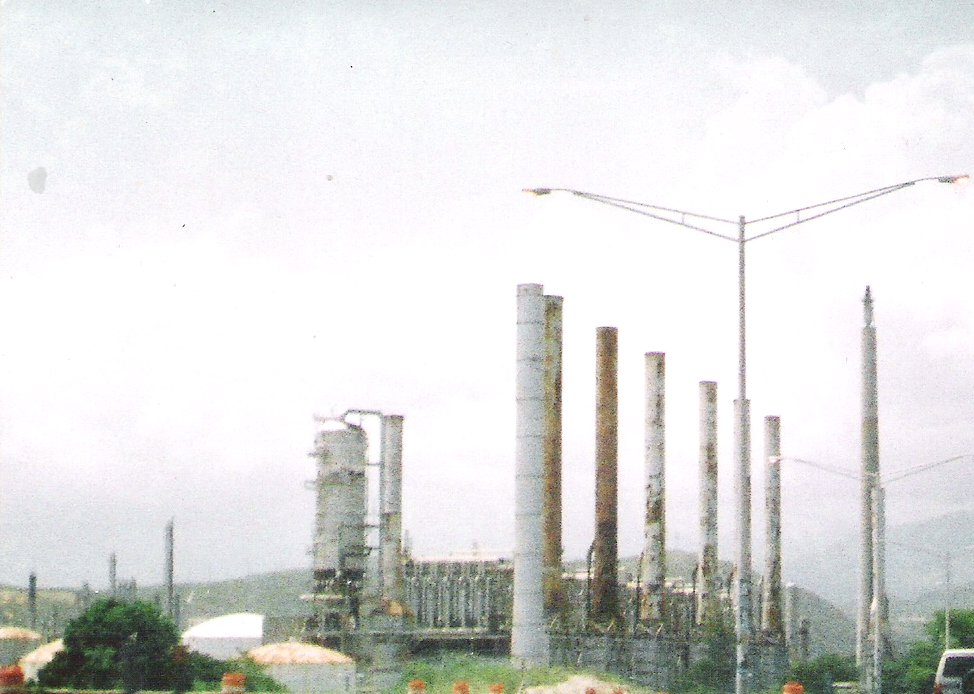
A portion of the inactive CORCO Refinery, as seen from PR-2 highway in 2005

== History ==
The project started as part of Operation Bootstrap with the first unit being constructed in 1954. The company started operations in 1956. Hugo David Storer Tavarez was one of the men in charge of seeing that CORCO became a reality. The financing for CORCO was provided by First Boston Corporation.

== Location and business ==
The refinery is located in an 800-acre (3.2 km^{2}) site. Its proximity to the Guayanilla bay made it ideal for the bulk import/export of chemicals it produced. By 1965 the company was a major producer of toluene, benzene, and xylene.

== Regional impact ==
CORCO represented an investment of $25 million and had the capacity to refine 23,500 barrels (3,740 m^{3}) of oil daily. The economic impact in the region was felt immediately, with lower unemployment rate being registered and higher standard of living. The refinery propelled related chemical industries to build in adjacent lands, and Phillips Puerto Rico, Peerless Petrochemicals, Caribbean Gulf Refining Co., and PPG Industries added large facilities next to CORCO, providing further employment in the region. Caribe Nitrogen, Union Carbide were also located there. The company created 8,000 direct jobs.

== Demise ==
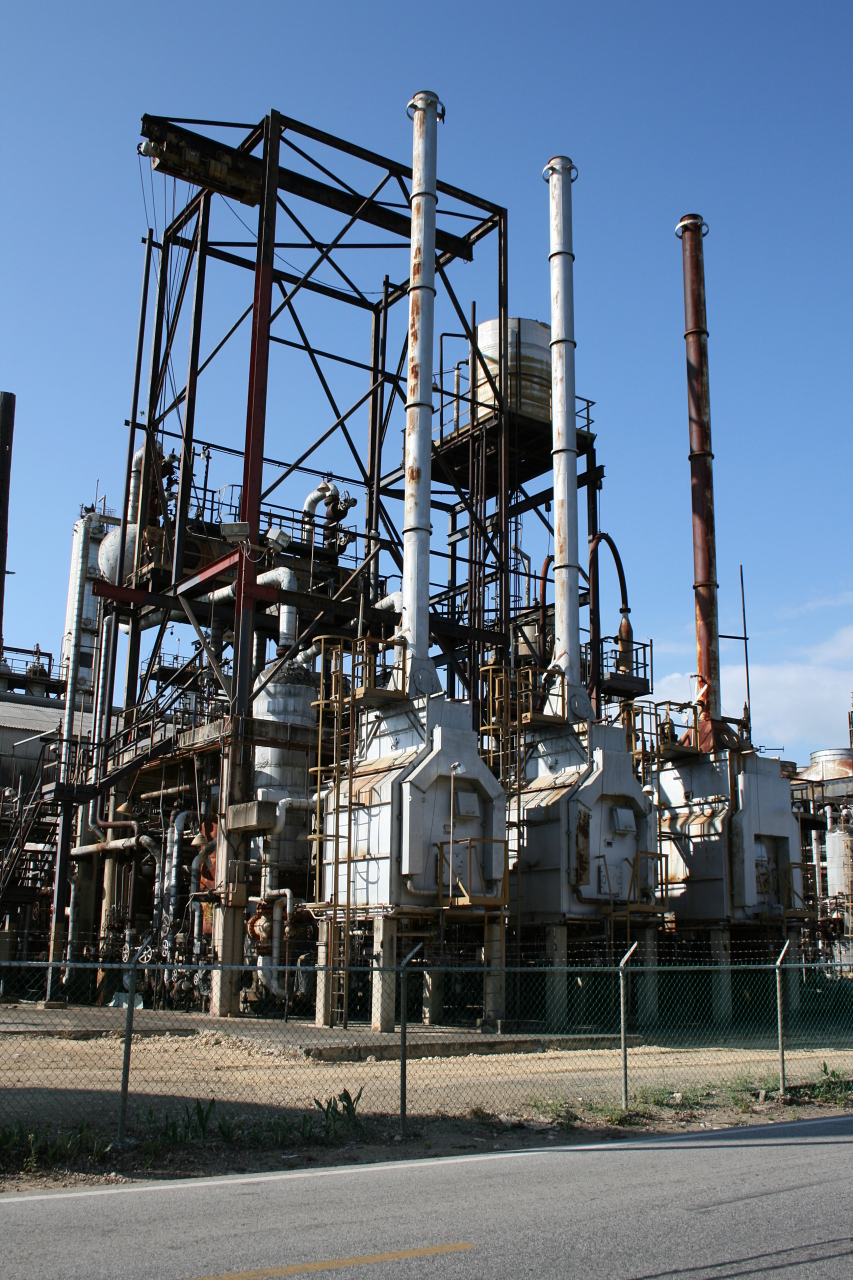
Commonwealth Oil Refining Co. (CORCO) ruins, 2009

The refinery bought most of its oil from Venezuela, and the 1973 oil embargo caused a rapid increase in the price of crude oil imports to the United States, and thus Puerto Rico. That made it difficult for the company to compete profitably against oil refineries in the US, because the American refineries were able to soften the blow of higher crude prices by purchasing domestic (American) crude. That led to a gradual closure of operations, starting in 1974. After operating under bankruptcy laws for several years, the ailing company finally shut down in March 1982, with "devastating" economic results for the region.

A restart of parts of the refinery as Arochem brought oil refining back in the late 1980s. Unfortunately a large financial fraud conducted by the executives of the company, including founder and CEO Roy William Harris, led to the dissolution of the company and shutdown of the refinery in 1991. Harris was jailed for several years.

== Recent developments ==
Today it functions as a terminal for the marine transportation and land-based storage of crude oil and petroleum products. After the refinery ceased operations, an entity called Desarrollo Integral del Sur (South Integral Development) began developing a long-term plan for the reuse of the lands and properties in the area.
