= José Victor Oliver Ledesma =

Puerto Rican industrialist (1912–2005)

- Born: 14 May 1912; Arecibo, Puerto Rico
- Died: May 20, 2005 (aged 93); Arecibo, Puerto Rico
- Occupation: Industrialist

José Victor Oliver Ledesma (14 May 1912 — 20 May 2005) was a Puerto Rican industrialist owner of Puerto Rico Distillers.

== Biography ==
Ledesma was born 14 May 1912 in Arecibo, Puerto Rico. He graduated with a degree in engineering from Cornell University in June 1936, having been excused from taking his final exams his senior year. He returned to Puerto Rico and began working as an engineer at La Central Cambalache, a sugarcane mill in Arecibo, Puerto Rico. By 1937, he held the position of Treasurer of Puerto Rico Distillers Corporation. By 1941, he was the first President of "Licoreria Roses". While at Licoreria Roses, he created a subsidiary called Ron Rico Corporation which was a pioneer in the United States rum market. Later he coordinated the merger of Ron Rico with Seagrams, and which led to the creation of Puerto Rico Distillers.

He married Blanca Miguelina Correa. He was a member of Phi Sigma Alpha fraternity.

Ledesma died on 20 May 2005 in Arecibo.
