= Oscar A. San Antonio Mendoza =

Puerto Rican politician

Member of the Puerto Rico House of Representatives from the 16th District
- In office January 2, 1985 – January 2, 1997
- Preceded by: Noel Calero Bermúdez
- Succeeded by: Elisa Juarbe Beníquez

Personal details
- Born: January 17, 1945 Isabela, Puerto Rico
- Died: May 27, 2011 (aged 66) Naples, Italy
- Party: Popular Democratic Party (PPD)
- Education: Pontifical Catholic University of Puerto Rico (BS)

Oscar A. San Antonio Mendoza was a Puerto Rican politician affiliated with the Popular Democratic Party. He served as a legislator in the Puerto Rico House of Representatives for the 16th District from 1985 till 1996. Afterwards he served as the Sergeant-at-Arms of the House of Representatives of Puerto Rico from 2001 till 2004.

He died in 2011, at the age of 66, after he was assaulted in Naples, Italy while on vacation. He underwent emergency brain surgery at the Santa Maria Loreto Mare hospital in Naples. There he was induced into a coma, but days later he lost the battle for his life. In 2016, Act 75 was passed naming road PR-466 in Isabela, Puerto Rico as Road Oscar "Cano" San Antonio Mendoza. He was a member of Phi Sigma Alpha fraternity and the Lions Clubs International as well.
