= Marco Antonio Rigau =

Puerto Rican politician

Member of the Puerto Rico Senate from the at-large district
- In office 1989–1997

Personal details
- Born: August 16, 1946 (age 80) Boston, Massachusetts, USA
- Party: Popular Democratic Party
- Education: University of Puerto Rico (BA); Harvard Law School (JD)
- Profession: Politician, Senator, Attorney

Marco Antonio Rigau Jiménez (born August 16, 1946) is a Puerto Rican-American politician and attorney affiliated to the Popular Democratic Party (PPD). He served as a member of the Senate of Puerto Rico from 1989 to 1997.

== Early years and studies ==
Marco Antonio Rigau was born on August 16, 1946, in Boston, Massachusetts.

Rigau received his bachelor's in social sciences from the University of Puerto Rico on 1965, graduating magna cum laude. He then received a second bachelor's degree in law on 1969, graduating magna cum laude again. Rigau has also studied at the Instituto Interamericano de Estudios Políticos in San José, Costa Rica, Harvard University Law School, and New York University Law School.

== Professional career ==
In 1966, Rigau worked as an assistant to United States Senator Robert F. Kennedy. He also worked as a professor at the University of Puerto Rico (1967–1969) and the Interamerican University of Puerto Rico School of Law (1970–1973). From 1970 to 1971, Rigau also worked as a law clerk to Associate Judge Héctor Martínez Muñoz.

During the 70s and 80s, Rigau worked as legal counsel to several ministers of other countries. In 1972, he worked as counsel on United States and Puerto Rico Constitutional Law to the Minister of Justice of Canada. The next year, he worked as Director of the Office of the Government of Puerto Rico in the United States. From 1973 to 1974, he served as Chairperson of the Hispanic Criminal Justice Task Force of New York and worked as counsel to the Mayor of New York City.

In 1986, Rigau worked as legal counsel to the Minister of Foreign Affairs of the Dominican Republic. The next year, he worked as counsel to the President and Minister of Justice of the Government of Haiti, during the process of drafting their current constitution and electoral laws.

In 1994, Rigau was a visiting professor of law at the University of Vigo in Spain.

Rigau is a member of Phi Sigma Alpha, Puerto Rico Bar Association, American Bar Association, and the Ateneo Puertorriqueño.

== Political career ==
Rigau was elected to the Senate of Puerto Rico at the 1988 general elections. He was reelected at the 1992 general elections. During his first term at the Senate, he presided over the Judiciary Committee.

After a few years away from political life, in 2012 he ran for the position of municipal legislator of San Juan, Puerto Rico and was elected and re-elected in the 2016 elections. He served as the majority spokesperson in the body and later as president of the municipal legislature.
