= Julio A. Santos Rivera =

Puerto Rican politician (1889–1985)

Dr. Julio A. Santos Rivera
- Born: February 9, 1889; Rincón, Puerto Rico
- Died: March 3, 1985 (aged 96)
- Occupations: Physician, politician

Julio A. Santos Rivera (February 9, 1889, Rincón, Puerto Rico – March 3, 1985) was a Puerto Rican physician, civic leader, politician, and fraternal figure closely associated with the city of Arecibo. He served in the House of Representatives of Puerto Rico and was deeply involved in public health, philanthropy, and civic organizations.

== Early life and education ==
Although born in Rincón, Santos moved to Arecibo, Puerto Rico early in life, a city he adopted as his own. He studied medicine and eventually trained in the United States, including time at the University of Mississippi.

== Fraternal involvement ==
Santos was initiated into the Phi Sigma Alpha fraternity in 1921 through the Nu Alpha Alpha Chapter in Baton Rouge, Louisiana, where he served as Secretary and Vice Chancellor. He was the founding President of the Delta Boriquén Chapter in Arecibo and supported the establishment of the Zeta Active Chapter at the Interamerican University of Puerto Rico in Arecibo. He remained an active member for decades, later joining the Capítulo Militante de Arecibo and being named an honorary member of all chapters. In 1962, he received the fraternity’s highest distinction, the Medalla de Hermano Emérito.

== Public service and leadership ==
In addition to his medical career, Santos held a wide range of public and civic roles:

- Representative in the House of Representatives of Puerto Rico (elected in 1940)
- Interim Mayor of Arecibo in 1941
- Founding member of the Arecibo Lions Club
- President of the Arecibo Rotary Club
- President of the Arecibo Hunting and Fishing Club
- President of the Arecibo Board of Benevolence
- Organizer and first director of the Public Health Unit of Arecibo
- Director of Beneficence in Ciales
- Medical inspector for the Rockefeller Foundation
- Island Director of the Puerto Rico Anti-Tuberculosis Association
- Member of the Board of Directors of the Puerto Rico Medical Association, later serving as Vice President
- President of the Northern District Medical Association
- Leader of various local fundraising campaigns, including efforts for the Red Cross

== Death ==
Dr Julio A. Santos Rivera died on March 3, 1985 at the age of 86. He was buried at Cementerio La Santa Cruz in Arecibo, Puerto Rico.
