= Moncho Loubriel =

Puerto Rican sports team equipment manager (born 1973)

Oscar Ramón “Moncho” Loubriel Flores (born September 6, 1970) is a Puerto Rican sports team supporter, property/hydration manager and mascot of Vaqueros de Bayamón and Puerto Rico men's national basketball team.

Born with Down syndrome, the youngest of four brothers, his father began taking him early on the Vaqueros games, by 1983, by then twelve or thirteen years old, he became the mascot of the team. He has traveled with the Puerto Rico men's national basketball team to numerous FIBA competitions and Olympic cycle events.

The 2022 Baloncesto Superior Nacional Season was dedicated to him. As part of Down Syndrome Awareness Month, the April 17, 2024 Vaqueros de Bayamón game was dedicated to him, it was the inaugural game of the season.

In 2016 a documentary was made about his life "El Alma del Equipo".

He is a member of Phi Sigma Alpha fraternity and he was awarded in 2012 with their Medalla de Caballero Sigma.

As a team equipment manager, Loubriel Flores appears on televised basketball games several times a year.

== See also ==
- List of Puerto Ricans
