= Union Latino Americana =

Governing body of Hispanic fraternities

- ULA
- Founded: 1932; 94 years ago New York City, New York, US
- Type: Umbrella
- Affiliation: Independent
- Status: Defunct
- Emphasis: Hispanic fraternities
- Scope: North America
- Chapters: 21 zones
- Headquarters: United States

Union Latino Americana (ULA) was a short-lived Pan American governing body of Hispanic fraternities created in the early 20th century. The ULA represented 21 Latin American countries and the United States. It operated from 1932 to 1939.

== History ==
The Union Latino Americana (ULA) was established in 1932 during a convention of Phi Iota Alpha in the New York City, New York. The ULA was a framework for the implementation of Pan-Americanism ideology.

The ULA organized Latin America into 22 zones. Each of the 21 Latin American countries constituted a zone. The 22nd zone was represented by the United States. All the zones were bound by the same constitution and internal rules and regulations.

On September 30, 1934, Sigma Delta Alpha, a fraternity established in Puerto Rico, joined the Union. It was renamed Phi Sigma Alpha zone. In September 1939, the Phi Sigma Alpha zone separated from the ULA and eventually formed the Phi Sigma Alpha Fraternity of Puerto Rico. The ULA dissolved shortly thereafter.

== Zones ==
By 1937, the ULA had several well-established and functional zones including:

- Phi Iota Alpha in United States
- Phi Kappa Alpha in Cuba
- Phi Sigma Alpha in Puerto Rico
- Phi Tau Alpha in Mexico

== See also ==
- Defunct Greek Umbrella Organizations
