= Osvaldo Rivera Cianchini =

Puerto Rican judge (c.1940–2020)

- Born: c. 1940; Coamo, Puerto Rico
- Died: December 27, 2020; San Juan, Puerto Rico
- Occupations: judge, athlete

Osvaldo Rivera Cianchini (c. 1940 – December 27, 2020) was a Puerto Rican Judge.

On January 19, 2013, he was honored with the Manuel Luciano prize given by the Asociación de Escritores de Historia Deportiva. He was a member of Phi Sigma Alpha fraternity.

He was inducted to the Pabellón de la Fama del Fondismo Puertorriqueño in 1999, and to the Pabellón de la Fama del Deporte de Coamo in 2015. He died from COVID-19 at Ashford Hospital in San Juan on December 27, 2020, at age 80.
