= Chente Ydrach =

Puerto Rican comedian

Vicente "Chente" Ydrach
- Born: Vicente Ydrach
- Occupations: Comedian; podcaster; influencer

Vicente "Chente" Ydrach (September 11, 1982) is a Puerto Rican stand-up comedian, podcaster, and social media influencer. He is known for his podcast Masacote and his comedy tours.

== Career ==
Ydrach gained recognition in Puerto Rico’s comedy circuit through his energetic and irreverent stand-up routines. His show Radical Afuego became a hit, culminating in a tour across Puerto Rico and multiple international performances in Colombia, the Dominican Republic, and the United States.

He is the creator and host of the podcast Masacote, where he interviews public figures across music, comedy, sports, and pop culture. The podcast has become a staple in Puerto Rican digital media, earning millions of views and listens through platforms like YouTube and Spotify. Ydrach was the very first personality to interview Bad Bunny during the beginning of the latter's career and the two have since remained close friends and colleagues.

Ydrach also co-hosts and produces various online shows, including iHeartRadio’s Puerto Rico vs Dominicana, which humorously compares the cultures and talents of both Caribbean nations.

== Personal life ==
In December 2022, Ydrach and his wife Verónica Cruz welcomed their first child, a son named Manuel Vicente. He is a member of Phi Sigma Alpha fraternity.

== Controversy ==
In November 2024, Ydrach faced widespread criticism for making derogatory comments about people who use wheelchairs during an episode of his podcast. He questioned why disabled individuals are allowed to skip ahead in lines at polling stations and made an inflammatory remark: "for every person that goes through, you should take two [steps] back". The comment was condemned by disability advocates, including Puerto Rican Paralympic judoka Luis Jabdiel Pérez Díaz, who emphasized the legal protections for disabled citizens. Ydrach later removed the episode and issued a public apology, stating that his comments were "ignorant and offensive".

== See also ==
- List of Puerto Ricans
