= José Guillermo Izquierdo Stella =

Puerto Rican politician & lawyer (1936–2010)

Member of the Puerto Rico Senate from the at-large district
- In office January 2, 1985 – January 2, 1992

Member of the Puerto Rico House of Representatives from the at-large district
- In office January 2, 1973 – January 1, 1977

Personal details
- Born: March 18, 1936 Caguas, Puerto Rico
- Died: September 13, 2010 (aged 74) Guaynabo, Puerto Rico
- Party: Popular Democratic Party
- Education: University of Puerto Rico (BBA); University of Puerto Rico School of Law (JD)
- Profession: Politician, lawyer

José Guillermo Izquierdo Stella was a Puerto Rican politician affiliated with the Popular Democratic Party. He served as a legislator in the Puerto Rico House of Representatives from 1973 to 1976. Afterwards he was a senator in the Senate of Puerto Rico from 1985 to 1992.

He was born in Caguas, Puerto Rico on March 18, 1936. He was the son of José R. Izquierdo and Guillermina Stella. Later he lived with his family in the Municipality of Guayanilla. He studied his primary degrees in Ponce and, later, graduated from the University of Puerto Rico with a bachelor's degree in Business Administration. He also obtained his degree in law from the University of Puerto Rico School of Law.

He was married to María Teresa San Miguel, she and Izquierdo were helicopter pilots; they had five children Teresita, José, María Elena, Jorge and María Eugenia.

From 1973 to 1977 he was the president of the Consumer Affairs Commission of the Puerto Rico House of Representatives. As a legislator he was instrumental in the creation of the Puerto Rico Department of Consumer Affairs and of the Government Ethics law of Puerto Rico. He died on September 12, 2010, he was held in the Capitol of Puerto Rico with an honor guard. He was a member of Phi Sigma Alpha fraternity.
