= Roy William Harris =

American businessman

- Occupations: Founder and Former President and CEO of Arochem (1990s)
- Known for: Collapse of the AroChem Refinery in Puerto Rico and the first Continuing Financial Crime conviction in the USA

Roy William "Will" Harris was the chief executive officer and majority shareholder of Arochem Corporation, a now defunct refinery and petrochemical plant located in Ponce, Puerto Rico, which ceased operation in 1992. Harris, a former successful commodities trader, was the central figure in United States v. Harris (1996), a case involving numerous charges of financial crimes. Harris was convicted of conspiracy to commit wire and bank fraud, money laundering, engaging in a continuing financial crimes enterprise (CFCE). Harris was the first non-drug lord ever convicted of the CFCE statute which was intended to be used on drug kingpins as a method of seizing the resources of wealthy outlaws and to deprive them of resources. The case highlighted the intricate financial fraud that led to the collapse of Arochem but also served as an essential legal precedent for issues related to the application of the CFCE statute and the role of financial institutions in fraud detection. Harris fought his convictions in various appellate courts for more than ten years through the 1990s and 2000s.

== Arochem, trading, and bank fraud ==
The Arochem Companies operated an 80,000-barrel-per-day petroleum refinery in Puerto Rico formerly known as the CORCO refinery and traded petroleum products through a credit arrangement with a consortium of banks led by Chase Manhattan Bank. Will Harris owned 60% of the stock of Arochem International Inc. and Arochem Corporation. Harris was also the sole shareholder and managing director of Arochem International Ltd. ("Limited"), based in the Cayman Islands, which engaged in trading and financing of crude oil and petroleum products. The companies, under Harris's leadership, managed a revolving credit facility with the banks that allowed them to borrow up to $245 million for their operations, secured by their oil inventories and other assets.

However, the Arochem Companies began to face significant financial difficulties starting in late 1989, and these struggles intensified throughout 1990. In response to growing losses, Harris and his executive team, including the CFO Vincent Dispenza, comptroller Dean Seniff, and other senior officers, allegedly engaged in widespread fraudulent activities to conceal the companies' true financial condition and to continue securing loans from the banks.

According to Harris's indictment (summarized):

From January 1990 to December 9, 1991, Arochem Companies submitted borrowing base reports to their lending banks, showing that the collateral securing their loans exceeded $200 million. By November 30, 1991, these reports had supported approximately $200 million in borrowed funds. However, the actual collateral held by Arochem at that time was less than $35 million. In February 1992, the lending banks filed an involuntary bankruptcy petition against Arochem in the U.S. Bankruptcy Court for the District of Connecticut, with the Chase bank group reportedly incurring losses of over $150 million on its loans to the company.

The fraudulent practices involved falsifying financial statements, manipulating oil inventory valuations, and creating fictitious contracts and documentation to inflate Arochem's profits and asset values. These misrepresentations were critical to maintaining the confidence of the banks and ensuring that Arochem could continue to access the substantial credit facilities that were essential for its operations. The company's used complex financial instruments, speculative oil trading, and fraudulent reporting to deceive its lenders. According to the Los Angeles Times,

Phony documents allegedly were created to show that Arochem had $60 million in crude oil stored in Malaysia. In another, three phony contracts allegedly were created to show purchases of $48 million in petroleum products.

According to the federal indictment (summarized):

In late 1989, Arochem Companies began experiencing severe financial struggles, with a reported deficit by early 1990 between $60 to $65 million. During a meeting among key officers, Seniff disclosed the deficit and, alongside Dispenza, discussed plans to inflate Arochem's financial statements by overstating its crude oil inventory. It was also noted that Arochem would likely fail Ernst & Young's upcoming year-end audit unless it generated substantial earnings by May 1990. Harris directed further "creative" approaches to the financial reporting to address the audit requirements.

In anticipation of the audit, Harris, Dispenza, and Seniff devised a plan involving manipulated asset valuations. Harris supplied Dispenza with a contract for crude oil purchases from Trieast Marketing, which, despite no actual transfer of oil, was intended to falsely enhance Arochem's inventory and profit figures. This led to the creation of fabricated documents, such as warehouse receipts and titles, to give the appearance of a fulfilled contract. Even with these adjustments, the companies showed a remaining $25 million deficit. In response, Seniff, with Harris and Dispenza's knowledge, removed accounts payable records totaling $25 million. When Ernst & Young sought evidence of payment for this amount, Harris advised Dispenza to handle it however necessary, leading to document alterations indicating the payment had been made, thereby boosting year-end income by $25 million.

The altered financials presented in Arochem's 1990 year-end report showed $13 million in retained earnings and a $3.3 million profit, overstating Arochem's financial standing by about $60 million. Ernst & Young's audit, based on this false data, concluded with an unqualified financial opinion, which was then presented to Arochem's banks.

Financial misrepresentations persisted through late 1990, with manipulated reports indicating earnings overstated by $106 million due to additional losses. By March 1991, as Arochem faced another impending audit, Dispenza received fraudulent contract documents from Harris. These included fictitious letters of credit and sham contracts purporting oil cargo payments. The false contracts inflated Arochem's assets by $47 million and profits by $11 million, resulting in another unqualified opinion from Ernst & Young at the 1991 audit, which was also sent to Arochem's banks.

Harris was accused of wiring $3.7 million to his personal bank account in the indictment.

Arochem's assets were to be sold to a new buyer, but the refinery closed permanently in December 1991 according to the US Department of Energy. The employees were terminated and the Arochem site today is an EPA Superfund cleanup site.

== Legal proceedings and trial ==
After rejecting a plea deal that would have earned Harris a maximum 3-year sentence, on September 9, 1992, Harris was indicted on multiple charges, including conspiracy to commit wire and bank fraud, money laundering, and engaging in a continuing financial crimes enterprise. The indictment also included charges related to the submission of false statements on loan applications. The government's case against Harris rested on the assertion that he and other Arochem executives had engaged in a deliberate scheme to defraud the company's creditors by falsifying financial information, manipulating inventory reports, and conducting illegal financial transactions to disguise the company's deteriorating financial health.

The indictment listed 24 counts, and the government sought the forfeiture of Harris's assets under 18 U.S.C. § 982, which allows for the confiscation of property involved in money laundering and other financial crimes. Harris moved to dismiss several counts and sought to sever the charge related to making a false statement on a loan application. The district court granted his motion to sever the loan-related charge but denied his motion to dismiss the remaining counts of wire fraud, bank fraud, and the CFCE charge.

After Harris rejected a plea bargain that would have earned him a maximum three-year sentence, a New York jury convicted him in December 1992 of engineering a scheme to defraud the bank consortium. Prosecutors identified false financial documents and sham contracts, as well as accounting ledgers doctored to overvalue the companies' oil inventory and hide its large losses. He was convicted on all counts. On December 14, 1992, the jury found Harris guilty, and he was sentenced to 188 months (approximately 15 years) of imprisonment, along with a five-year term of supervised release. The court also ordered Harris to pay $200 million in restitution to the banks that had been defrauded.

Harris forfeited his assets and reported to prison in August 1993. U.S. District Judge Charles S. Haight sentenced him to 15 years, 8 months, including a 10-year minimum under the recent "Kingpin Act" law. Harris argued for a lesser sentence on the grounds that he suffered a gambling disorder, but courts rejected the claim.

== The first application of the CFCE statute ==
One of the central issues on appeal was the conviction under the Continuing Financial Crimes Enterprise (CFCE) statute, codified at 18 U.S.C. § 225. The CFCE statute was designed to target individuals who engage in ongoing financial criminal enterprises that generate substantial illicit profits. Under the statute, the government must prove that the defendant organized or managed a group of individuals who committed at least three separate financial crimes and received at least $5 million in gross receipts during a two-year period.

Harris argued that his conviction under the CFCE statute violated the Ex Post Facto Clause of the U.S. Constitution, as some of the conduct that formed the basis of the conviction occurred before the CFCE statute's enactment in November 1990. The appellate court rejected this argument, affirming the principle that in cases involving continuing offenses, conduct occurring both before and after the enactment of the statute can be considered in determining guilt. The court found that the jury had been properly instructed to consider only post-enactment conduct in its determination of guilt under the CFCE statute.

== Appealing of United States v. Harris ==
On appeal, Harris contended that the money laundering charge should have been dismissed because the transfers of funds within the United States—specifically from New York to Connecticut—were the key transactions designed to conceal the fraud, rather than the subsequent transfers to Switzerland. The appellate court disagreed; it ruled that the domestic and international transfers were part of a single transaction aimed at concealing the proceeds of fraud. Thus, the money laundering conviction was upheld. Evidence at court showed that Harris had moved $7.5 million of Arochem money to an account that he controlled in Switzerland.

The district court's imposition of a $200 million restitution order was another point of Harris's appeal. He argued that the court had failed to properly consider his financial needs, his earning potential, and the impact of the restitution order on his dependents. The appellate court found that while the district court had considered Harris's future earning potential, it had not adequately addressed his obligations to his dependents. As a result, the court vacated the restitution order and remanded the case for further consideration of Harris's financial circumstances in light of the statutory requirements for restitution.

The United States v. Harris case is notable for its contributions to the legal understanding of financial fraud, money laundering, and the application of the CFCE statute. Several key principles emerged from the case, influencing future prosecutions of complex financial crimes:

1. The Continuing Nature of Financial Crimes: The appellate court's ruling affirmed that the Ex Post Facto Clause does not prohibit the prosecution of ongoing financial crimes that began before the enactment of relevant statutes but continued afterward. This principle is critical in prosecuting complex schemes that span multiple years and involve numerous fraudulent acts.
2. Multiplicity of Charges in Financial Fraud Cases: The court's decision to uphold multiple counts of bank fraud based on separate extensions of the loan agreement reinforced the notion that each act of fraud can be treated as a distinct offense if it involves new misrepresentations or actions that deceive creditors or financial institutions. This approach is essential in cases where defendants engage in long-term fraudulent activities that require repeated misstatements to maintain the scheme.
3. Concealment and Money Laundering: The court's ruling on the money laundering charge clarified the scope of the statute, confirming that domestic and international transfers can be treated as part of a single laundering scheme when designed to conceal the proceeds of fraud. This ruling has implications for how financial institutions and prosecutors approach cases involving the movement of funds across borders to hide unlawful gains.
4. Restitution in Large-Scale Fraud Cases: The appellate court's decision to vacate the restitution order underscored the importance of considering a defendant's financial needs and obligations when imposing restitution. While courts aim to ensure that victims are compensated, they must also balance this goal with the practical reality of the defendant's ability to pay.

Regarding CFCE, Harris's appeal did place effort on CFCE to be treated similarly to RICO in being constitutionally vague (which had been successfully litigated in a previous case). However, the appellate Federal Judge Charles Haight Jr. responded in his decision:

Viewing the case in this light, I conclude that the continuing financial crimes enterprise statute gave defendant adequate warning that the charged conduct would fall within its terms. The statute reaches one who "organizes, manages or supervises" the enterprise.

And further that:

RICO's component parts are differently worded from the continuing financial crimes enterprise statute. Arguably RICO's provisions are more vulnerable to constitutional attack for vagueness, although it must be remembered that Justice Scalia wrote for a minority of the Court in H.J. Justice Brennan's opinion commanded a majority of five and contained no murmurings about constitutionality. In any event, subsequent to H.J. the Second Circuit in Coonan sustained the constitutionality of the RICO statute against a vagueness challenge.

Harris's legal team also tried to use that the CFCE law was focused on drug king pins as a means to appeal, arguing that other financial crimes were different in nature. The appellate judge Haight ruled that:

I find nothing to comfort defendant in all of this. Just as 21 U.S.C. § 848 is a "regulation" of the business of selling drugs, so 18 U.S.C. § 225 is a "regulation" of doing business with financial institutions. In particular, the statute is intended to "regulate" that business by safeguarding such institutions from theft or fraud.

The appeals process for Harris provided ended with failure over a 10-year period.
