= Guillermo A. Baralt =

Puerto Rican historian 1948-

Guillermo A. Baralt (born 1948) is a Puerto Rican historian. He obtained his bachelor's degree from Duquesne University in 1970. Later he continued his studies in the University of Chicago where he earned his Master's and Doctor's degrees. He is currently professor of History at the University of Puerto Rico at Rio Piedras. He is a member of Phi Sigma Alpha fraternity.

== Selected works authored ==
- Azúcar y esclavitud en Toa Baja : la conspiración de esclavos 26 de Marzo de 1843. Toa Baja, P.R.: Municipio de Toa Baja. (1983)
- Yauco, o, Las minas de oro cafetaleras (1756-1898). San Juan, Puerto Rico: n.i. (1984)
- Buena Vista: estancia de frutos menores, fábrica de harinas y hacienda cafetalera. San Juan, PR: Fideicomisio de Conservacion de Puerto Rico. (1988)
- Tradición de Futuro: un siglo de historia del Banco Popular de Puerto Rico. Hato Rey, P.R.: Banco Popular de Puerto Rico. (1993)
- La razón del equilibrio: La vida de Luis A. Ferré, 1968-1998, Vol. II. (1996)
- Desde el mirador de Prospero: La vida de Luis A. Ferré, 1904-1968, Vol. I. San Juan: Fundación el Nuevo Día. (1997)
- La vida de Luis A. Ferré : la razón del equilibrio. San Juan, P.R.: Fundación El Nuevo Día. (1998)
- La Historia de El Nuevo Dia (1909-2000): "Al servicio de mi tierra". Hato Rey, P.R.: Publicaciones Puertorriqueñas. (2002)
- Historia del Tribunal Federal en Puerto Rico, 1899-1999. Hato Rey, P.R.: Publicaciones Puertorriqueñas. (2004)
- Esclavos rebeldes : conspiraciones y sublevaciones de esclavos en Puerto Rico (1795-1873). Río Piedras, P.R.: Ediciones Huracán. (2006)
- Si es Goya tiene que ser bueno: 75 años de historia. San Juan, P.R.: Editorial Revés. (2011)
- La Gran Tarea la Obra de Gobierno de Luis A. Ferré, 1969-1972. San Juan, P.R.: n.i. (2011)

A significant number of his works have been translated into English.
