= Hugo David Storer Tavarez =

Puerto Rican industrialist

- Born: March 8, 1908; Utuado, Puerto Rico
- Died: June 28, 1994 (aged 86); Guaynabo, Puerto Rico
- Education: University of Puerto Rico, Río Piedras Campus
- Occupation: industrialist
- Employer: Commonwealth Oil Refining Company
- Known for: Bonsai expert and founder of Phi Sigma Alpha

Hugo David Storer Tavarez (March 8, 1908 – June 28, 1994) was a Puerto Rican oil industrialist, horticulturalist, and writer. He was a founder of the Commonwealth Oil Refining Company He was also a founder of Phi Sigma Alpha fraternity and started the Horticultural Society of Puerto Rico and Club Bonsai de P.R.

== Early life ==
Storer Tavarez was born March 8, 1908, in Utuado, Puerto Rico. While a student at University of Puerto Rico, Río Piedras Campus, Storer Tavaarez and other students founded what was to become Phi Sigma Alpha fraternity on October 22, 1928. He was later the sixteenth president of Phi Sigma Alpha fraternity, serving in 1948, 1949, 1951, and 1963.

== Career ==
By 1954, Storer Tavaarez was the Director of Promotion of the Puerto Rico Economic Development Administration also known as Fomento. He was one of the founders of the Commonwealth Oil Refining Company. He was named director of the Puerto Rico Tourism Bureau on July 1, 1953.

== Personal life ==
He became interested in horticulture after visiting the Brooklyn Botanical Garden in the late 1940s. In 1970, Storer Tavaarez founded and was the first president of the Horticultural Society of Puerto Rico. In July 1977, he organized a group that would later be called Club Bonsai de Puerto Rico to promote bonsai to all corners of the island. He was known as the "first person of bonsai" in Puerto Rico.

In 1977, he was the editor of the book Catalogo Filatelico de Puerto Rico (Philatelic Catalog of Puerto Rico) for the Sociedad Filatelica de Puerto Rico. He also wrote articles that were published in Bonsai: Akadama, Alnus Glutinosa, Bonsai Aesthetics, Bonsai Cultivation and Care, Bonsai Slovakia, Bonsai Styles, Deadwood Bon (University Press, 2014, ISBN 978-1230561509).

He died on June 28, 1994 in Guaynabo, Puerto Rico.

== See also ==
- List of Puerto Ricans
