= Bartolomé Bonet Fussá =

Puerto Rican politician (1909–1990)

Member of the Puerto Rico Senate from the Mayagüez district
- In office February 15, 1944 – March 24, 1944

Personal details
- Born: 14 April 1909 Rincón, Puerto Rico
- Died: 16 November 1990 (aged 81) San Juan, Puerto Rico
- Party: Popular Democratic Party (PPD)
- Spouse: Palmira Cedó de Bonet
- Children: 4
- Profession: Senator, psychiatrist, public servant
- Known for: Member of Senate of Puerto Rico (1944) for Mayagüez; leader in mental health administration

Bartolomé Bonet Fussá (April 14, 1909 – November 16, 1990) was a Puerto Rican psychiatrist, public servant, and politician. He served in 1944 as a senator for the Mayagüez district in the Senate of Puerto Rico and played significant roles in mental health administration and municipal governance.

== Early life and education ==
Bonet Fussá was born on April 14, 1909, in Rincón, Puerto Rico, to Domingo Bonet Santos and María Eugenia Fussá Vargas. He married Palmira Cedó de Bonet, with whom he had four children, including Bartolomé Jr., Luis Oscar, Darío, and Domingo (died in childhood).

== Political career ==
From 1941 to 1944, Bonet Fussá served as a member of the Municipal Assembly of Mayagüez. In February 1944, he was appointed as interim senator for the Mayagüez District (District IV), filling in after his father's resignation; he then resigned himself later that year, serving until March 24, 1944. During his brief term, he chaired the Commission on Imprints and Registered Laws and was a member of the Commissions on Appointments; Agriculture, Industry & Commerce; Insular and Municipal Government & Elections; and Health & Welfare.

== Professional and public service ==
Bonet Fussá earned a medical degree with a specialization in mental health. He served as Executive Director of the Alcoholism Control Program and the Alcohol Information Center within Puerto Rico's Department of Health. He later led the Alcoholism Program at the Psychiatric Hospital of the Medical Center.

He was an active member of the Phi Sigma Alpha fraternity, joining its Beta chapter.

== Later life and death ==
The Bonet Fussá family relocated to the San Juan metropolitan area in 1950, residing in University Gardens in Río Piedras before eventually settling in Santurce. Bartolomé Bonet Fussá died on November 16, 1990, in San Juan, at the age of 81.
