= Manuel Abreu Castillo =

Puerto Rican lawyer

President of the Puerto Rico Bar Association

Personal details
- Born: January 30, 1927 Isabela, Puerto Rico
- Died: December 18, 1969 San Juan, Puerto Rico

Manuel Abreu-Castillo was a lawyer who, as the youngest President of the Puerto Rico Bar Association led a delegation of 11 lawyers from Puerto Rico who joined the August 1963 March on Washington for Jobs and Freedom, at which Martin Luther King Jr. gave his famous "I Have a Dream" speech.

He was elected president of the Colegio de Abogados de Puerto Rico in 1959, a position he held until 1961 and again from 1962 to 1964. During Abreu's term as Bar president, he was active in the Interamerican Lawyers Federation and served as the organization's liaison with Dr. Arturo Morales Carrión, at the time the Assistant Deputy Secretary of State for Latin American Affairs at the United States State Department. He also fought to guarantee the fiscal autonomy of Puerto Rico's Judicial Branch. He was a member of Phi Sigma Alpha fraternity having joined via the Alpha chapter.
