= Edgar Belaval =

American lawyer

Edgar Franklin S. Belaval (1910–1989) was an Attorney General of Puerto Rico and co-founder of the law firm Francis & Belaval. He presented several cases before the United States Court of Appeals for the First Circuit, including a Second Amendment to the United States Constitution gun case in 1942. The 1942 case was the first lower court attempt to redefine Supreme Court decisions on the Second Amendment.

Belaval graduated from the University of Virginia, where he was a member of the lacrosse team in 1930 and 1931. Belaval married Domitila Domenech, Ph.D., an early developer of Planned Parenthood in Puerto Rico, whose name graces the Audio Visual Resource Center at the University of Puerto Rico where she taught from 1933 to 1978.

Belaval's father, Joseph S. Belaval, was president of the Puerto Rico Board of Health and a controversial advocate for sterilization and birth control.

== Selected cases ==
- Porto Rico Tel. Co. v. Puerto Rico Communications Authority (1951)
- Cases v. United States (1942)
- Ramirez-Pabon v. Board of Personnel of Puerto Rico (1958)
