= William Riefkohl =

Puerto Rican businessman

- Born: October 8, 1939 (age 86); Río Piedras, Puerto Rico
- Education: University of Puerto Rico (BA, MPA); University of Puerto Rico School of Law (JD)
- Occupation: industrialist
- Spouse: Zoraida Biaggi
- Children: 2

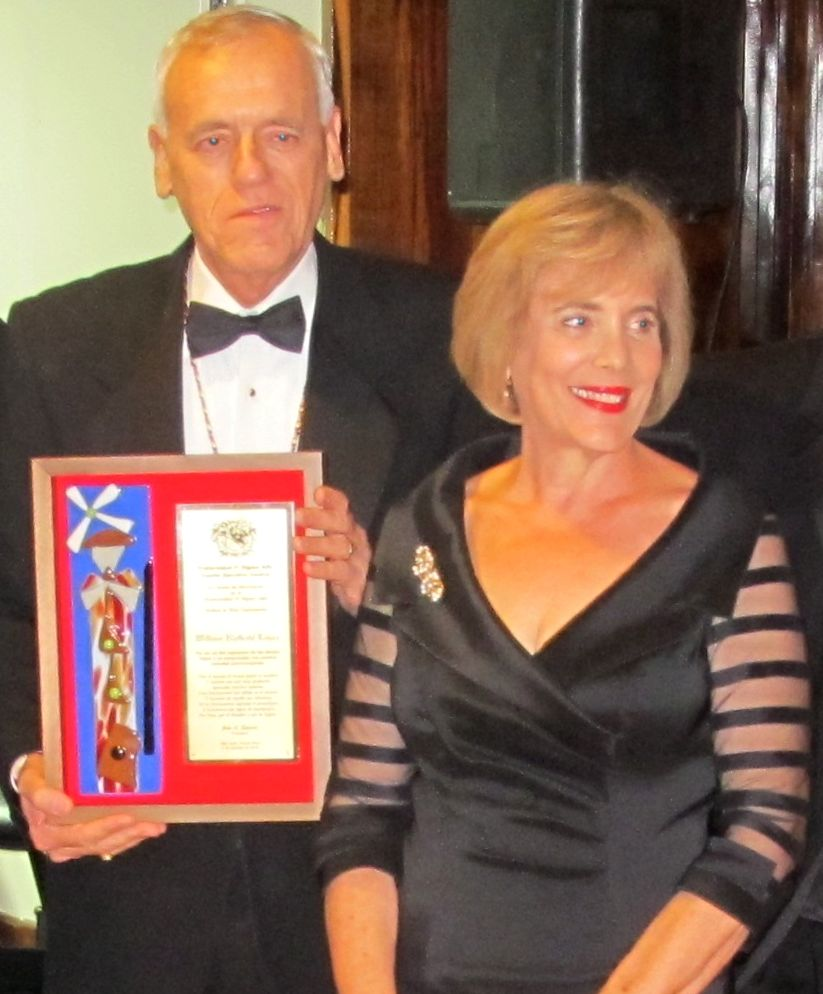
William Riefkohl to the left, with a plaque stating the 2010 Sigma convention was dedicated to him

William Riefkohl López (born October 8, 1939) was the executive director of the Puerto Rico Manufacturers Association 2002–2013.

== Early life ==
William Riefkohl was born in Rio Piedras, Puerto Rico, to William Riefkohl Villodas from Patillas and Monsita López Ramírez from Canóvanas. He earned three degrees form the University of Puerto Rico, Rio Piedras Campus: Bachelors in Arts, Masters in Public Administration and a Juris Doctor. In 1963 he joined the Alfa Activo chapter of Phi Sigma Alpha fraternity, and was later its Chancellor.

== Career ==
Riefkohl worked at the Puerto Rico Economic Development Administration (Fomento) first as Industrial Promotions Officer (1968 to 1970) and later as legal aide (1970 to 1972). He was subsequently named executive assistant to the administrator, and director of the Office of European Promotions from 1974 to 1977. After Fomento, Riefkohl joined the University of Puerto Rico at Bayamón as a member of its faculty from 1977 to 1985 and from 1993 to 1994 where he taught social sciences, international organizations, legislative process, government of Puerto Rico and of the United States. In 1971 he wrote the book: "Política pública del gobierno de Puerto Rico en torno a la planificación de la industria del turismo y su relación con la crisis actual de esa industria".

From 1988 to 1992 Riefkohl acted as the sub administrator of the Puerto Rico Economic Development Administration. During this time he coordinated promotional activities at Fomento offices outside Puerto Rico and established commercial contacts with a number of international companies. He restructured the international promotions of Fomento in Europe and Asia and established the Office of Promotions and Inversions in Brussels, Belgium. He facilitated the creation of the Institute of Science and Technology. Furthermore, he restructured the strategies to develop Puerto Rico as a center for services for the Caribbean. During this time at Fomento the effort to develop Puerto Rico as an international center for cinematographic filming began.

From 2001 to 2002 he was the executive director of the Puerto Rico Industrial Development Company, excelling in establishing industrial conglomerates or clusters as starts to the future industrial development of Puerto Rico. In 2002 he returned to the Puerto Rico Manufacturers Association as its executive vice president.

Currently at the Puerto Rico Manufacturers Association, Riefkohl serves as its chief executive officer, where he oversees the fulfillment of its constitution, rules, and resolutions. Among his other responsibilities are recommending public policy to the board of directors of the association and ensuring the execution of the association's strategic plans. He is also a frequent legislative lobbyist of the economic development of Puerto Rico and he carries out an extensive and intensive public hearings program.

== Awards ==
William Riefkohl has received the Public Servant of the Year award in 1991 by the Puerto Rican Products Association, in 2002 Distinguished Citizen by the Cement Producers of Puerto Rico Association, in 2004 Distinguished Citizen by the Puerto Rico Export Council, in 2006 the "Caballero Sigma" medal by Phi Sigma Alpha fraternity. In 2010 Phi Sigma Alpha fraternity dedicated their annual convention to him.

== Personal life ==
He is married to Zoraida Biaggi and they have two children Rebecca and Etienne.

== See also ==
- List of Puerto Ricans
- German immigration to Puerto Rico
