= Eugenio S. Belaval =

Puerto Rican politician and professor

- Born: November 13, 1925; Santurce, Puerto Rico
- Died: August 21, 1999 (aged 73); San Juan, Puerto Rico
- Education: University of Puerto Rico (BBA); University of Puerto Rico School of Law (LL.B.); Harvard School of Law (LL.M.)
- Known for: New Progressive Party or New Party for Progress (NPP) member of the Puerto Rico House of Representatives
- Spouse: Virginia Tranum
- Children: 4
- Scientific career
- Fields: Mercantile law
- Institutions: University of Puerto Rico School of Law

Eugenio Belaval-Martínez (November 15, 1925 – August 21, 1999) was a mercantile law professor at the University of Puerto Rico School of Law, a New Progressive Party or New Party for Progress (NPP) member of the Puerto Rico House of Representatives and the NPP's Electoral Commissioner.

Born on November 13, 1925, in Santurce, Puerto Rico, of a prominent family in Fajardo, Puerto Rico, his father was Eugenio Belaval-Maldonado and his mother was Olimpia Martínez Conroy. He married Virginia Tranum, (1924-2004) of German ancestry, who later became Deputy Secretary of Puerto Rico's Department of Education. They had four sons. He died on August 21, 1999, at the age of 73.

During his studies at the University of Puerto Rico, he became a member of the Phi Sigma Alpha fraternity, based in San Juan, Puerto Rico.

As the NPP's Electoral Commission, he represented the party's interests, as well as those of his party's nominee for the Senate from the Humacao Senatorial District, Francisco Estrada Bibiloni, in the recount held by a special committee of the Senate of Puerto Rico in the spring of 1977 that resulted in the certification of the Popular Party's candidate, Jesús Santa Aponte.

He was the author of the book Por qué, qué y cuando creer, published in 1995, among others.
