= Joseph S. Belaval =

Puerto Rican obstetrician

- Born: 1879
- Died: 1953 (aged 73–74)
- Known for: Influential advocate for birth control and sterilization programs for impoverished women in Puerto Rico
- Medical career
- Field: Obstetrics
- Institutions: Board of Health of Puerto Rico

Joseph "Jose" S. Belaval (1879–1953) was a Puerto Rican obstetrician, who was an influential advocate for birth control and sterilization programs for impoverished women in Puerto Rico. Belaval served on the Board of Health of Puerto Rico from 1917 to 1938, becoming the board president in 1920. In 1934, Belaval was appointed director of the first birth control clinic in Puerto Rico.

He was appointed to the Board of Health following his published writings advocating birth control in the early 1900s. Belaval's writings were considered controversial because they were aimed at limiting the poor population in Puerto Rico, and because Puerto Rico's predominantly Catholic population opposed any type of birth control.

A not-for-profit community hospital in Santurce, Puerto Rico bears his name.

His son, Edgar Belaval, was Attorney General of Puerto Rico.
