= Luis Fernando Pumarada O'Neill =

Puerto RIcan engineer and academic

- Born: May 30, 1943 (age 82); Rio Piedras, Puerto Rico
- Education: University of Puerto Rico at Mayagüez, BS 1966 Columbia University, M.Arch. 1969 Northwestern University, Ph.D. 1986
- Occupations: Historian, engineer, academic
- Known for: Co-founder of CoHemis; publications on Puerto Rican industrial history

Luis Fernando Pumarada O'Neill (born May 30, 1943) is a Puerto Rican engineer, historian, and academic known for his contributions to the history of engineering and industrial heritage in Puerto Rico. He is also a co-founder of CoHemis, a hemispheric center for education and applied science collaboration.

== Education ==
Born at Rio Piedras, Puerto Rico, on May 30, 1943, Luis Pumarada completed his early education in San Juan and Rio Piedras. He earned a bachelor's degree in engineering from the University of Puerto Rico at Mayagüez (RUM) in 1966. While at the university, he joined the Beta chapter of the Phi Sigma Alpha fraternity in 1963.

He obtained a master's degree from Columbia University in architectural technology in 1969 and a Ph.D. from Northwestern University in urban systems and policy planning in 1986.

== Career ==
Pumarada was an engineering professor at the University of Puerto Rico at Mayaguez from 1978 to 2005. In the university, he was a founding member of CoHemis in 1991, a hemispheric collaboration center based at the University of Puerto Rico at Mayagüez. By 1994, the organization had grown to include nineteen institutions from eleven countries, promoting cooperation in engineering and applied science research. He also represented the center in international delegations, including technical visits to most Latin American nations.

He had other interests, professional and social. He played an active role in Puerto Rico's basketball community, playing for the national team in 1965 and serving as apoderado (manager) for the BSN professional basketball team Atléticos de San Germán in 1977. Moreover, he volunteered his time as coach to teams of underprivileged youth in San Germán. He was an active member of the Puerto Rican Socialist Party in the 1970s, and was a victim of the political prosecution carried out by the FBI and the Puerto Rican Police that took the shape of illegal surveillance.

Pumarada wrote articles related to sports and politics for the newspaper Claridad under the pen name Americo León. He was also founder and first president and of a non-profit corporation for the study, exploration and conservation of caves in western Puerto Rico (Sociedad Avance Espeleológico, Inc.), and in this capacity helped in the mapping of one of the largest caves in the region, the Cueva del Viento, among many others.

In 1992, he founded and industrial archeology firm Arqueología Industrial de Puerto Rico that did consultant work as a means to preserve the industrial heritage of the island by making sure that industrial archaeological remains were documented and treated according to national and federal legislation.

== Publications ==
He co-authored engineering publications, including work on reinforced concrete repair. He authored several books focused on Puerto Rican industrial and engineering history, including:

- La Carretera Central, un viaje escénico a la historia de Puerto Rico (Puerto Rico's Carretera Central, a Scenic Trip through History). Has an English language section. Oficina Estatal de Preservación Histórica, San Juan, 1997. 92 pages, illus. (with María de los Angeles Castro-Arroyo).
- Los túneles de San Germán: del abovedado a las leyendas ("The San Germán tunnels: from vaults to legends"). With the collaboration of Edwin Albino and Yesenia Pumarada. Has an English language section. Oficina Estatal de Preservación Histórica, San Juan, 1996. 84 pages, illus.
- Los puentes históricos de Puerto Rico ("Puerto Rico's Historic Bridges"), Mayaguez Campus Research and Development Center, Mayaguez, 1991. 168 pages, illus.
- La Industria Cafetalera de Puerto Rico, 1736-1969 ("The Puerto Rican Coffee Industry, 1736-1969"), Mayaguez Campus Research and evelopment Center, Mayaguez, 1990. 204 pages, illus. (2 editions).
- La central azucarera en Puerto Rico (1898-1952), Volumen I: Contexto histórico y tipología de sus elementos. San Juan: Oficina de Conservación Histórica.
- Imágenes de Arqueología Industrial de Puerto Rico ("Images from Puerto Rico's Industrial Archeology"). Oficina Estatal de Preservación Histórica, San Juan, 1996. CD-ROM produced by LARSIP, UPR-Mayagüez, 800 color slides.
- Breve Historia de las Obras de Ingenieria de Puerto Rico ("A Short History of the Engineering Works of Puerto Rico"), Colegio de Ingenieros y Agrimensores, San Juan, Puerto Rico, 1982.
