= Enrique Rodríguez Negrón =

Member of Senate of Puerto Rico

Member of the Puerto Rico Senate from the at-large district
- In office 1989–2001

Personal details
- Born: July 14, 1933 Toa Alta, Puerto Rico
- Died: November 24, 2022 (age 89) Green Cove Springs, Florida
- Party: New Progressive Party (PNP)
- Spouse: Margarita Rodríguez
- Children: Maureen, Richard, Derrick and Marlene
- Occupation: Politician, Senator, Attorney, Entrepreneur, Statesman, and Veteran.
- Profession: Attorney

Military service
- Allegiance: United States of America
- Branch/service: United States Air Force
- Rank: Airman First Class

Enrique Rodríguez Negrón (born July 14, 1933, in Toa Alta, Puerto Rico) served as a member of the Senate of Puerto Rico from 1989 to 2001. From 1993 to 2001, he chaired the Senate Tourism Committee and partnered with then executive director of the Puerto Rico Tourism Company Luis Fortuño in advancing the tourism and economic legislative agenda of the administration of Governor Pedro Rosselló. During Senate Judiciary Committee hearings regarding the 1978 Cerro Maravilla events, Rodríguez Negrón was an outspoken defender of former Governor Carlos Romero Barceló.

Prior to his legislative service, Rodríguez Negrón served as a Superior Court judge, as President of the Puerto Rico Industrial Development Company, as well as State Director for the federal Farmers Home Administration, one of a few Puerto Ricans to have served in prominent positions in all three branches of government, as well as in the Federal government.

Enrique Rodríguez Negrón was an attorney, judge developer and a Korean War era United States Air Force veteran. He died on November 24, 2022, in Green Cove Springs, Florida, at age 89. He was buried at the Jacksonville National Cemetery.
