= Puerto Rico Manufacturers Association =

Trade association

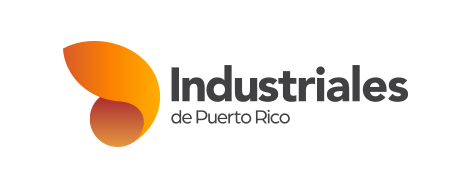
- Founded: 1928 (98 years ago)
- Type: trade association
- Purpose: manufacturing and service industry
- Location: Guaynabo, Puerto Rico
- Region served: Puerto Rico
- Website: www.prma.com

The Puerto Rico Manufacturers Association (PRMA) —Spanish: Asociación de Industriales de Puerto Rico— is a private, non-profit, and voluntary trade association in Puerto Rico formed with the intent of joining the manufacturing and service industries of Puerto Rico in the same organization. The Association was established in 1928 before Operation Bootstrap and was the entity that suggested the creation of the Puerto Rico Industrial Development Company (PRIDCO).

== History ==
The PRMA was established in 1928 but it didn't incorporate until June 26, 1931. In 1939 it suggested the creation of the Puerto Rico Industrial Development Company (PRIDCO) to promote the economic development of Puerto Rico.

In 1973, the association adopted a format that allows manufacturers to talk directly with different government representatives through a caucus.

Today, the association remains one of the most prominent trade associations in Puerto Rico as it is the largest association that groups manufacturers on the island. (Note: Gómez (2014; in Spanish) "Este instrumento de medición, [el Índice de Gerentes de Compras de la Manufactura,] similar al que se utiliza en Estados Unidos para los mismos fines, se trabaja sobre entrevistas a gerentes de compras de empresas manufactureras con más de 50 empleos que son miembros de la Asociación de Industriales de Puerto Rico.") (Note: Cortés (2014; in Spanish) "Los métodos de mi gobierno han sido de mucha más apertura. Tanto con la prensa como con los distintos grupos. Yo me he reunido con la Asociación de Industriales, con los del Centro Unido de Detallistas, igual que con líderes obreros, sin límites de tiempo.")

== Presidents ==
#	President	Years
1	Lupercio Colberg	1928-30
2	Nathaniel Pasarell	1931
3	Santos Zubillaga	1932-38
4	Gabriel de la Haba	1939
5	J.A.E. Rodríguez	1940-51
6	Ángel Suárez	1952
7	Juan Suárez	1953-54
8	Antonio Rodríguez Géigel	1955-56
9	Enrique Castillo	1957-59
10	Sabino Valdés	1960-61
11	Alfonso Valdés	1962
12	Robert P. McQueeny	1963-64
13	Antonio Luis Ferré	1965-66
14	Sergio Camero	1967-68
15	Augusto N. Durand	1968
16	Hiram D. Cabassa	1969-70
17	Arturo Díaz Jr.	1971-72
18	Peter E. Martínez	1972
19	Rafael Cebollero	1972-74
20	Ramón B. Rodríguez	1974-76
21	Herminio M. Brau	1977
22	Danol A. Morales	1978-79
23	Ernesto A. Castillo	1980-81
24	Francisco M. Rexach Jr.	1982-83
25	Vicente Dordal	1984-85
26	Manuel Borrero	1985-87
27	Rubén Vélez Lebrón	1987-89
28	Manuel Luis del Valle	1989-91
29	Daniel Lebrón Pitre	1991-93
30	Bartolomé Gamundi	1993-95
31	Mario S. Belaval	1995
32	Samuel Landol Carrero	1995-96
33	Enrique Cortés	1996-98
34	Miguel Nazario	1998–2000
35	Lucy Crespo	2000–2002
36	Manuel Cidre	2002–2004
37	Reynaldo Encarnación	2004–2006
38	Edgardo Fábregas	2006–2008
39	Josen Rossi	2008–2010
40	Pedro Watlington	2010–2012
41	Waleska Rivera	2012–2014
42	Carlos Rivera-Velez	2015-2016
43	Rodrigo Masses-Artze	2016–2019
44	Carlos M. Rodríguez	2019-2022
45	Eric Santiago Justiniano	2022-Present

== Executive Directors ==
	Executive Directors / Executive Vice Presidents	Years
1	Héctor Martínez Rigau	Beginning-1962
2	Miguel Calzada Matta	1962–1963
3	Ramón F. Calderón	1963–1964
4	Amadeo I.D. Francis	1964–1973
5	Héctor Jiménez Juarbe	1973–1998
6	William Riefkohl	1998–2001
7	Jorge Berlingeri	2001–2002
8	William Riefkohl	2002–2012
9	Jaime L. García	2013-2015
10	Francisco García	2015–2018
11	Yandia Pérez	2020-Present
