= Gaspar Rivera Cestero =

American politician

Gaspar Rivera Cestero (born in 1912) was a lawyer and a former member of the Puerto Rican state legislature.

He graduated with a juris doctor from the University of Puerto Rico School of Law. He was a member of Phi Sigma Alpha fraternity.

He was admitted to the Commonwealth of Puerto Rico Bar in 1935. He was also a member of the American, Puerto Rico and Inter-American Bar Associations. On September 1, 1938, he was elected as a delegate for the district of Bayamon to the board of the Puerto Rico Bar Association.

In 1940 he was elected to the House of Representatives of Puerto Rico for the district of Humacao, as a member of the "Unificación Tripartita" party.

In 1959 he was awarded the Order of Isabella the Catholic in the grade of Knight.

He was the Honorary Consul for the Federal Republic of Germany in Puerto Rico.
