= Eugenio Fernández Cerra =

Senator of Puerto Rico

Member of the Puerto Rico Senate from the At-Large district
- In office 1960–1964

Personal details
- Born: April 19, 1920 Hato Rey, Puerto Rico
- Died: January 28, 2011 (aged 91) San Juan, Puerto Rico
- Party: Popular Democratic Party (PPD)
- Other political affiliations: Democratic
- Spouse: Isabel M. Comas
- Education: Johns Hopkins School of Medicine (MD)
- Occupation: Politician, Senator, Physician

Eugenio Fernández Cerra (April 19, 1920 – January 28, 2011) was a prominent Chest Physician and former Senator in the Puerto Rico Legislature for the Partido Popular Democratico.

Fernández Cerra graduated from Johns Hopkins School of Medicine in 1943 at a very young age (23 years old) and was a Lifetime Contributing Members to the university. He was President of the Medical Association of Puerto Rico and the Asociación de Hospitales de Puerto Rico. Founder of Triple S medical plan and its first chairman of the board. Founder of the Metropolitan Shopping Center, the first mall of Puerto Rico. Was elected in 1959 president of the Puerto Rico Medical Association.

Fernández Cerra was also an alternate delegate from the Puerto Rico Delegation to the 1964 Democratic National Convention. He participated in the Third International Congress on Diseases of the Chest, held in Barcelona, Spain on October 4 to 8 1954, where he presented his scientific paper "The Value of a Method of Areosol Bronchial Lavage for Obtaining Positive Cultures in Patients with Negative Sputa and Gastric Washings".

In 1999, Fernández established the Eugenio Fernandez-Cerra, M.D., Scholarship, a Johns Hopkins School of Medicine Scholarship with preference given to medical students from Puerto Rico. He was a member of Phi Sigma Alpha fraternity.

Married Isabel M. Comas on January 1, 1945, at St. Patrick's Cathedral, in New York City, New York.
