= Puerto Rico Energy Commission =

Puerto Rico Energy Bureau
Agency overview
- Formed: May 27, 2014; 10 years ago
- Jurisdiction: all of Puerto Rico
- Annual budget: $5 million USD
- Agency executive: Edison Avilés-Deliz, Chairman
- Key document: 57. 2014.

The Puerto Rico Energy Bureau is the government agency that regulates the energy industry in Puerto Rico. The commission was created with the primary intention of regulating the Puerto Rico Electric Power Authority (PREPA): the government-owned corporation and government monopoly that distributes and transmits all energy in Puerto Rico as well as producing 70% of all energy in Puerto Rico. Before the commission came into existence, PREPA regulated both itself and the energy industry without any oversight whatsoever. As renewable energy became economically feasible, Puerto Rico lagged behind in comparison to other jurisdictions. This did not bode well with several energy businesses and think tanks, such as the Association of Producers of Renewable Energy (APER) and the Center for the New Economy (CNE), which advocated for the creation of a separate independent entity capable of regulating the industry.

Organizationally, the commission is overseen by a board of directors comprised by three commissioners appointed by the governor with the advice and consent of the Senate. The commission is also supported by an executive director who works together with the Puerto Rico Energy Affairs Administration and provides technical advice to the commissioners.

After the September 2017 hurricanes largely destroyed the island's aging, neglected and fragile power grid, and among the rush to simply rebuild as fast as possible, advocates of renewable energy and micro grids tried to turn the conversation - and infrastructure investment - to solar PV, microgrids and combined heat and power (CHP). With microgrid regulations passed by PREC in May 2018, realizing the vision for such projects is likely still twenty years away.
