= Puerto Rico Industrial Development Company =

Government-owned corporation of Puerto Rico

Agency overview
- Formed: May 11, 1942; 84 years ago
- Preceding agency: Puerto Rico Economic Development Administration
- Jurisdiction: Executive branch
- Headquarters: San Juan, Puerto Rico
- Annual budget: $130m
- Agency executive: Roberto Lefranc Fortuño, Executive Director and Chief Executive Officer
- Parent department: Department of Economic Development and Commerce
- Child agency: South East Industrial Development Company
- Key document: Law No. 188 of 1942
- Website: www.pridco.pr.gov

The Puerto Rico Industrial Development Company (PRIDCO) —Spanish: Compañía de Fomento Industrial de Puerto Rico (or simply Fomento)— is a government-owned corporation of Puerto Rico authorized and empowered to attract private capital to Puerto Rico to establish trade, cooperatives, and industrial operations. As its primary function, PRIDCO provides real estate for industrial development.

== History ==
PRIDCO was created by the government of Puerto Rico in 1942 along with the Puerto Rico Government Development Bank (GDB) during the governorship of Rexford G. Tugwell. Its purpose was to finance the construction and operational management of industrial parks where stateside manufacturing companies could find low-rent venues for their operations.

For decades, PRIDCO operated as a subsidiary of the Puerto Rico Economic Development Administration (PREDA); the agency that oversaw the systematic operation which transformed the economy of Puerto Rico from an agricultural economy into an industrial one known as Operation Bootstrap. Bootstrap was the brainchild of PREDA's first administrator, Teodoro Moscoso. Other notable industrialists served in PREDA as well, such as Hugo David Storer Tavarez who served as the director of promotion for some years, and William Riefkohl who served as its deputy administrator from 1988 to 1992.

As PREDA continued to transform Puerto Rico, PRIDCO eventually became an independent agency. A government reorganization eventually merged PREDA into PRIDCO, establishing PRIDCO as the focal agency for all manufacturing in Puerto Rico while PREDA ceased to exist.

The agency is also now under the umbrella of the Department of Economic Development and Commerce of Puerto Rico (DDEC), an executive department.

In 2019, the agency was tasked with creating a database of business owners who are veterans of the United States military with a mandate to adhere to a law that requires supporting and helping veteran business owners.

Along with the Puerto Rico Department of Agriculture, in 2019, the organization discussed plans to import coffee beans from different locations in order to mix and cultivate new coffee plants in Puerto Rico.

In August, 2019 employees of PRIDCO protested against the direction of PROMESA, the non-elected board working on restructuring Puerto Rico's debt. PRIDCO employees demanded more transparency and more consideration for the work PRIDCO has been doing for decades.

In early 2020, the police were investigating the illegal transfer of funds by PRIDCO to overseas accounts.

== Executive directors ==
=== As PREDA ===
- Teodoro Moscoso
- José Madera
- Manuel Dubón
- Xavier Romeu

=== As PRIDCO ===
- 2025- Present: Roberto Lefranc Fortuño
- Eric Santiago Justiniano
- Javier Bayón
- Manuel Laboy
- Enrique Rodríguez Negrón
- Xavier Romeu
- Jaime Morgan Stubbe
- William Riefkohl
- Jorge Silva Puras
- Boris Jaskille
- Javier Vazquez Morales
- 2011–2013: José Pérez Riera
- 2013: Antonio Medina Comas
- Rafael L Ignacio Torres 1961-1965 vice-president PRIDCO
- Rafael L Ignacio Torres 1984-1990 President of PRIDCO
