= Puerto Rican Pottery =

Small pottery managed by master potter and ceramicist Hal Lasky

Puerto Rican Pottery was one of two potteries (Iroquois/Sterling China's Caribe Pottery was the other) that established Mid Century Modern pottery/ceramics on the island of Puerto Rico. The pottery operated from 1948 to 1966 in Santurce. It was a small pottery associated with and managed by master potter and ceramicist Hal Lasky.

Lasky won scholarships in the early and mid-1940s at several prestigious ceramic arts programs: Dartmouth College, University of the Arts (Philadelphia) (where he studied under Aurelius Renzetti), the ceramics school at Alfred University (Alfred, New York) and the Cranbrook Academy of Art in Bloomfield Hills, Michigan. Also, he exhibited at the Ceramic Nationals at Syracuse's Everson Museum of Art in both 1947 and 1948.

In December 1947, Lasky was asked by Teodoro Moscoso, architect of the Puerto Rico Industrial Development Company's Operation Bootstrap, to come to Puerto Rico to manage a small ceramic operation the Puerto Rican government had recently established. The operation had been supervised originally by the husband and wife team of Edwin Scheier and Mary Goldsmith. In 1948, the operation was privatized and funded by a private bank.

The pottery produced a line of hand-crafted terra cotta dinnerware and artware. Common dinnerware shapes were mugs, cups, tumblers, plates, bowls (covered and uncovered), tureens, casserole dishes, trays, teapots, and pitchers. Artware shapes included vases of various sizes, ashtrays, hooded candle holders, planters, incense pots, candelabra, and lamp bases.

The most common design patterns are sgraffito—shapes, symbols, and stylized figures of fruit and animals. Less common are inscriptions in English and Spanish or contours of human faces. Colors used in the glazes ranged from red, red and black, blue, blue and green, black, green, yellow, peach, teal, turquoise, as well as other colors.

Although all pieces were pressed, not thrown, each piece was individually designed, painted, and wood-fired—unique forms of art on their own. Lasky developed a one-step firing process that enabled him to produce pottery inexpensively and quickly.

== Production ==
The pieces were shaped and designed with the intent of reflecting artistically the best traditions of Puerto Rican culture and history. Lasky encouraged the artisans he stewarded to express themselves as they saw fit. Theirs was a collaborative effort.

In a 2004 account Lasky wrote:

The first thing I did was to take away all the Pre-Columbian patterns they had been working with and in my halting Spanish told them they were now free to design anything they wanted at any time. They were obviously shaken; for them 'designers' were either god-like people or Americans and they immediately began to copy the cheap seconds that at that time flooded Puerto Rico. I let them get that out of their systems and some three months later they began designing things they thought would please me.

Little by little I began encouraging them to use 'found tools': a broken hair comb - I picked up from the floor in front of them, used and discarded pencils - showing them the faceted sides and rounded eraser end as options. One of the best tools turned out to be old-fashioned hairpins women wore in the forties.

What emerged was an expression which can properly be described as a considerable leap beyond sgraffito. When using colored engobes (thin coatings of different colored clays over the redware clay body we were using) instead of thinly scratching through to reveal the contrasting red clay beneath they made strong, broad, energetic sculptural carvings if you will. Matte glazes were used almost invariably to more thoroughly reveal the sculptural 'carving' technique. Each person signed their own design work and had the satisfaction of seeing their initials permanently fired into their pieces. They were free at any time to stop any work they were doing and create their own designs.

During this period of time I made it my business to keep away from the work table area where they did the designing. I didn't want even my presence near them to interfere with their own self-expression. I would wait until they had left for the day to go into the damp room where the daily work was placed for slow initial drying to see what creatively had emerged. Imagine, if you will, the profound thrill I would experience as with each ongoing week the design 'personalities' of each would become more strongly expressed so that it was no longer necessary to look for each signature to determine whose work it was.

== Significance ==
The pottery's significance was twofold. Artistically and culturally it was a melding of 20th century design on what was then a traditional culture. It was also the first time that Puerto Rican artisans were able to express themselves freely in clay since the time of the Taínos. Economically and politically it was part of the opening gambit in the rapid economic development of the island by the US after World War II. The pottery supplied pieces and works for the then burgeoning tourist trade.
