= Technology industry in Puerto Rico =

The technology industry in Puerto Rico represents 28.3% of the manufacturing sector in the economy of Puerto Rico.

== History ==
In 1999, the technology sector in Puerto Rico was ranked 16th in exports and 37th in employment as compared to the 50 states and Washington DC.

As a result of the Puerto Rican government-debt crisis, interest in revitalizing the economy through the technology sector was expressed, with Alberto Bacó Bagué describing it as "one of the pillars of our economic development program".

== See also ==
- Manufacturing in Puerto Rico
- Pharmaceutical industry in Puerto Rico
- Telecommunications in Puerto Rico
