= Operation Bootstrap =

Series of projects which transformed the economy of Puerto Rico

Operation Bootstrap (Spanish: Operación Manos a la Obra) is the name given to a series of projects which industrialized the economy of Puerto Rico. The government of the United States, together with what is known today as the Puerto Rico Industrial Development Company, set forth a series of ambitious economical projects that evolved Puerto Rico into an industrial high-income territory compared to the region. Bootstrap is still considered to be the foundation of Puerto Rico's economic model. (Note: FPH (in Spanish) "[...] nuestro actual modelo económico continúa fundamentado en los principios establecidos por Operación Manos a la Obra.")

== History ==
Puerto Rico's traditional economy was based around sugarcane plantations; of the 516,730 jobs on the island in 1940, almost half were agriculture-based, with 124,076 of these based on sugarcane farms. However, Esteban Bird described in detail the misgivings of the sugarcane industry and the monoculture economy in general. After possession was transferred to the United States in 1898 following the Spanish-American War, it was mostly neglected. Conditions in Puerto Rico worsened during the World Wars, and by the middle of the twentieth century it was one of the poorest islands in the Caribbean. Pressure grew in the U.S. to address the worsening situation, influenced by journalists like John Gunther, who described the island in 1941:

"I saw, in short, misery, disease, squalor, filth. It would be lamentable enough to see this anywhere...to see it on American territory...is a paralyzing jolt to anyone who believes in American standards of progress and civilization."

In May 1947, the Puerto Rican legislature passed the Industrial Incentives Act. eliminating all corporate taxes, to encourage U.S. investment in industry. The initiative granted private and foreign investment a ten year period of exemption from taxes on many of the expenses for businesses involved in the industrial economy. These exemptions included:

- "license fees, excises, or other municipal taxes levied by any ordinance of any municipality,"
- "property devoted to industrial development,
- "income tax on income from industrial development," and more.

This was proposed by Senator Luis Muñoz Marín of the Popular Democratic Party, and became known as Operation Bootstrap. Based on 1930s New Deal economic relief reforms and infrastructure provided by the programs such as the Puerto Rico Reconstruction Administration, Operation Bootstrap intended to move Puerto Rico away from its agrarian system and into an industrial economy. The government's Administration of Economic Development — today known as the Puerto Rico Industrial Development Company (PRIDCO) — encouraged the establishment of factories. Following the Elective Governor Act of 1947 (also known as the Crawford-Butler Act), Muñoz was elected the first governor of Puerto Rico while under U.S. control, paving the way for the full establishment of Operation Bootstrap across the island. According to Virginia Sanchez Korrol from the Center for Puerto Rican Studies, Operation Bootstrap was based on 3 essential elements:

“1) industrialization by invitation: the inducement of American corporations to relocate in Puerto Rico in exchange for lucrative tax benefits;

(2) a cheap labor pool, educated in the English language and under a U.S. imposed curriculum;

(3) proposed emigration of over a third of the island’s population, a security measure to insure the plan’s viability.”

The US government in Puerto Rico enticed US companies by providing labor at costs below those on the mainland, access to US markets without import duties, and profits that could transfer to the mainland free from federal taxation. The Administration of Economic Development invited investment of external capital, importing the raw materials, and exporting the finished products to the mainland. To entice participation, tax exemptions and differential rental rates were offered for industrial facilities. As a result, Puerto Rico's economy shifted labor from agriculture to manufacturing and tourism. The manufacturing sector has shifted from the original labor-intensive industries, such as the manufacturing of food, tobacco, leather, and apparel products, to more capital-intensive industries, such as pharmaceuticals, chemicals, machinery, and electronics. Through this project, a rural agricultural society was transformed into an industrial working class.

Although initially touted as an economic miracle, by the 1960s, Operation Bootstrap was increasingly hampered by a growing unemployment problem. As living standards and wages in Puerto Rico rose, manpower-intensive industries faced competition from outside the United States.

As of 2005 the continental United States remains Puerto Rico's major trading partner, received 86% of Puerto Rico's exports and providing 69% of its imports.

== Effects ==
=== Increased living standards ===
Those able to secure a stable job as a result of Operation Bootstrap received higher wages than before, in fact, "The average real weekly salary in manufacturing increased from $18 for men and $12 for women in 1953 to $44 and $37 respectively in 1963." The increase in industrialization and manufacturing saw positive effects in other places, as new electric grids were built, new roads were paved in major cities, and major housing development was underway. As a result, life expectancy in Puerto Rico jumped almost 23 years.

=== Shift in job market ===
Salaried employees in Puerto Rico during Operation Bootstrap
Decade	Jobs in fishing & agriculture	Decade-over-decade ratio	Jobs in manufacturing	Decade-over-decade ratio	Employment net loss (Note: While the total sum of employment in fishing, agriculture, and manufacturing did experience a net loss, the industrialization process created jobs in other sectors. The net loss portrayed in this table only takes into account direct jobs associated within these industries without taking into account the indirect jobs associated with them such as those in the service industry and government. The financial sector grew from 10% of GNP in 1950 to 14.4% in 1980, and the governmental sector grew from 10% in 1950 to 17.1% in 1980. Regardless of all this, Puerto Rico did experience an overall net loss due to Bootstrap. The data show that the new economic model generated growth but no employment. New jobs created in manufacturing did not fully compensate for jobs lost in agriculture.)	Employment net loss ratio
1940s	Steady / 230,000	Steady / N/A	Steady / 56,000	Steady / N/A	Steady / N/A	Steady / N/A
1950s	▼ / 216,000	▼ / 6.08%	▼ / 55,000	▼ / 1.79%	▼ / 15,000	▼ / 5.24%
1960s	▼ / 125,000	▼ / 42.13%	▲ / 81,000	▲ / 47.27%	▼ / 65,000	▼ / 23.99%
1970s	▼ / 68,000	▼ / 45.60%	▲ / 132,000	▲ / 62.96%	▼ / 6,000	▼ / 2.91%
Total	▼ / 162,000	▼ / 70.43%	▲ / 76,000	▲ / 135.71%	▼ / 86,000	▼ / 30.07%

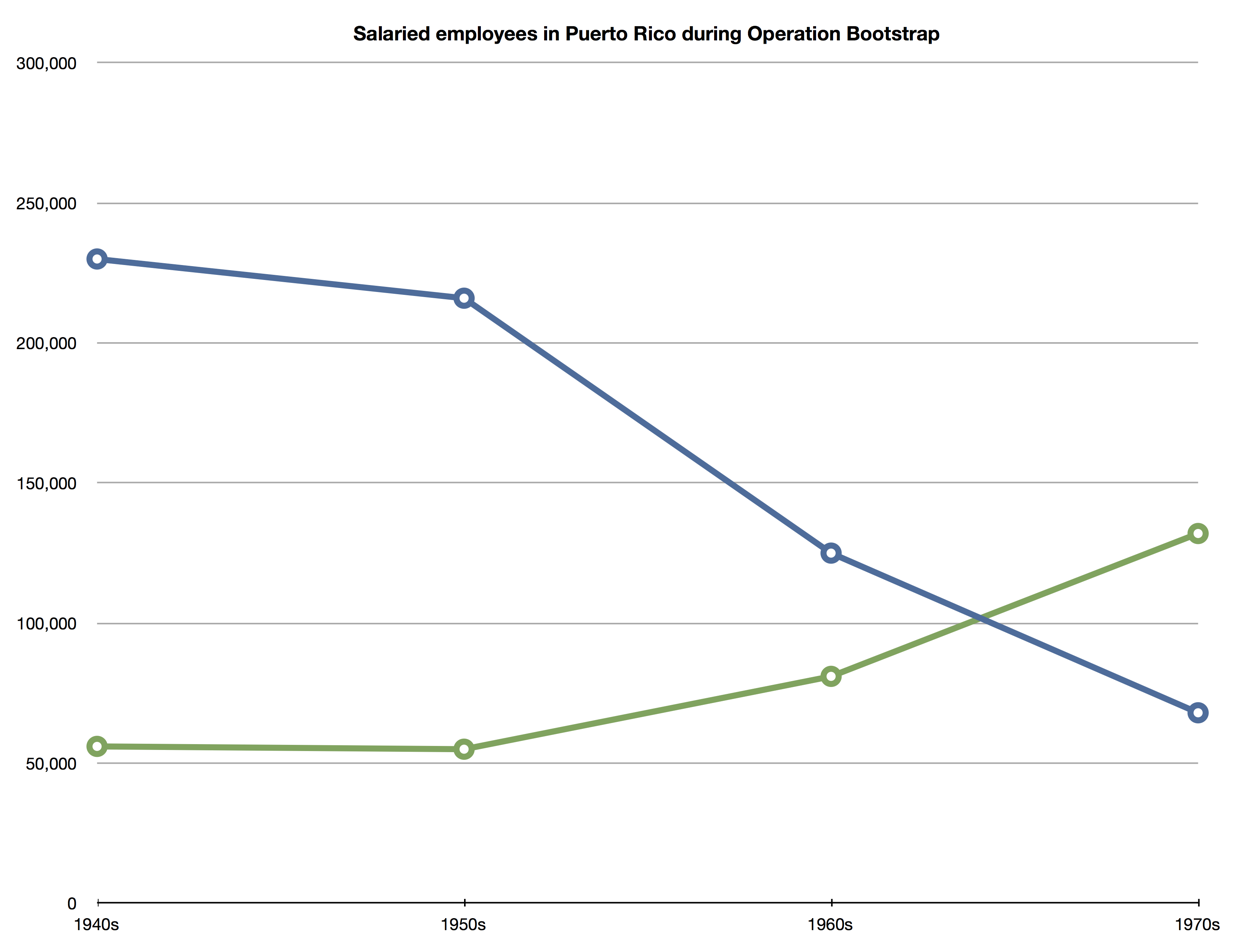
Chart demonstrating how the economy of Puerto Rico shifted from agriculture to manufacturing by showing how the salaried employees during Operation Bootstrap significantly increased manufacturing jobs (green line) while decreasing agricultural jobs (blue line).

Manufacturing jobs also led to a shift in the job market as it pertains to gender. In 1940, women represented half of the total population of Puerto Rico, but represented less than 25% of the labor force. Women in Operation Bootstrap were targeted as an important labor force, especially for the garment and apparel industry, which represented a share of the manufacturing market.

In January 2024, the State of Puerto Rico relaxed its remote work requirements with Act 52-2022, which exempts foreign employers with no connection to Puerto Rico from withholding income tax for employees working remotely in Puerto Rico, provided certain conditions are met.

=== Education ===
At the time, modernization theory was the driving force behind American program development in the Cold War era. As a result, Operation Bootstrap focused on educational development to fuel economic development in Puerto Rico. In the 1950s, education was viewed as the cornerstone of Island development and was allocated more of the Islands budget than any other public sector. From 1932-1957 the number of students enrolled in vocational education went from 5,700 to 110,000. The rise in vocational education was designed to prepare Puerto Rican's for work in factories newly developed by the Bootstrap program.

=== Coerced sterilization ===
Throughout the 1940s and to the 1960s, programs supported by the United States encouraged sterilization and birth control for the women on the island. These programs were birthed out of a perceived "overpopulation" problem on the island. Puerto Rican families averaged 5 to 6 people per family, and this was labeled as partly the reason for the unemployment and high poverty rates on the island. Luis Muñoz Marín was concerned that the perceived overpopulation problem could derail Operation Bootstrap, so his administration was in support. Across the island, the sterilization procedure was referred to as 'la operación." According to Antonia Darder, "By 1969, 35% of all Puerto Rican women of child-bearing age had undergone la operación."

== See also ==
- United States Department of Agriculture
- Commonwealth Oil Refining Company
- Progress Island U.S.A.
- Puerto Rican Pottery
