= Eugenia fajardensis =

Scientific classification
- Kingdom: Plantae
- Clade: Tracheophytes
- Clade: Angiosperms
- Clade: Eudicots
- Clade: Rosids
- Order: Myrtales
- Family: Myrtaceae
- Genus: Eugenia
- Species: E. fajardensis

Binomial name
- Eugenia fajardensis (Krug & Urb.) Urb.

Synonyms
- Eugenia fragrans var. fajardensis Krug & Urb.

Species of flowering plant

Eugenia fajardensis (also called guayabote de costa, or Fajardo guayabacón) is a species of plant endemic to Puerto Rico. Today it is limited to the northeastern corner of the island, specifically in the municipality of Fajardo within the Northeast Ecological Corridor, and to the island-municipalities of Vieques and Culebra. First discovered by German botanist Paul Sintenis between 1884 and 1887, it remained largely forgotten due, partly, to the fact that Sintenis' first set of his Puerto Rican collections was mostly destroyed at Dahlem (Berlin) during the Second World War. In 2005 Puerto Rican botanists Juan Carlos Trejo, with Miguel Vives, Marcos Caraballo and Tomás Carlo "re-discovered" the species in Vieques Island.
