= Progress Island U.S.A. =

1973 film

- Directed by: Jorge Delgado
- Produced by: Fucci/Stone Productions Inc.
- Release date: 1973
- Running time: 13 minutes

Progress Island U.S.A. is a 1973 short subject film directed by Jorge Delgado and made by the Puerto Rico Economic Development Administration to promote the burgeoning U.S. Commonwealth.

== Summary ==
The film, produced by Fucci/Stone Productions, Inc in 1973, presents a description of Puerto Rico of the late 1960s and early 1970s. It shows some of what the island had to offer at that time. The commercial short, which is only 13 minutes long, explains that Puerto Rico is "American in every respect" except for its "360 days of sunshine," due to the results of Operation Bootstrap.

== In other media ==
The short appeared in Mystery Science Theater 3000 episode 621, as support for the main feature, The Beast of Yucca Flats.

== See also ==
- Burger King - one of the many corporations featured in the short and joked by Tom Servo as "Indigenous cuisine"
- Cinema of Puerto Rico
- 1973 in film
