= Northeast Ecological Corridor =

Protected Nature Reserve in Puerto Rico

Northeast Ecological Corridor Nature Reserve
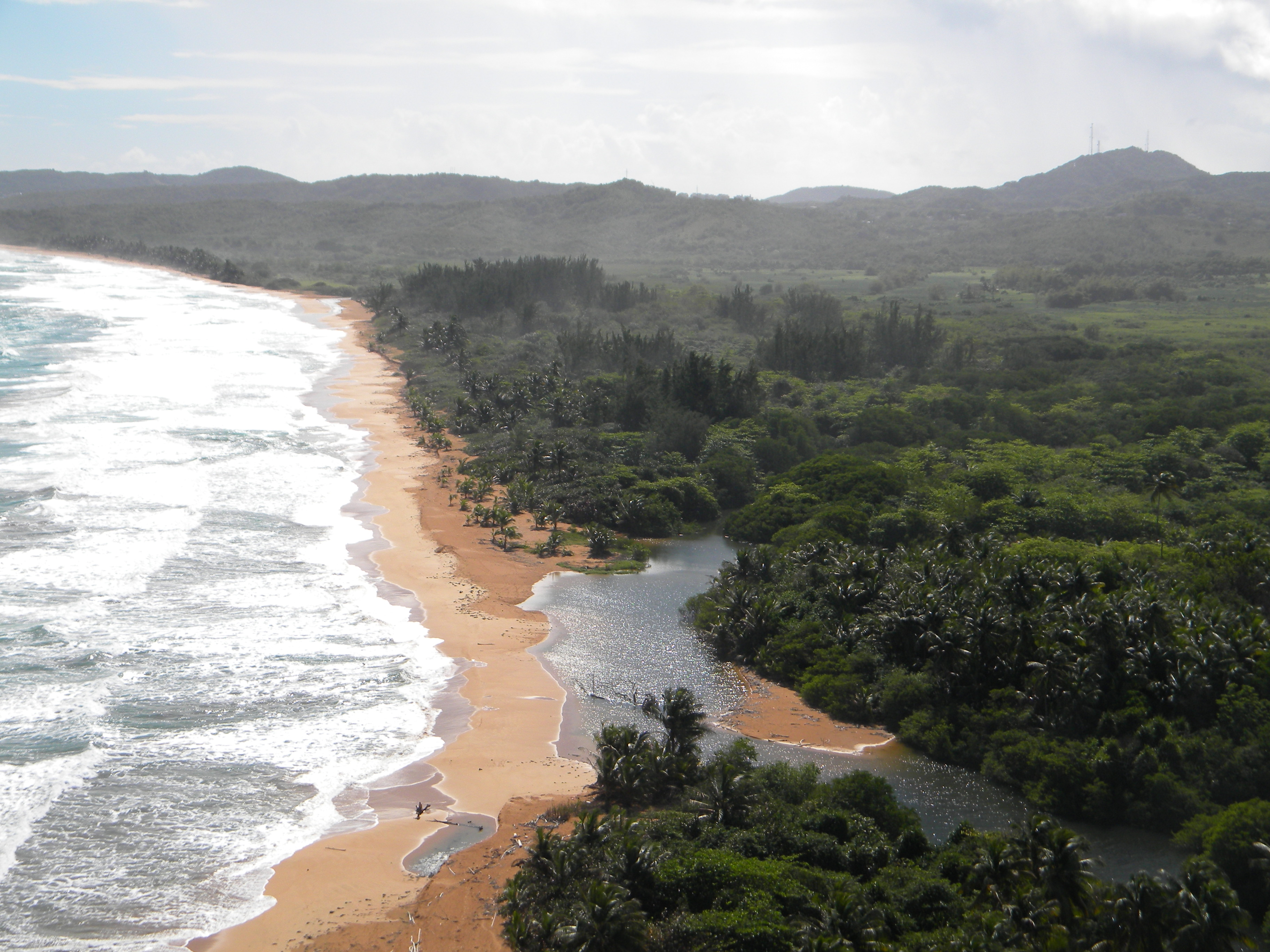
- Interactive map of Northeast Ecological Corridor Nature Reserve
- Location: Puerto Rico
- Nearest city: Luquillo
- Coordinates: 18°21′00″N 65°39′00″W
- Area: 2,970 acres (12.0 km^{2})
- Designation: Disputed Protected Area
- Established: 2008 (rescinded in 2009, re-established in 2012-13)
- Governing body: Commonwealth of Puerto Rico

The Northeast Ecological Corridor Nature Reserve (NECNR) (Spanish: Reserva Natural Corredor Ecológico del Noreste) refers to an area designated as a protected Nature Reserve located on the northeast coast of Puerto Rico, between the municipalities of Luquillo and Fajardo. Specifically, the lands that comprise the NEC are located between Luquillo's town square to the west and Seven Seas Beach to the east, being delineated by PR Route # 3 to its south and the Atlantic Ocean to its north. It was decreed as a protected area by former Puerto Rico Governor Aníbal S. Acevedo-Vilá in April 2008, a decision reversed by Governor Luis G. Fortuño-Burset in October 2009, although he later passed a law in June 2012 re-designated as nature reserve two-thirds of its lands, after intense lobbying and public pressure. Later, in 2013, Governor Alejandro García-Padilla signed a law declaring all lands within the NEC a nature reserve. The area comprises 2,969.64 acres (1,201.77 hectares), which include such diverse habitats as forest, wetlands, beaches, coral communities, and a sporadically bioluminescent lagoon. The Corridor is also home to 866 species of flora and fauna, of which 54 are considered critical elements, meaning rare, threatened, endangered and endemic species classified by the Puerto Rico Department of Natural and Environmental Resources (DNER), some even designated as critically endangered by the International Union for Conservation of Nature and Natural Resources (IUCN). These include, among others, federally endangered species such as the plain pigeon, the snowy plover, the Puerto Rican boa, the hawksbill sea turtle and the West Indian manatee. The beaches along the NEC, which are 8.74 kilometres (5.43 mi) long are important nesting grounds for the leatherback sea turtle (Dermochelys coriacea), which starts its nesting season around April each year.

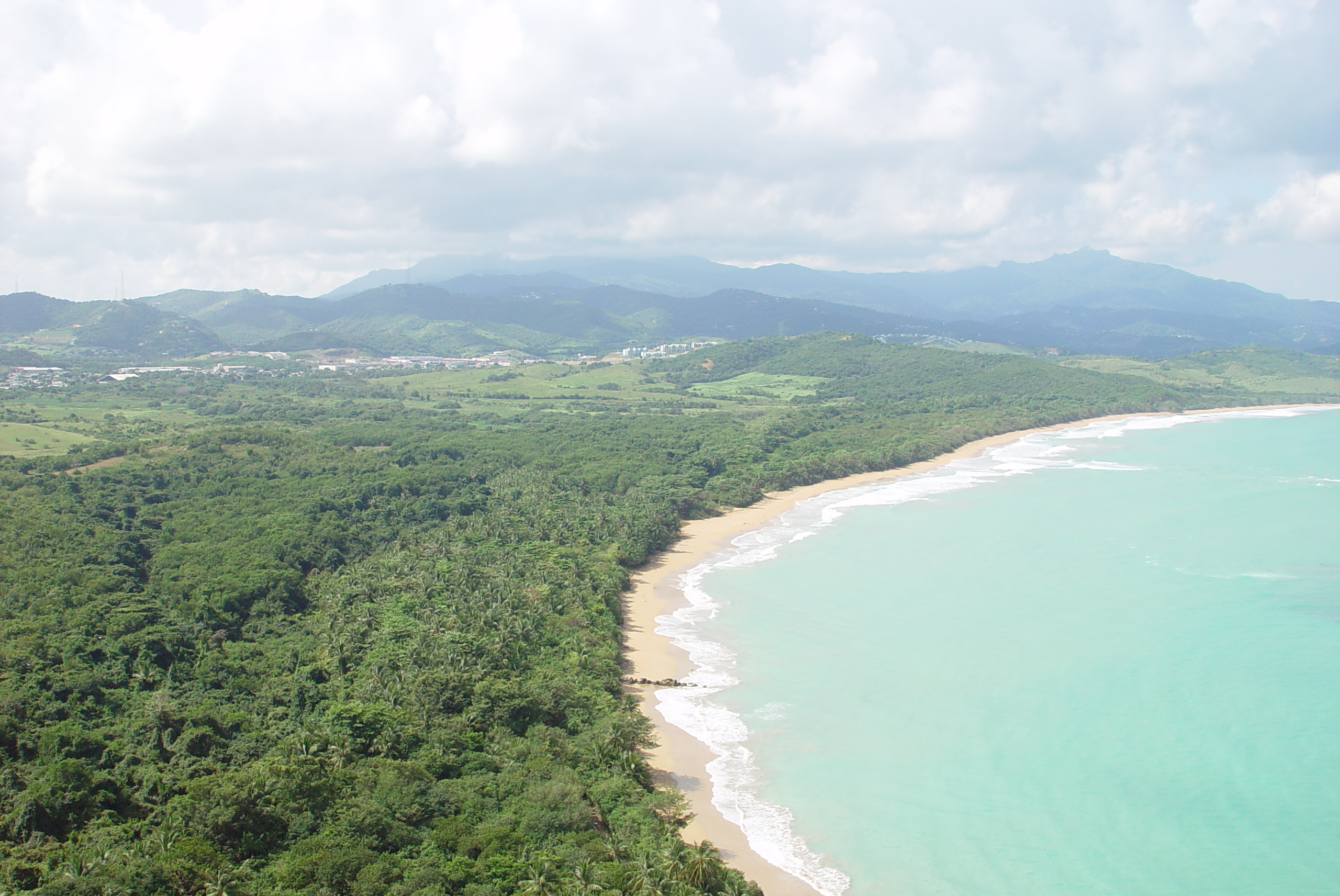
El Convento Beach within the Northeast Ecological Corridor (Fajardo, Puerto Rico) and panoramic view of El Yunque National Forest in the background.

A grassroots campaign started in the late '90s by concerned citizens, and eventually led by Sierra Club's newly formed Puerto Rico Chapter and other member organizations since 2004, had as its goal the preservation of the NEC. These organizations banded together to form the Coalition for the Northeast Ecological Corridor in 2005 in order to better coordinate their efforts, adopting a formal structure in October 2011. The Coalition's members have used an extensive media campaign and lawsuits in order to halt constructions and have the NEC designated as a nature reserve, achieving reserve status for the NEC in 2008 only to have it reversed in 2009. In November 2010 the Puerto Rico Planning Board (PRPB) unveiled its plan for the Grand Northeast Ecological Corridor Reserve Special Planning Area, which according to its designation document would augment the protected area to 4,006.29 acres (1,621.29 hectares). Nevertheless, members of the Coalition for the Northeast Ecological Corridor have stated that some of the newly protected areas the PRPB would designate in its 2010 plan are susceptible to flooding, already enjoy protected status, or are already developed, making protection of these areas unnecessary. Meanwhile, the new plan, they contended, would leave unprotected 437.05 acres (176.87 hectares) of ecologically sensitive lands precisely where developers had earlier intended to build megaresorts. In January 2012 the Puerto Rico Appeals Court issued a ruling that temporarily barred any Puerto Rican agency from issuing construction permits for proposed projects within the rescinded reserve while the courts issued final verdicts. This ruling was overturned by the Supreme Court of Puerto Rico shortly thereafter, a decision that turned academic as a law signed in 2012 granted protection to those lands within the NEC that are of public domain (comprising 1,957 acres (792 hectares)), or two-thirds of its original designation and another law, signed in 2013, granted nature reserve status to the NEC in its entirety.

== Preservation campaign and conservation efforts ==
The NEC has been proposed to be designated as a nature reserve by the local and federal governments since 1978, as established in the Puerto Rico Coastal Management Program under the US Coastal Zone Management Act. In 1990, a large part of the NEC was designated as a Coastal Barrier under the US Coastal Barrier Resources Act. In 1992, the PR DNER presented an official designation document to the PR Planning Board in order to designate all the lands within the NEC as a nature reserve. Nevertheless, after the election of 1992, the recently elected government administration of Pedro J. Rosselló-González requested the Planning Board not to approve the designation of the NEC as a nature reserve as it wanted to promote tourism development in the area. The new administration's land use vision for the NEC was approved in the 1996 Northeast Coast Tourism Development Conceptual Plan, which zoned the area to allow for massive residential and tourism developments and golf courses.

=== Initial efforts ===
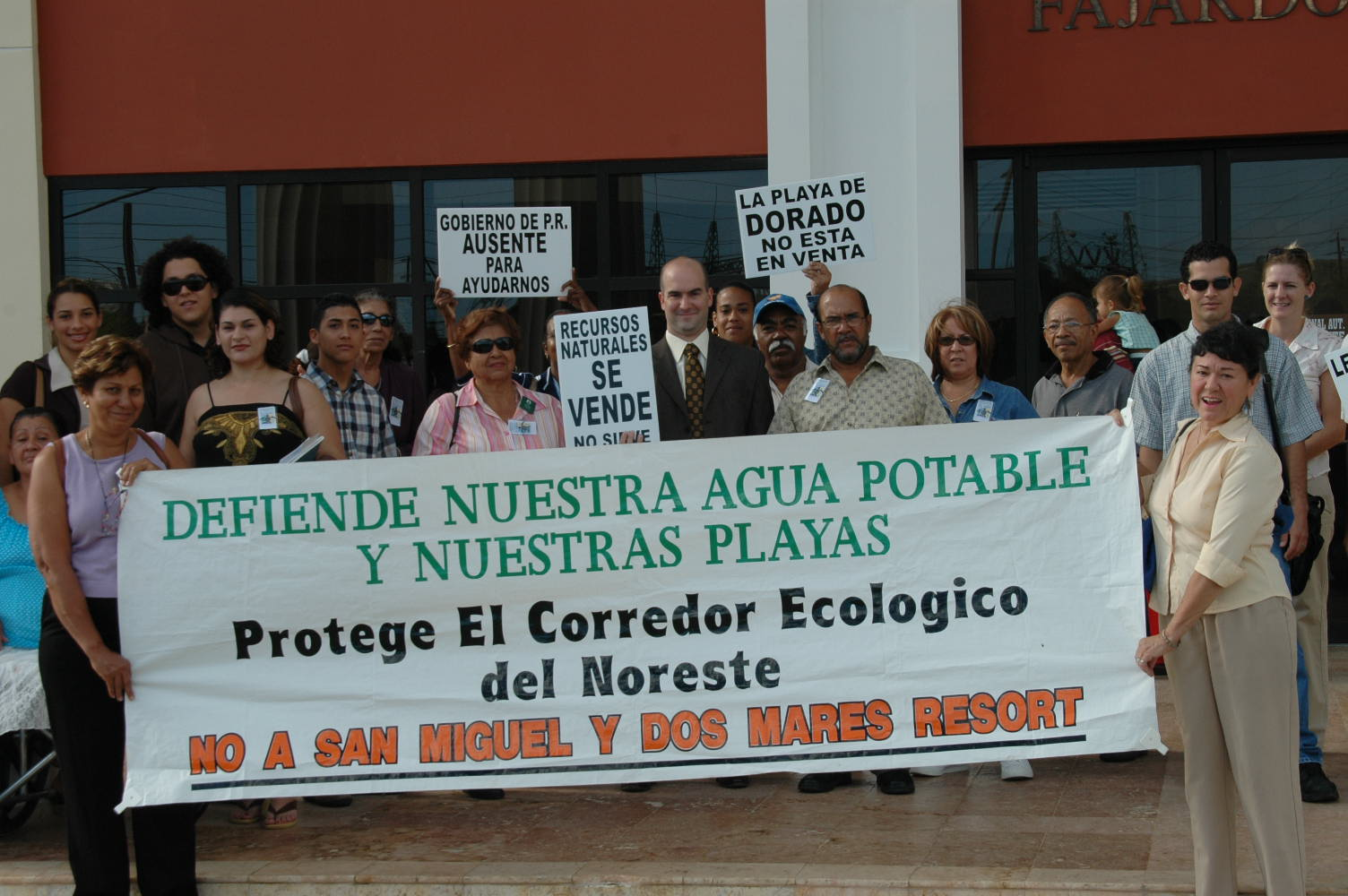
Members of the Coalition for the Northeast Ecological Corridor in front of the Fajardo Courthouse in Puerto Rico, after presenting legal action to halt permits issued for the San Miguel Resort construction.

After the 1996 Northeast Coast Tourism Development Conceptual Plan was approved, two megaresorts were proposed to be constructed in the NEC: (1) Dos Mares Marriott Resort – consisting of 3,450 residential and tourist units, an 18-hole golf course and a 9-hole golf course, among other related facilities; and (2) San Miguel Four Seasons Resort – consisting of 1,450 residential and hotel units and two golf courses, of 18 holes and 9 holes respectively, among other amenities.

The plan's detractors contended that over 80% of the units proposed by both projects were exclusively residential, which seriously undermined the developers' claim that these were tourism projects. They also argued that these projects would result in deforestation, land movement, filling of wetlands, channelization of rivers, and the clearance of coastal vegetation, significantly impacting the species and other living resources that depend on the NEC. They also contended that golf course maintenance practices would include the use of toxic substances such as herbicides, which could affect the water quality of surface, underground, and coastal waters. Further, it was argued that both projects would severely limit public access to the NEC's beaches, public lands and other public natural resources, as well as further depleting the limited water supplies needed by local communities, affecting the quality of life of thousands in the region.

During the 1998 public hearings held by the PR Environmental Quality Board and the PR Planning Board for both projects' environmental impact statements (EIS's) and site permits, respectively, different stakeholders started exchanging contact information in order to collaborate in halting the approval of the project's EIS's and site permits. They considered that the official documents presented by the project's proponents were substantially weak and incomplete. For example, San Miguel Resort's EIS indicated that the NEC's rivers flowed into the "Pacific Ocean", instead of the "Atlantic Ocean". These groups also contended that both EIS's did not consider general public access to the coast nor their significant cumulative environmental impacts, especially towards the already strained water supply in Puerto Rico's northeast coast. The initial NEC campaign's message focused on how the proposed residential and tourism projects were going to: (1) deplete the limited water supplies needed by local communities, affecting the quality of life of thousands of citizens in the eastern region of Puerto Rico; (2) promote more urban sprawl throughout El Yunque National Forest's coastal buffer zone; and (3) severely limit public access to local beaches, public lands and other public natural resources.

In the case of the region's limited water supplies, the Puerto Rican government had recently published the Puerto Rico Water Plan, which indicated that the region already had a water deficit of 3.6 million gallons per day (MGD). Regarding El Yunque's buffer zone, according to a 2004 U.S. Forest Service's International Institute of Tropical Forestry study, 86% of all new urban areas established at El Yunque Special Planning Area between 1985 and 2001 did not comply with current land use zoning regulations, a situation that encouraged the urban sprawl that was eating away El Yunque's coastal buffer zone and enhanced the importance of the only continuous, non-developed, largely forested remaining area in the northeast coast: the Northeast Ecological Corridor. The two proposed projects: Dos Mares and Four Seasons resorts, they argued, would further compromise the ecological integrity of this area since both of projects' developers were requesting land use changes in certain areas to the PR Planning Board; specifically the request was for re-designation from "natural resource conservation" zoning district to "tourism development" zoning district.

In addition, both projects conducted deforestation and land movement activities without the required permits, resulting in changes to the natural patterns of runoff and direct impacts to important ecological zones. Construction of the Phase I of the Dos Mares project (adjacent to the NEC) impacted some tributaries to the Aguas Prietas Lagoon (located within the NEC) and increased sedimentation levels to this irreplaceable water body, where sporadic bioluminescence occurs. Dos Mares' proponents were fined $140,000 for these illegal activities by the PR DNER and United States Fish and Wildlife Service.

=== Coalition building ===
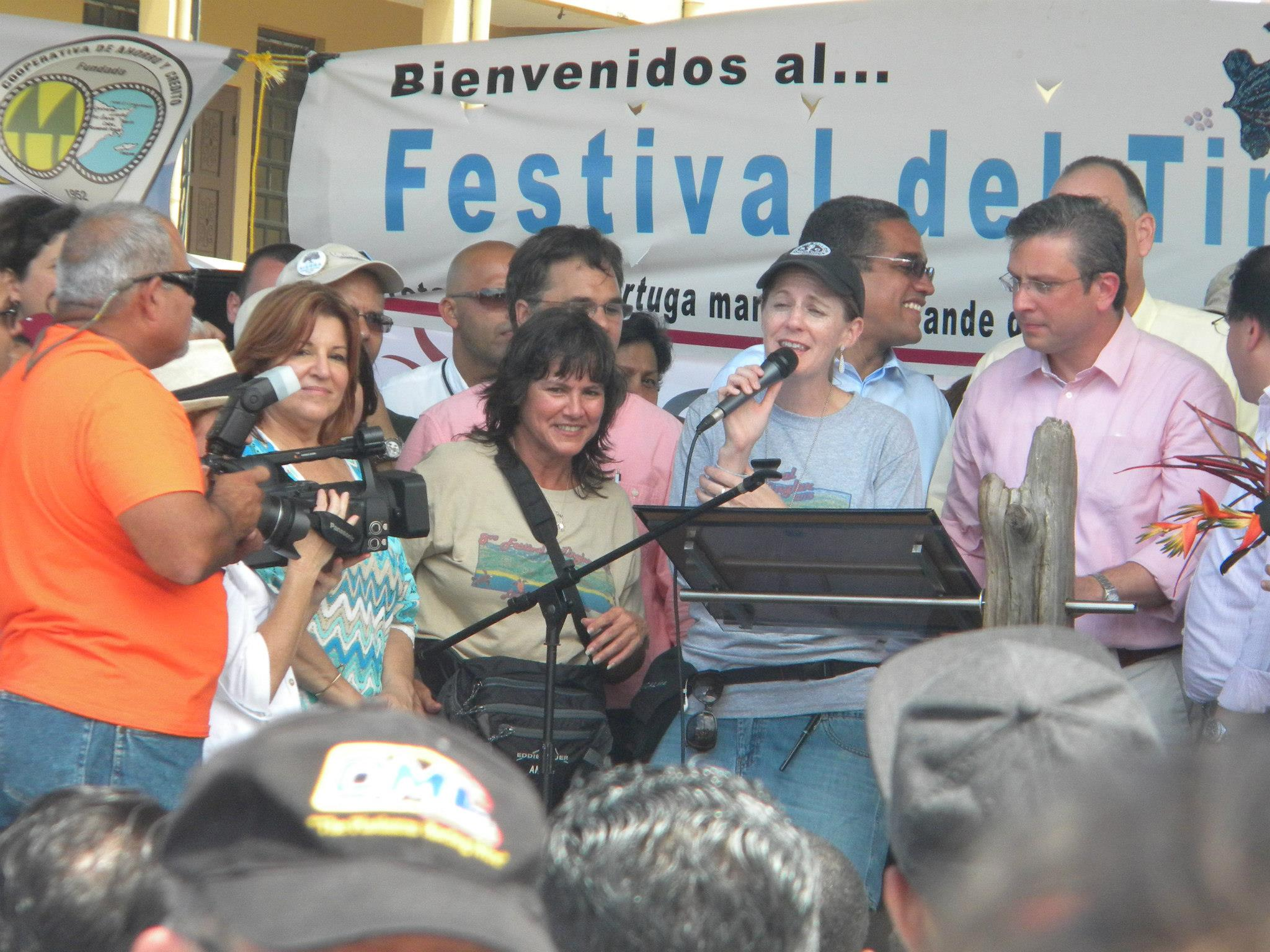
Hon. Alejandro García-Padilla (right), governor of Puerto Rico, signs the law to declare all lands within the Northeast Ecological Corridor a nature reserve. Speaking is Camilla Feibelman, former Coordinator for the Puerto Rico Chapter of the Sierra Club. To her left, Angie Colón-Pagán, President of the Coalition for the Northeast Ecological Corridor. Taken during the 8th Leatherback Turtle Festival on April 13, 2013.

More than 20 different interest groups (fishermen's associations, residents, community groups, business associations, recreationalists, university professors, students, and conservation NGOs, among others) forged in 2004 what came to be known as the Coalition for the Northeast Ecological Corridor. As the Coalition was organizing, the Puerto Rico Chapter of the Sierra Club was authorized by the national charter on February 19, 2005. The Sierra Club provided added capacity in community organization and campaign design and organized a number of workshops in order to formalize the Coalition's strategies and tactics, and the Coalition officially came into existence on April 25, 2005.

The Coalition's main goals include designation of the NEC as a nature reserve with its development activities based on ecotourism and nature tourism. The organizations that originally made up the Coalition were: Ceiba Pro Development Alliance (APRODEC in Spanish), the Association of Professionals and Traders of Fajardo (ACOMPRO in Spanish), the Federation of Fisherpersons of Puerto Rico and Defenders of the Sea, Inc. (FEDEMAR in Spanish), Rosendo Matienzo Cintrón Cultural House, 4H Clubs, Fortuna Community, Defenders of Barrio Juan Martín and the Northeast Ecological Corridor, Allied Interdisciplinary Environmental Groups (GAIA in Spanish), Brotherhood of Eastern Artisans, Protecting Animals in Eastern Puerto Rico (PARE ESTE, Inc.), the Puerto Rico Chapter of Sierra Club, University of Puerto Rico at Carolina Chapter of Internal Tourism; while the Sustainable Development Initiative serves as an advisory group. There are also other private and professional organizations that have joined the coalition efforts, such as the Conservation Trust of Puerto Rico, the Puerto Rico Planning Society, the Camping Association of Puerto Rico, and the Ecumenical and Interfaith Coalition Puerto Rico. In 2008, the Coalition was recognized with the Miranda Foundation Award for Solidarity.

The Coalition also had the support of numerous United States and international conservation NGOs. Their support was through personalized letters directed to local decision-makers, National Action Alerts, small grants for educational materials (brochures), and US press coverage, among others. Entities included: Sierra Club, National Wildlife Federation, Waterkeeper Alliance, Surfrider Foundation, Coastal Alliance, and World Wildlife Fund. The NEC's campaign was also supported by actors Benicio Del Toro and Edward James Olmos, as well as environmental lawyer Robert F. Kennedy, Jr. and Casa Pueblo founder Alexis Massol-González. They provided their support through official public statements and through personal communications with high-level decision makers in the government of Puerto Rico.

Since 2006 the Coalition for the Northeast Ecological Corridor has held the Leatherback Turtle Festival at the Luquillo Town Square in April each year in order to celebrate the beginning of the leatherback turtle's nesting season. The festival has been used as an education and lobbying venue in order to promote both the importance of protecting this endangered species and its most important nesting place in Northeast Puerto Rico, the NEC.

=== Legislative and legal action ===
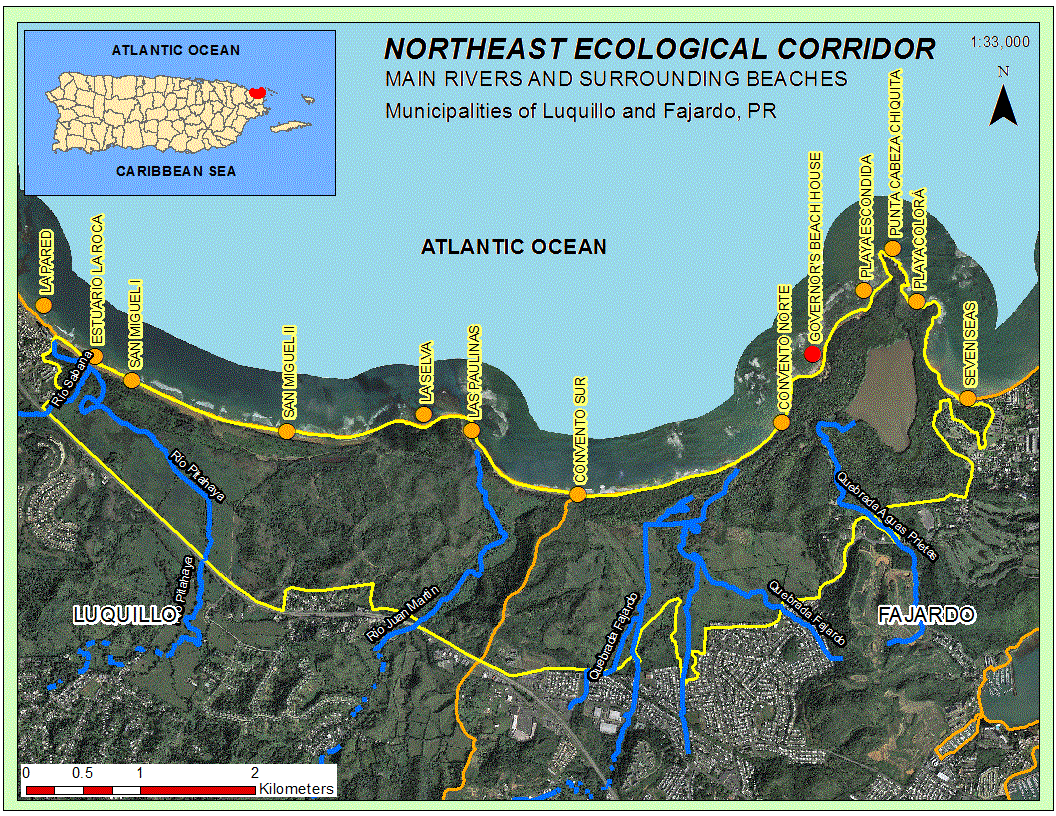
Aerial photograph of Puerto Rico's Northeast Ecological Corridor Nature Reserve, with its main rivers and surrounding beaches.

Although there were plans to officially establish in the NEC a permanent reserve as well as plans to establish eco-hospices, bicycle trails and access to beaches, a proposed bill that would create a nature reserve (PR Bill 2105 of 2007) would give the government and concerned groups only eighteen months to acquire privately owned lands within the Corridor. In the case that the lands could not be acquired, the natural reserve designation would be rescinded. Considering these amendments to be "poison pills", former Governor Aníbal S. Acevedo-Vilá decided to veto the law and instructed, by means of Executive Order OE-2007-37 on October 4, 2007, the PR Planning Board to establish a nature reserve, edit a draft for the Land Use and Management Plan as well as to delineate the reserve's borders. The PR Planning Board approved in its Resolution No. PU-02-2008-24(23) on February 6, 2008, the limits for the NEC and on April 24, 2008, Governor Acevedo-Vilá signed Executive Order OE-2008-22 which officially established the Northeast Ecological Corridor Nature Reserve. The decision was later reversed by Governor Luis G. Fortuño-Burset via OE-2009-42 on October 30, 2009.

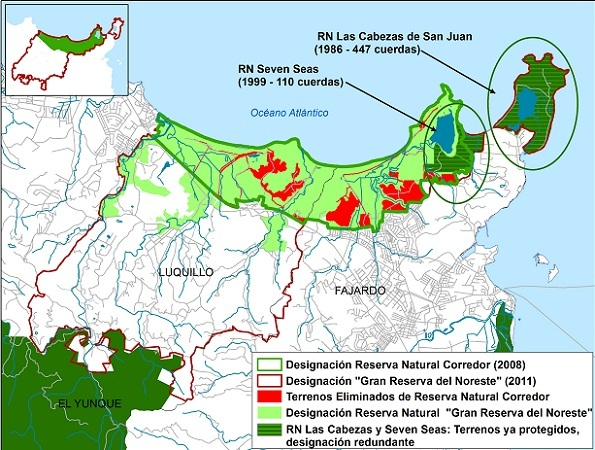
The Grand Northeast Ecological Reserve Special Planning Area. Proponents argued that this plan would protect a wider area in order to maintain connectivity with El Yunque National Forest. Detractors stated that while some of the "newly protected areas" already enjoyed protected status, were flood-prone, or already constructed, on the other hand 437 acres (177 hectares) would have their protected status rescinded.

In 2011 the Puerto Rico Planning Board announced plans to approve the Grand Northeast Ecological Corridor Reserve Special Planning Area. Although the Fortuño Administration insisted that it was protecting more areas than the original 2,970 acres (1,200 hectares) included in the reserve, environmental activists point out that more than 437 acres (177 hectares) of the originally designated areas had their protected status rescinded. Furthermore, some of the areas under the Special Planning Area constituted part of existing reserves or within floodplains where construction would be prohibited regardless.

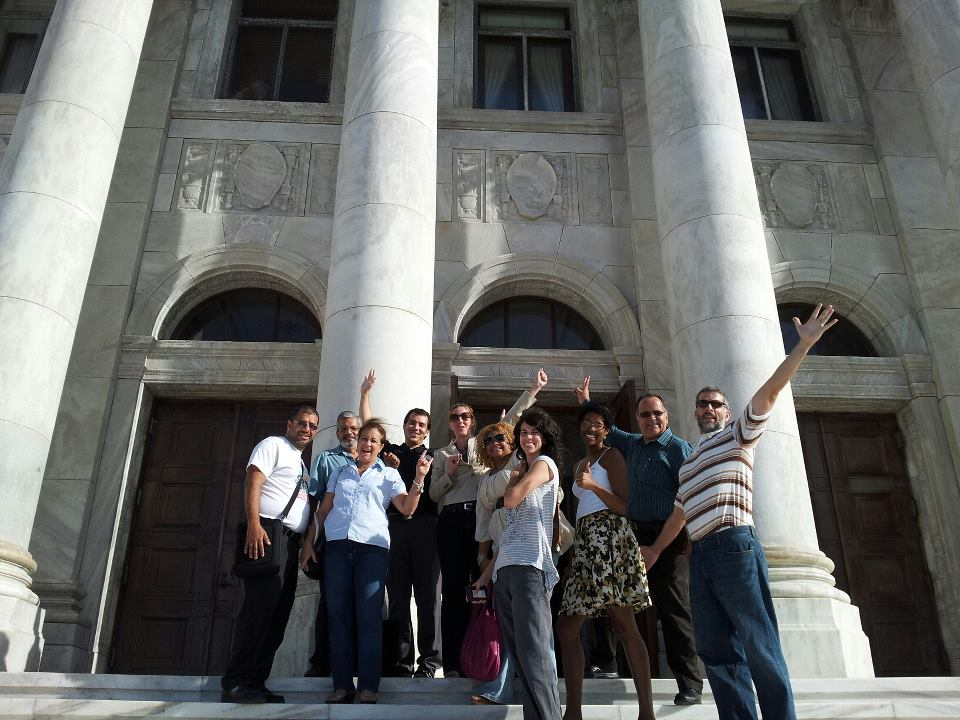
On May 21, 2012, members of the Coalition for the Northeast Ecological Corridor celebrate in front of the Puerto Rican Legislature the passage of Senate Bill 2282 by the House of Representatives. The bill led to the designation of all public lands in the Northeast Ecological Corridor (66%) as a nature reserve.

Since some of the proposed residential and tourist projects would be built in public lands, the members of the Coalition for the Northeast Ecological Corridor decided to shift their lobbying efforts towards the protection of these government-owned lands administered by the Puerto Rico Department of Natural and Environmental Resources, the Puerto Rico National Parks Company, the Puerto Rico Industrial Development Company and the Puerto Rico Land Authority. To this effect, PR Senators Lorna Soto-Villanueva, Larry Seilhamer-Rodríguez, Luz M. Santiago-González, and Roger J. Iglesias-Suárez submitted on September 22, 2011, Senate Bill 2282 which was unanimously approved by the Senate on April 23, 2012, with all senators as co-authors. On May 21, 2012, the bill was approved by the House of Representatives with no opposition, and after some minor amendments, it was sent to the Governor for signature on June 18, 2012. The bill was turned into law with the signature of the Governor of Puerto Rico, becoming Law No. 126 of June 25, 2012, creating a nature reserve in all public lands within the Northeast Ecological Corridor, which cover 1,957 acres (792 hectares) or 66% of its original designated area. Upon change of administration in the 2012 November elections, lobbying efforts for protection of the entire Corridor intensified, leading to the signing of Law No. 13 of April 13, 2013 by Governor Alejandro García-Padilla.

Since its establishment, the Coalition's litigation efforts have been directed by the University of Puerto Rico's Environmental Law Clinic under Pedro Saade Llorens, Esq., one of Puerto Rico's first environmental lawyers. The Clinic's free and volunteer legal services have been instrumental in the Coalition's campaign strategies to assure that the Dos Mares and the San Miguel Resorts did not acquire government permits to commence construction. All environmental or land use permits that were awarded by government agencies to these projects were challenged in courts that until January 2012 always ruled in favor of the Coalition. Until that date, both projects did not have a single environmental or land use permit approved due to, among other actions, a lawsuit filed by the non-profit Initiative for a Sustainable Development against the Puerto Rico Planning Board. On January 4, 2012, the Puerto Rico Appeals Court issued a ruling that temporarily bared any Commonwealth of Puerto Rico agency from issuing construction permits within the proposed Northeast Ecological Corridor. This decision was reversed by the Supreme Court of Puerto Rico on January 23, 2012, although the lawsuit has turned mainly academic since passage of the law that designates all of the Corridor as a Nature Reserve. Under Law No. 13 of April 13, 2013, the Government of Puerto Rico has eight years to buy, acquire, or expropriate all private lands within the NEC.

== Ecology ==
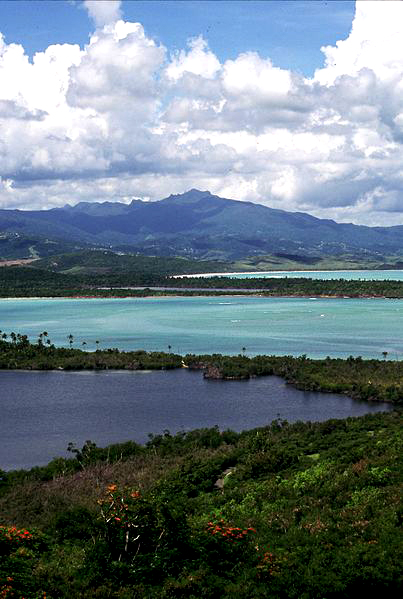
View of the Northeast Ecological Corridor and El Yunque National Forest as seen from Cabezas de San Juan Nature Reserve. In the forefront is Laguna Grande (bioluminiscent lagoon), followed by Seven Seas Beach cove, Aguas Prietas Lagoon, and El Convento Beach.

Fifty-four critical, rare, endemic and endangered species reside in this area and depend on the natural integrity of this zone for their subsistence. The Corridor is also ecologically important because it guarantees the interrelation between the mountainous rainforest found at El Yunque National Forest and the dry forest found on its coastal foothills, through a passageway of just 21 kilometers (13 miles) in length. Such an occurrence, in a very limited area, is extremely rare in any location around the world. The NEC's location within the foothills of El Yunque National Forest – a United Nations Biosphere Reserve and the only tropical rain forest within the US Forest Service system of National Forests – adds to its natural value and uniqueness.

The NEC contains a representation of all of the coastal wetlands found in PR, such as coral communities, sea grass beds, mangroves, pterocarpus forests, swamps, marshes, in addition to a coastal old-growth forest and the Aguas Prietas Lagoon, where depending on the salinity, the phenomenon of bioluminescence may occur. According to the Holdridge life zones system, the NEC contains the subtropical moist forest and the subtropical dry forest life zones. Importantly, all six ecological life zones identified in Puerto Rico are represented in a region just 21 km (13 mi) long, formed by the Northeast Ecological Corridor, Las Cabezas de San Juan Nature Reserve and El Yunque National Forest. Changes in precipitation, temperature and elevation are observed in the whole area constitute one of the most pronounced environmental gradients across the Caribbean.

Three geoclimatic zones have been identified within the NEC: these are the subtropical dry forest on alluvium soil and other unconsolidated sediments, subtropical moist forest on alluvium and other unconsolidated sediments and subtropical rainforest on volcanic rock that has been altered hydrothermically. According to the descriptions in Lugo, A. E., 2005, in the NEC there are four forest types: coastal dry forest on volcanic substrate, wet and dry forest in alluvial valleys, coastal rain forest on sandy substrate and lowland rainforest on the volcanic substrate.

The Puerto Rico GAP Analysis Project identified within the NEC 29 of the 70 land cover classes defined for the island, of which 26 correspond to the major classes of natural vegetation. Importantly, ecosystems located on the coastal plains and low hills of the NEC, represent one of the regions most impacted by anthropogenic activities in Puerto Rico. Today, this physiographic zone is one of the least protected in the island. Therefore, proponents of protected status for the NEC contend that a nature reserve designation provides an opportunity to preserve the ecological integrity of this important ecosystem while preventing habitat fragmentation; one of the main arguments that lead to nature reserve status in 2013.

=== Flora ===
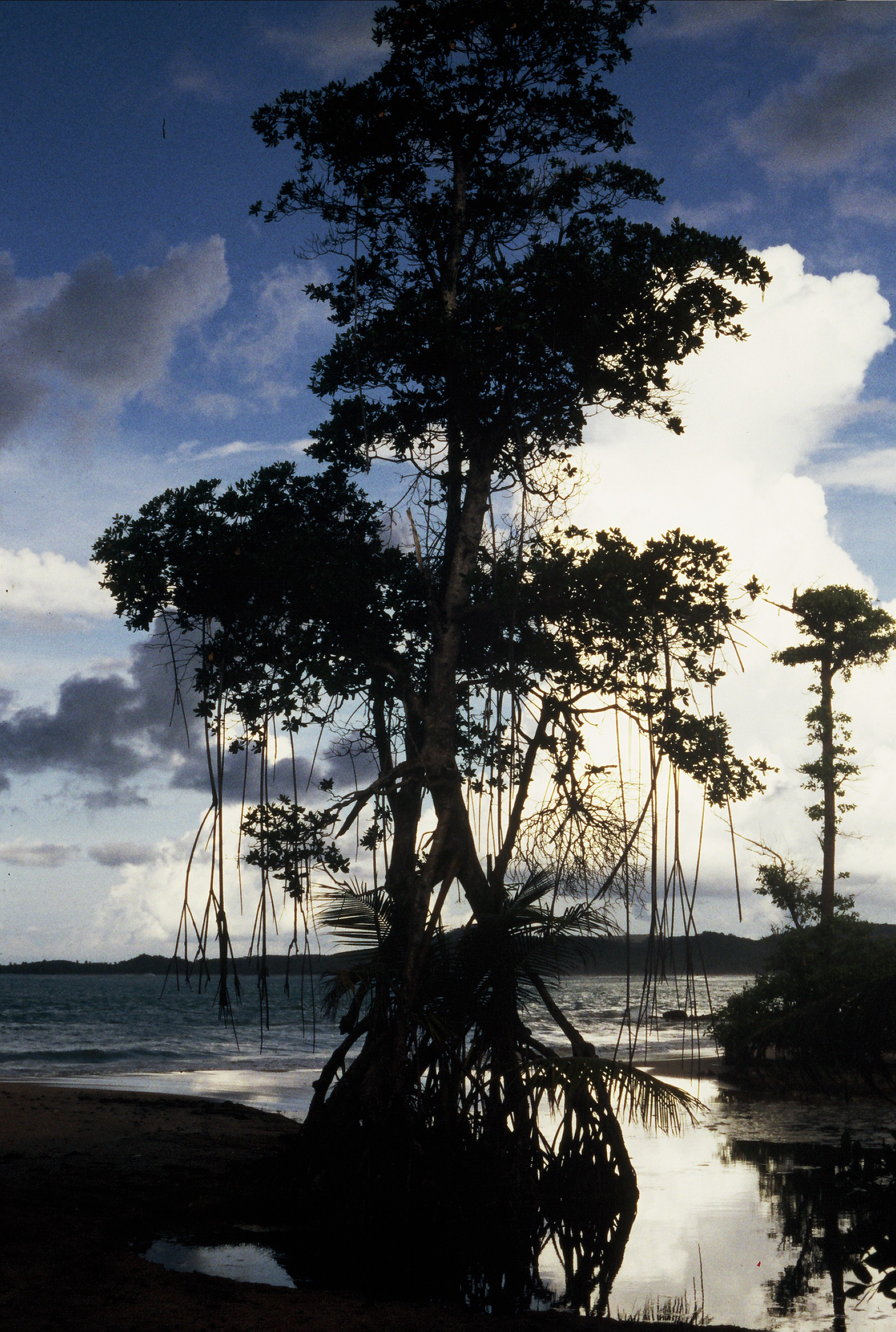
Red mangrove (Rhizophora mangle) at the Juan Martín river mouth.

The natural vegetation was classified as that typical of dry forest, shrubland, grassland and wetland. Four hundred and eighty-eight species contained in 96 families of plants have been described in the NEC. Nine of these are endemic, 400 are native and 77 introduced. The family Fabaceae is the most diverse with 65 species, followed by the Poaceae with 41. Eleven species are classified as critical by DNER's Natural Heritage Program among them: arana (Schoepfia arenaria), the black cobana (Stahlia monosperma), the beautiful goetzea (or matabuey locally) (Goetzea elegans), and the Fajardo guayabacón (Eugenia fajardensis), an endemic species whose distribution is currently limited to Vieques Island, Culebra Island and the easternmost NEC.

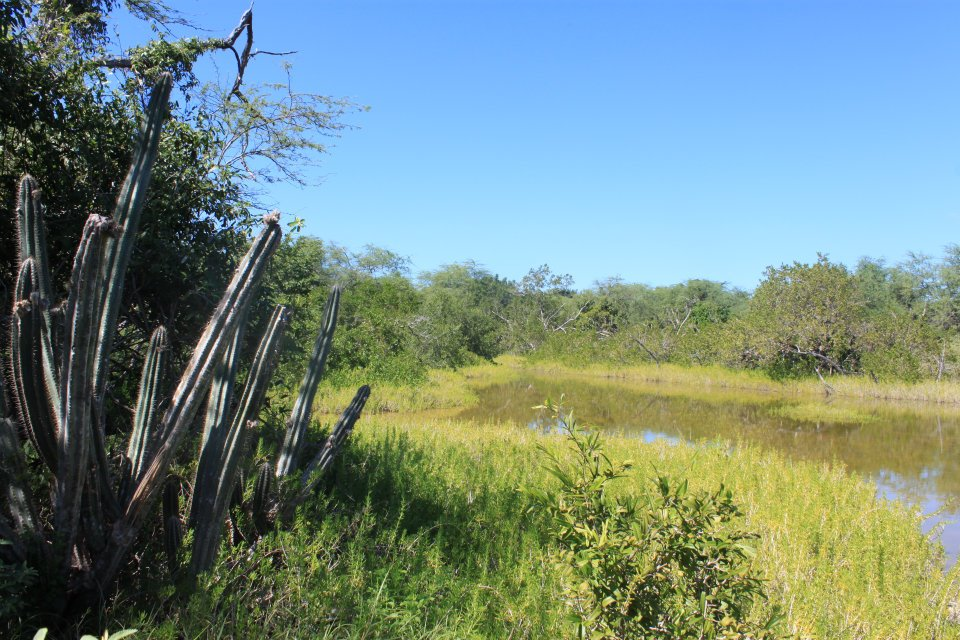
Northeast Ecological Corridor's vegetation.

In the NEC's coastal headlands to the east one may observe flora resistant to salt winds such as dwarf shrubs typical of coastal areas. In the NEC's beaches also reside species such as some varieties of cacti, the white indigoberry (also known as box briar plant or tintillo locally) (Randia aculeata), the caterpillar tree (known also as pagoda tree or alelí locally) (Plumeria alba), the Seagrape (also known as baygrape or uva de playa locally) (Coccoloba uvifera) and other prickly beach vegetation. All four types of mangrove species native to Puerto Rico may be found on these headlands: red mangrove (Rhizophora mangle), white mangrove (Laguncularia racemosa), black mangrove (Avicennia germinans), and buttonwood mangrove (Conocarpus erectus).

Towards the western part of the NEC in the segment known as El Convento there is a coastal forest older than seventy-years (rare, due to deforestation in this area) with all but one species being native. Some of the species found here are the gumbo-limbo (Bursera simaruba), the white cedar (Tabeuia heterophylla) and the ortegon (Coccoloba rugosa). Further to the west is Las Paulinas sector where the coastal valley is traversed by a gallery forest along the banks of the Juan Martín River. At the mouth of this river is one of the few remaining Pterocarpus forests in Puerto Rico, being dragonsblood tree (Pterocarpus officinalis) the prevailing species.

=== Fungi and lichens ===
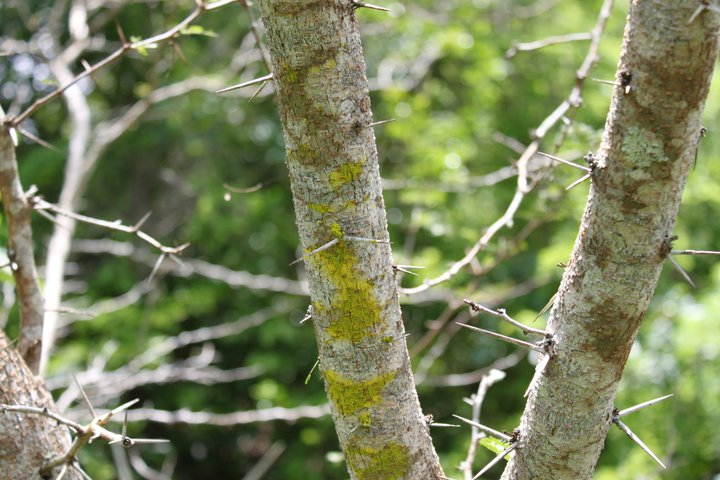
Chrysothrix Lichen

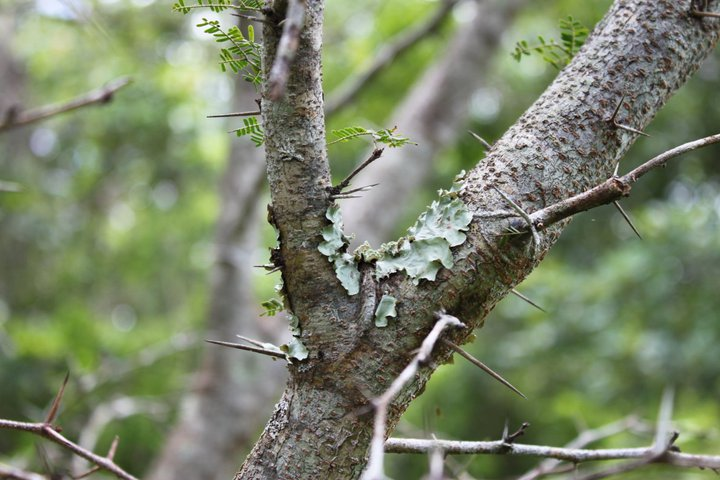
Parmotrema Lichen

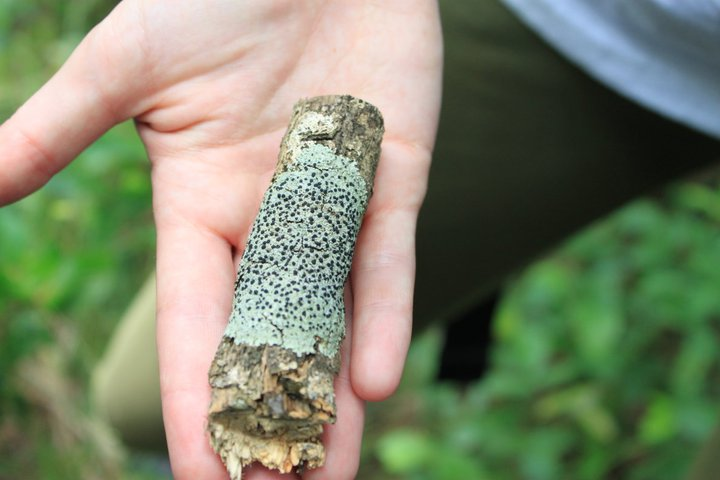
Pyxine Lichen

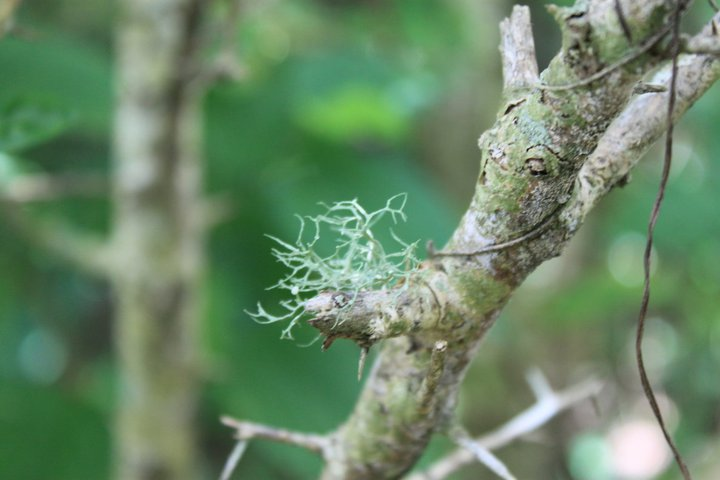
Ramalina Lichen

The Northeast Ecological Corridor's hot climate is an ideal breeding ground for fungi which, when combined with algae, forms lichens. Most forests in the NEC are relatively young (possibly between 20 and 60 years old) and have a composition of species that is characteristic of perturbed coastal rainforest in other parts of Puerto Rico. It is possible that anthropogenic activities such as agriculture, deforestation and the recurrence of fires in the NEC have been the most limiting factors regarding the development of mature forest in this region.

These factors have influenced the lichen flora of the area which is dominated by crustose lichen species followed by foliose species. Only one fruticose lichen, from the genus Ramalina, has been observed in the NEC. Among foliose lichens more prominent are several species of the genera Parmotrema, Pyxine and the very common Physcia atrostriata. Corticolous crustose lichens contribute the greatest number of species to the lichen flora within the NEC. Among these the most distinguished are species within the genera Graphis, Arthonia, Glyphis, Opegrapha, Chrysothrix, Cryptothecia, and Trypethelium. Several species of saxicolous lichens have been observed in natural areas within the NEC among which are a species of Lecanora and several Pyxine. One Bacidia species has been observed growing on leaf litter in some areas of the NEC, particularly in the hills and other areas of higher elevation. The branches of the needle bushes (Vachellia farnesiana) are particularly rich in coverage with crustose lichen, specially of those species within the family Graphidaceae.

=== Fauna ===
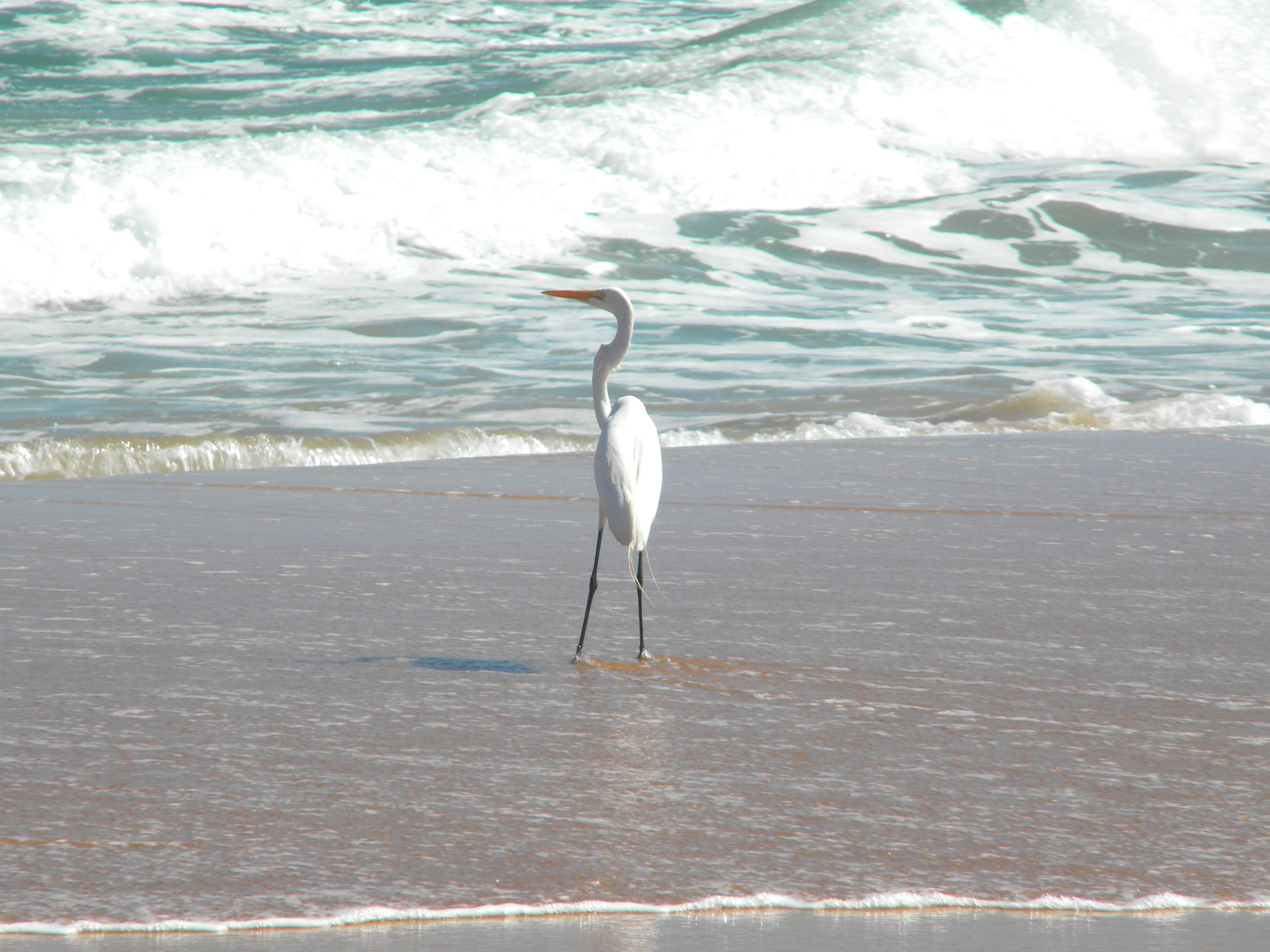
A great egret (Ardea alba) at San Miguel Beach, at the westernmost point of the Northeast Ecological Corridor.

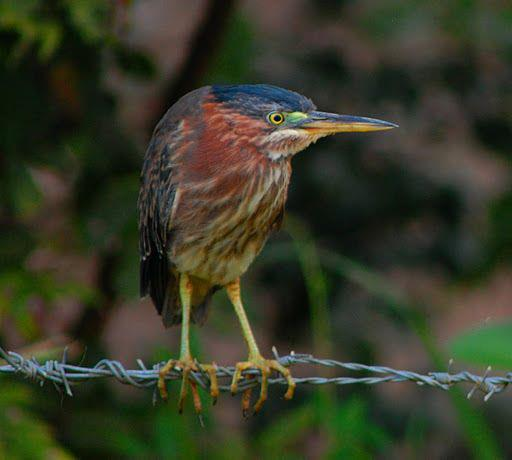
Green heron (Butorides virescens) in the Northeast Ecological Corridor.

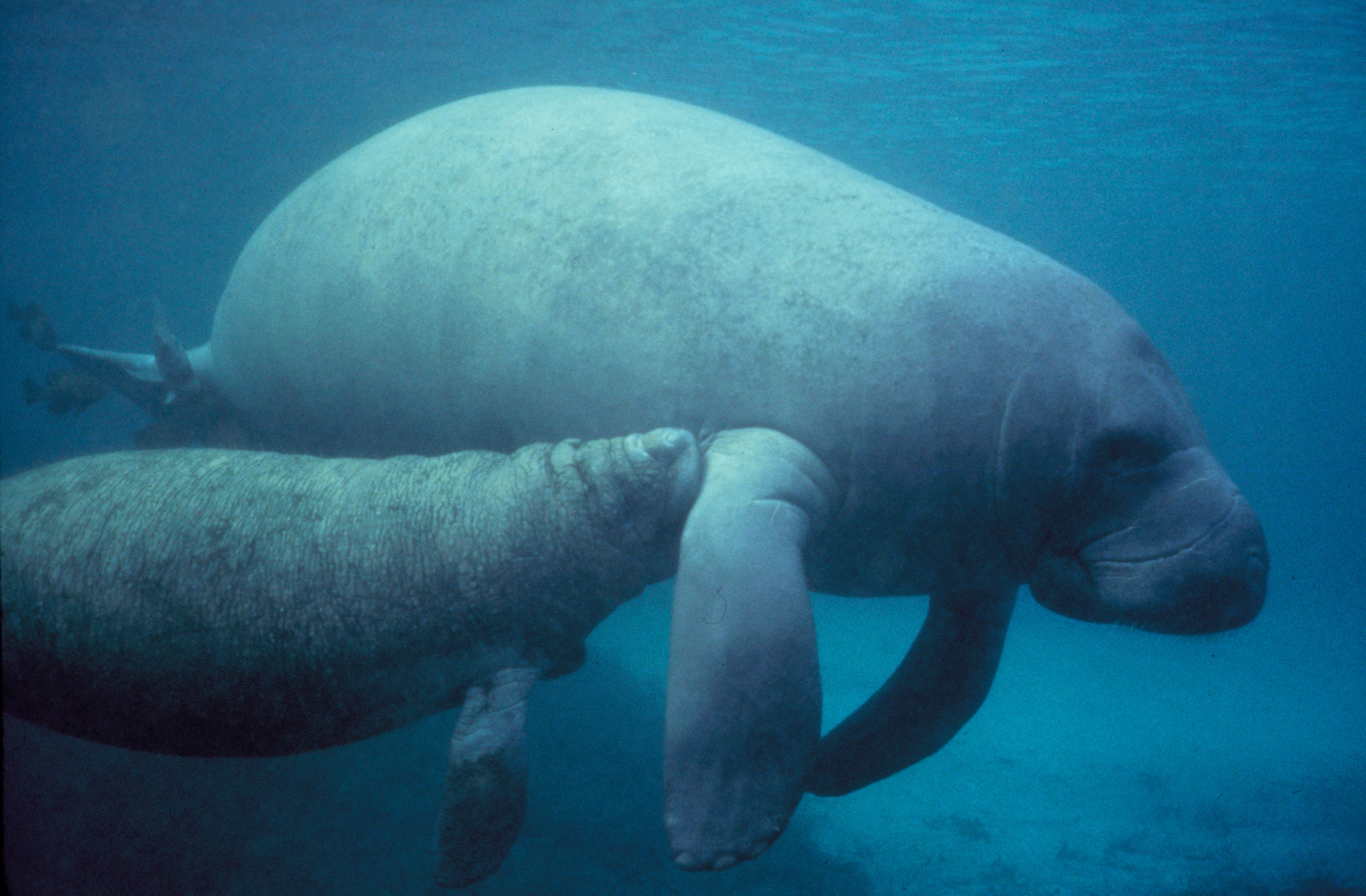
The West Indian manatee, an endangered aquatic mammal of the Caribbean.

Many species of mammals, birds, reptiles, and amphibians call the Northeast Ecological Corridor home. Some of them, like the Puerto Rican boa, the West Indian manatee and the leatherback turtle, are endangered species. It is also worth mentioning that a dinoflagellate species, Pyrodinium bahamense, resides in Aguas Prietas Lagoon and may be responsible for stationary bioluminescence events in this body of water. Laguna Grande (Lagoon), located outside of the NEC to its west, is bioluminescent year-round, due to the Pyrodinium bahamense.

The invertebrate group is represented by five phyla, 89 families and 188 species, of which 13 are endemic, 98 native and 12 exotic; 65 are of unidentified origin. The most diverse groups of invertebrates are butterflies (Lepidoptera) with 34 species of which three are endemic, and arachnids, with 30 species of which six are endemic. Regarding sub-groups, the 188 species of invertebrates found in the NEC can be divided as follows: sponges: 1, cnidaria: 12, molluscs: 9, annelids: 1, arachnids: 30, crustaceans: 18, millipedes: 6, odonate: 8, cockroaches: 5, termites: 1, Orthoptera: 5, stick insects: 2, true bugs: 11, beetles: 9, Hymenoptera: 18, flies: 15, butterflies and moths: 34, mayflies: 1, Echinoderms: 2.

Most fish in the NEC have commercial and recreational value as the mangroves act as nurseries for juvenile fish. This group has 36 native species of which four are freshwater and 32 marine. Some like mountain mullet (Agonostomus monticola) and sirajo goby (Sycidium plumieri) are amphidromic species, meaning that juveniles travel upstream to feed and breed in fresh water, and their larvae travel downstream to get to the estuaries or the ocean where they complete their development.

Three families of amphibians are found in the NEC: Bufonidae, Ranidae, and the most diverse, Leptodactylidae. Of the seven observed species, five are classified as endemic and two as introduced. The first group includes four species of the coquí frog (of the genus Eleutherodactylus) and the white-lipped froglet (Leptodactylus albilabris), all from the family Leptodactylidae; while the second group included the cane toad (also known as the marine toad) (Bufo marinus) and the bullfrog (Rana catesbeiana). All of these species are commonly found in the lowlands of Puerto Rico.

Of the eight reptilian families present in the NEC, gecko and anoles have the largest number of species. The first includes two geckos, and three salamanquita geckos, the second family consists of five lizard species. Of the total number of reptilian species documented at the NEC, 11 are endemic, five native and two introduced. An introduced iguana species and two types of boa have also been sighted. Two freshwater turtles and two species of sea turtles live in this area: the hawksbill (Eretmochelys imbricata) and the leatherback (Dermochelys coriacea), the latter which has become the emblematic species of the NEC. Of the exotic species found in the NEC the green iguana (Iguana iguana) stands out. This reptile is native to Central and South America, and introduced to Puerto Rico in the early 1970s by pet stores. Currently they are considered a pest.

The group of terrestrial vertebrates with the greatest diversity of documented species are birds. This taxon is represented by 16 orders, 43 families, 123 species. Of the 123 species reported to date, 9 are endemic, 59 residents, 39 migratory and 16 introduced. The order Passeriformes comprises the majority of families while the family Scolopacidae has the largest number of species, including 15 species of shorebirds. A total of 16 critical elements are counted in this group including the West Indian whistling duck (Dendrocygna arborea), the white-cheeked pintail (Anas bahamensis), the Kentish plover (Charadrius alexandrinus), piping plover (Charadrius melodus), roseate tern (Sterna dougallii), the American coot (Fulica americana), the Puerto Rican plain pigeon (Patagioenas inornata wetmorei) and the white-crowned pigeon (Patagioenas leucocephala). Other prevalent bird species that can be observed at NEC's beaches include the great egret (Ardea alba) and the great blue heron (Ardea herodias). A great variety of ducks can also be found to include the blue-winged teal (Anas discors), the rudy duck (Oxyura jamaicensis), besides the aforementioned West Indian whistling duck and the white-cheeked pintail. The brown pelican (Pelecanus occidentalis) also resides in this area.

Mammals are represented by six species contained in six families. Three of these species are native: the velvety free-tailed bat (Molossus molossus), the Jamaican fruit bat (Artibeus jamaicensis) and the West Indian manatee (Trichechus manatus manatus). The latter is a marine mammal threatened with extinction that uses seagrass for refuge and feeding. Among the exotic species the presence of the small Asian mongoose (Herpestes javanicus), introduced by the Spaniards to control pests, has become a threat to native and endemic fauna. Cats (Felis domesticus) and rats (Rattus norvegicus) have also been observed within NEC grounds.

==== Leatherback turtle ====
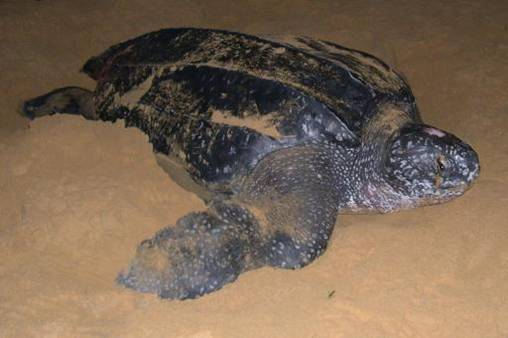
Leatherback turtle nesting at San Miguel Beach in Puerto Rico's Northeast Ecological Corridor.

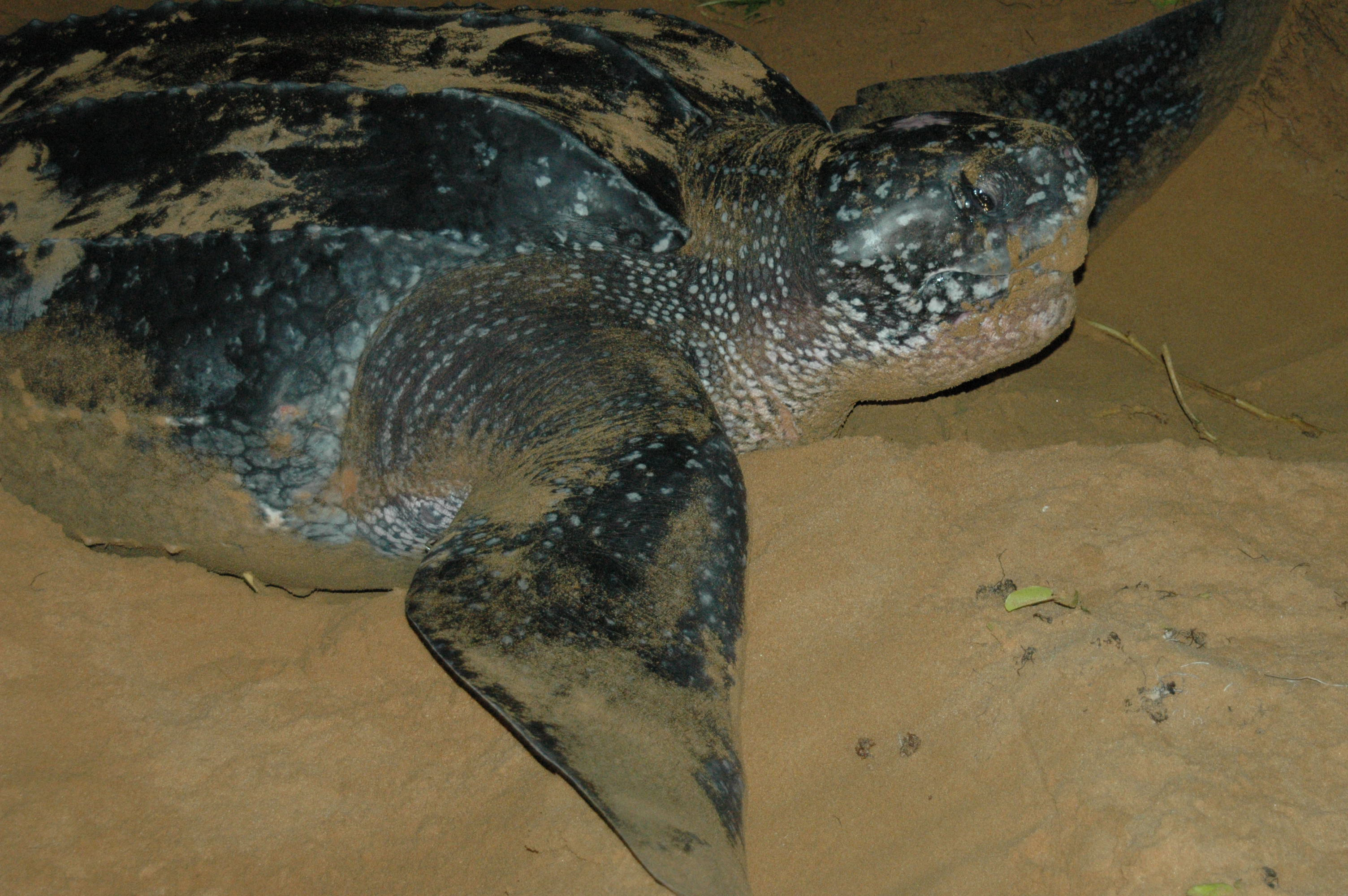
The leatherback turtle's "tears" are its way to shed excess salt.

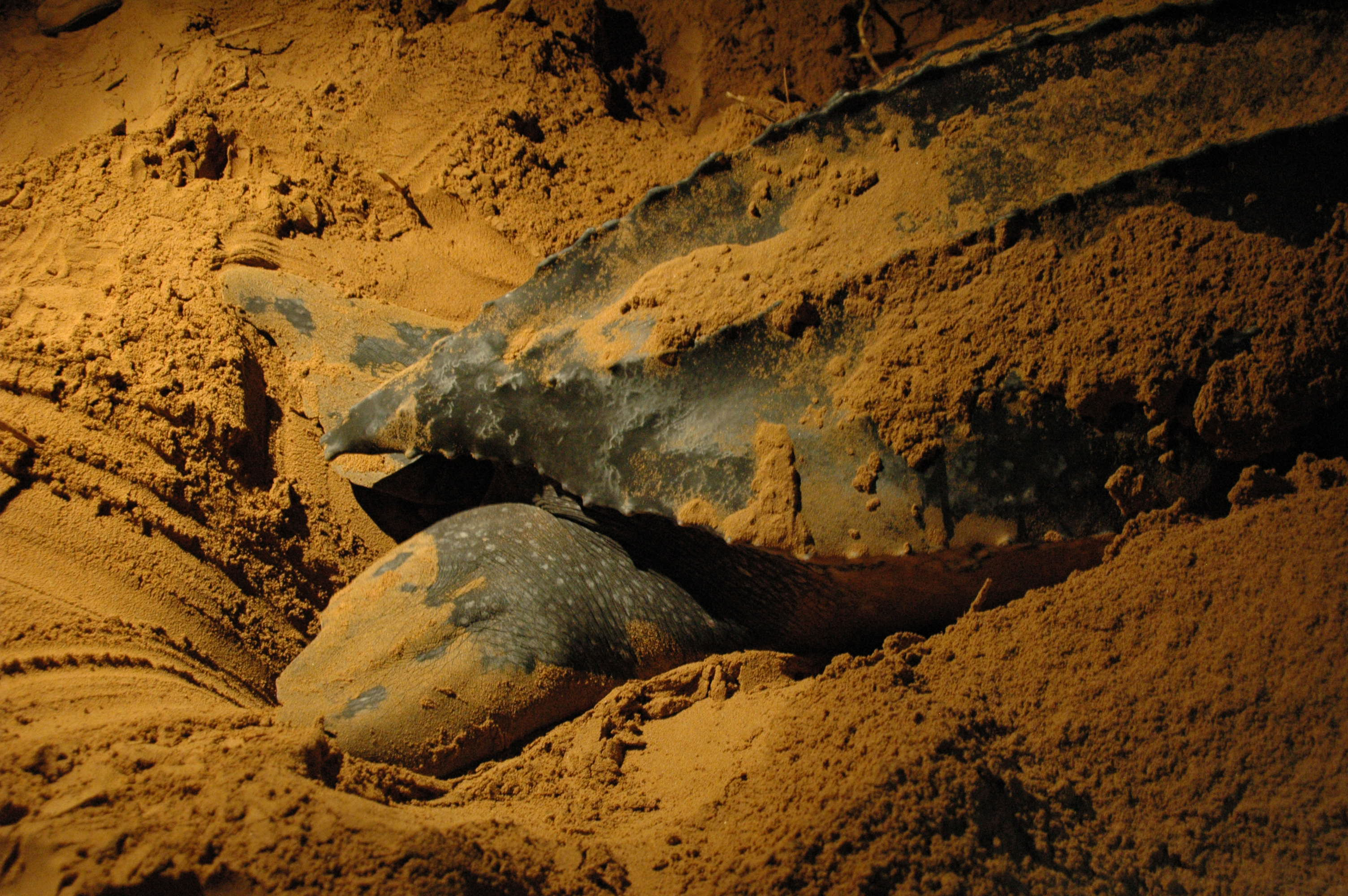
A leatherback turtle uses its rear fins to dig a nest in the sand prior to laying eggs in San Miguel Beach.

The leatherback sea turtle (Dermochelys coriacea) is the largest of all living sea turtles and the fourth largest modern reptile behind three crocodilians. It can easily be differentiated from other modern sea turtles by its lack of a bony shell. Instead, its carapace is covered by skin and oily flesh. Dermochelys coriacea is the only extant species of the family Dermochelyidae.

The NEC is a critical nesting habitat for the leatherback sea turtle and one of the three most important nesting sites for this species in the United States and its territories as confirmed by US Fish and Wildlife Service. Data gathered by the Puerto Rico Department of Natural and Environmental Resources in its nest inventory conducted from 1993 to 2007 shows a count of 3,188 nests with an average of 213 leatherback nests per year. The year with the lowest count was 1993, for a total of 79, and the year with the largest count was 2007, with 411 reported nests. San Miguel Beach was the site with the highest count, for a total of 1,181 during the survey period, followed by Las Paulinas with 1,159 and El Convento with 848.

The leatherback turtle is the largest marine turtle in the world, and has been federally listed as endangered since 1970.

=== Land ===
Ecologically important lands in Northeast Puerto Rico to include El Yunque National Forest and the Northeast Ecological Corridor.

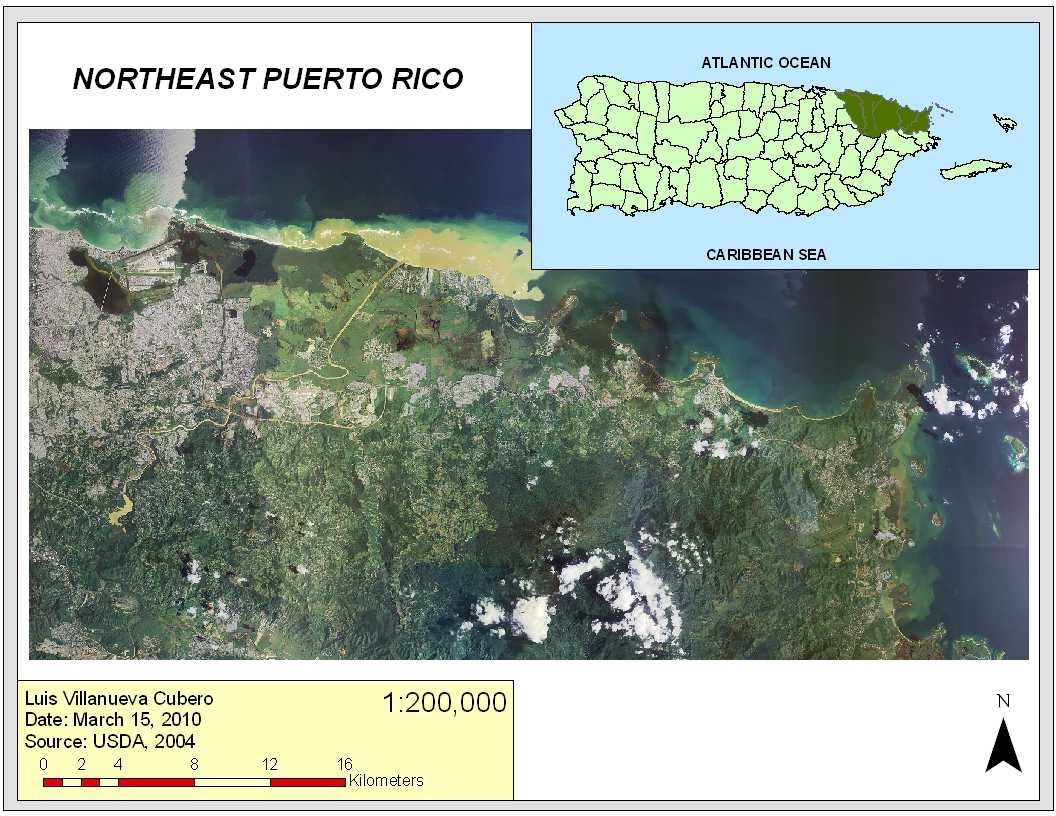
Aerial photo of Northeast Puerto Rico.

Vast sugar cane plantations once comprised some of the lands which now lie within the NEC. After the abandonment of such lands, as the sugar industry decayed in Puerto Rico, reforestation occurred. Nevertheless, at a hill near El Convento Beach vegetation consistent with old-growth forest that is at least seventy years old is present. The NEC has various beaches, some of them coveted by those beach-goers looking for solace and surfers; these include: San Miguel, Las Paulinas, El Convento (North), El Convento (South), La Selva, Escondida, Colorá and Seven Seas.

The NEC lies north of El Yunque National Forest and it is surmised that it generates part of the humidity required so that it remains a tropical rainforest as it is carried by tradewinds. In the 21-kilometer (13-mile) region comprised by Northeast Ecological Corridor, Cabezas de San Juan Nature Reserve and El Yunque National Forest all six life zones identified in Puerto Rico are contained, a rare natural phenomenon. The changes in precipitation, elevation and temperature observed in this zone constitute one of the most eclectic environmental gradients in all of the Caribbean. This has fomented an extraordinary biodiversity in this region.

The rainforests on volcanic substrate are transition zones between wet and dry forests in the coastal valleys, which lie on alluvial and sandy substratum, similar to those found in the lowlands in the NEC; and lower montane wet forests and rainforests on volcanic substrate, such as those in El Yunque National Forest. They have suffered great clearing in Puerto Rico, making it difficult to find natural stands. Endemic species like the Puerto Rican owl (Gymnasio nudipes) regularly inhabit this vegetation association. This bird has not been documented within the NEC, so that the restoration of this ecosystem might provide an opportunity to reintroduce this and other species in the area, thereby enhancing connectivity between coastal and mountainous region east of the island.

There are approximately ten access routes and several dirt roads used, mostly by local residents, to enter the beaches or forest areas for recreation. Not all access routes are suitable for four-wheeled vehicles.

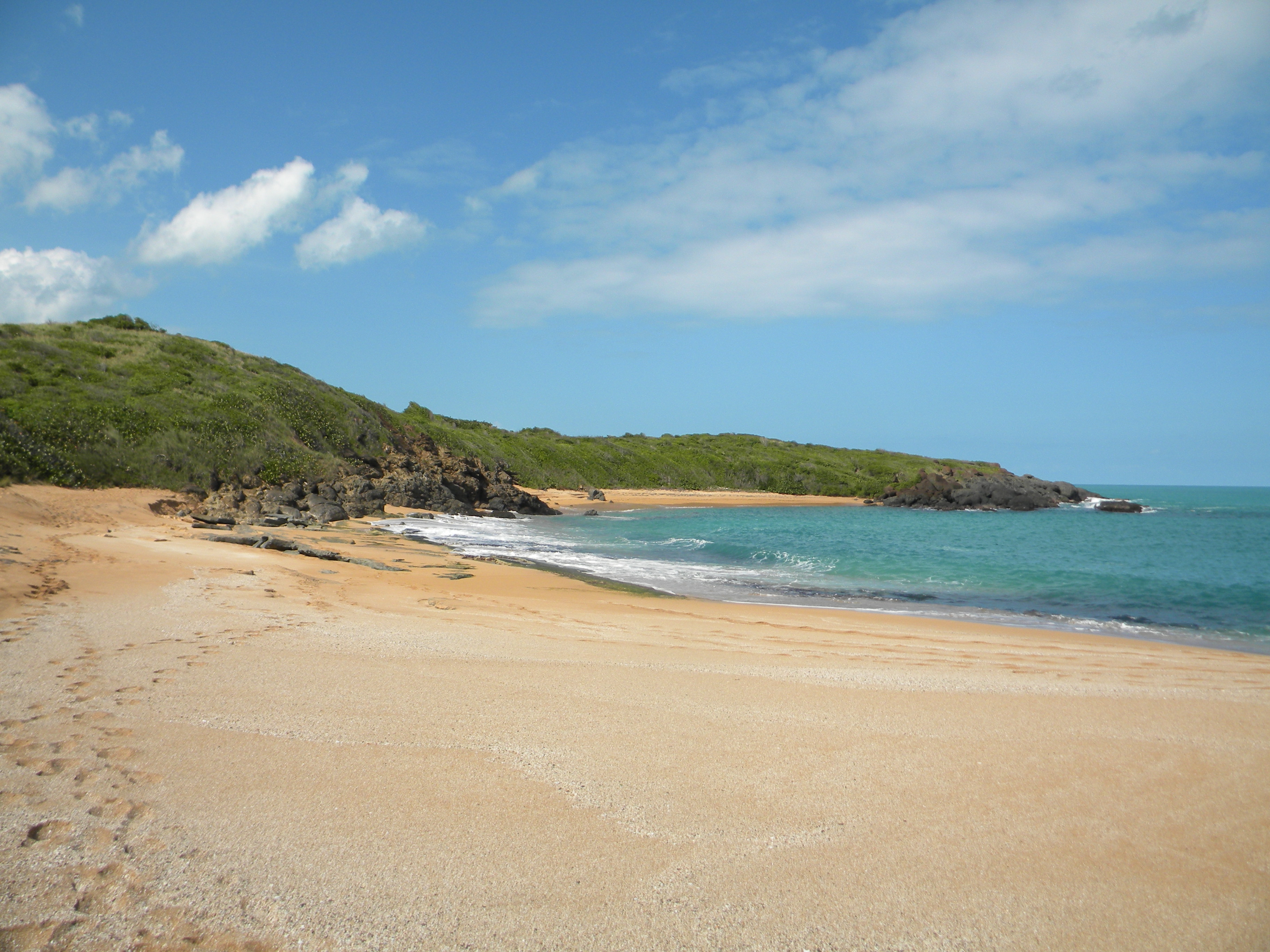
Colorá Beach, Fajardo, Puerto Rico, located near the easternmost tip of the Northeast Ecological Corridor.

=== Climate ===
The high level of rainfall makes Northeast Puerto Rico a relatively wet spot; November is when it rains the most and the driest month is March. Summer brings highs in the lower 30s°C (90s°F), which descend down into the lower 20s°C (70s°F) at night. Throughout the Winter, highs are in the upper 20s°C (80s°F), which sink to the mid-teens°C (60s°F) during nighttime.

In the NEC three geoclimatic zones have been identified. These are the subtropical dry forest on alluvium and other unconsolidated sediments, subtropical moist forest on alluvium and other unconsolidated sediments and subtropical rainforest on volcanic rock altered by hydrothermal vents.

== Miscellaneous ==
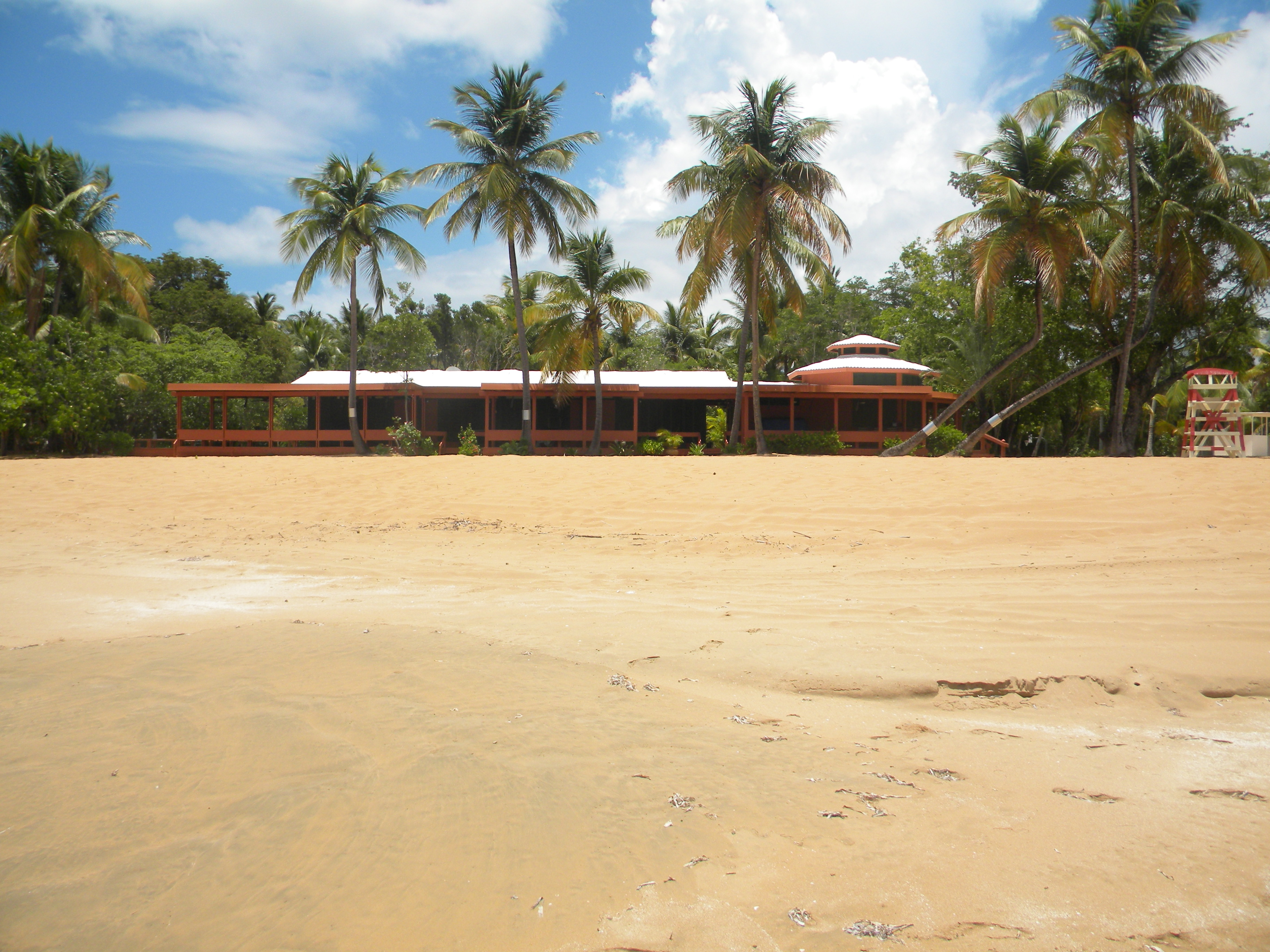
Puerto Rico Governor's official beach house, located in El Convento Beach, in the municipality of Fajardo.

A species of chiton collected originally in 1985 in Las Cabezas de San Juan Nature Reserve, near the NEC was confirmed to be a new species in 2010, named (Lepidochitona Rufoi) in honor of marine biologist Rufo M. Vega-Pagán.

Various scenes from Hollywood movies were filmed at NEC including: Che, The Rum Diary, as well as Syfy Channel's version of Treasure Island that premiered in 2012 and Teen Beach Movie shot in 2013.

At El Convento Beach, along the kilometers-long undeveloped coastline stretching between Fajardo and Luquillo lies the governor's official beach house, Playa El Convento, a rustic wooden cottage.

== See also ==
- El Yunque National Forest
- Puerto Rican Dry Forests – Ecoregion
- Puerto Rican Moist Forests – Ecoregion
- List of Puerto Rico State Forests
