= Pharmaceutical industry in Puerto Rico =

Prominent industry of Puerto Rico

The pharmaceutical industry in Puerto Rico encompasses more than half of all manufacturing done in Puerto Rico. As the island's most prominent industry, pharmaceutics generates more than 18,000 jobs, pays more than US$3 billion in taxes, comprises about half of total exports, and has generated more than 25% of the island's GDP for the past four decades. Comparatively, Puerto Rico is the fifth largest area in the world for pharmaceutical manufacturing with more than 80 plants, including:

- Abbott
- Amgen
- AstraZeneca
- Baxter
- BD
- Biovail
- Bristol Myers Squibb
- Cardinal Health
- Eli Lilly
- GlaxoSmithKline (GSK)
- Ivax
- Johnson & Johnson
- Merck Sharp & Dohme
- Mylan
- Novartis
- Patheon
- Pfizer
- Procter & Gamble
- Schering Plough
- Warner Chilcott
- Watson
- Wyeth

Pharmaceutical companies originally came to Puerto Rico in the late 1960s and 1970s to take advantage of the now-expired federal tax incentive known as Section 936. This incentive allowed U.S.-based manufacturers to send all profits from local plants to stateside parent plants without having to pay any federal taxes.

Several developments in the market, however, pose a challenge to the industry. These challenges include expired patents, cheaper manufacturers (such as those in Brazil, China, India, and South Korea), the rise of generic drugs, and high production costs.

In terms of market share, as of 2014, Puerto Rico produces sixteen of the top twenty selling drugs in the mainland United States.

As a result of critical shortages of imported material during the 2020 COVID-19 pandemic in the United States efforts were made by Trump and other politicians to reincentivize Puerto Rican pharmaceutical production.
