= Mary Scheier =

American artist (1908–2007)

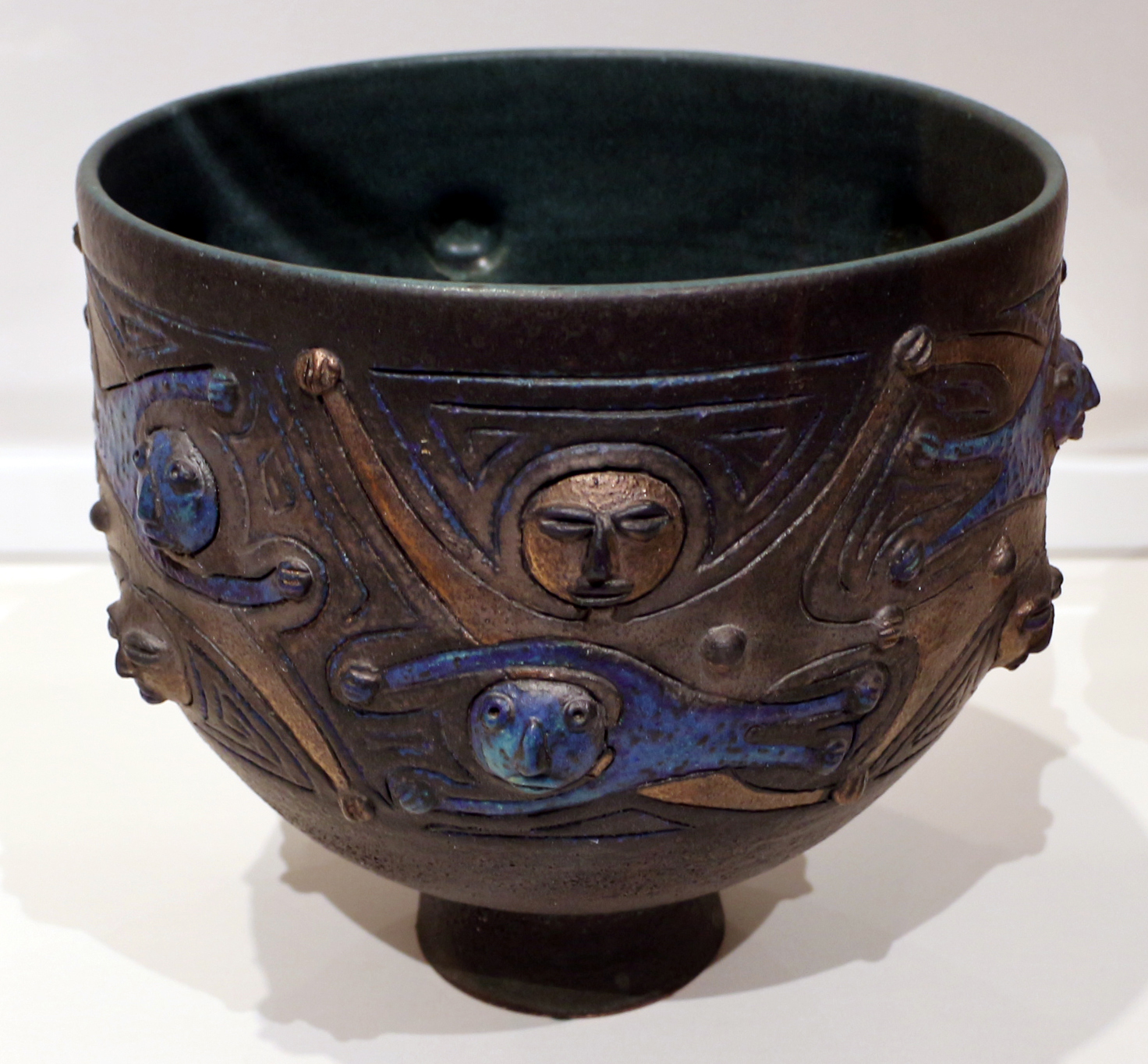
Edwin and Mary Scheier, bowl, 1959 ca.

Mary Scheier (née Mary Goldsmith; May 9, 1908 – May 14, 2007) was a noted American ceramicist, and the wife and artistic partner of Edwin Scheier.

== Career ==
Born Mary Goldsmith in Salem, Virginia, she moved to New York City in 1925 and studied art at the Art Students League of New York, the Grand Central School of Art and the New York School of Fine and Applied Arts. After a brief advertising career in Paris, she returned to Virginia and married Edwin Scheier in August 1937. She was head of a WPA gallery at Big Stone Gap, Virginia when they met during the Great Depression.

In 1939, the Scheiers set up their first studio, Hillcrock Pottery, in Glade Spring, VA, making small sculptures and functional pottery using local clays.

In 1940, they moved to Durham, New Hampshire, and both taught at the University of New Hampshire until 1968. She was an Artist-in-Residence at the University of New Hampshire, Durham, during the 1940s and 1950s. Sharing her husband's campus studio, Mary also replaced her husband when he served in the military during the Second World War.

They then moved to the Mexican state of Oaxaca. Mary stopped producing pottery in the 1960s, when arthritis and health conditions prevented her from continuing. They finally moved to Green Valley, Arizona. She died in Tucson, Arizona.

Her work is in the collections of the Metropolitan Museum of Art, the Brooklyn Museum, the American Craft Museum and the University of New Hampshire Special Collections.

Mary died just five days after celebrating her 99th birthday and after 69 years of marriage to Edwin.

== Style ==
Mary was well known for her skills in creating thin walled thrown vessels. Combining her products with Edwin's applied designs and custom created glazes gained the couple wide recognition. She also created pieces that resembled pottery from the Sung dynasty, an era she admired.

Mary focused on themes concerning primitive and biblical imagery, including topics of "human behaviour from Adam and Eve, birth, temptation to protection, motherhood and coupling with some of the designs showing people within people, womb-like or within animals."

== Documentary ==
Mary Goldsmith and husband Scheier were the subjects of Ken Browne's film Four Hands, One Heart, which aired repeatedly on PBS stations.

Goldsmith, with Scheier, was also the subject of a chapter of Lyndel King's 1988 book, "American Studio Ceramics: 1920-1950" published by the University Art Gallery at the University of Minnesota.
