= Edwin Scheier =

American ceramicist (1910–2008)

- Born: Edwin Scheier; November 11, 1910; The Bronx, New York, U.S.
- Died: April 20, 2008 (aged 97); Green Valley, Arizona, U.S.
- Education: Self-trained, free seminars at Cooper Union
- Known for: Pottery, Sculpture, Computer graphics, Weaving.
- Movement: American craft and Modernist

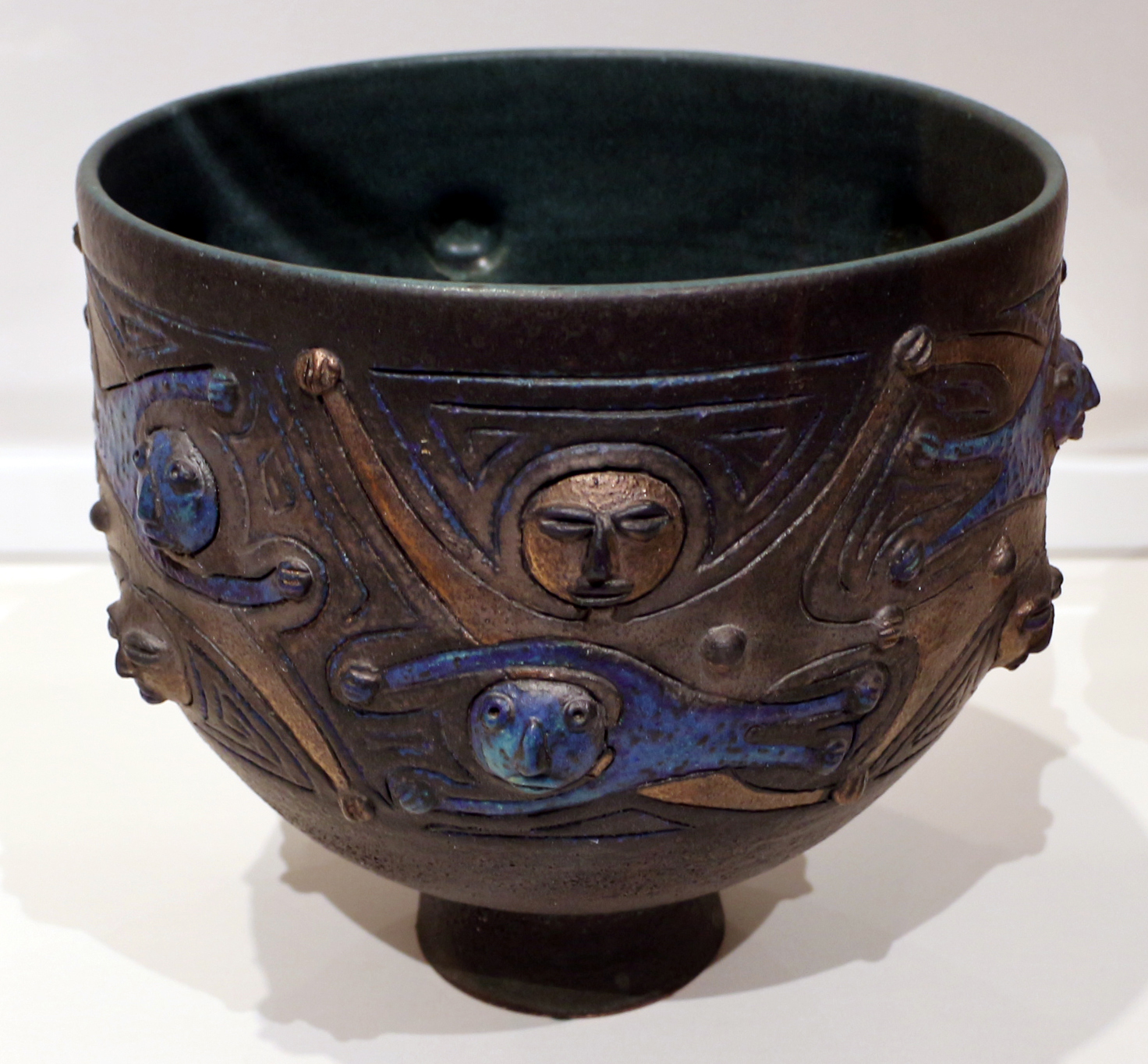
Edwin and Mary Scheier, bowl, 1959

Edwin Scheier (November 11, 1910 – April 20, 2008) was an American artist, best known for his ceramic works with his wife, Mary Scheier.

== Early life ==
Edwin Scheier was born in The Bronx, New York City, to a Jewish German immigrant father, and an American mother. Scheier's father died shortly after his son's birth. Although his mother remarried, Scheier was left to his own devices, and dropped out of school before high school, in order to make a living. During the Great Depression, he criss-crossed the nation before returning to New York City.

Although never formally trained, Scheier attended free seminars at Cooper Union, and also worked for a silversmith and a ceramicist. He often examined works in the city's museums, and first, and briefly, met his future wife, Mary Goldsmith, in the Metropolitan Museum of Art. A period as a public puppeteer led him to take a position teaching crafts through the WPA. This led to other positions in the WPA, and it was through one of these roles, as a field supervisor of craft programs, that he again met Mary, who was directing a ceramics studio at the Big Stone Gap Federal Art Gallery in Abingdon, Virginia. They were married on August 19, 1937, eventually resigned their posts with the WPA, and after a period as itinerant puppeteers, established a long-term partnership as fine ceramicists.

== New Hampshire ==
As the Scheiers learned to collaborate, with Edwin's sculptural work being bonded to Mary's thrown works, their reputations grew. They received an offer to take positions at the University of New Hampshire, where Mary became Artist-in-Residence. The couple taught there for over 20 years before moving to Mexico to study Oaxacan Indian arts and crafts.

During the summer of 1945, the Scheiers were invited to travel to Puerto Rico to train ceramic arts students, for a small pottery that the Puerto Rican government intended to establish. The Scheiers visited briefly, after which an administrator of the Puerto Rico Industrial Development Company, or PRIDECO, traveled in America with Edwin, learning more about the ceramics industry.

== Oaxaca ==
The Scheiers spent most of the 1960s in Oaxaca. They examined, studied, and learned the techniques of the Zapotec peoples in weaving, painting, sculpture, and pottery. Many of Edwin's themes are enhanced in these mediums by the play of positive and negative space.

== Later life ==
After years in Oaxaca, the Scheiers returned to the United States, settling in Green Valley, Arizona, where Edwin and Mary resided until their deaths. Until about a year before his death Edwin continued to create art work, though due to age and health, he was then creating "computer paintings" in his studio. The computer paintings came about primarily out of frustration and his deep desire to create. Though his heart would no longer allow him to lift heavy blocks of clay, his mind was still active. On an impulse he went to a computer store, purchased a computer, a color ink jet printer, and a graphical sketch pad - from this he began to create what he would call "computer paintings." As with pottery, his use of the computer was self-taught. Here was a man in his early 90s starting a new artistic method. He did not ask for help, he just did it.

Filmmaker Ken Browne examined the lives and works of the Scheiers in his 2000 documentary, Four Hands, One Heart.

Mary died in May 2007 at 99. Edwin died less than a year later in April 2008 at the age of 97.

About 40 pieces of the Scheiers' work are on display at the University of New Hampshire Library, and the couple's work is also found in the permanent collection of the Currier Museum of Art and the Herberger College of the Arts at Arizona State University. Their works have also been shown at the Newark Museum, Minneapolis Institute of Arts, and the Cranbrook Art Museum.

== Themes and motifs ==
Edwin Scheier's work often employed symbols for life, birth, and rebirth. The figures applied to the thrown vessels often involve people within people, womb-like, or within animals. Scheier often utilized stylistic techniques learned during his time in Oaxaca. His designs were often compared to those of Pablo Picasso and Paul Klee but ultimately, as an artist, they were his own. In 1988, Edward Lebow described Scheier's figure work as showing “the humorous lyrical primitivism of the personal subconscious.”
