= Plaza del Atlántico =

Shopping mall in Arecibo, Puerto Rico

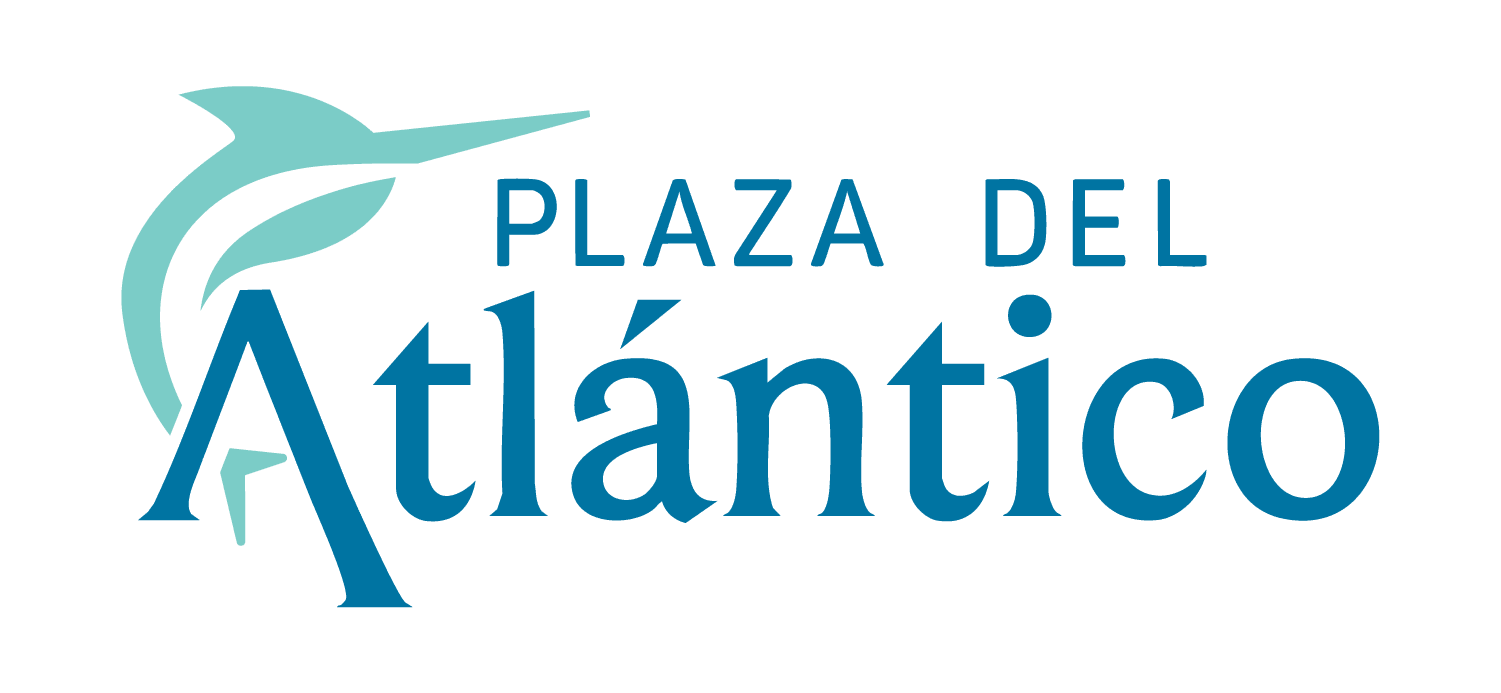
- Location: Arecibo, Puerto Rico
- Coordinates: 18°28′43″N 66°45′24″W
- Address: 1400 Av. Miramar, Arecibo, 00612
- Opened: 14 November 1980 (original indoor mall only) 2025 (current open-air shopping center)
- Closed: 2025 (original indoor mall)
- Developer: Plaza del Atlántico Associates
- Manager: Curzon Puerto Rico
- Owner: Curzon Puerto Rico
- Architect: Martorell, Borgos & Associates
- Num. of stores: 40+ (at peak) 6 as of now (Outparcel Tenants + Capri)
- Num. of anchor tenants: 4
- Floor area: 225,000 sq ft (20,900 m^{2})
- Floors: 1
- Parking: 1,100+
- Website: curzon.pr/plaza-del-atlantico/

Plaza del Atlántico is a open-air shopping mall located in Arecibo, Puerto Rico. Anchored by Tiendas Capri, Burlington, and Marshalls. And coming soon Ross Dress For Less and Golden Corral

== History ==
=== Development and opening: 1970s-1980s ===
On May 12, 1979, it was reported that the construction of Arecibo's first enclosed shopping mall had been announced that week by the firm Plaza del Atlántico Associates, which intended to develop the 225,000 square foot center on a 16.8-acre property in Arecibo, at a cost of more than $10 million. Plaza del Atlántico would house between 35 and 40 commercial establishments in a total of 197,000 square feet of stores connected by an impressive central corridor (mall) of more than 22,000 square feet. It was anticipated that the new shopping center would attract businesses that have never been established in Arecibo before, but at the same time it will include numerous local businesses helping to decongest traffic in the center of that town. Of the businesses that were already confirmed to be in the shopping mall once opened at the time included anchors Barkers, Grand Union, and in addition, a Franklins store. Other businesses with which there were negotiations included Walgreens, Madison Shop, Kinney Shoes, Rahola Photography, Gordon's Jewelers, Thom McAnn, Lerner Shops, Almacenes Rodríguez and others. The commercial spaces in Plaza del Atlántico ranged from stores of about 75,000 square feet to small spaces, with numerous medium-sized establishments between 5,000 and 10,000 feet. The shopping center would have parking spaces for about 1,100 cars, in addition to 15 spaces for commercial cargo. Plaza del Atlántico Mall, being the first to be built on the north coast from Bayamón to Mayagüez, would be enclosed, with air conditioning, skylights for natural light and seating, with permanent kiosks and numerous "planters." The mall was designed by the consulting firm of Martorell, Borgos & Associates, whose experience in shopping centers included the designs of the Señorial Plaza, Ponce Mall, Rexville, the Barkers and Velasco stores in Plaza Carolina, and others. EAG, Architects and Engineers which would be in charge of construction, estimated that the mall would be completed in one year, from the beginning of the work that they hoped to begin within those next 30 days. Plaza del Atlántico Associates would be the owner of the project, whose parent company, Cornwall Equities, also operated the Señorial Plaza and Rexville shopping centers in Bayamón in Puerto Rico. The firm was also the main owner of the chain of Barkers and Franklins stores that operated on the island. Barkers would be the largest store in Plaza del Atlántico with a capacity of almost 75,000 square feet, which would make it one of the largest stores of the chain in Puerto Rico.

On January 18, 1980, it was reported that Plaza del Atlántico would be opening that next summer, the mall by this time was in an advanced stage of development. The construction of the 225,000 square foot center represented an investment of around $8 million and was started late that last year. It would have more than 35 stores, the stores of which were confirmed to integrate it were Barkers, Lerner Shops, Thom McAnn, Grand Union Supermarket, Kinney Shoes, Gordons, Rahola, Almacenes Rodriguez, Madison Shop, Pearle Vision Center, Almacenes Kress, Walgreens, Value Slacks, Tads Men's Store, Almacenes Karlo, and others. There would also be establishments for light food service.

On August 2, 1980, it was reported that the Barkers store at the mall had opened, this became the 15th Barkers store in Puerto Rico at the time. Mr. Sol Kittay, owner of Cornwall Equities, then parent company of Barkers stores, would cut the ribbon during the opening of the new store.

On November 14, 1980, the Plaza del Atlántico shopping mall would be reported to open that day at 5:30 PM, it would be classified as the largest development project that had been carried out in the Arecibo area during those last 15 years. Plaza del Atlántico Associates, then owners and operators of the shopping mall, invited the Puerto Rican public to join the center's official opening activities when most of the 40 commercial establishments in the mall would be open. The simple ceremony would consist of a symbolic opening by the management of the shopping center and representatives of the different stores in the mall, as well as personalities from the community and the local government. One of the very first businesses to open its doors to the public in Plaza del Atlántico was the Barkers department store, one of its anchor tenants. One of the other establishments that closely followed the opening of the Barkers store was Land of Oz, an arcade. The first of these establishments to open its doors in Plaza del Atlántico, that last August, was the Burger King chain, whose establishment on the parking area of the mall reported a large amount of public traffic throughout that week. A Church's Fried Chicken establishment was also in an advanced stage of construction during this time, which would also be located in the parking area of the mall. Among other establishments that had been opening to the public during that month of October in Plaza del Atlántico included Almacenes Karlo, Madison Shops, Marianne, Kinney Shoes, Thom McAn, Almacenes Rodríguez, Bakers Shoes, La Favorita, Butler Shoes, Zales Jewelers and Gordon's Jewelers. Another group of important stores were advancing in their construction and decoration to open their establishments during that month of November during this time, this included Almacenes Kress, Valú Slacks, Galo Corporation, Rahola, Centro Disco and Central Federal Savings. The opening of a 9,000 square foot Walgreens pharmacy was also expected during that month of November. In addition, a Pearle Vision Center and a Génesis store were also under construction, whose opening date had not been determined, but were expected to open before that Christmas. At an advanced stage of construction during this time in Plaza del Atlántico was the first Grand Union supermarket for the Arecibo area. Its location would be the second largest in Plaza del Atlántico, with more than 26,000 square feet of space, the opening of the Grand Union location had not been announced by this point. Plaza del Atlántico would be a commercial development of the company K-Real Management, Inc., which operated different other shopping centers in Puerto Rico at the time. Its subsidiary in Puerto Rico, K-Real Management of Puerto Rico, Inc., would be in charge of the construction administration of the shopping mall, with the firm Gerrits de Puerto Rico, Inc., acting as general contractors. More than 30 subcontractors and suppliers would participate in the construction of Plaza del Atlántico. The rental of the shopping mall would be in charge of the firm Wilder Manley.

On October 20, 1983, after the acquiring of 5 Barkers stores on the island by the Kmart Corporation after the bankruptcy of the Barkers chain, a new Kmart store would inaugurate at Plaza del Atlántico in the former Barkers space.

=== Remodel and success: 1990s-2000s ===
In mid November 1994, Plaza del Atlántico would finish remodeling under the ownership of Manley Berenson. These renovations begun in 1993. These renovations would bring neons, mirrored ceilings, and pastel tiles to the mall corridors among other things.

In January 2005, Plaza del Atlántico would be acquired by DDR Corp. from a $1.15 billion portfolio deal with Caribbean Property Group (CPG) which included the mall.

In February 2007, Plaza del Atlántico would be anchored by a Big Kmart and a Tiendas Capri. The tenant mix within the mall consisted of national, regional, and local retailers which included Foot Locker, GameStop, Payless ShoeSource, RadioShack, Shoe Zone, Donato's, Tiendas Kress, Kress Kids and Me Salve, among others.

=== Downfall, and redevelopment: 2010's and on ===
On May 31, 2017, it was reported that Payless Shoe Source would be closing 13 stores, this included the store at Plaza del Atlántico.

In December 2017, DDR Corp. spun off its Puerto Rican shopping centers to RVI (Retail Value Inc.) due to struggles they had after the Hurricane Maria, making Retail Value Inc. the new owner of Plaza del Atlántico at the time.

On November 6, 2019, it was reported that TransformCo, the parent company of Sears and Kmart had announced an additional eight Sears and Kmart stores which would be closing in Puerto Rico. This would include the Kmart store at Plaza del Atlántico.

In August 2021, Developers Diversified (DDR Corp.) came back to the PR retail landscape with a $550 million deal with RVI of which Plaza del Atlántico was included in, making DDR the current owner of the mall once again.

On May 10, 2023, it was reported that Curzon Puerto Rico, an affiliate of Curzon Advisers, was now the owner of one of the largest shopping center portfolios in Puerto Rico, formerly owned by Developers Diversified (DDR Corp.) which had acquired it again in 2021. In this portfolio of 9 shopping centers, Plaza del Atlantico was included, making Curzon Puerto Rico the new owners of the mall. As also reported, under the new ownership of Curzon Puerto Rico, and due to the decline of the mall in recent years it was proposed for the mall to be redeveloped as an open air shopping center, although it was still in the design and negotiations stage; they are to begin with the project in 2024 up to 2025. Plaza del Atlántico is said to have an “obsolete” format in today’s standards. Another factor that has been accredited to the decline of the mall is its last remaining anchor tenant doesn’t have direct access to the interior of the mall. The redevelopment of the mall is going to consist of eliminating the inside corridor and turning it into a power center with spaces of between 15,000 square feet and 30,000 square feet. Aside from Capri, which is the current last remaining anchor tenant, between five and seven new stores could be added to the mall with the construction starting next year. The mall currently sits at 37% occupancy of leased spaces, much lower than all other Curzon Puerto Rico shopping center properties.

On January 15, 2025, it was announced by Curzon Puerto Rico that Plaza del Atlántico would begin remodeling. Officially preparing itself to begin converting the former enclosed mall to an outdoor shopping center. During this time Tiendas Capri, and out parcels Burger King, Church’s Chicken, and Taco Bell would remain open.

On March 6, 2026, Burlington opened a 31,771 square foot store at the shopping center. This came to fruition as the store was announced back in 2025 in tandem with the redevelopment efforts of the shopping center.

On August 11, 2026, it was reported that Marshalls would be opening its new store at the shopping center on August 13. Which would be the second Marshalls store in Arecibo.
