= Centro del Sur Mall =

Shopping mall in Ponce, Puerto Rico

- Location: Ponce, Puerto Rico
- Coordinates: 18.01167°N 66.61444°W
- Opened: 27 June 1962
- Developer: IBEC Realty Company
- Owner: CCM
- Architect: Santiago Castrodad
- Num. of stores: 80+
- Num. of anchor tenants: 2
- Floor area: 350,000 square feet (32,516 m^{2})
- Floors: 1
- Parking: 1450
- Website: centrodelsurmall.com

Centro del Sur Mall is a shopping mall in Ponce, Puerto Rico. At the time of its inauguration in 1962, it was Puerto Rico's largest mall and “the most modern mall in the Caribbean.” It is located at the intersection of Puerto Rico routes PR-163 (Avenida Las Américas) and PR-1 (Bulevar Miguel Pou). Its original building cost was $2,500,000 ($45.5 million in 2025 dollars). It has been enlarged several times; including in 1991, in 2005, and again in 2010; this last time to accommodate the megastore Burlington.

== History ==
=== Opening: 1960s ===
On June 27, 1962, developed by IBEC Realty Company, Centro del Sur inaugurated with anchors Kresge’s, Barker’s, and Grand Union. At the time it consisted of 120,000 square feet of retail space with 18 establishments such as Farmacias Moscoso, Thom McAn, Banco de Ponce, Elegance, Mayfair, and One-Hour Martinizing. The $2,500,000 shopping center which took two years to be built, being in plans since 1960, it was considered at the time the most modern shopping center in the Caribbean. It was constructed by engineer Santiago Castrodad, and featured a 436 foot long shopping corridor with benches, gardens, and a central fountain with colored lighting that served as main attractions at the mall. The shopping corridor was about 40 feet wide and over 21 feet high, with its drastically angled accordion-type roof. Barker’s made its debut on the island with this new store at the shopping center.

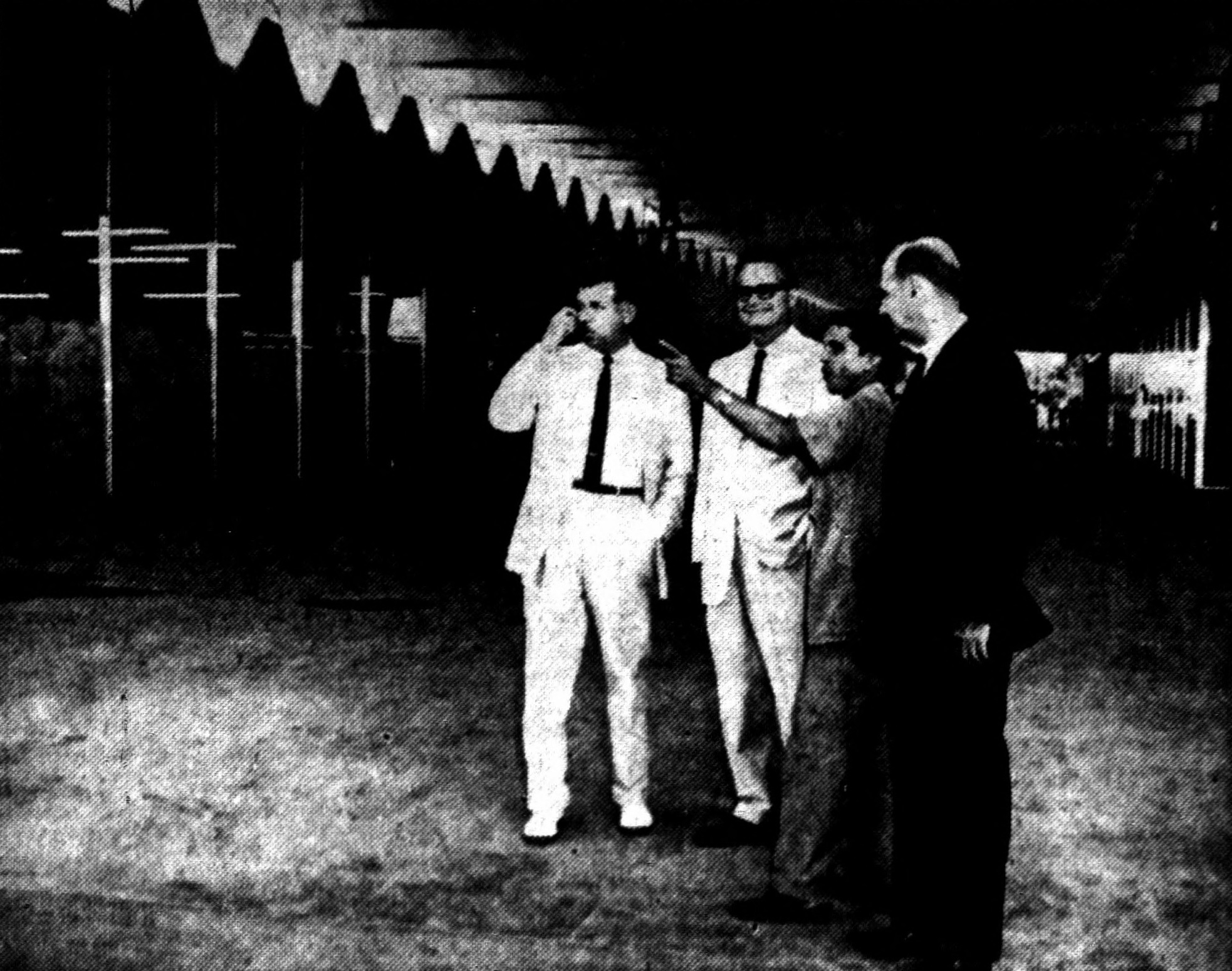
Engineer Santiago Castrodad explains the main details of the new Centro del Sur in 1962.

=== 1980s-1990s ===
In June 1987, the Kresge’s store at the shopping center would close, leaving employees who had worked at the store for over 20 years without jobs.

In 1994, a space previously occupied by New York Department Stores became an extension of the main mall which then accommodated Marshalls, Tiendas Ferco, Me Salvé, Postnet, and six other local tenants. This also triggered a complete reconstruction of the mall's entrance and facade. The combination of the re-tenanting and remodeling the center proved to be very successful as sales figures increased consistently.

In 1995, the Malecón Ave. overpass was completed providing new and better access to the shopping center and approximately 150 additional parking spaces for a total of 1,350 parking spaces.

=== 2000s ===
In 2005, a 20,000 square foot expansion for the Marshalls Megastore was to be completed by July of that year.

In the late 2000s, the mall was anchored by a Marshalls Megastore, Farmacias El Amal, and a Pitusa. Rincón del Sabor the food court at the mall had food options for all tastes, such as Subway, AKA Los Tacos, Mr. Pretzels, Crave, Goodies, Charlie’s Pizza, Country Deli, and Villa China’s chinese exquisite food. Tenants at the time were establishments such as Me Salvé, Almacenes Kress, Marianne, Rave, Madison, Jeans.com, Payless ShoeSource, RadioShack, Foot Locker, La Defensa, Kay-Bee Toys, Rent-A-Center, and Western Auto.

=== 2010s, and on ===
On June 24, 2010, it was reported that a new 69,595 square foot Burlington Coat Factory store would be located in the section of the mall that formerly housed Western Auto, Pitusa, Farmacias El Amal, Madison and Rent-A-Center, with the latter two stores being relocated to another section of the mall. Located in Ponce, the 220,304 square foot Centro del Sur Mall had enjoyed additional exposure and traffic as the result of renewal efforts in the southern city's historic section at the time.

On March 27, 2011, the Burlington Coat Factory store at the mall finally inaugurated.

In October 2012, a Burlington Baby Depot store opened at the mall.

== Notability ==
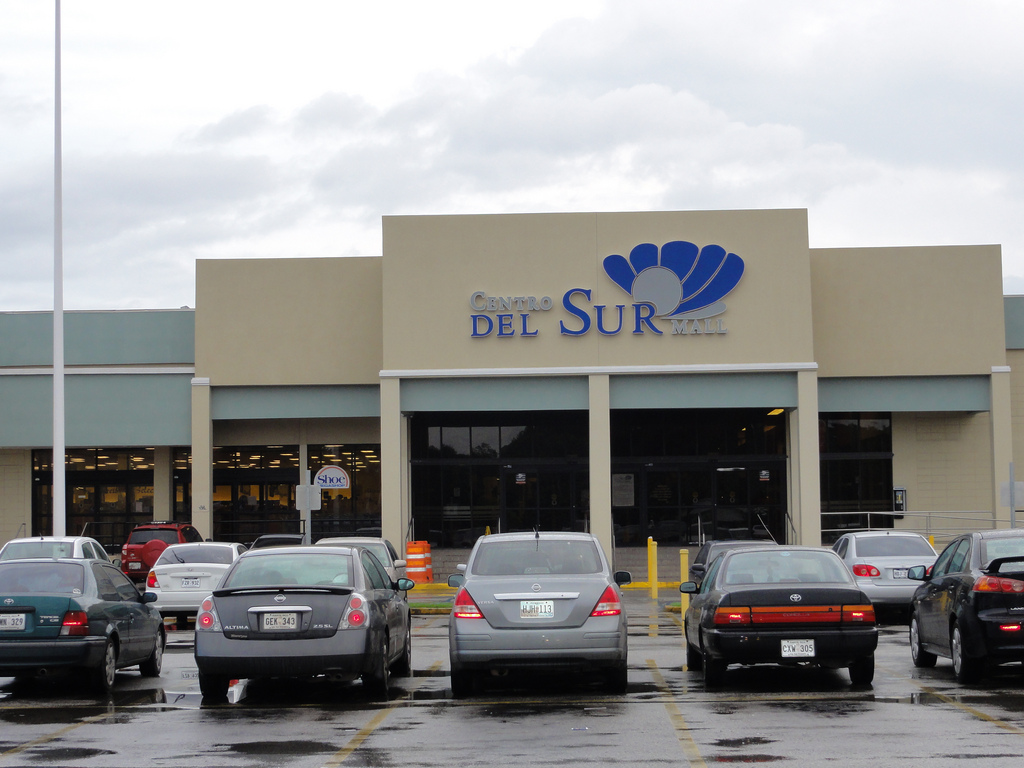
Southern entrance to the mall

Centro del Sur made history as Puerto Rico's largest mall until the 1968 opening of Plaza Las Americas in San Juan. Randall Peffer, of Lonely Planet, calls Centro del Sur "the place where shopping addicts head to when they need 'mall fixes'". During the 300th anniversary of the founding of the city of Ponce, the mall gained prominence for being the mall closest to the Ponce Historic Zone.

== Design ==
A unique characteristic of this mall is its zig-zag prefab reinforced concrete roof which is not found in any other mall in Puerto Rico. The mall's main corridor is oriented in a north-south axis, with a shorter east-west axis and a smaller east-west hallway. Centro del Sur is the first and only mall in Puerto Rico with a truss zig-zag prefab concrete roof system.

== Tenants ==
Centro del Sur has over 50 stores and more than 30 kiosks and food court vendors. An area for community events at the mall is unique among malls in Puerto Rico. The Mall has been southern Puerto Rico's regional outlet for a number of major national departmental chains including Kresge, Barker's, Marshalls and Burlington. The mall is managed by Commercial Centers Management.

== Location ==
The mall is located on the southwestern corner of Miguel Pou Boulevard (PR-1) and Las Americas Avenue (PR-163). The main branch of the Ponce Public Library is within walking distance west of the mall, and Urbanizacion La Alhambra, Puerto Rico's first upper-class suburban development, is located diagonally across from the Mall to the northwest. This puts it just outside the Ponce Historic Zone.

A limited-access highway, PR-12, also known as Avenida Santiago de los Caballeros, and which opened to the public in 1995, was built just west of the mall providing easy access to it. The mall is flanked by several outlying banks, and restaurants which together bring the total effective retail area within the plaza to over 350,000 square feet The mall is also readily accessible via taxi service with the Union Taxi terminal depot located at the mall's main eastern entrance.

== Accolades ==
Centro del Sur Mall was the venue used by Melina León to debut her new album “Corazón de Mujer” Other talent shows have also taken place here. On 24 December 1966, the mall became the first public place in Puerto Rico where Santa Claus landed via a helicopter to hand out gifts to waiting children, a marketing and advertising stunt. Today, the yearly “Miss Centro del Sur” event takes place instead.
