= Señorial Plaza =

Shopping mall located in San Juan, Puerto Rico

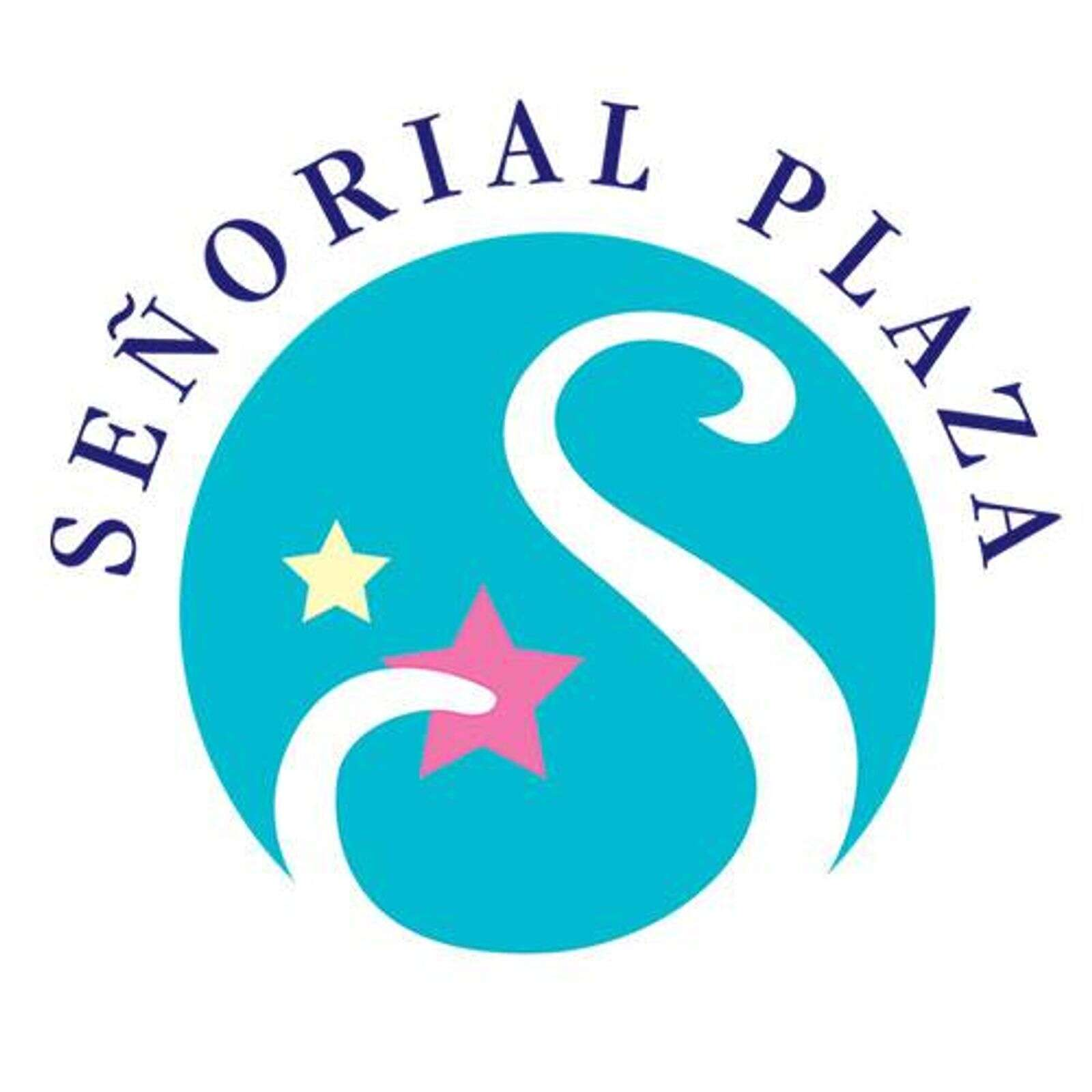
- Location: San Juan, Puerto Rico
- Coordinates: 18°22′13″N 66°4′4″W
- Address: 22 Av. Winston Churchill, San Juan, 00926
- Opened: 1976
- Owner: Ramón Calderón
- Architect: Martorell, Borgos & Associates
- Num. of stores: 20 (approx.)
- Num. of anchor tenants: 3
- Floor area: 202,847 sq ft (18,845.1 m^{2})
- Floors: 1

Señorial Plaza, also known as the El Señorial Plaza, is an enclosed shopping mall in San Juan, Puerto Rico. Anchor stores for the mall are a Ross Dress for Less, Pueblo Supermarket, and a Walgreens. It formerly had a Kmart as an anchor store which closed in August 2015, the space now in part taken up by Ross.

== History ==
=== Opening and success: 1970s-1980s ===
On October 1, 1975, Barkers Discount Department Stores would open a store at the shopping mall.

On December 5, 1975, Farmacias Moscoso would open a pharmacy at the shopping mall.

In 1976, El Señorial Plaza would officially inaugurate that year with anchor stores Barkers, Pueblo Supermarkets, and a Farmacias Moscoso. It would also feature establishments such as Thom McAn, Rahola Photo Supply, Almacenes Rodríguez, Cristina's, Franklins, International Boutique, La Esquina Famosa, La Favorita, Tops & Bottoms, and others. It would be designed by Martorell, Borgos & Associates.

On November 10, 1977, a new 2-screen cinema Teatros El Señorial I and II would inaugurate on the shopping mall premises. The President of Wometco Puerto Rico, Inc., Walter E. Senior, was reported to be very satisfied with the two new movie theaters that his company had opened to the public. He indicated that the two new theaters El Señorial I and II had the most modern advances and the necessary comfort to serve well the growing and progressive community of Cupey, in Río Piedras, and its surroundings, as well as the metropolitan area of San Juan due to its strategic location and good communication routes that facilitated access to the public. Wometco planned to inaugurate the El Señorial I and II theaters in 1975, but the government had carried out an investigation and their construction was canceled. Many months later the owners of the place approached Wometco again offering to reconsider the project because no one had built any theater in that entire progressive area of Río Piedras, and plans would eventually go through. Gerrits Caribbean, Inc. would be in charge of the construction of the two modern theaters El Señorial I and II, in the El Señorial Shopping Center, it was considered the largest shopping center construction company in the entire Caribbean area.

On May 29, 1979, it was reported that The Highway Authority proposed to build access ramps to the Las Américas Highway in the El Señorial area, as part of the work on the structure that was under construction on Lomas Verdes Avenue. This was stated by the executive director of the Highway Authority, Luis E. Landrau, in a letter addressed to the President of the Association of Merchants of El Señorial Mall. Agustín Cruz Bermúdez. Crüz Bermúdez directed a campaign through the commercial center of El Señorial to collect signatures from adjacent urbanizations in petition to the Department of Public Works for the construction of accesses to the Highway to alleviate traffic in said sector. The petition was joined by hundreds of residents of the adjacent urban areas, whose population was estimated at 60,000 people, who signed letters and lists of support through all the stores in the Señorial Mall.

On November 21, 1979, Gitty's Toys would open a store at the shopping mall.

On December 12, 1981, it was reported that in the Christmas spirit El Señorial Plaza, had its main hallway decorated with a tree decorated with garlands that simulated sweets. Several of the stores displayed interesting decorations, such as the local "Detalles", where you could see a beautiful nativity scene with Dresden figures; and the store "Recuerdos" in which could be appreciated a display case featuring a white tree, made of nylon, with delicate decorations of candy, bows, flowers and transparent pastel-colored balls. The El Señorial Plaza at the time had around 40 establishments such as Florsheim, Marianne, Emily Shops, Burger King, Baskin Robbins, and by 1982 the opening of others were expected, indicated the president of the Association, Fernando Hernández. He added that the center served around 12,000 families in the area.

In April 1982, El Señorial Plaza would have establishments such as Thom McAn, Zales, Gitty's Toys, Farmacias Moscoso, Marianne, Carmen Chirino, Emily Shops, Burger King, Baskin Robbins, and a Land of Oz arcade, among many others.

On November 24, 1982, Casa Telas would open a store at the shopping mall.

On May 28, 1983, it was reported that the Kmart Corporation had completed that week the acquisition of five lease contracts for stores previously operated by the Barkers chain on the Island, and hoped to reopen them by September or October of that year, a company executive confirmed. Kmart had paid approximately $2.1 million to obtain the leases for these stores of which included the El Señorial Plaza. The Barkers firm had closed 16 stores it had in Puerto Rico earlier that year due to financial problems of its parent company, KDT Industries. KDT had filed for bankruptcy and began auctioning the leases of the Barkers stores that had closed.

In October 1985, Sbarro would open a pizzeria at the shopping mall.

=== Expanding: 1990s-2000s ===
In 1995, Farmacias El Amal would acquire the Farmacias Moscoso chain, converting the pharmacy at the mall into the Farmacias El Amal nameplate.

In 1995, El Señorial Plaza would be renovated by then owners Manley Berenson, being embellished with neon, mosaic tiled floors, and pastel colors, along with a new logo for the mall.

In 2005, the mall was acquired by DDR Corp. from a $1.15 billion portfolio deal with Caribbean Property Group (CPG) which included the mall among others.

In 2006, El Señorial Plaza would include a new TGI Friday's, replacing part of the former cinema.

On July 26, 2007, El Señorial Plaza, owned and operated by Developers Diversified Realty (DDR), was moving forward with the addition of a $3 million, eight-unit food court area. It would further complement the foot traffic that the property's anchor tenants already generated. El Señorial, while one of the smaller properties of DDR at the time, was a solid performer as it was anchored in the heart of a well-established residential market with great access and surrounded by lots of commercial traffic. The construction of the food court was slated to begin summer 2008, and was expected to generate 80 new jobs.

=== 2010s, and on ===
In 2010, the Señorial Plaza would be anchored by Big Kmart, Walgreens and a free standing Pueblo Supermarket. The tenant mix within the balance of the shopping center included well known national, regional and local tenants including Chatarra Surf Shop, GameStop, GNC, Gordon's Jewelers, Kress/Kress Kids, Marianne, Payless ShoeSource, Perfumania, RadioShack, and Rainbow.

On April 29, 2015, it was reported that the closing process for the Kmart at El Señorial had begun, the establishment would have clearance sales in all departments with discounts of up to 40%. As it was announced on that April 8, the Kmart at El Señorial, would begin its liquidation process in view of the closure of the establishment on August 2, 2015. This closure marked the second closure that Kmart had made in Puerto Rico so far that year. As announced, on May 9, the Vega Baja Kmart store would also close its doors, leaving 200 workers unemployed.

In 2017, DDR Corp. spun off its Puerto Rican shopping centers to RVI (Retail Value Inc.) due to struggles they had after the Hurricane Maria, making RVI the new owner of the mall at the time.

On September 27, 2019, it was reported that at an attempt to revitalize the Señorial Plaza, the shopping center was preparing to open a Kool to Play family entertainment business in the former food court space. The establishment would occupy approximately 15,000 square feet and would generate a dozen direct jobs. It would be the first of three entertainment centers to be built on the island.

On June 4, 2021, it was reported that RVI announced it had closed the sale of the shopping center on June 3, for $20.4 million. The buyer was Ramón Calderón, owner of the Pueblo Supermarkets chain and Holsum of Puerto Rico. RVI said the sale amount was "prior to closing costs, prorations and other closing adjustments". The company used the net proceeds to repay mortgage debt.

On July 17, 2026, it was reported that Ross Dress for Less would be opening its store the following day at the mall on July 18. It serves as the first real anchor store for the mall since Kmart left in August 2015, replacing part of the former space with over 20,000 square feet, having an interior entrance.

== Current Anchors ==
- Ross Dress for Less
- Supermercados Pueblo
- Walgreens
- PetSmart

== Former Anchors ==
- Barker's
- Kmart
- Farmacias Moscoso
- Farmacias El Amal
