= Pitusa =

Former chain of department stores in Puerto Rico

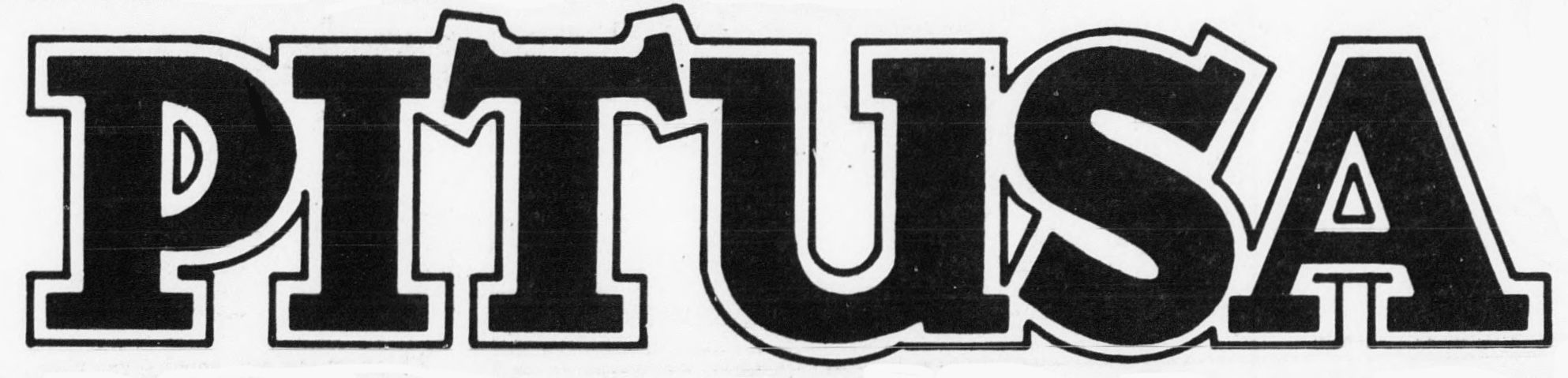
- Logo from the 1980s
- Type: Department store
- Industry: Retail
- Founded: 1976; 50 years ago
- Founder: Israel Kopel
- Defunct: 2019; 7 years ago
- Fate: Bankrupted
- Number of locations: 40+ (at peak)
- Revenue: $265 million (2003)
- Total assets: $56 million (2003)
- Number of employees: 4,000 (2012)

Pitusa (Spanish: Almacenes Pitusa) was one of the largest chains of department stores operating in Puerto Rico and a competitor of another chain on the island, Topeka.

== History ==
=== Origins ===
In 1976, Israel Kopel opened the first Pitusa store, deviating from the existing traditional marketing concept on the Island. Additional branches would be established in areas of high population density and commercial premises with space for abundant parking.

=== Expanding: 1980s-2000s ===
On February 18, 1982, a new discount supermarket store in the chain was inaugurated on Port street in Mayagüez. The chain at the time had stores in Ponce and Carolina and planned to open another discount supermarket in Caguas.

In August 1984, Banco de Ponce granted Almacenes Pitusa a loan over $600,000, partial financing of the "Plaza Pitusa" project that was to be built in Carolina.

On November 15, 1984, the warehouse store concept arrived in Puerto Rico, as Pitusa opened an “Extra Warehouse”, a 46,000 square foot store in Carolina, with parking for more than 400 cars.

On December 6, 1984, a new store in the chain opened in Bayamón at the Bayamón Gardens Shopping Center.

In August 1985, the president of Pitusa, Israel Kopel, commented that operational efficiency had been the key to the success of the company on the Island. With the inauguration of branch number 20 in the Santa María Shopping Center, Pitusa had become one of the largest chains of stores on the island. The chain, which had hundreds of employees and four supermarkets added in the years prior, expected to grow in the next five years. Some specialists had observed a price war during the previous decade, while the large department store chains had not yet fully decided whether to enter into competition on the island.

Other observers noted that consumers had benefited the most from the situation, but the potential long-term implications for these companies, if the escalating price war persisted were not fully appreciated. Pitusa aimed to introduce a "Cash & Carry" concept, offering affordable food options without the luxuries found in similar establishments. As it was believed that the economic outlook for Puerto Rico in the upcoming years would be challenging, increased work efforts and the use of all available administrative resources to enhance operational efficiency within the company became necessary. Pitusa planned to open a branch in Utuado in September and another in Caguas in October of that year. Similarly, the company also planned to establish a store in Aguadilla with 60,000 feet of space before the end of 1985.

On November 25, 1988, a Pitusa Extra Warehouse would open in Ponce at the Centro del Sur Mall. On April 6, 1989, the first Hypermarket in the chain opened in Levittown. On May 4, 1989, a Pitusa Extra Warehouse would open in Caguas, at the Consolidated Mall.

n April 1989, the chain, which had sales of $100 million the year prior, declared its intention to expand by opening stores overseas over the next five years, following the model of its Levittown hypermarket. Israel Kopel, the then chairman, told El Mundo newspaper that some $20 million were expected to be invested in the expansion, adding that they had identified Cupey, Humacao, Aguadilla, Mayaguez, Ponce, Arecibo and Guaynabo as possible areas for the establishment of stores. At the time, the chain included supermarkets and discount stores, and had around 40 stores that employed about 2,000 employees.

On August 28, 2003, Pitusa reportedly opened stores in shopping centers in Río Grande and Yabucoa, that incorporated some or all of the Pitusa Department Store, Supermarket, and National Lumber concepts. All of the new stores were expected to be operational by the 2004 Christmas season, and all would anchor their respective shopping centers. Leon Winer, vice president of Downtown Development Corp., a real-estate development & leasing company, announced that Pitusa Department Store, Supermarket, and National Lumber would open at the Yabucoa Plaza Shopping Center. According to Pitusa, the supermarket would occupy 27,346 square feet, the department store 20,701 square feet, and National Lumber 15,079 square feet. Plaza San Francisco Investment LLC, said Pitusa executives had signed a contract to build a 115,000 square foot store to anchor the Rio Grande Plaza shopping center. Construction was expected to begin in about a month at the time and the store was expected be operational by Christmas 2004. With a 2001 revenue of $246 million, Almacenes Pitusa was Puerto Rico's 17th largest locally owned company, according to the 2003 Caribbean Business "Book of Lists."

On December 18, 2008, it was reported that in regards to consumer loyalty, Pitusa was Puerto Rico's leading discount chain. Enjoying a similar level of repeat business as Walmart at the time, Puerto Rico's own Pitusa was by far the most frequented discount store on the island. Some 43% visited this discount chain more than any other, followed by Capri, which came in second with 28% of the customers. Other discount chains with a small following were Topeka (3%) and La Reina (2%). In direct correlation to the island's deteriorated economic situation, one in every ten residents said they'd shop at other discount stores more regularly than established chains. Shoppers under age 55 were the most likely to shop at discount stores. In fact, nine out of ten under the age of 55 did, compared to 83% of those aged 55 or more, who did.

=== Selling, closure, and bankruptcy ===
In December 2011, Pitusa confirmed it was exiting the supermarket business, selling or closing the 16 stores that made up the island wide discount food chain at this time.

On November 27, 2012, it was announced that, to continue achieving operational efficiencies, the retailer was to consolidate its hardware store business under Metropolitan Lumber & Hardware Inc., a company it founded in 2009. The move would transfer about $21.4 million in assets from National Lumber, including all existing contracts, real estate, land, improvements, equipment, vehicles and inventory related to 12 stores. The move, outlined in a letter, was the latest in a series of decisions that Pitusa had been making to streamline its operations. Published reports had confirmed that Pitusa had been facing challenges for the previous three years, during which it had been actively negotiating with suppliers to alleviate a portion of its growing debt. It was also confirmed that Pitusa had sold its Muebles y Enseres furniture business to Super Buy Furniture, a company owned by the sons of the founders of Mueblerías Berríos, which was Puerto Rico's largest locally owned furniture chain at the time. The transaction involving the transfer of 22 Muebles y Enseres stores was expected to close on December 4. The company refrained from revealing the financial terms of the transaction, citing a confidentiality agreement. Pitusa employed around 4,000 workers in Puerto Rico.

On July 9, 2014, it was reported that Pitusa Muebles y Enseres filed for Chapter 11 bankruptcy with a debt of $26.7 million, according to the Puerto Rico Bulletin. The bankruptcy also affected Super Buy Furniture, which had acquired the 22 furniture stores from Pitusa Muebles y Enseres in November 2012 for an undisclosed value, but was expecting an additional $30 million in sales. The largest creditors were Mueblerías Berríos and Rent Express by Berríos, with debts of $3.9 million and $9.1 million, respectively. The company also owed the Department of the Treasury $564,000. A few branded Pitusa stores would outlast this bankruptcy, but they would all eventually close or be rebranded.
