= Topeka (store) =

Former chain of department stores in Puerto Rico

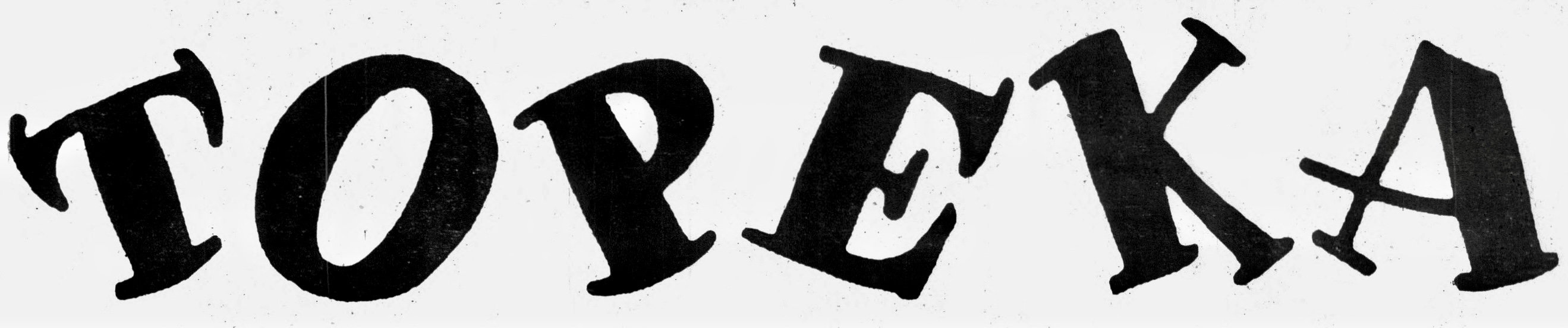
- Logo from the 1980s
- Native name: Tiendas Topeka
- Industry: Retail
- Founded: 1967; 59 years ago
- Founder: Julio Estrella
- Defunct: 2010s
- Headquarters: Santurce, San Juan, Puerto Rico
- Number of locations: 7 (2015)
- Revenue: $34 million (2001)
- Owner: Almacenes Yakima Inc.
- Number of employees: 175+ (2015)

Tiendas Topeka (or Topeka Stores) was a large Puerto Rican department store chain.

== History ==
Like many of his fellow Cubans, Julio Estrella arrived in Puerto Rico in the early '60s. In Cuba he had a successful miscellaneous-wholesale operation, which he decided to start up in Puerto Rico with the help of his brother and his nephew. Following the advice of a friend, who happened to be a successful merchant in New York, Estrella decided to venture into the retail business, opening the first Topeka store on Loiza Street in Santurce in 1967. "We stocked our store with some of the same articles we offered through our wholesale business and with some articles from other suppliers," recalled Estrella. “We also got a break from our friend in New York, who gave us a generous line of credit to begin our operation.” The store's offerings were revamped after Estrella's nephew noticed that Santurce needed a place where area residents could purchase articles for the home at affordable prices. Topeka's shift in inventory caused sales to double within a year, said Estrella. When the operation was generating enough sales to allow investing in advertising, Estrella placed ads in the newspaper and on the radio, which helped push sales even further. Two years later, the first Topeka store in Puerto Rico reported sales of $2 million. After the success of the Loiza Street store, the Estrellas expanded their operation, opening new stores in Hato Rey, Río Piedras, Caguas, Carolina, and Arecibo. As for the Topeka name, its origins became somewhat cloudy with time. Estrella once said it was the name of a nightclub he frequented in his native Cuba. Another possible origin is rooted in frugality. The first Topeka store opened in a location where a store called Kimbo used to be. To take advantage of the existing "K" on the store sign, the name Topeka was chosen. The better known Topeka, Kan., had a role in the company's development, as Estrella named another of his business ventures after the neighboring town of Yakima. Topeka would go on to compete with local store chains on the island over the years such as La Reina, Pitusa, and Tiendas Capri.

On June 30, 1988, a new Topeka store would open at the Carolina Shopping Court in Carolina as an anchor to the mall.

In 1998, Hurricane Georges would destroy the Arecibo store, and Estrella owner of Topeka Inc. decided it wouldn't be cost effective to refurbish and reopen it.

On March 27, 2003, it was reported that time seemed to have stood still at Topeka Inc. The same principles upheld by the Estrella brothers when they founded the discount retail chain almost 40 years ago at the time remained the driving force behind what was a $34 million operation (based on 2001 revenue), putting it at No. 144 on the 2003 Caribbean Business list of the Top 300 locally owned companies.

On January 30, 2015, Topeka would be kicking off the new year with a long-term strategic succession and expansion plan that called for a $4 million investment, the addition of three new stores, and the creation of 53 new permanent jobs, Rolando López, president of Almacenes Yakima Inc., parent company of Topeka announced. Once completed in 2016, all stores would feature a new retail image. Construction of the first new store and remodeling works of existing locations were scheduled to begin March 2015, at which time the chain will also unveil the chain’s new image. Topeka was among the island’s top 10 discount retail chains with estimated annual retail sales totaling more than $20 million. As part of the succession plan, the López family would acquire the totality of the parent company including the warehouse operation, which would also be prepared to accommodate the chain’s projected growth. Overall, construction plans called for the development of three new stores, bringing Topeka’s total number of locations up to seven once the expansion was completed in 2016. Existing stores in Río Piedras, San Juan, Bayamón and Caguas would continue to serve the thriving downtown centers they operated in, however, they would be remodeled to match the chain’s new image. Expansion efforts would translate into 53 new permanent jobs within the chain’s retail operation, bringing total head count at the time up to more than 175. Another 36 indirect jobs were expected to be created during construction. Citing strategic reasons, the Topeka store on Loiza Street, in Santurce would be closed. However, the store’s approximate 11 employees would be considered for employment within the remaining Topeka stores as well as the new locations once operational. To successfully break into the competitive shopping center arena, Topeka’s new store prototype featured the latest retail industry store-within-store design concept, providing greater retail floor space for new product categories, brand names and designer labels. To that end, Topeka would strengthen relationships with longstanding suppliers. The expansion would be supported by an integrated marketing strategy, including more comprehensive shoppers, targeted promotions and public relations initiatives.
