= Kimberly Casiano =

Puerto Rican businesswoman

- Born: December 21, 1957 (age 68); New York City
- Occupations: Former president and chief operating officer of Casiano Communications

Kimberly Casiano (born December 21, 1957) is a Puerto Rican businesswoman. She is the former president and chief operating officer of Casiano Communications — the largest Hispanic publisher of periodicals and magazines in the United States.

Casiano in 2007 also served on the board of directors of Ford Motor Company, Mutual of America and Mead Johnson Nutrition Company.

== Early life and education ==
Kimberly Casiano was born in New York City to Puerto Rican parents – Manuel Casiano, chairman of the board of Casiano Communications and Nora Casiano, the family firm's then business manager. At age 12, she moved with her family to Puerto Rico when her father joined Governor Luis A. Ferré's cabinet as economic development administrator.

In 1979, Casiano graduated magna cum laude from Princeton University with a degree in politics and Latin American studies. She later earned a Master's degree in Business Administration from Harvard Business School in 1981, at which time she became the youngest woman to receive an MBA from Harvard at the time.

== Business career ==
Casiano began her business career in 1981, when she founded Caribbean Marketing Overseas Corporation, a consulting firm specializing in financing, trade and investment promotion between the United States, the Caribbean and Central America. The firm worked closely with the Agency for International Development (A.I.D.) on Caribbean Basin Initiative projects.

In 1988, she joined the publishing and marketing business Casiano Communications. She held a number of management positions in the company until 1994, when she became president of the company.

In December 2003, she was elected to the board of directors of Ford Motor Company, becoming the first Hispanic woman to serve on the board of any top five Fortune 100 corporate boards. At Ford, she joined three Ford committees — Audit; Nominating and Corporate Governance; and Sustainibility and Innovation.

In April 2006, she joined the board of directors of Mutual of America, which provides insurance coverage and retirement plans to non-profits as well as small- to medium-sized firms.

In March 2010, Casiano joined the board of directors of Mead Johnson Nutrition Company, a manufacturer of infant formula.

== Service to the community ==
Casiano has been on the board of directors of the Hispanic Scholarship Fund (HSF), a non-profit which awards almost $50 million annually in scholarships to Hispanic college students throughout the U.S. She is also a founding board member of the Latino Corporate Directors Association (LCDA).

She is former Puerto Rico Chapter Chair of the Young Presidents' Organization, Puerto Rico chapter. She co-founded and is vice chair of Nuestra Casa de los Niños, a nonprofit group providing private school education for economically disadvantaged children in Puerto Rico.

Casiano has been a member of the board of advisors of Moffitt Cancer Center in Tampa, Florida.

For years, she has been committed to honoring the memory of José Berrocal, a former classmate of hers and William Ford at Princeton University who died after having served as the youngest president of the Puerto Rico Government Development Bank, as a role model for young Puerto Ricans. For a decade, she led the fundraising efforts of the American Cancer Society in Puerto Rico, establishing the Red Gala annual event and the Jose M. Berrocal Scholarship program for college-bound students who are cancer survivors.

== Personal ==
Casiano is married to Peruvian-born Juan F. Woodroffe and they have two children.

== See also ==
- List of Puerto Ricans
