= Farmacias Moscoso =

Defunct pharmacy chain in Puerto Rico

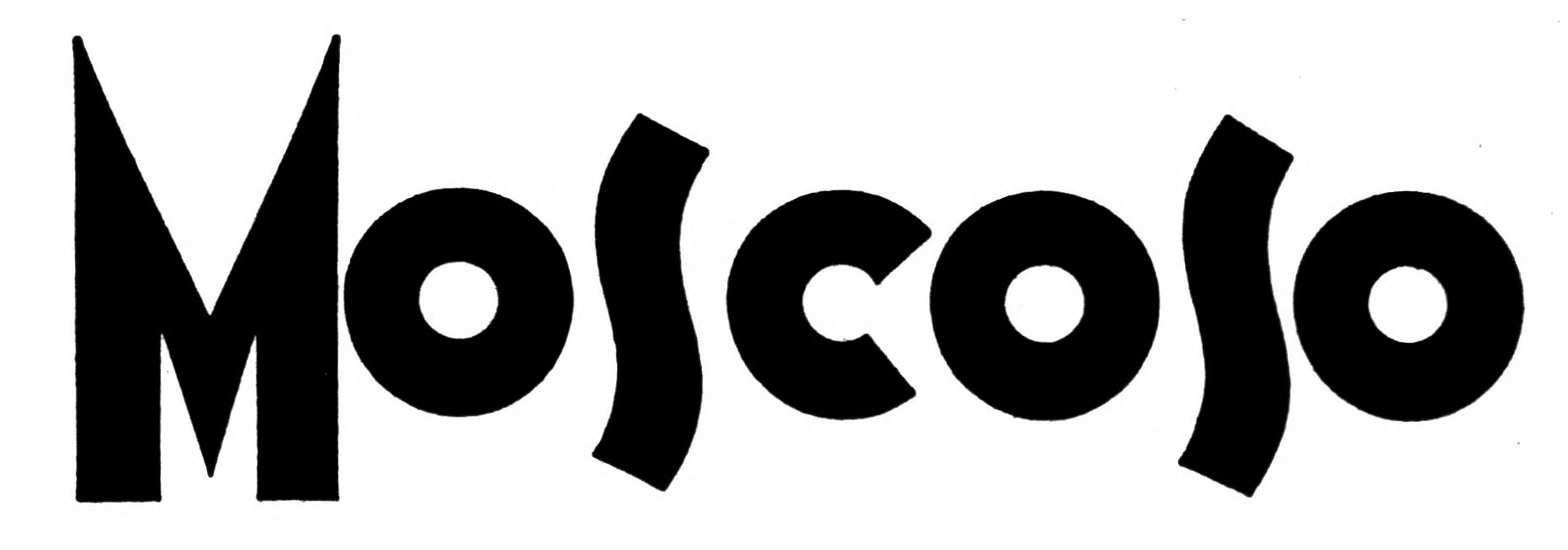
- Logo used from 1962 to 1979

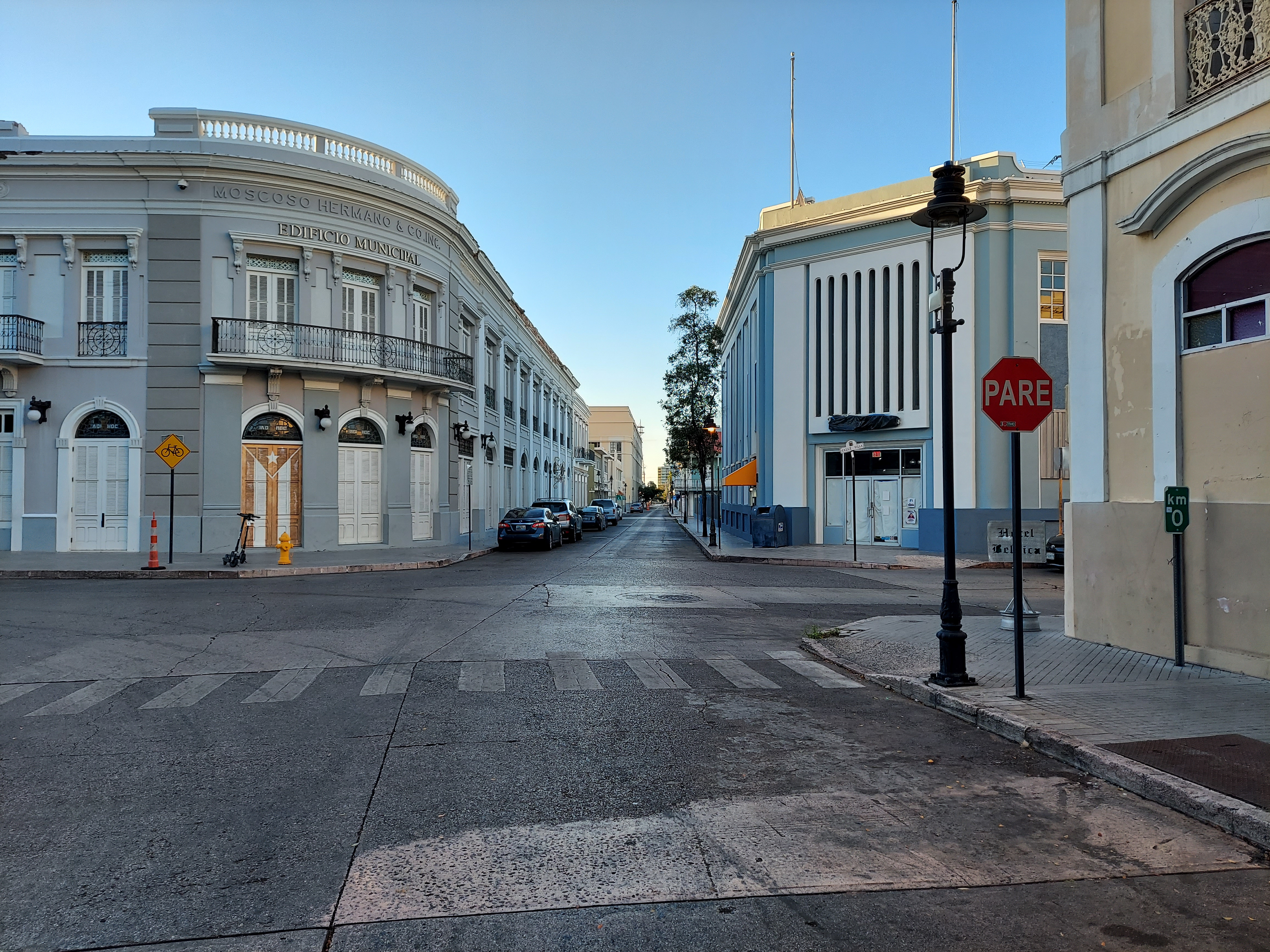
- On the left, the former headquarters of Farmacias Moscoso, at the southeast corner of Calle Villa and Calle Concordia, in Ponce, Puerto Rico, now (2022) part of the Ponce Municipal Government office complex
- Founded: 1898; 128 years ago
- Founder: Teodoro Moscoso
- Defunct: 1995; 31 years ago
- Fate: Acquired by Farmacias El Amal
- Successor: Farmacias El Amal
- Headquarters: Ponce, Puerto Rico
- Number of locations: 31 (1983)
- Revenue: $60 million (approx.) (1983)
- Number of employees: 650 (approx.) (1983)

Farmacias Moscoso, commonly known as Moscoso, was a Puerto Rican pharmacy chain that evolved into a large company from its creation in Ponce, Puerto Rico during 1898. It was first known as Droguerías Moscoso.

== History ==
=== Origins ===
The first Moscoso pharmacy opened in 1898 in the town of Aibonito by Don Teodoro Moscoso, father of late president, Don José G. Moscoso. Don Teodoro was Puerto Rican, born in Carolina and came from a large family made up of six brothers and six sisters. His father owned what they called in the United States a "general store" in the town of Carolina. This is a type of store that existed in small towns in Puerto Rico and in the United States. It was called that because it sold everything, from postage stamps, candy, soft drinks, fabrics, etc., and they even had somewhere in the store home remedies, pills for different ailments, purgatives, etc. It is interesting to note that of the six men in the Moscoso family, five became pharmacists. When Don Teodoro finished his studies (which at that time were taken at a pharmacy institute, at the same time that he practiced for several years in a pharmacy establishment under the supervision of the owner, who was also a pharmacist) he decided to establish his own business. He was informed of a pharmacy that was for sale in Aibonito for which they were asking $4,000. Although this may seem like an anecdote, in those very days Puerto Rico was hit by a storm and Don Teodoro bought the rubble of the pharmacy for $300. He put all his effort into rebuilding the small building and we had here the first Farmacias Moscoso, a very primitive wooden building, in those times when in Puerto Rico children and even adults walking barefoot through the streets were still a common sight. It was precisely in the days of the change in the governorship of Puerto Rico, since the island became a possession of the United States and there were great changes to come. The four brothers Moscoso who, in addition to Don Teodoro, chose the profession of pharmacy, practiced at some time under the supervision of Don Teodoro. Don Teodoro met Alejandrina Mora, a young lady from Ponce, in Aibonito, with whom he married. From this marriage there were two boys and one girl. Naturally, since his wife was from Ponce and Don Teodoro was a very enterprising man, he moved his business to Ponce where he established himself in a small store on Isabel Street. As the years went by, the business prospered and in 1916 the business moved to the building that the Pharmacy occupied later on. Moscoso, in front of Plaza Degetau in that city. Teodoro formed a partnership with his brother, Don Ismael, and together they established a wholesale medicine business, in addition to the pharmacy business. Don Teodoro was a man of great vision and even at that time he had ideas of expanding his business. On one occasion the family had two pharmacies in Yauco and three in Ponce. The business had its ups and downs, and during the period of 1925–1935, there was no growth, since the great depression of 1929 affected the economy of Puerto Rico in such a serious way that hundreds of businesses went under bankruptcy. The Moscoso Drugstore, which is what the business was called then, also had a difficult time, but thanks to the conservative ways and high reputation of Don Teodoro Moscoso Sr., it was able to survive this tremendous economic crisis. In the next five years, Don Teodoro's health began to decline, which forced him to retire. José had full knowledge and preparation to manage both businesses. He assumed the management of Moscoso Hno. & Co. and Farmacias Moscoso, Inc., in 1944. By then a favorable change had occurred in the economy of Puerto Rico. The famous industrialization program had begun, precisely directed by Mr. Teodoro Moscoso Jr., and the prospects for future developments in all phases of commerce were good.

=== Expanding: 1950s-1980s ===
In 1954, the first shopping center in Puerto Rico was established in Hato Rey, which was known as the Metropolitan Shopping Center, and space was rented there for a Farmacias Moscoso, the first to be established outside of Ponce. The Puerto Rican public was not accustomed to that type of commercial complex and it took several years for it to be truly welcomed. As the economy grew, several groups of shopping center developers were organized and construction of this type of commercial complex began in the metropolitan area, Ponce, Mayagüez and Caguas.

In 1961, a Farmacias Moscoso was opened in the Ponce Shopping Center in Ponce. In 1963, three Moscoso pharmacies were opened, one in Mayagüez, another in the Caparra Shopping Center and another in the Villa Blanca Shopping Center in Caguas. Expansion continued in 1965, with a pharmacy in the Country Club Shopping Center in Carolina and another pharmacy in the Santa Rosa Shopping Center in Bayamón, which was acquired through purchase from an American firm, Liggett Drugs. Then followed by the opening of two more pharmacies in 1968: the first of which in Ponce, in the Centro del Sur Shopping Center, and another in Santurce, in the Norte Shopping Center. These expansions were very rapid and the business had to wait three more years to recover from these investments. The next Farmacias Moscoso was opened in the Victory Shopping Center in Bayamón, also in 1968.

In 1970, then president, Mr. José Moscoso, died suddenly on September 26 of that year, only 4 months after having opened another pharmacy in Ponce in the La Rambla Shopping Center. This made it a disastrous year for the company. Fortunately, Don José knew how to gather a group of dedicated and aggressive executives who, together with his widow and two oldest children, determined to continue with the business. At the date of Don José's death, the Cayey Shopping Center was already under construction and a contract had been signed to establish a Moscoso Pharmacy there. This pharmacy was inaugurated in March 1971. There were no longer three or four pharmacies. It was already a relatively large company. The wholesale medicine business, Moscoso Hno. & Co., Inc., had acquired another drug store in the metropolitan area, under the name Drug Center, Inc., owned by Mr. Alberto Pelegrina. This transaction had taken place in 1964. With a drugstore that could serve the northern area of the island, they were acquiring clients for new wholesale and also facilities to serve the Farmacias Moscoso in the northern area, which otherwise would have had to be supplied from Moscoso Hno. & Co., Inc. in Ponce.

When developing new shopping centers in different parts of the island, Moscoso always thought of (before any other firm on the continent or in the country) as a "symbol of trust since 1898", which was precisely the phrases we they used in their logo. The next Pharmacy to open was in the new Arecibo Shopping Center in December 1971. In the month of February 1972, Farmacias Moscoso acquired the Massari pharmacy on Villa Street in the city of Ponce from Mr. Héctor Massari. When this transaction was carried out, they closed the doors to the public of a very small Moscoso Pharmacy that operated precisely in front of the Massari Pharmacy, this new Moscoso Pharmacy absorbing the other's clientele. Not only did they open new pharmacies, but they did not forget the oldest one, (No. 1, in front of Plaza Degetau), and it was completely transformed and reopened in April 1972. In June of the same year the El Rey Pharmacy in front of Plaza de Cataño was acquired from Mr. Luis Ferrer. Then the next opening was in Humacao with a super modern pharmacy, this time not in a shopping center, but in the heart of the city, in front of the main square. They wanted to offer services and purchasing facilities to that important group that did not have a car, and also to the public that came from neighboring towns to make their purchases in the city.

Farmacias Moscoso would continue expanding in the 1970s, with openings such as: In November 1973, the 21st pharmacy in the chain opening in the town of Fajardo. In December 1975, the 23rd pharmacy, one of the most successful pharmacies in the chain at the time opening in El Señorial, in Río Piedras. In February 1976, the 24th pharmacy opening in El Cantón, Bayamón. In April 1977, the 25th pharmacy opening in Guayama. In November 1977, the 26th pharmacy opening on Gautier Benítez Street in Caguas. In April 1978, the 27th pharmacy in the chain opening in Río Piedras. And by April 1979, a new and modern pharmacy in Trujillo Alto would be opening, which would be the 28th pharmacy in the chain.

On January 20, 1982, the Farmacias Moscoso Pharmacy chain inaugurated its 29th pharmacy on the Island, located in the Los Jardines shopping center, in Guaynabo. The establishment, with 7,200 square feet of sales space, represented an investment of approximately $300,000, and initially employed 16 people, according to the vice president of the Moscoso chain, Francisco Hernández. Los Jardines was a new shopping center developed by the company Commercial Properties, in which the Grand Union, Western Auto, and Time Out stores had recently opened their doors, in addition to the multiplex movie theaters, Guaynabo Cinemas. There were several stores set to open in the coming months. Farmacias Moscoso, a chain chaired at the time by businessman José Guillermo Moscoso, had 2 pharmacies, located in Ponce, Mayagüez, Arecibo, Carolina, Cayey, Fajardo, Humacao, Trujillo Alto, San Juan and the metropolitan area, Guayama, Caguas, Bayamón and Cataño. Edwin Delgado was general manager of the new Los Jardines pharmacy, where Ana Vega de Angleró was the managing pharmacist.

On April 8, 1983, it was reported that the Moscoso Pharmacy chain had acquired, for an undisclosed sum, four stores in Virgin Islands, thus making its first foray into that branch of business outside of Puerto Rico. The purchased units, which were property of the West Indies firm Corporation, operated under the name Drug Fair and were located one in Long Bay and another in the Four Winds Plaza, St. Thomas, and the other two in the Golden Rock and Villa La Reine shopping centers, in St. Croix. According to information offered in a press release by the president of the chain Moscoso, José Guillermo Moscoso, the acquisition of these pharmacies was expected to increase the firm's current total sales by 10 percent, which is now about $60 million annually. The local company had already assumed the operation of the stores, which now used the nameplate "Moscoso Rx", according to the network's vice president. At the same time, the units were being remodeled and would be officially reopened on April 20 of that year. It was reported that measures that the Moscoso chain had taken in recent years in terms of centralizing purchases and the volume of business it generated allowed the firm to enter new markets using internally generated funds. With these four stores, Moscoso now had 31 branches in total. The chain, whose first store was established by former Public Works administrator Teodoro Moscoso, employed about 650 people in its businesses at the time.

On March 21, 1984, a new pharmacy would open at the Santa Rosa Shopping Center in Bayamón.

=== Acquisition, and dissolution ===
In 1995, Farmacias El Amal another local chain on the island and competitor of Farmacias Moscoso would acquire the chain that year, eventually converting all Farmacias Moscoso locations into the Farmacias El Amal nameplate.

== Aibonito location ==
The Aibonito Moscoso former location is considered a local historical landmark and hosts a museum dedicated to the pharmaceutical retail chain.

== Collectible items ==
Some Farmacias Moscoso advertising materials are considered valuable collector's items, such as postcards, hand fans, etc.

== Other pharmacies ==
Moscoso Pharmacies is not related to other pharmacies similarly named, namely one in The Bronx, New York, U.S.A., one in Venado Tuerto, Argentina and one in Puebla, Puebla, Mexico, the Mexican one which is named Distribuidora Moscoso.
