= Farmacias El Amal =

Former pharmacy chain in Puerto Rico

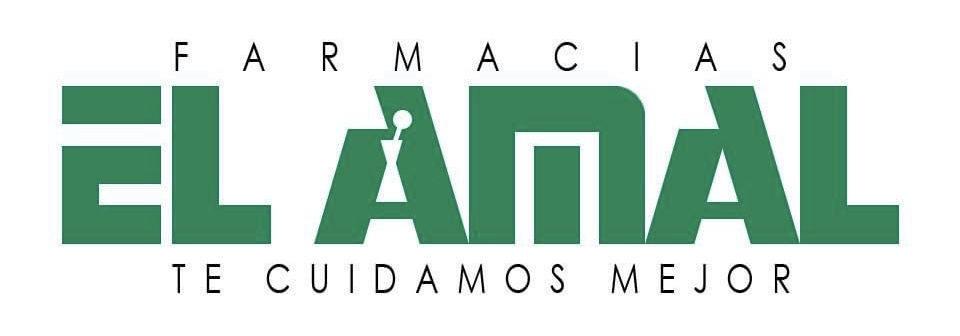
- Type: Privately Held
- Founded: 1973
- Founder: Saleh Yassin
- Defunct: 2011; 15 years ago
- Fate: Bankrupted
- Successor: Walgreens
- Headquarters: San Juan, Puerto Rico
- Number of locations: 61 (at peak) (2008)
- Key people: Saleh Yassin, President and CEO; Muhammed Yassin, Vice President
- Products: Retail, pharmacy, photo
- Revenue: $220 million (approx.) (2007)
- Total assets: $90 million (2002)
- Number of employees: 1,300+ (2007)

Farmacias El Amal, was a regional pharmacy chain operating throughout Puerto Rico. At its peak, it operated more than 60 pharmacies across Puerto Rico. The chain was privately held and was founded in 1973. Its largest competitors were Walgreens, Kmart and Walmart.

== History ==
=== Origins ===
Saleh Yassin came to Puerto Rico from Jerusalem at age 17 to attend Inter American University. He worked his way through college as a self-employed door-to-door salesman. He graduated with honors with a bachelor's degree in economics and business administration. He obtained a master's degree in economics and finance from the University of Rhode Island in 1970, and then studied toward a doctorate in economics and industrial organization at Vanderbilt University. In 1973, he took over Super Farmacia El Amal Inc., a small drugstore in Río Piedras that had less than $200,000 in annual sales and was nearly bankrupt. Decades later, annual sales at Farmacias El Amal surpassed $200 million. Yassin, who was a three time Caribbean Business Top 10 Business Leader, said Puerto Rico is his adopted home and stresses that El Amal was a 100% Puerto Rican company. In 1978, he founded a wholesale operation named COD Drugs, which in 1995 became the purchasing arm of Farmacias El Amal. Yassin had also acquired pharmaceutical manufacturer Sein Mendez Laboratories and entered into various successful real estate ventures. Farmacias El Amal would continue to successfully slowly expand during the 70s and 80s, with new store openings such as in Carolina and San Juan.

On December 8, 1978, Farmacias El Amal would open a store at the Plaza del Carmen Mall in Caguas.

=== Expanding: 1990s–2000s ===
In 1995, Farmacias El Amal would purchase another local drugstore chain on the island, Farmacias Moscoso.

On April 26, 1999, it was reported that 1998 had marked many challenges and changes for the then 50 unit Farmacias El Amal, but, as the year came to a close, Puerto Rico's largest drug store chain posted double digit increases for the year. Sales performance, which was right on target, got some help from promotional and public relations efforts related to 1998 being Farmacias El Amal's 25th anniversary. The promotions included outdoor concerts and commercials. "We're still the new kid on the block in terms of recognition in many areas," said Saleh Yassin, Farmacias El Amal's president and chief executive. “Until three years ago we were a small chain, then we took over the largest chain, but our challenge is that we retained the name of the smaller chain." Despite Farmacias El Amal digesting the Moscoso drug store business it acquired, stiff competition abounded on the small island. Walgreens had 46 locations, Kmart had 26, Wal-Mart had nine, and there were still 850 independent drug stores. Yassin compared the competition to a battleground. In addition to competition, Farmacias had Hurricane Mitch to weather. The chain lost to the hurricane one store which it had since rebuilt and stores operated on emergency power and lights for 40 days. But the hurricane didn't affect overall annual sales, which rose 29 percent to $160 million from 1997. Also contributing to sales was the addition of three new units during the last half of 1998, bringing the chain's total store count to 50. Average store size had been boosted up to 7,500 square feet in 1998 from 6,800 square feet in 1997, as Farmacias remodeled four stores to the chain's new 12,000 square foot prototype. Yassin's first focus for 1999 was getting seven new stores up and operating before the end of the year. Five of the new stores would be 12,000 square feet, one will run 14,000 square feet and one will be nearly 16,000 square feet. Roughly $64 million, or 40 percent of the chain's sales, were pharmacy sales, 65 percent of which were third party. Yassin predicted that number to reach 80 percent by the end of 1999.

On April 24, 2000, it was reported that despite Puerto Rico's difficult competitive climate, Farmacias El Amal ended 1999 with a 12.5 percent sales gain and a 10 percent advance in same store sales. The chain also added five new stores and remodeled five more. The increase in sales to $180 million was far more difficult in 1999 than in previous years because of competitors such as Kmart, which aggressively added drug store style departments in 16 existing units. Farmacias spent $2 million in 1999 to install a new data mining and data warehousing system designed to improve category management. Also in 1999, general merchandise and grocery products accounted for 25 percent of sales, up from the previous year. In addition, over the counter products accounted for 15 percent of sales, health and beauty care products for 10 percent and home health care for 10 percent. In 2000, some of these categories would receive new planograms based on scan sales data from the prior year. Other changes in 2000 included the addition of four drive throughs, which Yassin noted was spurred by Walgreens' aggressive addition of drive throughs to its stores. Farmacias planned to open five stores this year, and all but one were slated to get drive throughs.

On August 31, 2000, it was reported that Farmacias El Amal was forging ahead with its aggressive expansion plans, as it planned to invest about $13 million to open new sites during the next couple of years. "We have contracts signed for 13 new drugstore locations, but opening dates sometimes depend on the completion of shopping centers," Saleh Yassin president and CEO of El Amal announced. El Amal locations to open before year's end included Rio Grande, Las Piedras, Fajardo, and Carolina. "Next year, we are looking to open four to five more," he continued, adding that each new store required an investment of about $1 million. Meanwhile, similar to other local retailers, Yassin commented sales had been slower compared to 1999. "There are many factors affecting sales including high electricity and gasoline prices and the lack of Hurricane Georges' money injection," he said. As far as rumors concerning the sale of El Amal to Eckerd, which reportedly intended to enter the Puerto Rico market, "The rumor denied itself. I always said it wasn't true," he said. "Our plans are to continue opening stores." Eckerd, a wholly owned subsidiary of JCPenney, halted its plans to enter the local market earlier in the year. JCPenney announced plans to close some 45 department stores and 300 Eckerd drugstores nationwide as part of the company's restructuring initiatives.

On April 23, 2001, it was reported that in the words of Farmacias El Amal president and chief executive Saleh Yassin, Puerto Rico had become a "battleground" as competitors such as Walgreens, Kmart and Wal-Mart continuing to open pharmacies there. Despite Puerto Rico's highly competitive marketplace, Farmacias El Amal ended 2000 with an 8 percent sales increase and one store addition. For 2001, the chain has even bigger plans to set it apart from the competition. This year, the drug chain planned to open four more stores, bringing the total number of locations to 59 by years end. And because convenience is high, if not No. 1, on consumers' wish lists, Yassin said three of the new stores would be free standing units with drive through pharmacies. “Our new sites are 90 percent freestanding with drive throughs," said Yassin. "We have to be up to speed with what goes on in the market." Yassin said Farmacias also would add one hour photo labs in all stores to help increase traffic. In addition, the chain would install automatic teller machines, which would allow consumers to pay utility bills electronically or access the internet. And, after putting its e-commerce initiatives on hold, the drug chain is forged ahead and planned that month to launch its e-commerce Web site. The site would offer about 10,000 SKUs and online prescription refills. While the site would be available only in Spanish during the first few months, Yassin said an English version should be initiated by June of that year. The site would also offer second day delivery on goods, or consumers could opt to pick up ordered items at the stores. To further differentiate itself, Farmacias was launching a $300,000 marketing campaign, with the slogan, "Lo nuestro es farmacias," or "Pharmacy is our stuff, said Yassin, who noted that pharmacy accounted for 44 percent of sales.

On March 6, 2003, Farmacias El Amal President & CEO Saleh Yassin announced that the company would invest more than $8 million to open six new stores before Mother's Day. The locally owned pharmacy chain was also celebrating its 30th anniversary at the time. "We already have the Certificates of Need & Convenience [CNC] required by the Health Department to open the pharmacies and have secured the locations," said Yassin. "All we are waiting for now are the use permits from the Regulations & Permits Administration [ARPE by its Spanish acronym]." The new stores would be in Bayamón, Caguas, Encantada (Trujillo Alto), Guayama, Plaza Las Américas, and Prime Retail in Barceloneta. Yassin also noted that four of the six new stores would be in freestanding locations, which he said "usually cost more than $2 million to open. This time the only stores that won't be freestanding are those in Encantada and Plaza Las Américas." Although the chain continued to expand, Yassin said he doesn't think its comparable store sales will increase much. "I really don't see the economy improving, when you match inflation with the increase in sales, you notice that we remain the same as last year," he said.

On June 5, 2003, it was reported that El Amal had proven a fierce competitor to Walgreens, the pharmacy chain with the highest sales in the nation, according to Hoover's Online. Walgreens might’ve been the largest pharmacy chain on the island, but El Amal was a close second; and would open its 61st store that week. With an estimated 2001 revenue of $190 million, El Amal was the 26th-largest locally owned company and the largest locally owned pharmacy chain in Caribbean Business' list of Top 300 locally owned companies. "In 2002 we surpassed $200 million in sales revenue," said Saleh Yassin, president & CEO of Farmacias El Amal. "You can't be scared of competition; you just have to compete. I have seen many local retailers instantly give up all hope when a large competitor enters the local market. If you give up so easily, then there is no hope, but if you strive to do well, you will give yourself the opportunity to survive and excel?" El Amal had approximately 1,050 employees and 55 stores in 2001. Before the end of this week, the chain would grow to 1,500 employees and 61 stores.

On August 14, 2003, after inaugurating five stores in June of that year, Farmacias El Amal was opening another store in San Patricio. The company said the new store in the former Telefónica building required an investment of more than $7 million. It would have a drive-thru window and a parking lot with space for 165 vehicles. El Amal now owned the entire building, but the pharmacy will occupy only the third floor; the other space would be leased. Farmacias El Amal at the time was Puerto Rico's largest locally owned pharmacy chain, according to the 2003 Caribbean Business "Book of Lists."

On March 23, 2006, it was reported that locally owned pharmacy chain El Amal planned to open three more pharmacies by the end of 2007's first quarter, said President Saleh Yassin, adding the investment should reach $4.5 million. Yassin expected El Amal pharmacies to open in Manatí, Morovis and Adjuntas, all averaging 13,000 square feet in size. The Manatí store was expected to open by the end of that year. The Morovis and Adjuntas stores were expected to be ready during the first quarter of 2007. "These are all locations we have leased, not bought, so the investment is for remodeling the space and to purchase equipment and inventory," the executive explained. Some 90 new jobs were to be created when these stores open.

On December 6, 2007, it was reported that the Massachusetts-based CVS drugstore chain's negotiations to acquire local chain El Amal had advanced to the next, and possibly final stage. It was said CVS was already working with local development, architectural and engineering firms to help in the conversion of the stores once the transaction is finalized, a source close to CVS' real estate department confirmed at the time. The source, who declined to be identified at this time, indicated that the company was in the midst of transferring and securing the necessary permits to operate the stores on the island. "This, as everyone who knows Puerto Rico's slow and rather cumbersome permit process, could take some time delaying the arrival and eventual conversion of El Amal stores to CVS to after February 2008," noted the source. CVS/pharmacy was the nation's largest retail pharmacy chain, with approximately 6,200 stores across 38 states. It was unclear, however, whether El Amal, which for more than 30 years had served local communities around the island, would sell the entire chain to CVS or simply spin off some of its non performing locations. El Amal was one of Puerto Rico's leading family-owned companies with more than 60 stores, estimated annual sales of $220 million and 1,150 employees.

On December 13, 2007, Farmacias El Amal vehemently denied the sale of the local pharmacy chain to CVS Caremark. "It's completely false," were the remarks of an annoyed Saleh Yassin, president of El Amal pharmacies, regarding company sale rumors to the drugstore chain. Beyond the categorical denial of El Amal about what he deemed "totally unfounded rumors," Yassin who was known for his long time commitment to Puerto Rico expressed concerned for the uncertainty that such unfounded rumors could create among El Amal's workforce and business partners. Caribbean Business had interviewed unnamed sources close to CVS' real estate and engineering staff who indicated negotiations to acquire El Amal were moving forward, and printed them believing it was so. According to El Amal's Yassin, there is no such deal going on and these rumors represented a malicious attempt to harm the local chain. Instead, local drugstore chain El Amal, which for more than 30 years has serviced local communities around the island, planned to continue expanding its local operations which included more than 60 locations, estimated annual sales of more than $220 million and more than 1,300 employees.

=== Acquisition, bankruptcy, and closure ===
On January 16, 2008, Walgreens announced that it would acquire 20 drugstores in Puerto Rico from Farmacias El Amal, a then still family-owned chain of 61 drugstores based on the island. El Amal would continue operating its other 41 stores in Puerto Rico. The acquisition was expected to close in the first quarter of calendar 2008. Once the agreement was finalized, work would begin on converting the El Amal stores to Walgreens, including remodeling and changing the store names.

On July 17, 2008, it was reported that starting that week. 10-plus stores of former El Amal drugstore locations would officially begin operations as Walgreens drugstores. Although Walgreens never revealed the total number of stores it acquired from El Amal, industry sources confirmed it didn't acquire all 20 included in the original offer. Some locations, such as the Isla Verde El Amal, were still being remodeled. Walgreens' aggressive conversion schedule was expected to further strengthen its market leadership, as Rhode Island–based CVS Pharmacy prepared to enter the local market. As reported earlier, El Amal, Puerto Rico's second largest drugstore chain, announced the sale of 20 of its 60 locations and the decision to transform its remaining 40 stores into new clinical centers. While terms of the sale transaction to Walgreens were undisclosed, it would help fund the $25 million transformation of El Amal stores, as the chain moved to become a network of clinical centers. Future El Amal clinical centers were expected to provide such specialty pharmacy services as infusions, preventive health and nutritional services. The new El Amal format would still carry a limited retail selection.

On March 20, 2009, Farmacias El Amal the largest local pharmacy chain on the Island at the time filed for protection under the federal Bankruptcy Law after incurring debts amounting to approximately $75 million.

On February 24, 2011, it was reported that Farmacias El Amal customers and employees alike arrived to find the drugstores shuttered Farmacias El Amal, the island's second largest drugstore chain, filed for Chapter 11 bankruptcy (reorganization) protection in March 2009 and moved forward with a massive reorganization of its operations. The move left the chain with a sharply reduced network of 22 stores, about half the number before the bankruptcy filing. The locally held company amended the filing to Chapter 7 (liquidation) last May. However, El Amal President Mohammad Yassin, the founder of the chain, announced in June of that year that the company would spend $5 million to remodel its 22 stores and spend another $1 million on a media blitz to reposition the local chain within the competitive market that had seen the growth of national powerhouses Walgreens and CVS.

On May 4, 2011, it was reported that nearly three months after abruptly closing down local drugstore chain and filing for Chapter 11 bankruptcy protection, El Amal was liquidating the inventory it had left, the company in charge of the transaction announced in an ad published Tuesday. More than $3 million worth of products formerly in stock at 14 El Amal locations had been consolidated at two locations in Toa Baja and Carolina, and were being sold at a 60 percent discount through Saturday. Company President Mohammad Yassin told lawmakers during a hearing Tuesday that unfair competition on the island was to blame for El Amal's disappearance. When the company filed for Chapter 11 protection on February 24 of that year, it reported $30 million in debt. The executive said El Amal was unable to compete fairly with powerful rival Walgreens, which Yassin said was given “special benefits.” “I believe there should have been more regulations to ease competition and make sure that every competitor had the chance to compete head-on, without an advantage or disadvantage,” said Yassin during testimony offered in a public hearing of the House Consumer Affairs Committee chaired by Rep. Jorge Navarro. “For many years we battled against a company like Walgreens and suggested a law as simple as legally requiring a drug maker that grants benefits to Walgreens, to grant them to community pharmacies as well.” The hearing was held to analyze the process the company followed when it shut down without warning on February 18, disregarding regulations requiring drugstores to give prior notice to its patients about its plans to close. El Amal came under fire by local health officials who were flooded with complaints from patients whose access to prescription medications were cut off when stores closed. Yassin said the company had exhausted all of the possibilities it had to remain open, saying El Amal was a victim of the island's regulatory framework. “We have been victims in this. If we would have had the tools to compete on better ground where everybody is standing at the same level, we would have achieved more,” he said. “If you ask me what the most appropriate legislative tool would be, I would say that lawmakers should demand that there are equal opportunities.” Although he did not mention it, it was widely known that large retail chains use their leverage to buy in bulk at lower prices, which they would often pass down to consumers as discounts at the register. Smaller companies, such as El Amal, that lack the same buying power had to keep their prices at a certain level to make money.
