= Casiano Communications =

Publisher of Caribbean Business news

formerly Casiano Communications, Inc. - today: Latin Media House, LLC
- Company type: Private
- Industry: Publishing, Contact Center, Newsstand distribution and Content creation
- Founded: San Juan (1973) San Juan (2015)
- Headquarters: San Juan, Puerto Rico
- Key people: Heiko Faass, Chief Executive Officer and Editor in Chief
- Products: Magazines, periodicals, marketing, telemarketing and Contact Center, Websites, advertising
- Number of employees: 220 (2016)
- Website: caribbeanbusiness.com imagen.pr buenavida.pr drsi.pr lmh.pr

Latin Media House, LLC acquired the assets of Casiano Communications Inc. (CCI) effective November 2, 2015 from Chapter 11 at the US Bankruptcy Court. The original company was founded in 1973, by Manuel A. Casiano, who died on May 19, 2017, at the age of 86. Casiano Communications started out publishing a business and financial newsletter on Puerto Rico which evolved over 45 years into the largest English speaking weekly paper Caribbean Business. Latin Media House continues to publish and expand the existing publications like Caribbean Business, Imagen, Buena Vida or Book of Lists. The group is lead since its inception by chief executive officer and Editor in Chief Heiko Faass and employs approximately 200 persons.

== History ==
Recognizing the unfilled niche that an area business publication would fill, Mr. Casiano launched the newsletter that would later evolve into what is now Caribbean Business newspaper. For forty-three years, it had been the recognized Business Authority in Puerto Rico and the region. It was published weekly in English, and its in-depth news and analysis was read by people in the White House, the U.S. Congress, Wall Street, by Puerto Rico bond investors, the parent companies and suppliers of companies in Puerto Rico and many others. Daily business news was provided on its website, CB.pr, where it attracted more than 153,000 unique visitors a month.

In the late 1980s, its annual Caribbean Business Book of Lists was launched, with rankings of leading companies in Puerto Rico, by industry. The list provides information on 129 local industries, more than 1500 companies, and a guide on how to do business in Puerto Rico. It has since been published every year. In 1988 Manuel A. Casiano's daughter Kimberly Casiano became an executive in the company rising to president in 1994.

While various magazines had been launched in Puerto Rico, none were truly successful because they could not compete with the quality of the magazines in Spanish that were being imported from South America. Those magazines did not include local coverage and Mr. Casiano wanted to publish a magazine that reflected Puerto Rico's people, events, the problems facing the island and so CCI began launching a new series of magazines. The various magazines cover women's and family lifestyles, health, a wedding guide, a mothers guide, a decoration guide, a baby boomers magazine for those 50 years old and over, a Quinceañera- teen girl's magazine, and the ¡Qué Pasa! tourism guide.

In 2014, after losing several key Direct ResponSource contact center accounts amid Puerto Rico's ongoing depression, Casiano Communications and its sister operations, Direct ResponSource Inc. filed for Chapter 11 bankruptcy protection. After almost a year of court battle, in August 2015 the US Bankruptcy Court in San Juan, Puerto Rico, approved the proposed restructuring plan of a consortium of Puerto Rican business men around Miguel A. Ferrer, led by German financier and entrepreneur Heiko Faass, who resides in Puerto Rico. The court approved the acquisition of the assets of both Casiano Communications, Inc. and DirectResponSource, Inc. which were ultimately assigned to Latin Media House, LLC and DRSI Call Center, LLC, together doing business as Grupo LMH

Latin Media House, based in Puerto Rico, stated that the focus for its lead publication, Caribbean Business, would be on a digital edition featuring news about Puerto Rico, Dominican Republic, Cuba, and other islands in the Caribbean and that there would be an effort to add subscribers living in the mainland United States. The founder and editor-in-chief of the defunct Casiano Communication, Manuel Casiano, was contracted to serve as an adviser to the new ownership group through November, 2016.

== Circulation numbers ==
An estimated 70% of Puerto Rico's adults read one or more Casiano Communications publications each month. In 2000, the company unveiled a new search engine and web portal dedicated exclusively for Puerto Rico. The website was called "Puerto Rico WOW!" and had a digital business directory. The website received an average of 19 million hits a month and 191,000 pages are viewed daily per WebTrends.

In 2008, Puerto Rico WOW! was converted into www.caribbeanbusinessPR.com, which went on to surpass WOW! in terms of traffic and ad revenue. Another website, www.TVaquiPR.com, was also launched in 2008 as a complement to its namesake weekly celebrity gossip magazine, TVaquí, no longer published.

== Publications ==
Casiano Communications publications.

Name	Type	Themes	Estimated Circulation
Agenda De Decoración	semi-annual magazine, Spanish-language	home decorations	40,000 (semi-annually)
Agenda Para La Novia	annual magazine, Spanish-language	wedding planning	40,000 (annually)
Agenda Para Mama	annual magazine, Spanish-language	pregnancy and child care	40,000 (annually)
Agenda Para La Quinceañera	magazine, Spanish-language	Quinceañera	20,000 (annually)
Buenavida	monthly magazine, Spanish-language	quality-of-life, prevention and healthy lifestyle	63,000 (monthly)
Caribbean Business	weekly newspaper, English-language	business issues in Puerto Rico, the Caribbean and the United States	45,000 (weekly) website
Caribbean Business Book of Lists	annual guide, English-language	ranks the 1,600 largest companies in Puerto Rico, categorized by industry segment (e.g. banking, manufacturing, pharmaceutical, etc.)	35,000 (annually)
Caribbean Business to Business Directory (online at )	directory of private, public, governmental, and non-profit companies and organizations in Puerto Rico		
Imagén	monthly magazine, Spanish-language	women's and family lifestyle	80,000 (monthly)
Que Pasa – P. R. Travel & Tourism	bi-monthly magazine, English- and Spanish-languages	travel and tourism; official magazine of Puerto Rico Tourism Company	127,000 (bi-monthly)
TVaqui	weekly digest-sized glossy magazine, Spanish-language	celebrity news and gossip, VidaActual Aqui section, health, puzzles	200,000 (weekly) website:
