= Barker's Discount Department Stores =

American chain of discount department stores

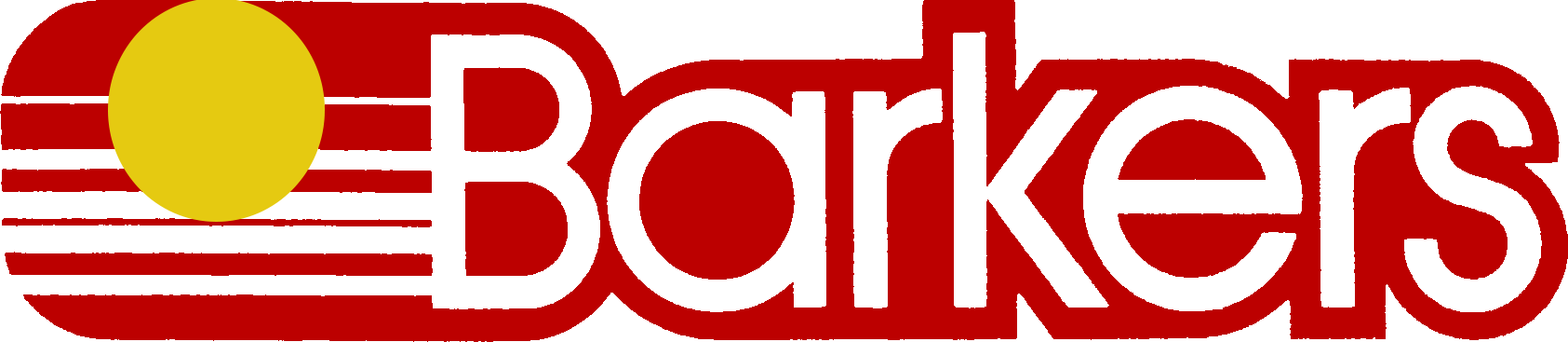
Barker's final logo

Barker's Discount Department Stores was a chain of discount department stores founded in May 1957 by Felix Mininberg and Irving Barker. As one of the first hard goods discounters, and with creative promotions, the initial store, in Orange, Connecticut, grew quickly with a wide variety of products for the home arranged in a supermarket style. This success spawned a second 40,000 sq. ft. location in Wallingford, Connecticut in 1960. The company was sold to Franklin Stores Corporation in 1961, and then grew quickly throughout the Northeast and South Central United States, the Caribbean, and the United States Virgin Islands. Irving Barker left Franklin Stores Corporation in 1963 and started his own discount store, Sabers. Felix Mininberg stayed on as vice president. Mininberg's main position was to find locations for the new stores and oversee the building of each new store.

== Information ==
=== Business layout ===
Barker's invested heavily in imports which they purchased directly from manufacturers, which played a major role in their discounting plans. They made use of import distributors domestically, as well as direct buying from overseas. Barkers belief was that to offer discounts, they must offer a wide variety of brand names, private brands, imports and domestic labels. Barkers layout was mostly the same as other retailers. They had departments featuring furniture, electrical, hardware, clothing, health and beauty aids, records, books, TVs, cameras, automotive, camping, bicycles, garden, etc.

=== Slogans ===
The slogan they used was "Pay Less For The Best".

=== Competition ===
Barkers, like other department stores, had its share of competition, including Nichols Discount City, Bradlees, King's Department Stores and Caldor.

== History ==
=== Successful years: 1957–1979 ===
Barker's was founded in May, 1957 by Irving Barker and Felix Mininberg, in Orange, Connecticut. As one of the first hard goods discounters and with creative price and entertainment promotions, Barker's grew quickly from its $20,000 initial investment. Following the opening of a second store in Wallingford, Connecticut in September, 1960, Barker's had gross sales of $7 million (~$58.3 million in 2025). The company was acquired by Franklin Stores Corporation in 1961. Paul Panagrosso was one of the founding employees who was instrumental in designing and setting up the initial store that would then grow into a multimillion-dollar regional empire.

Under Franklin, Barker's began a period of 19 years in business. Between 1961 and 1970, Barker's would open over 11 more stores. From 1970 to 1975, Barker's would become one of the nations fastest growing retail chains in the United States, opening almost 20 stores alone in New York State. In 1976, Barkers would open up several former W.T. Grant store locations in central New York. Irving Barker remained with Franklin Stores until 1963.

=== Downfall and closure: 1980–1984 ===
After years of prosperity, Barkers was on its downfall, along with several other major retailers. King's Department Stores Inc. (later renamed KDT Industries, Inc) acquired the financially ailing Barkers for $30 million (~$98.3 million in 2025) in August 1980. Included in this deal was the 125 Franklin Store chain, a women's specialty shop retailer. Barker's stores retained their name until early 1981, when most Barker's were renamed King's. Barker's stores not purchased by King's were either closed or sold to other retailers. At the time of this purchase, Barker's operated 63 stores. Only the stores in Louisiana, Puerto Rico and Virgin Islands retained the Barker's name. KDT Industries, under a reorganization plan, would finally close all Louisiana Barker's stores on October 24, 1982. Their Puerto Rico stores were converted to Kmart stores throughout 1983 and 1984. A location example is Humacao, Puerto Rico.

A store in San Antonio, Texas was converted into Globe Discount City. the store later became Kmart and closed in 2003 and is now the headquarters of San Antonio Police Department.
