= Pueblo Supermarkets =

Supermarket chain based in Puerto Rico

- Type: Grocery
- Industry: Retail
- Founded: 1955
- Headquarters: San Juan, Puerto Rico
- Area served: Puerto Rico and U.S. Virgin Islands
- Products: Bakery, dairy, deli, frozen foods, general grocery, meat, pharmacy, produce, seafood, snacks, liquor
- Owner: Ramón Calderón
- Divisions: Pueblo USVI
- Subsidiaries: Amigo Supermarkets
- Website: https://puebloweb.com

Pueblo is a Puerto Rican supermarkets chain. It has been one of Puerto Rico's major supermarket chains since 1955. Pueblo operates supermarkets in Puerto Rico and the U.S. Virgin Islands.

== History ==
The brainchild of brothers Harold Toppel and George Toppel, sons of Russian immigrant parents, Pueblo began as a single store operation on Roosevelt Avenue in the Puerto Nuevo section of San Juan, Puerto Rico. The success of the first store led the Toppels to open 43 other Pueblo Supermarkets around the Island and, by 1960, to convert the enterprise into a public company that began trading on the New York Stock Exchange.

In 1963, Pueblo expanded beyond Puerto Rico's shores to the US Virgin Islands. Pueblo opened stores in St. Thomas and St. Croix.

The company also introduced the trademark Pueblo which included items from paper towels to rice.

In 1983, Pueblo launched the Xtra Super Food Centers concept, a discount warehouse supermarket which allowed the customer to shop for groceries in a larger store format featuring lower prices with stores located in Puerto Rico and the state of Florida. The lower prices were made possible by the elimination of some services, such as baggers. In 1989, Pueblo acquired the franchise rights to develop Blockbuster Video Stores in Puerto Rico and the US Virgin Islands. The first Blockbuster Video store opened in Puerto Rico on June 27, 1990, at Campo Rico Avenue in Carolina, next to the Administration Office and Distribution Center.

=== Bankruptcy ===
In 2003, Pueblo faced financial troubles and there were rumors of a potential buyer from Venezuela. In 2007, Pueblo faced serious financial difficulties again, as many locations were sold to other competitors. Some were acquired and taken over by rival supermarkets Econo, Grande, COOP and Supermax.

=== Bidding and Pueblo, Inc. (f/k/a as PS Acquisition) ===
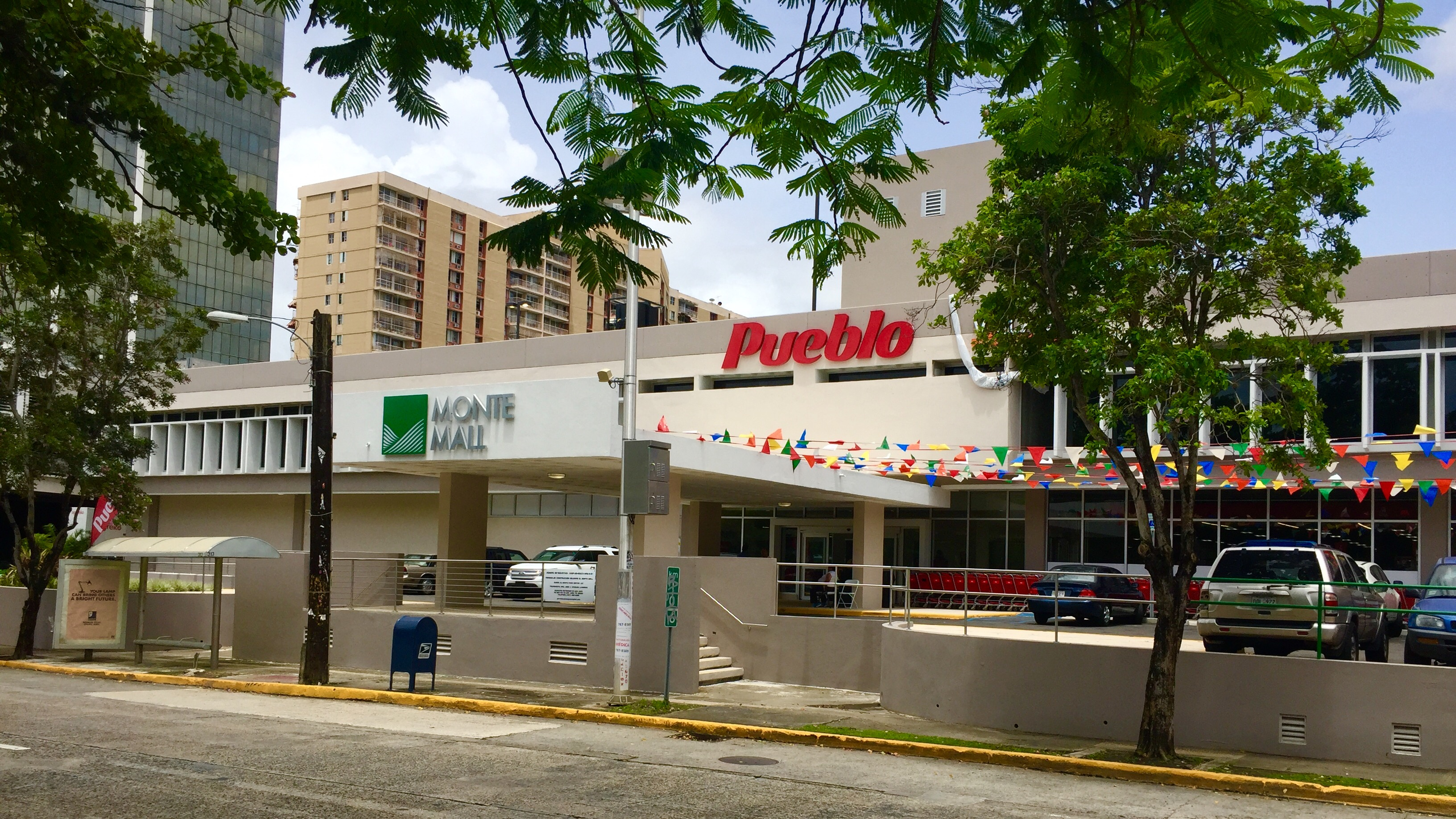
Monte Mall Pueblo

The entire chain was auctioned in September 2007 as part of the Chapter 11 Bankruptcy process, where a bid by Ramón Calderón president of Holsum of Puerto Rico (a baker goods company) for $139 million succeeded in taking over the rest of its operations. The Bankruptcy Court in Delaware approved the transaction. The new company expected to restructure Pueblo in an effort to revive the brand.

In September, 2009 Pueblo, Inc. sold its flagship store in Campo Rico Avenue, Carolina (next to their Corporate Headquarters and Distribution Center) to Econo Supermarkets.

In April 2012, Pueblo acquired two former Supermercados Selectos stores in Southeast Puerto Rico and converted them into Pueblo, in Arroyo and Guayama.

In February, 2014, Pueblo opened a new store in Ciudadela, Santurce.

In May, 2016, Pueblo relocated their Monte Mall store in Hato Rey from the first level of the Mall to the second one facing Luis Muñoz Rivera Ave. on a bigger space of 34,000 sq. feet incorporating the Village concept.

=== Pueblo Supermarkets acquisition of Amigo Supermarkets ===
In June 2022, Pueblo Supermarkets announced that it would be buying the 11 Amigo Supermarkets from Walmart, the name would stay and the 1,100 employees would keep their jobs. On August 26, 2022, the transition from Amigo to Pueblo supermarkets began.

== Blockbuster Video Franchise ==
On June 27, 1990, it was reported that Pueblo International had inaugurated its first video store "Blockbuster Video" on Campo Rico Avenue in Carolina. The store was a subsidiary of Pueblo International, which had purchased the franchise for Puerto Rico and the U.S. Virgin Islands, for an undisclosed amount, from the BLOCKBUSTER Entertainment Corporation (BEC), which was the largest video-movie rental chain in the world at the time. At the opening ceremony, then Pueblo International president David Morrow said that with the first store the company began a successful chain of video stores in Puerto Rico and the Virgin Islands. Pueblo had entered this business because they understood that the Blockbuster concept was the future in the video rental industry, the executive also indicated. Marrow would not publicly indicate the amount of money that was paid for the franchise, he said that Pueblo would also pay, as part of the agreement, a royalty on sales volume to Blockbuster Entertainment. The store, which was built at a cost of $250,000, measured more than 6,000 square feet and had more than 10,000 videos in 30 categories. Filiberto Berríos, then general manager of the chain of stores, said that Pueblo had plans to open two more in the metropolitan area, have nine in operation by the end of 1991 and 22 in Puerto Rico and the Virgin Islands by 1992. Morrow explained that the second store would open on Piñeiro Avenue in Río Piedras and the location of the third was reserved because it was still under negotiation. When asked, the president of Pueblo ruled out that the chain was going to compete directly with the video clubs that Pueblo already had developed in some of its stores and Pueblo Xtras. "We have 11 video stores operating in our stores and we expect to open another four this year, so we will continue to expand in that area and we do not anticipate closing any of the video stores that are already in operation”, Morrow said. Elvin Santiago was named manager of the first store, which would have a total of 28 employees.

=== Closure ===
On June 3, 2013, it was reported that Blockbuster had spent some past three months quietly closing its stores in Puerto Rico, a market it would possibly be exiting that summer. Since January of that year, the chain had closed several stores, such as in Plaza Río Hondo and the San Patricio Plaza, and that past week it had begun liquidating stores in Caguas, Cupey, De Diego Avenue in San Juan, Plaza Carolina and Rexville Plaza in Bayamón. During an informal round of the stores that were holding close out sales, it was confirmed that most, if not all locations would be shuttered by August of that year. The Blockbuster chain had undergone a significant transformation about four years earlier, when local franchisee BB Entertainment of Puerto Rico, LLC, which was headed by entrepreneur Susana Santamaría, invested about $1 million to purchase 13 locations from the Colorado-based corporation. That transaction, which secured the Blockbuster operation in Puerto Rico and the U.S. Virgin Islands, markedly whittled down the chain's presence from the 40 stores it had at the height of its success. By this point the chain had already closed stores in Hato Rey, Isla Verde, Plaza del Norte in San Juan, Fajardo, Mayagüez, and Aguadilla. The closings of local Blockbuster locations in Puerto Rico and the USVI mirrored what has been taking place stateside, where parent company Dish Network had announced that January that it planned to shutter 300 stores across the U.S. "soon." By June 20, 2013, it was reported that after almost four years of having acquired the Blockbuster store chain in Puerto Rico, Susana Santamaría would be closing the following month the last stores that were still open.

== See also ==
- List of supermarket chains
