= Centro Gran Caribe =

Shopping mall located in Vega Alta, Puerto Rico

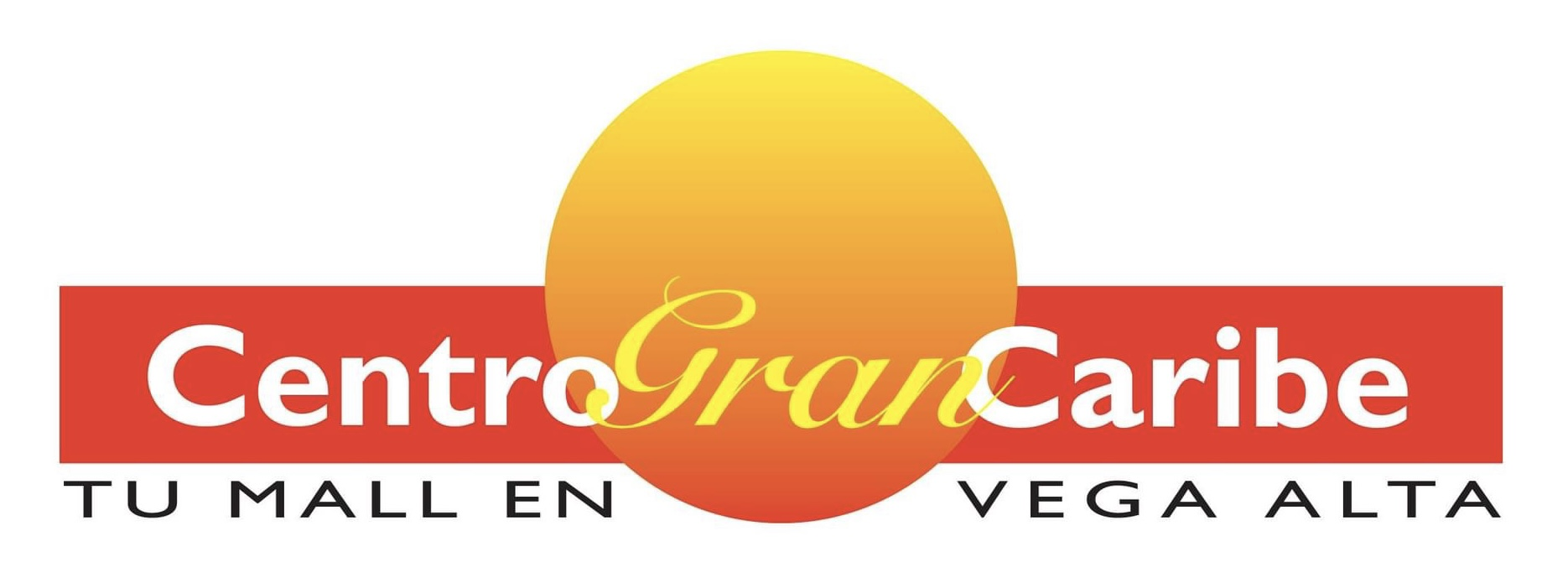
- Location: Vega Alta, Puerto Rico
- Coordinates: 18°24′40″N 66°19′16″W
- Address: Carr No. 2 Km 29.7 Vega Alta, Puerto Rico 00682
- Opened: 19 November 1987
- Previous names: Plaza Caribe Mall, The Gallery at Gran Caribe
- Developer: Decemcor, Inc.
- Owner: Pitirre Management Company Inc.
- Architect: Ray Meléndez y Asociados of San Juan and Spillis Candelas & Partners, Inc.
- Num. of stores: 100+
- Num. of anchor tenants: 5
- Floor area: 387,000 sq ft (36,000 m^{2})
- Floors: 2
- Parking: 2,000+
- Website: http://www.centrograncaribe.com/

Centro Gran Caribe, formerly known as the Plaza Caribe Mall, and later also known as The Gallery at Gran Caribe, is an enclosed shopping mall in Vega Alta, Puerto Rico. Anchor stores for the mall are Selectos Supermarkets, ChinaTown, both of which reside in the former Kmart space at the mall, TJ Maxx, Capri, and Grand Way. The mall also contains a Caribbean Cinemas.

== History ==
=== Development and opening: 1980s ===
On September 27, 1986, it was reported that the Plaza Caribe Mall, was already in an advanced stage of construction, according to project developers. The center, would have more than 160,000 square feet, around 50 stores and was at the time almost entirely leased. Plaza Caribe Mall would capture the market area west of Bayamón and specifically the municipalities of Toa Baja (west), Toa Alta, Dorado, Vega Alta, Vega Baja, Manatí, Corozal, Morovis and Naranjito, all of them being less than 20 miles from the Mall. The developers of the shopping mall Decemcor, Inc., had taken special care in selecting the stores that made up the Plaza Caribe Mall, so that these would become the leading retail stores at the mall, both in "fast food" and other areas. Pre-lease contracts had been signed with 40 stores, which would be formalized in those coming weeks. Among the main establishments in the center would be Burger King, Church's Chicken, Pizza Hut, Amigo Supermarkets, Kress, Christie, Valú, Donato, Me Salvé, Pearle Vision, Humberto Vidal, Butler and Banco Popular, among others. With a unique architectural design, the center had been designed with the amenities and environment it offered as its main objective. It was on par with the newest shopping centers in the United States at the time. The architectural and engineering firm of Ray Meléndez y Asociados of San Juan and Spillis Candelas & Partners, Inc., of Miami, Florida, had produced a central mall concept flanked by stores on both sides, with a skylight on the roof of the shopping mall that from 30 feet high illuminated it with natural light. Fountains, a carousel, a gazebo for exhibitions, as well as small squares with comfortable benches and natural trees would give shoppers the family atmosphere that would make Plaza Caribe Mall the right place for family shopping. According to Ramón J. Ruiz, leasing manager of the Mall, it was expected to open in May 1987.

On August 4, 1987, it was reported that the Plaza Caribe Mall, which represented an investment of approximately $10.2 million, would be inaugurated at the end of that October or beginning of that next November. The commercial complex, with a gross leasable area of 155 thousand square feet, marked what could be described as a rebirth in the development of shopping centers on the Island. The industry had been going through a virtual lethargy for at least six years, since the excessive increases in bank interest rates caused by the oil crisis. Among the shopping centers particular architectural details, a novel interior promenade stood out with cathedral type ceilings, 32 feet high, covered with skylights along the entire length of the promenade to allow the entry of natural light during the day. A series of small interior plazas, in the style of those in Old San Juan, with their benches and lanterns, would give a touch of relaxation and attractiveness to the interior of the shopping center. There would also be two large gazebos for special activities and exhibitions, a machine for children, and two fountains with waterfalls would also be part of the decoration on the central promenade. "Plaza Caribe Mall reflects the new approach of the shopping center industry," said Mr. Erasmo Don-Zabala, president of the center's development firm, Decemcor, Inc. "It is the closed concept that provides families with a greater amount of amenities and variety in stores, as well as a pleasant environment to make their purchases." Partners of the Decemcor firm were the engineers Adriel Longo and Juan J. Bermúdez. The construction of the shopping center had begun in December 1986. Located in an area of 10 acres of land, Plaza Caribe Mall would have a total of 50 stores and a parking area for 700 vehicles. The center was financed with $6.7 in private funds from the Ponce Federal Bank and $2.5 million in funds from the federal Urban Development Action Grants (UDAG) program, managed by the mayor of Vega Alta, Manuel Chinea. During the construction phase, which was at the time close to completion, the project had generated an average of 250 direct and 300 indirect jobs. When the businesses would be operating, it was estimated that they would create 500 permanent jobs in the center. The new shopping complex would feature a variety of food retail businesses, including Burger King, Baskin Robbins, Church's fried chicken, Pizza Hut, a Chinese restaurant, a Creole food self-service, a bakery and a country food restaurant. These businesses would be located in different areas of the center, with access to both the interior promenade and the parking lot. This would allow these businesses to remain open even if the center was closed. Both Burger King and Church's will be in separate units near the main complex. The so-called anchor stores of Plaza Caribe would consist of a Amigo Supermarkets, of 23,000 square feet; a 21,000-foot Yayabo Extra discount store; and a 8,500 square foot Moscoso Superpharmacy. There would also be a Banco Popular branch in the center, Kress, Donato, Me Salvé, Christie, Sensación, Humberto Vidal, Valú, Gordon's Jewelry, Buttler, Flagg Bros., Kress Kids stores, among others. The shopping mall would also feature an area for professional offices. Plaza Caribe Mall would officially inaugurate on November 19, 1987.

On June 4, 1988, it was reported that just six months ago at the time, the Plaza Caribe Mall had inaugurated, and that the center had created permanent jobs and had generated great commercial activity for many municipalities. It had also raised the quality of life of families in those areas with healthy recreational opportunities in the area of their homes. Plaza Caribe consisted of two levels; 51 stores, two restaurants, professional offices, a radio station, two banking institutions and various facilities for the pleasure of families. Among its peculiarities, you could find the "cathedral" style ceilings and doors, a panoramic elevator, and a unique architectural design. Furthermore, for its appearance painted in white and green, it would be known as the "mall of green roofs".

=== Expanding: 1990s-2000s ===
On November 23, 1999, Centro Gran Caribe as it would be known from then on after renaming itself inaugurated its expansion, which was known as Centro Gran Caribe South, and which was linked to the northern area by a bridge that crossed State Highway 676 and united the two sections of Centro Gran Caribe. This bridge would be one with glass walls, on which a series of carts and entertainment machines were located. The southern area of Centro Gran Caribe consisted of one of its anchor stores Big Kmart, as well as more than 40 stores, it would also feature "El Palmar" a Food Court, in which you could see innovative architectural details. In addition, a 7-screen Caribbean Cinemas would be located adjacent to the "El Palmar" Food Court.

On November 22, 2001, it was reported that Centro Gran Caribe at the time celebrating its 14th anniversary, was welcoming two new tenants in that following month; Radio Shack which would occupy more than 2,500 square feet, and Dolar y Algo Extra which would establish its largest store on the island at more than 11,000 square feet. The space taken over by Dolar y Algo Extra was originally a Sears store. And although having a large Sears facade, it was a small, independent dealer.

On April 30, 2004, New York City based Thor Equities announced the acquisition of the 387,546 square foot Centro Gran Caribe mall in Vega Alta, for $61.5 million. The mall, located about 18 miles northwest of San Juan, would be renamed "The Gallery at Gran Caribe" to fit into the developer's portfolio of "Gallery" branded malls throughout the U.S. mainland. This was the first acquisition outside the continental United States for the national real estate investment and development firm. The Gallery at Gran Caribe was built in 1987 as Plaza Caribe Mall and was owned until being acquired by Thor Equities by local companies Decemcor SE. y PCME Commercial S.E. The mall, which was expanded to have two wings in 1999, at the time housed a tenant mix of more than 50 stores including anchor tenants Big Kmart, Amigo Supermarkets and a Caribbean Cinemas. Besides the main anchors, the mall's tenant roster included Radio Shack, Payless Shoe Source, KayBee Toys, Kress, Marianne, among others. The property also housed 12 medical offices and an 11 restaurant food court. The mall had less than 16,000 square feet of vacant retail space, Thor planned to expand the mall by about 20 percent to attract the big U.S. retailers as they moved into the area.

On January 13, 2005, it was reported that New York City based Thor Equities was scheduled to complete an estimated $2 million renovation of The Gallery at Gran Caribe, during the first quarter of 2005 to make the property more attractive to consumers and future tenants. The Gallery at Gran Caribe was Puerto Rico's 20th largest shopping center, as reported in the Caribbean Business White Pages 2004 directory which was the investment company's first incursion into the local market. Thor Equities acquired the mall, originally called Centro Gran Caribe, in May 2004 from Decemcor for $61.5 million. The renovation, a $1.5 million to $2 million investment, is 80% complete and would be finished early that year, said Marketing Director Carl Reggie. Changes included remodeling of the skywalk that connected the mall's two wings, adding pushcarts, repainting the mall inside and out, and retiling the floors. "The response from customers, the mall's team, and tenants [to the renovation] has been very positive," Reggie said, adding there was a possibility that the 388,000 square foot mall could undergo further structural changes in the future. Reggie stressed the fact that Thor Equities had strong relationships with U.S. based retailers that had stores in the company's stateside shopping malls, which could lead to new players in the Puerto Rico market.

On June 22, 2006, it was reported that Thor Equities was considering selling The Gallery at Gran Caribe, and were actively marketing it. This didn't mean the company wanted to pull out of Puerto Rico, as it was also attempting to buy other retail properties on the island revealed Carl Reggie, marketing director. Although Reggie couldn't disclose the asking price for the 387,500 square foot enclosed shopping center, industry sources said it was around $80 million. However, if the sale didn't go through, he said the company would try to refinance the loan taken to purchase the mall, but didn't offer any specific details. Reggie also disclosed that Thor Equities was looking for local properties to buy, particularly retail properties. "We are very familiar with Puerto Rico and know the market very well," Reggie indicated adding that sales per square foot at Gran Caribe had increased since the company purchased it but didn't say by how much. "This is one of our stronger properties."

=== 2010s, and on ===
On November 7, 2019, it was reported that 96 more Sears and Kmart stores were to shutter by February 2020. This included the Big Kmart store at Centro Gran Caribe.

On July 2, 2021, Centro Gran Caribe would officially announce the arrival of two new tenants which would replace the former Kmart space at the mall. This would consist of subdividing the space into a Selectos Supermarkets and a discount store ChinaTown.

On February 15, 2023, Selectos would inaugurate its new supermarket at the mall, being the 39th location in the chain. With an investment of $4.5 million, it is the largest supermarket in the chain.

On June 16, 2023, discount store ChinaTown & More would inaugurate its new store at the mall. The store would open up to the mall taking part of the former Big Kmart space.

== Current anchors ==
- Selectos Supermarkets
- ChinaTown & More
- TJ Maxx
- Capri
- Grand Way

== Former anchors ==
- Amigo Supermarkets
- Yayabo Extra discount store
- Moscoso Superpharmacy
- Big Kmart - closed in 2020
- Dolar y Algo Extra
- Sears
