= Galería Paseos =

Shopping mall located in San Juan, Puerto Rico

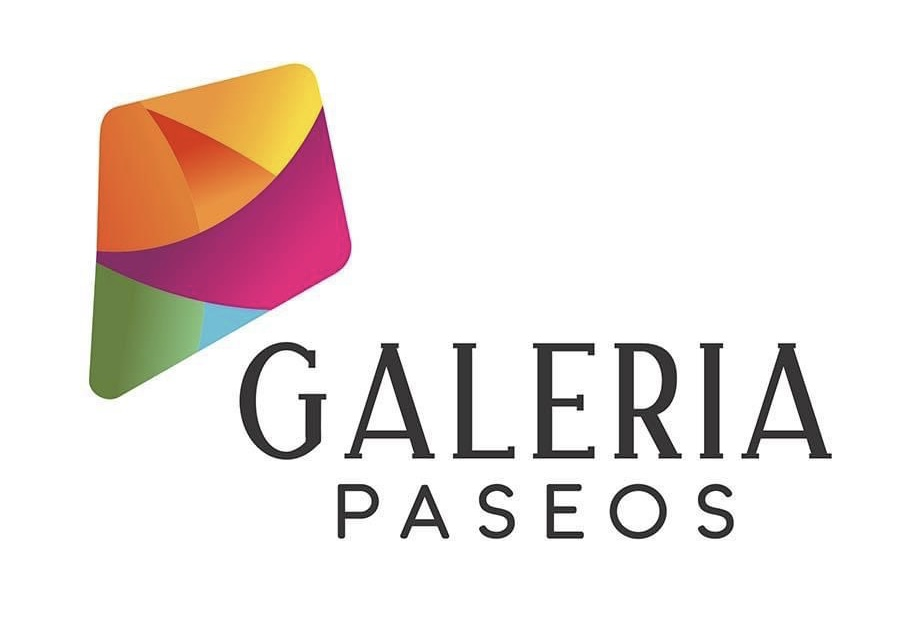
- Location: San Juan, Puerto Rico
- Coordinates: 18°21′23″N 66°3′49″W
- Address: 100 Ave. Grand Paseo Blvd. San Juan, Puerto Rico 00926
- Opened: Spring 1995
- Developer: Unicenter, S. E.
- Owner: Royal Properties, Inc.
- Num. of stores: 20+
- Num. of anchor tenants: 3
- Floor area: 209,859 sq ft (19,496.5 m^{2})
- Floors: 3
- Parking: 814
- Website: https://galeriapaseos.com/

Galería Paseos is an enclosed shopping mall in San Juan, Puerto Rico. Anchor stores for the mall are Aliss, Amigo Supermarkets, and a Walgreens. It was formerly anchored by a 2-level Sears store which closed in 2016, later being primarily replaced by Aliss.

== History ==
=== Opening and success: 1990s ===
In Spring 1995, being developed by Unicenter, S. E., Galería Paseos would open with 160,000 square feet with anchors Sears, Amigo Supermarkets and a Walgreens. Being located in the Los Paseos residential community in San Juan.

On October 25, 1995, it was reported that Pier 1 Imports had announced an agreement with Sears Roebuck de Puerto Rico to open six Pier 1 stores inside Sears department stores on the island. The new Pier 1 stores would have 2,000-3,000 square feet of sales space. The first two were scheduled to open in November of that year in the Sears store in Plaza las Américas in San Juan and in the Sears Homelife store in Galerías Paseos.

=== Acquiring and success: 2000s ===
On October 6, 2005, it was reported that Puerto Nuevo-based Caribbean Property Group (CPG) had purchased Cupey's Galería Paseos and planned to bring small retail shops to cater to the upscale Los Paseos residential area that is adjacent to the shopping mall. CPG had bought Galería Paseos from a developer at a price that wasn't being disclosed. Michael Lefkowitz, chief operating officer of CPG's commercial properties division, saw opportunities in Galería Paseos which then occupied 202,763 square feet, and even though a stroll through the mall would evidence a very high vacancy rate. He explained that the mall's former owner was a developer who didn't have expertise running shopping malls, while CPG did. "We intend to show quick results and are negotiating with top retailers who should be moving in by Christmas," he said, but didn't reveal their names, as leases hadn't been signed yet. "We believe Galería Paseos is a wonderful and well-built mall and intend to capitalize on the upscale demographics and great sales its three main anchors have," Lefkowitz explained. The anchors at the time were Sears Brand Central, Walgreens, and Amigo. According to the CPG executive, the Amigo at Galería Paseos was among the supermarket chain's best-performing stores.

On November 24, 2005, it was reported that six new stores were coming to Galería Paseos by the end of that year. These included, Ovalop; selling materials with which to create necklaces and other accessories, Barley Express; having hair accessories and jewelry, Disco Music Center; which offered the latest musical hits, ODA Moda; focusing on feminine apparel, Readers; featuring best-selling books, and Pequeña Ola; offering casual clothing for children. Galería Paseos had recently been acquired by Caribbean Property Group for an undisclosed amount. The new firm had also announced the shopping mall's food court was receiving two new tenants: Lolita's BBQ and Subway.

On December 6, 2007, it was reported that since first opening its doors, Galería Paseos had come of age and it now enjoyed a more diverse mix of tenants and increased consumer traffic. Once considered a boutique-style shopping center, it had blossomed into a thriving community mall with a variety of retailers and businesses that meet the needs of residents in the nearby, upscale Los Paseos neighborhood and surrounding communities. In those recent months there had been a wave of new tenants setting up shop in the mall. Some of the restaurants that could now be found in the food court included Taco Maker, Jake's Over the Top ice cream and the casual bistro Camille's Sidewalk Café. In addition, AT&T and Paseos Travel had recently opened service centers in the mall. “What's best is that our tenants are doing better than ever, even in this slow economic period," said Jeff Smith, vice president of asset management for Caribbean Property Group, owner of Galería Paseos. "There are three food retailers that are doing more than $1 million in sales and many are expanding." Smith said that some of the tenants that were now in the process of expanding included Banco Popular and Open Mobile, as well as Subway and Soup & Salad restaurants. He said others had made minor adjustments that had resulted in major sales increases, including Outback restaurant, which had become one of the first restaurants in its worldwide chain to open for lunch Monday through Sunday. Other success stories include the mall's first anchor tenant, Amigo, which was one of the supermarket chain's top stores that registered more than 12,000 daily transactions. Lady of America (a women-only gym franchise) was yet another great example of a business that started small and had grown to include an impressive 2,500 members. "With its nice ambiance, great mix of tenants and critical mass of retailers that draw traffic to it, we can truly say that Galería Paseos Mall is a thriving center for commerce," stated Smith.

On June 26, 2008, it was reported that Apparel wholesale/retail chain store Roma Inc., had opened its new 10,000 square foot store in the Galería Paseos Shopping Mall, May 24, after signing a commercial lease agreement with Puerto Nuevo-based Caribbean Property Group (CPG). Even though Roma already had a store at the Las Vistas Shopping Village, which is within walking distance from Galería Paseos, both companies agreed Galería Paseos was the perfect location for Roma to open its sixth apparel store in the metro area given the very strong, loyal client base it has established in the Los Paseos upscale residential area.

On February 12, 2009, it was reported that Galería Paseos continued to serve as an important neighborhood shopping destination for more than 500,000 people that the mall served. Among the center's most recent changes at the time were the reconfiguration of its food court area and the arrival of a new anchor tenant, Roma Outlet. The combined investment in these new retail arrivals represented an investment of more than $2 million and some 120 new jobs. "In times of economic recession, the food court area and mall restaurants become crucially important in not only generating sales but also attracting foot traffic for other inline tenants," explained Carlos Budet, president of FransGlobal, parent company of Taco Maker. His company was scheduled to open one of its other franchise formats, Chester's Chicken, that following month. In addition, FransGlobal operated a Camille's Sidewalk Café in one of the center's out-parcels. For John Regis, owner of Top Potato and Reggio's Pizza, the opportunity to open at Galería Paseos presented a good fit with the company's expansion plans. "It's a strong neighborhood enclave, surrounded by many urbanizations and strong vehicle traffic. We will be opening our 26th store in the mall," he said, at an estimated $200,000 investment. Other new food court arrivals were Bien Latino, formerly the Soup & Sandwich, which reconfigured its concept to feature an extended menu; and Red Point, which also remodeled its facilities and now offered an exciting Asian-cuisine menu. Already operating in the food court area were Buffalo Wings, Wendy's and Subway, which expanded its operation. Miguel Angel Mercedes, owner of the new Bebo's Café at Galería Paseos, had one of the two full-size dining operations at the shopping location. Still available was a 5,000 square foot dining space near the food court area, which was under negotiations with a Denny's-like family restaurant operation. That type of eatery would not only strengthen foot traffic to the mall, but also complement the area's weekend sales activity.

=== 2010s, and on ===
On March 4, 2016, it was reported that the Sears chain, confirmed that one of its stores on the Island would cease operations in the month of May. This was the Sears store at Galería Paseos, which was one of the anchor businesses in the shopping mall. Dave Rodney, president of the Sears and Kmart chains for Puerto Rico and the Virgin Islands, pointed out that the lease contract for the premises had expired and the corporation decided not to renew it. The executive did not specify the reasons for this, but said that in these cases the company took into account, among other factors, how the business is going, the requests of the property owner and the situation of the economy. The final closing of said store would be on May 31, but as soon as March 11, the inventory liquidation sale would begin. The Galería Paseos store employed 35 people.

On January 30, 2019, it was reported that with a large space of over 20,000 square feet and the most advanced fitness technology in Puerto Rico, the gym chain HCOA Fitness had inaugurated its new UNISEX establishment in Galería Paseos, taking up part of the former space left by Sears.

On June 25, 2019, it was reported that frozen yogurt franchise Yogen Früz had reopened its kiosk at the Galería Paseos shopping mall, investing some $75,000 in the operation.

On August 15, 2019, it was reported that the desolated Galería Paseos shopping mall was for sale for $13.5 million. On a tour of the property at the time, multiple empty spaces and little public were observed.

On November 6, 2019, it was reported that after several years on the market, the Galería Paseos shopping mall had found a new owner, who had bought the property that was in the hands of FirstBank. Iris González, vice president of Public Relations at FirstBank, confirmed the sale. "Galería Paseos has a new owner. On September 30, the transaction was closed," said the executive. González did not want to disclose how much the property sold for. It was being marketed in the classifieds for $13.5 million. Sources from El Nuevo Día, who preferred not to identify themselves, indicated that the new owner is Royal Properties, Inc., a real estate company that had a business relationship with the Aliss store chain. The property, with 209,859 square feet, had as anchor stores Amigo Supermarkets, the Walgreens pharmacy and the Denny's restaurant. Another tenant was the HCOA gym. The shopping center had been repossessed by Firstbank. It had around twenty stores during this time, including Roma, The Fashion Lounge, Subway and Me Salvé, as well as another dozen service businesses, including Banco Popular, Claro, 5aSec and a laboratory.

On January 16, 2021, Aliss, a department store chain on the island, would inaugurate its new store at Galería Paseos. It would open on the main level of the former Sears space which had been vacant since the closure of the store in 2016.

On December 20, 2022, it was reported that the Boronea clothing store and brand, distinguished for its Caribbean fashion for men with original collections, had announced the recent opening of its new location in the Galería Paseos shopping mall.
