= Plaza del Carmen Mall =

Shopping mall located in Caguas, Puerto Rico

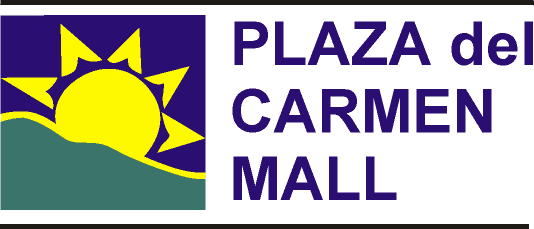

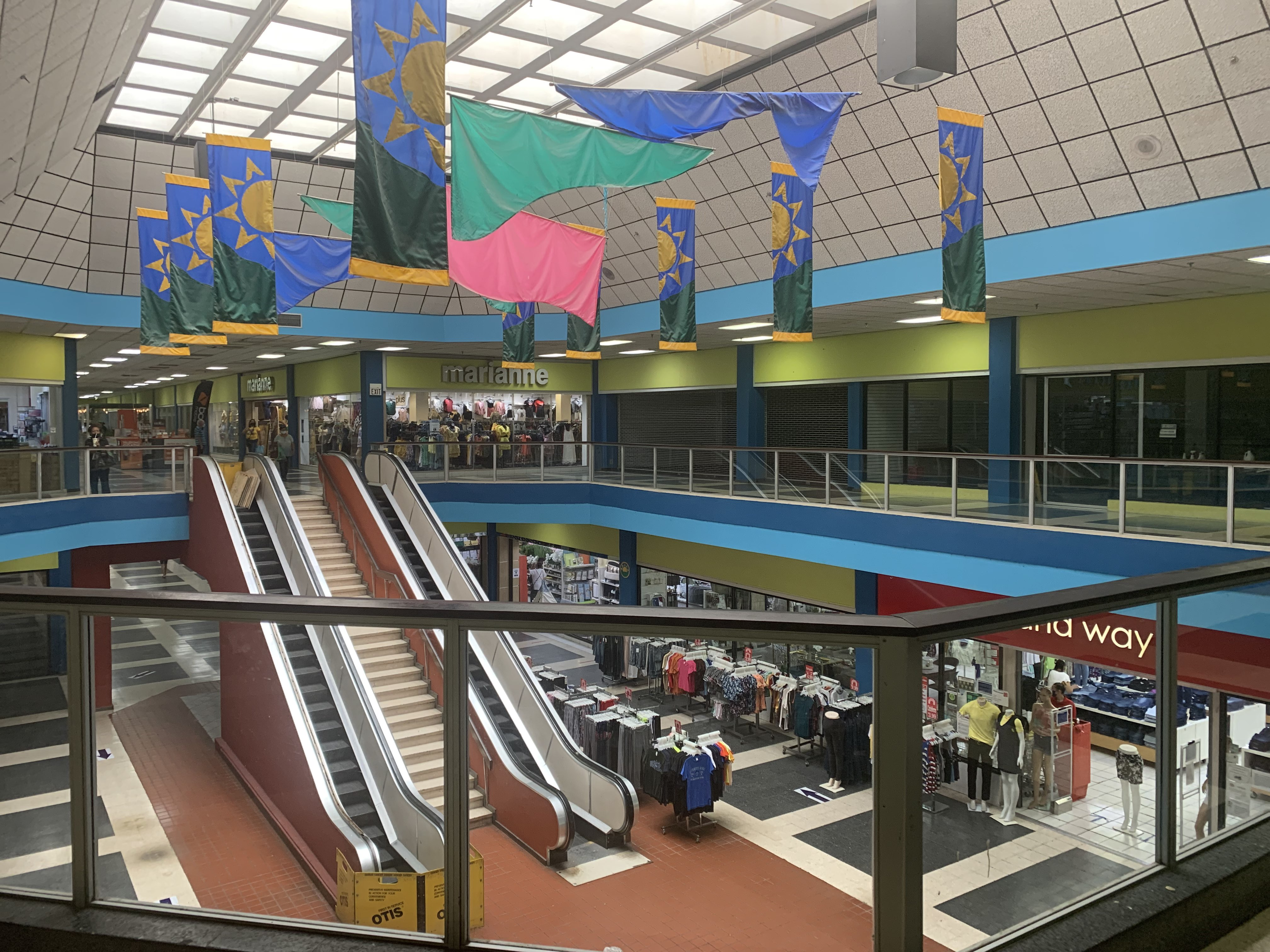
- Center court at the mall in 2021.
- Location: Caguas, Puerto Rico
- Coordinates: 18°13′02″N 66°02′37″W
- Address: PR-1 int. PR-172
- Opened: 26 November 1976
- Developer: Turabo Shopping Center, Inc.
- Manager: Winer Property Group
- Owner: Downtown Development Corp.
- Architect: Carlos Sanz
- Num. of stores: 50+
- Num. of anchor tenants: 4 (3 open, 1 vacant)
- Floor area: 176,115 sq ft (16,361.6 m^{2})
- Floors: 2
- Parking: 720+
- Website: www.winerproperty.com/id/362

Plaza del Carmen Mall is a two-story enclosed shopping mall in Caguas, Puerto Rico. It is currently anchored by an Outlet China; a discount store, a Grand Way; a department store, and an Advance Auto Parts. It is also home to a Farmacias Caridad; a pharmacy. It was formerly also anchored by a Fallas Discount Stores which closed in 2020, the space remaining vacant.

== History ==
=== Early development ===
Plans for the construction of Plaza del Carmen began in 1960, but the development was halted until 1973 by the Planning Board and the Department of Commerce who considered that a center of its size in the Caguas area was not warranted by then.

In 1973, under the development of Turabo Shopping Center, Inc., plans for the construction of the commercial complex of $12 million were approved, with plans of a two level, approximately 232,000 square feet of retail space designed by architect Carlos Sanz to lease to commercial businesses.

=== Opening and success: 1970s-1980s ===
In November 1975, CO-OP Supermarkets inaugurated their store at the mall, multiple artists made appearances on different dates through the inauguration ceremonies for the store such as Carmita Jiménez, Rosita Rodríguez, Las Caribelles, Braulio Castillo, and others.

On November 13, 1976, a moment of a toast for the good luck of the new Plaza Del Carmen Mall project, in Caguas, appeared Mr. Alberto González, left, President of the firm González Padin & Co.; Emma Sara Portela, president of C.I.M.S, coordinators and leasing agents of the project; and Mr. Adrián Pérez Agudo, then president and owner of the aforementioned shopping center, whose inauguration was planned in great detail, and would include a grand reception. It was reported that this new González Padín facility would be one of its most modern stores.

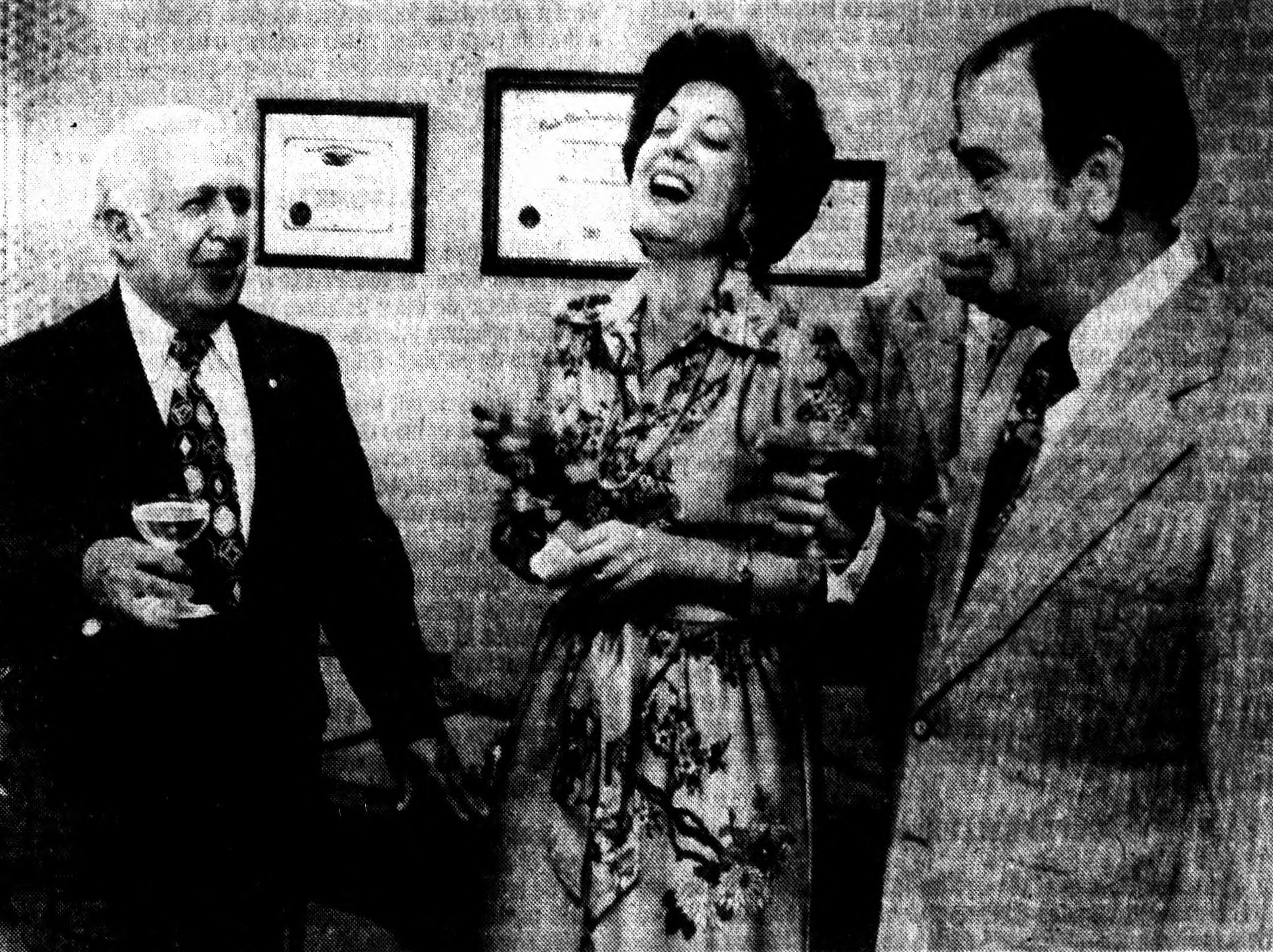
Toast for the new project in 1976

First opening to special guests on the 24th. On November 26, 1976. Plaza del Carmen Mall opened to the public with 40 stores. Among those 40 stores the mall had González Padín, and CO-OP Supermarkets as its main anchors. The mall also housed other establishments at the time such as Western Auto, Banco de Ponce, Marianne Stores, Kinney Shoes, Clubman, Flagg Bros., Cine Foto, and many others. Gittys Toys a chain of toy stores, would later go on to open a 1,844 square foot store at the shopping mall. It was the third store in the chain at the time.

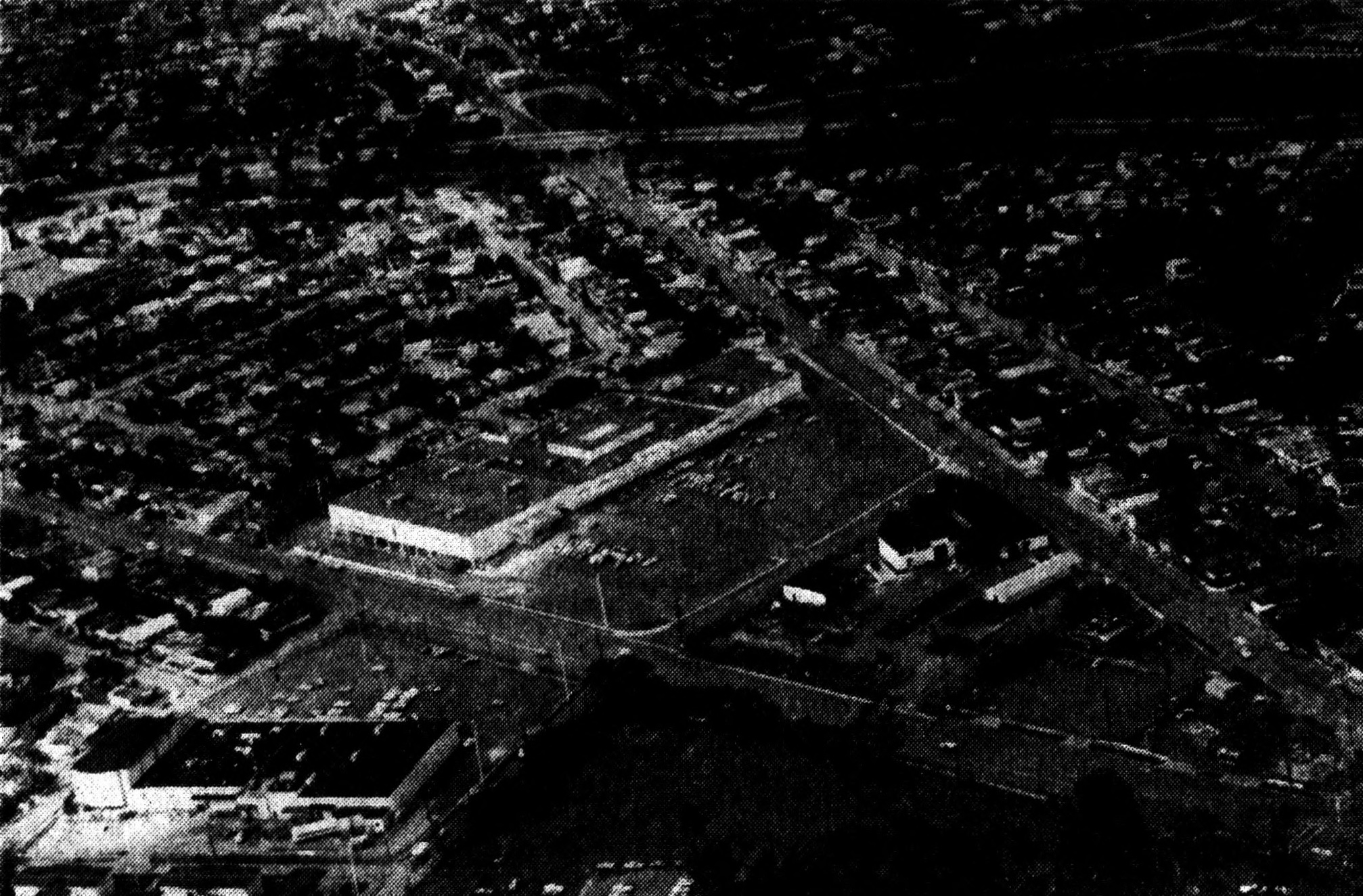
Aerial in 1976

On December 3, 1976, an interesting demonstration of household clothes would take place at the González Padín store in the Plaza del Carmen Mall throughout the day. Halston, exclusive designer for Fieldcrest, created a collection of clothing designs for the bedroom and bathroom. The demonstrator would illustrate the different ways sheets, pillowcases and towels could be used, both decoratively and for personal use.

In March 1977, a Howard Johnson's Restaurant would open at the mall, the only restaurant of the chain at the time located outside the metropolitan area, it was a stand out for its many offerings, prices, and service.

On December 8, 1978, Farmacias El Amal opened a location on the lower floor of the mall.

On May 8, 1980, a Command Performance hair salon opened at the mall.

In December 1981, the mall would be mentioned to have been decorated with a huge Christmas tree that was the delight of children. Placed on a huge trunk, it was decorated with red balls, and beneath it a small winter garden had been created with snow and animals that moved, in different activities. Garlands hung from the rest of the Mall that followed the same decoration of the tree. Individually, the stores had simple decorations, with one or two items, typical of Christmas.

In April 1984, the mall had stores such as Pearle Vision, Stuart's, La Esquina Famosa, Anibal L. Arzuaga (a hardware store), Plaza Sesamo, Waterbed World, Books and Papers, La Favorita, Tiffany's, Gonzalez Padin and many others.

In November 1988, it was reported that precisely 12 years after its inauguration by this point, the mall had continued to expand. On this year the center was expanded some 5,000 square feet. It was also reported that by 1989, expansions would be carried out that would include the remodeling of the main entrance of the mall and the construction of new spaces for new future tenants as told by owner at the time Roberto López.

In December 1988, Plaza del Carmen was mentioned as the largest shopping center in the region and one of the most complete on the entire Island, at the time it was celebrating its 12th anniversary of service to the community of Turabo and adjacent towns. The mall was still going strong with now 48 establishments at the time such as Kress Kids, Sensación, Gaston Bared Jewelers, Fínisima, Paoli Casuals, King's Men Wear, Segarra's Shoes, Kids Way; which had opened that year, Chiquitín; which had been at the mall since 1982, Super Pet Center, Mundo Joven Music Store, Novus, among others. It also at the time housed an Ayer y Hoy restaurant. Another characteristic of the mall was that it had service centers such as a banking institution, the Banco de Ponce, and the Communications Authority, which served the entire community, in addition to having ample parking to further facilitate purchases.

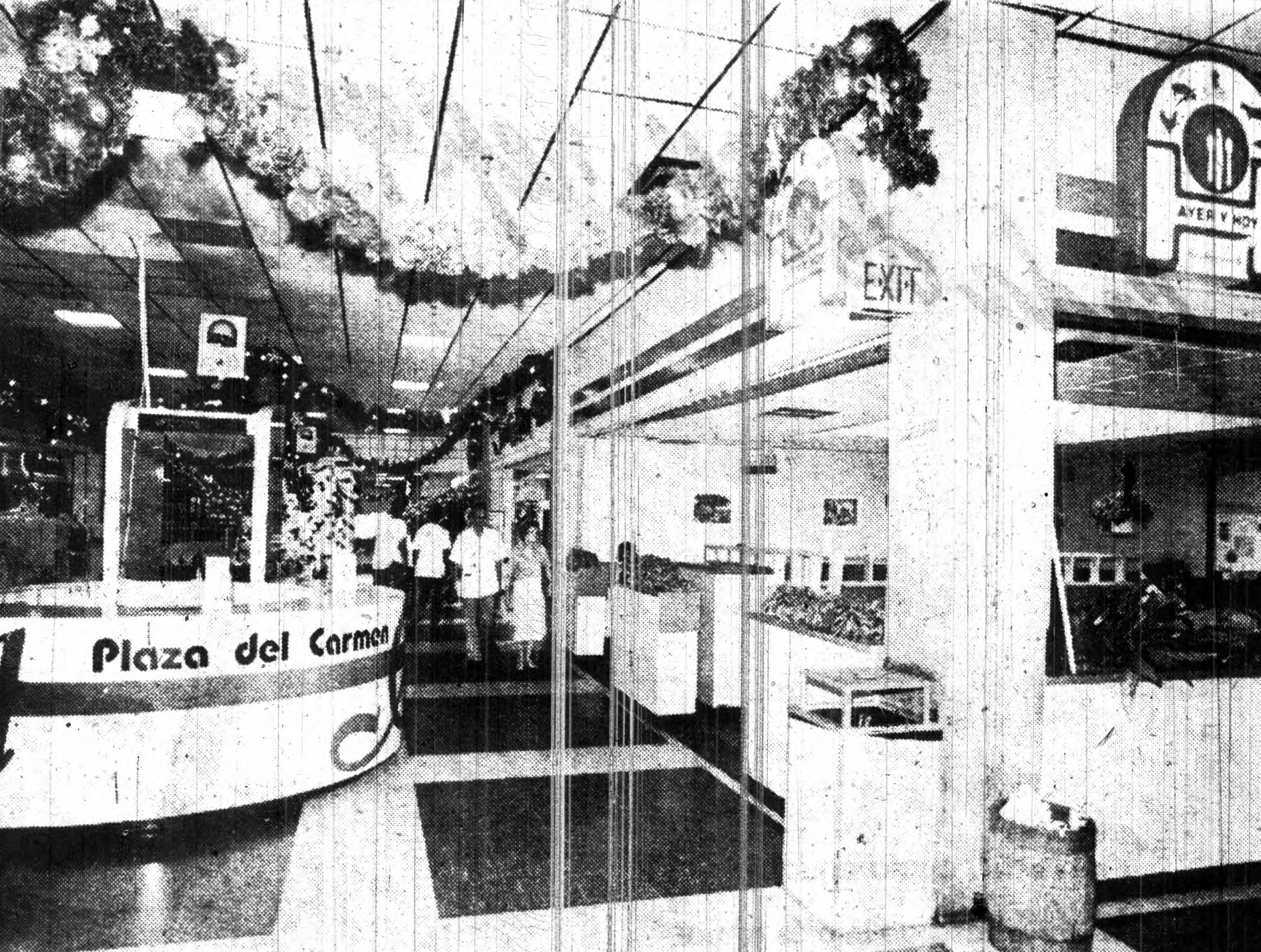
Ayer & Hoy restaurant at the mall in 1988

In 1989, Amigo Supermarkets opened their first major location at the mall, this was in part due to them acquiring CO-OP Supermarkets in 1983 and deciding to shutter the chain in the late 1980s.

In November 1989, it was reported that the Plaza del Carmen Mall, was celebrating its 13th anniversary that year. It was then directed by Roberto López belonging to the commercial and industrial conglomerate of Emérito Estrada Rivera, it had 50 establishments at the time of all kinds with around 350 employees. These establishments included: Rave, Gitty's Toys, Studio Staff, González Padín, Amigo Supermarkets, Novus, Clubman, Arias, Pearle Vision Center, Banco de Ponce and others. The building consisted of two floors with air conditioning, which were connected by escalators and elevators. "It is the only plaza-type shopping center in the eastern center of Puerto Rico. From eight years ago to the present it has grown enormously in terms of sales. We have very good tenants, and we have a waiting list of people who want to rent locals," López explained. Plaza del Carmen Mall was more than just a shopping center, since it contributed greatly to the city of Caguas and adjacent towns in all facets, such as: education, sports (sponsorship of the 1st Youth Tennis Tournament in Caguas) art and music. It also supported the cultural enrichment program and other public efforts. López pointed out that he had integrated the center into the community. "We care about promoting what is here; we open the doors to Puerto Rican artists. In this mall, the best artists in the area have performed, such as Danny Rivera, Lucecita, the Arturo Somohano orchestra, Julio Angel, and Felito Félix, who wrote, directed, and produced the 'jingle' of the Plaza del Carmen Mall radio advertisement, which is currently heard on the radio; and other great artists," López commented. It was as if the town square had moved to the mall. The quality of service at the shopping center had been so excellent that the Puerto Rico Products Association had awarded it the award for Excellence and Quality in the service area. Plaza del Carmen Mall had very reasonable prices since its rent was much lower than other shopping centers in the metropolitan area with the same space which made the mall within the reach, economically, of everyone. One of the advantages that the commercial complex had is that Roberto López, day after day, was working within the same commercial complex, ensuring the good of the merchants and the consumer.

=== 1990s-2000s ===
During the late 1990s, despite the opening of the Amigo Supermarkets store, the mall looked desolate. This was in part due to González Padín ceasing operations in October 1995 and closing their store at the mall, which was followed by other stores over the following years.

On December 27, 2001, it was reported that RadioShack would be opening new stores on the island by 2002. This included a store at the Plaza del Carmen Mall which was scheduled to open by April 2002, Radio Shack stores averaged 2,500 square feet at the time.

By 2004, with the opening of Pitusa in the former González Padín space, and openings of offices, the mall was able to rebound somewhat economically as a mixed-use center.

In July 2005, the mall would welcome the Healthcare Ambulatory Services' (HAS) the first outpatient clinic in the area at the time.

=== 2010s, and on ===
In 2012, the mall had establishments such as RadioShack, Grand Stores, Farmacias Caridad, Payless ShoeSource, Pearle Vision, Me Salvé, Marianne, 5-7-9, La Gloria, Vitanatura, Kids For Less, Sara, Modern Nails, Claró, an Advance Auto Parts, among others. It also had services and offices at the time such as Humana, WIC, MCS, P.D.C.M Medical Group, Health Care Ambulatory, and other doctors offices.

By 2015, the mall was primarily anchored by a Fallas Discount Stores which had by then replaced the former Pitusa space. Pitusa had closed after the consolidation of the chain in 2012.

The Subway restaurant at Plaza del Carmen closed after it was destroyed by Hurricane Maria in September 2017, and reopened in August 2018.

On June 30, 2017, Amigo Supermarkets closed their long-standing location at the mall, its space has since been replaced by a discount store Outlet China.

In late October 2020, Fallas Discount Stores closed at the mall, no plans have been made to replace the anchor space.

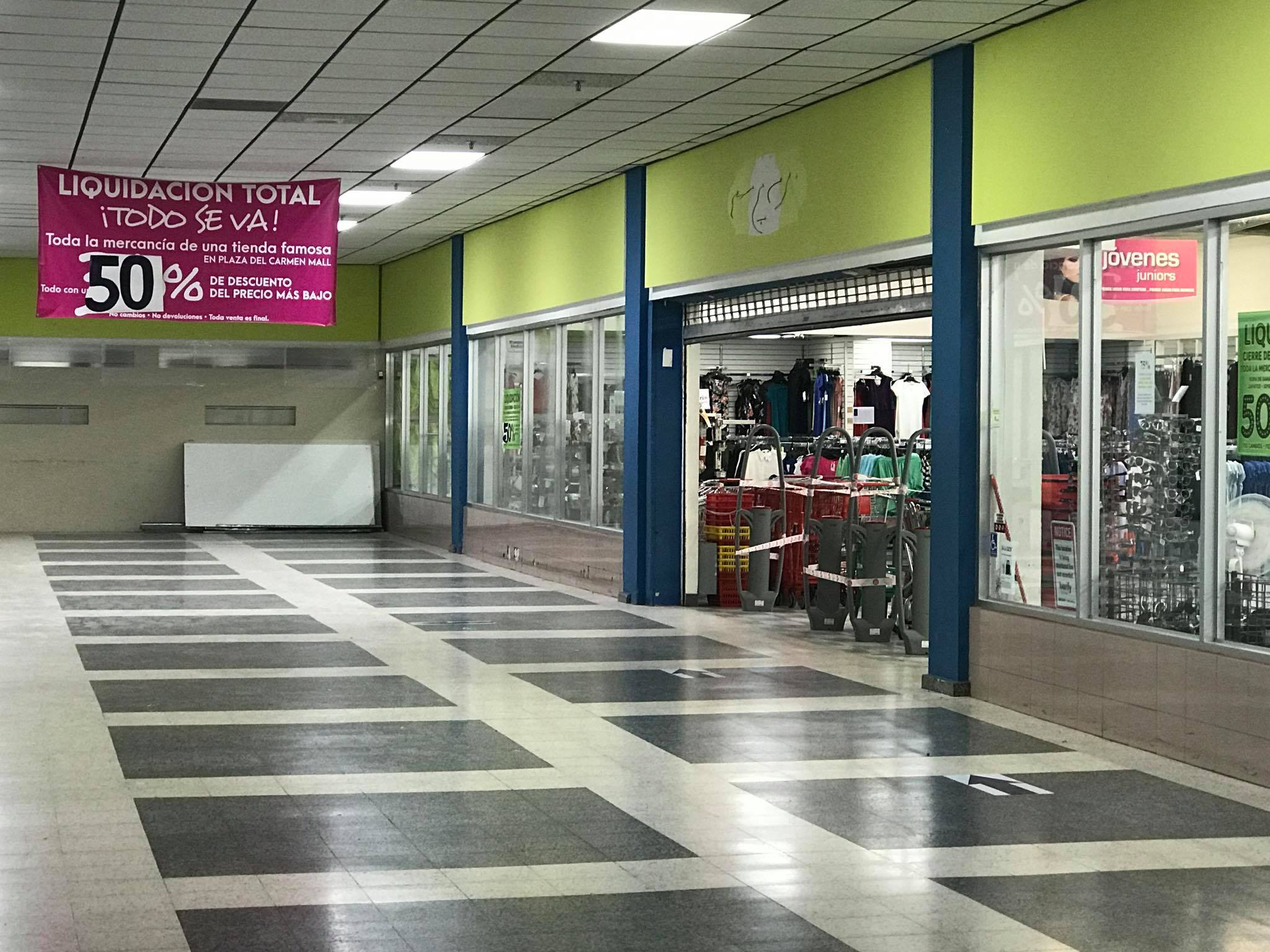
Fallas Discount Stores during liquidation in 2020.

In January 2023, a coffee shop “Café Central” opened at the mall, this included the remodeling of a hallway leading to the coffee shop.

== Current Anchors ==
- Advance Auto Parts
- Farmacias Caridad
- Grand Way
- Outlet China

== Former Anchors ==
- Falas
- Amigo Supermarkets
- Grand Stores
- Pitusa
- González Padín

== Gallery ==
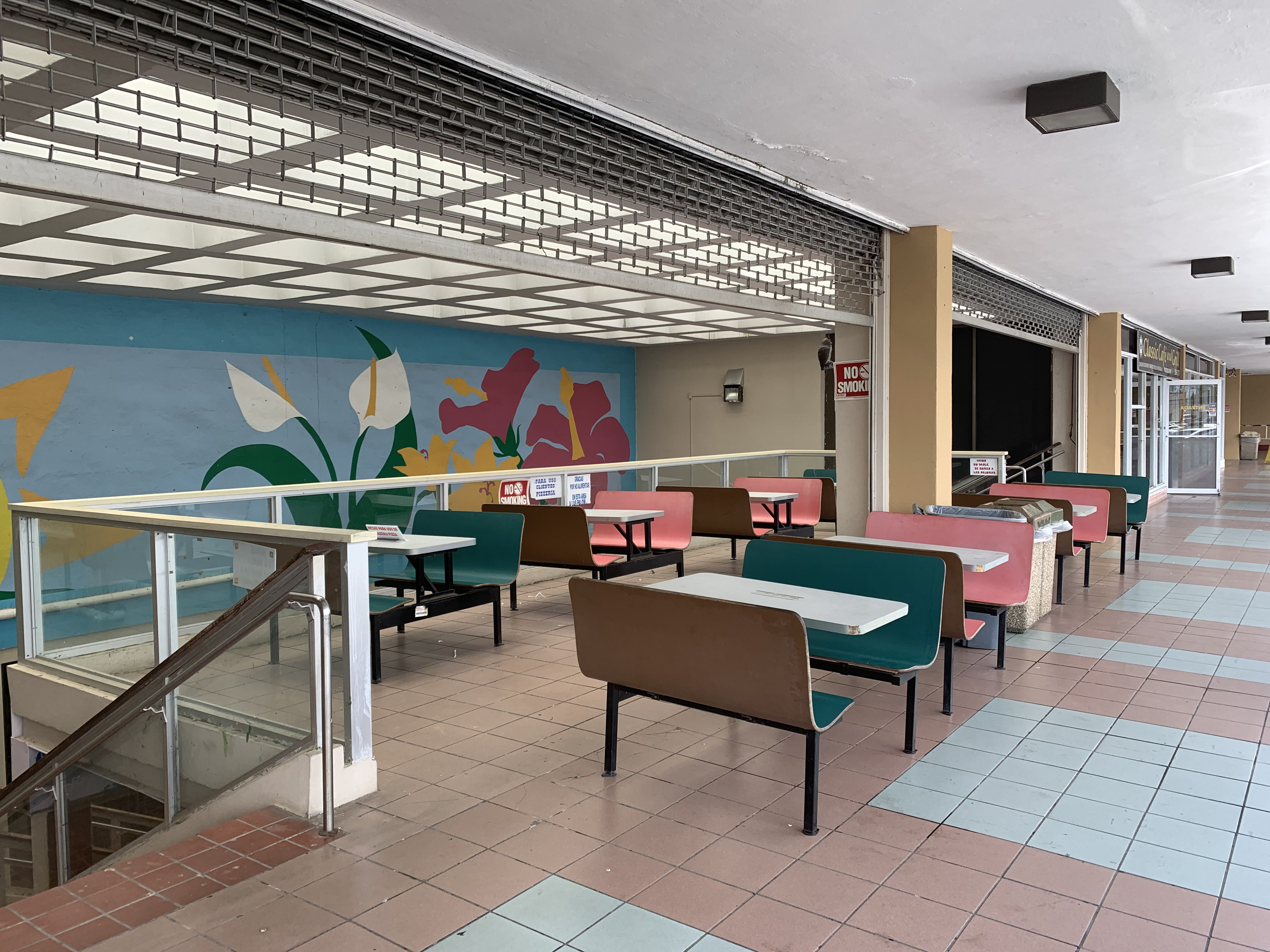
Exterior “food court” area at the mall in 2021.

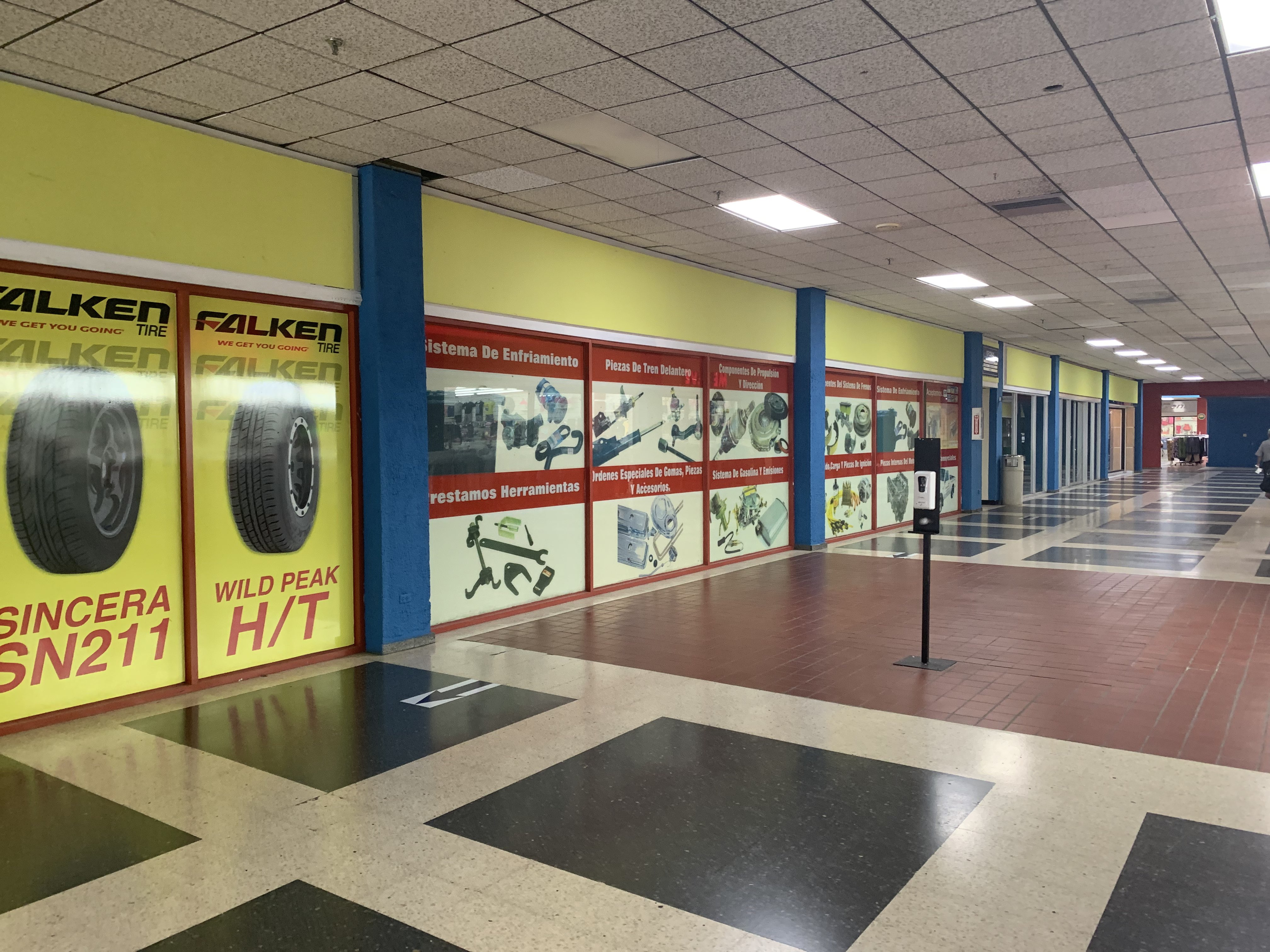
Advance Auto Parts wing looking towards center court at the mall in 2021.

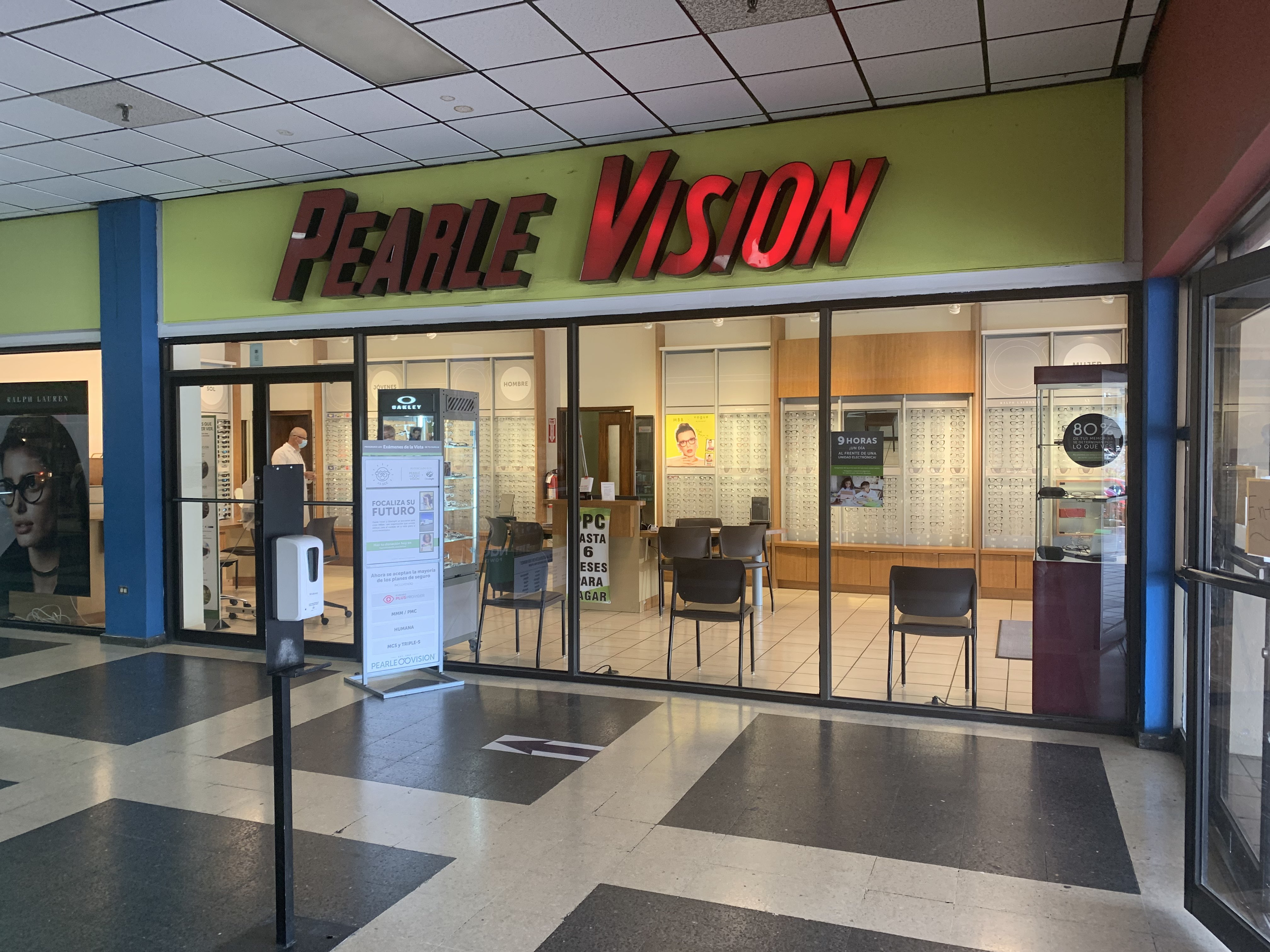
Pearle Vision at the mall in 2021.

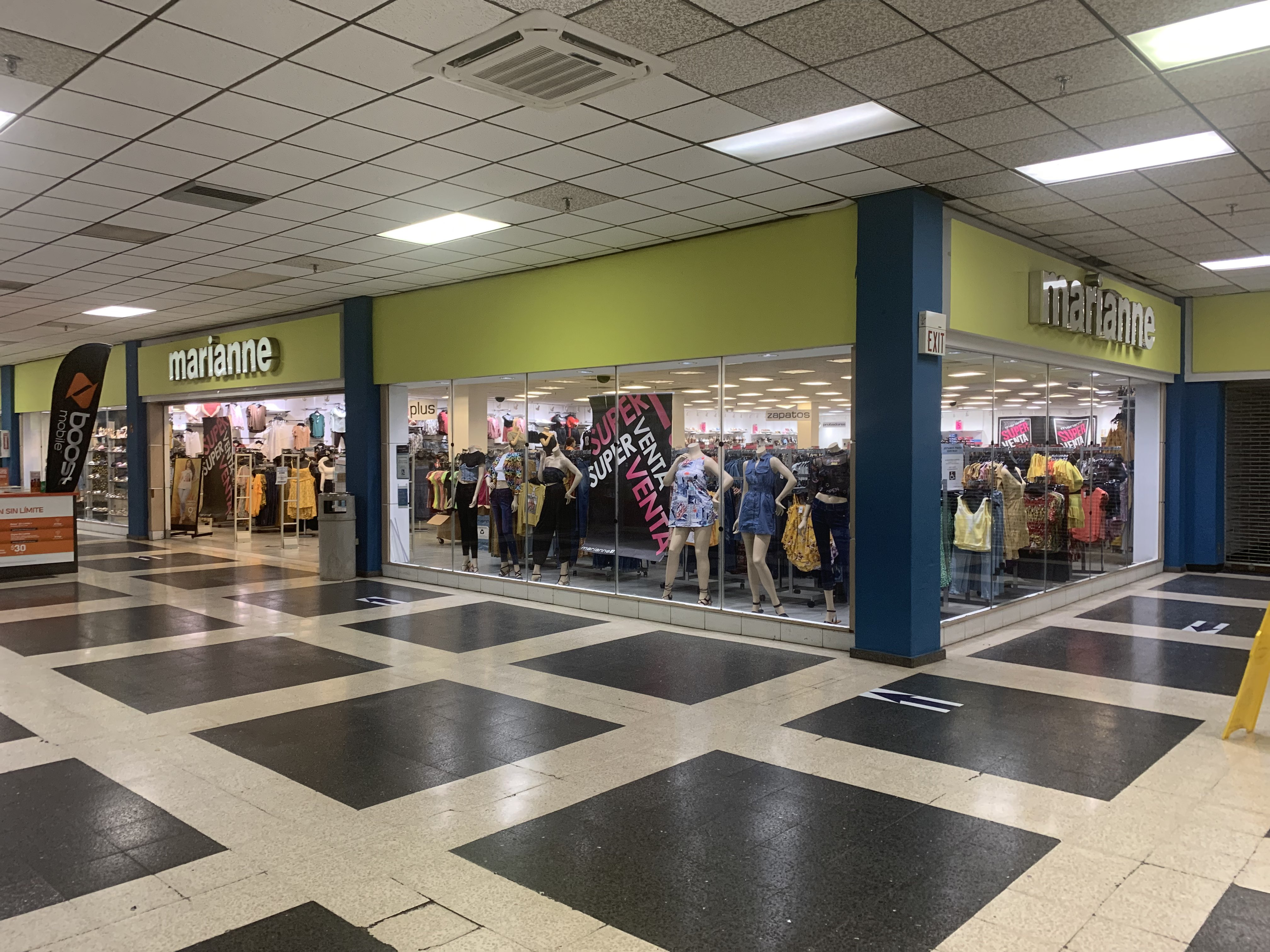
Marianne at the mall in 2021, an original opening day tenant.

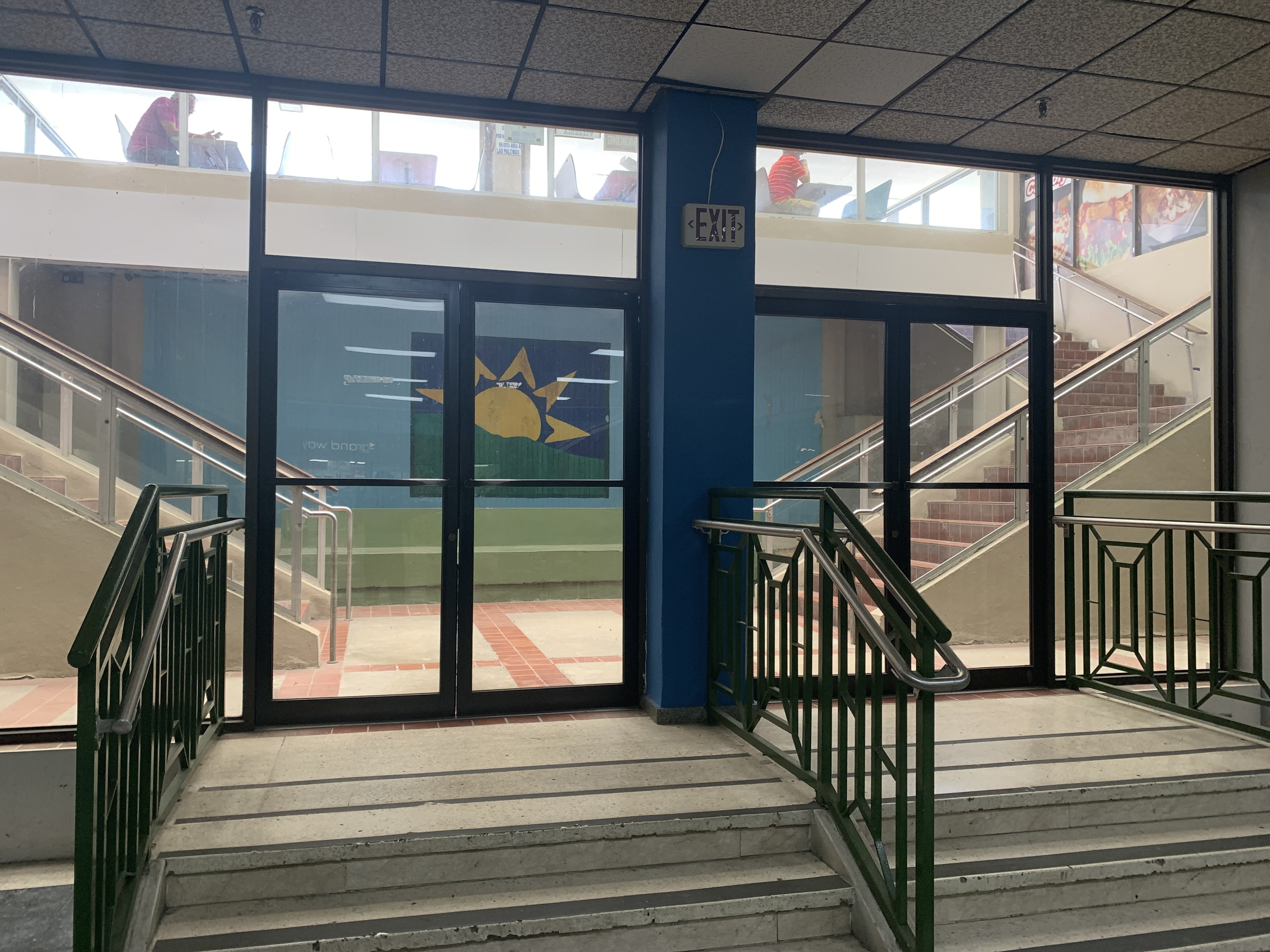
Entrance to exterior fountain, and food court at the mall in 2021.

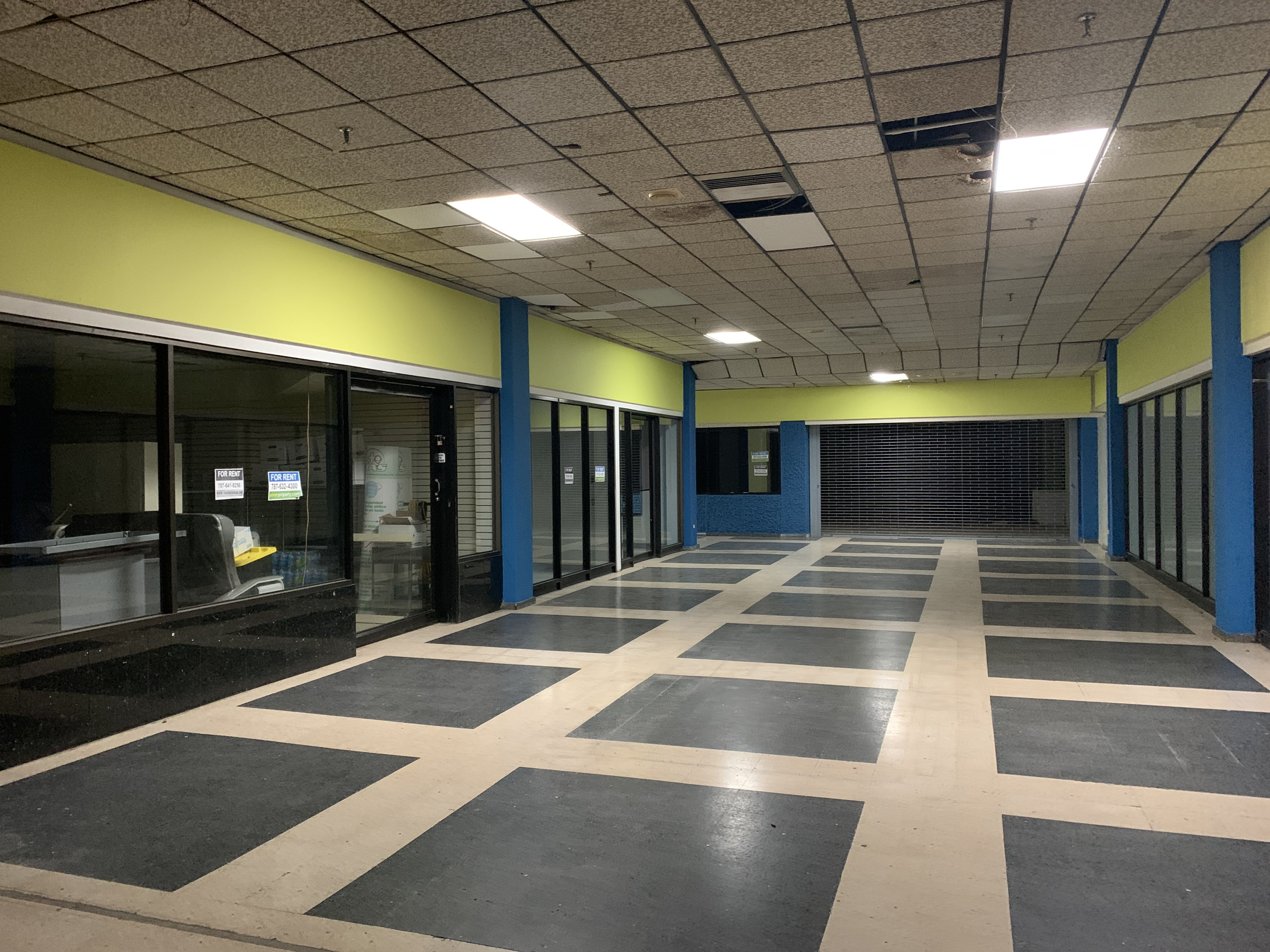
Former Farmacias El Amal wing at the mall in 2021, most vacant area in the mall.
