= Supermercados Econo =

Supermarket chain in Puerto Rico

Supermercados Econo is a Puerto Rican supermarket chain. As of 2021, it had 64 stores in 49 municipalities across the country.

Singer Bad Bunny previously worked at an Econo supermarket.

== History ==
Supermercados Econo started operations in 1970 and its headquarters are in Carolina.

The chain's first store was opened by Facundo Colon, a Puerto Rican businessman, at Hato Rey.

In March 2020 the supermarket chain announced as a result of the COVID-19 pandemic the first hour of operation would be exclusively for elderly customers.

In 2020 the chain celebrated its 50th anniversary by giving out $200,000 in cash prizes.

During 2022, several allegations were made against the supermarket concerning their sales of meat and refrigerated products, including that their Aguadilla location was selling old, rotten meats. The Aguadilla location was temporarily closed.

== In pop culture ==
Supermercados Econo sponsors the television show, "Super Chef Celebrities", on Puerto Rico's WAPA-TV. The show includes celebrities such as Ivan Calderon, Yasmin Mejias and others.

== See also ==
- Supermercados Selectos - another Puerto Rican supermarket chain with similar business model
