= Supermercados Selectos =

Puerto Rican supermarket company

Supermercados Selectos is a Puerto Rican supermarket company. It is one of a number of well-known Puerto Rican supermarkets chains, along with Pueblo Supermarkets and others.

== History ==
The first four Supermercados Selectos stores opened in 1978, after Carlos Torres, a Puerto Rican businessman, took the initiative of organizing a number of small mom-and-pop ("colmado") stores group into one integrated company, in order to compete against larger supermarkets. One of the chain's first owners, Enrique Cortes Rivera, was one of the three original incorporators (Along with Carlos Torres and Ignacio Veloz Camejo) and served as the corporation's first resident agent. He brought to Selectos his experience from being an early member of Supermercados COOP and later went on to a highly condecorated career in Federal Law Enforcement after selling his participation and retiring from the retail and supermarket business. (See certificate of incorporation.) Another one of the chain's first owners was Ignacio Veloz Camejo, honorary president of Centro Unido de Detallistas de Puerto Rico since 1991. In 2018, Supermercados Selectos celebrated its 40 years in business with a large dinner in Caguas.

In 1995, the chain was purchased by Edwin Ortiz.

By 2010, the chain operated a total of 32 stores. By 2014, the chain had reached 37 operating stores. In 2023, it opened, in Vega Alta, what would be its 39th store.

== See also ==
Supermercados Econo - another Puerto Rican supermarket chain with a similar business model
