= COOP (Puerto Rico) =

Puerto Rican supermarket chain

Coop or Supermercados Fam Coop is a Puerto Rican supermarket chain. It has been operating since the 1960s.

== History ==
During the 1970s. Supermercados COOP in Puerto Rico had a similar logo to that used by other COOP supermarkets around the world (two green trees inside a circle). There were locations at key Puerto Rican cities, including one at Santa Juanita, Bayamón, Plaza del Carmen Mall in Caguas, among others.

Subsequent years saw the demise of Grand Union, a chain with a large presence on the Puerto Rican market after being acquired in 1982 by Supermercados Amigo; later on, Supermercados COOP was acquired by Supermercados Amigo in 1983 and the increased competition caused Supermercados Amigo to close Supermercados COOP during the late 1980s. This allowed Supermercados Amigo, a nominally large supermarket chain until then, to expand across the country and rapidly become one of the major players in the Puerto Rican supermarket industry.

== Brand return ==
During 2002, a new kind of supermarkets, named Fam-Coop, started opening across the tiny country. There are a number of them in places such as Bayamon, (Fam-Coop La Milagrosa, opened in 2010) Rincon, San Juan (also named Fam-Coop La Milagrosa-as there are two La Milagrosa neighborhoods in Puerto Rico, one in Bayamon and another in San Juan-and it also opened in 2010) Isabela, Arecibo, (Mi Familia Fam Coop) and other towns.

== See also ==
- Coop (Switzerland)
