= Taco Maker =

Fast food franchise founded in Puerto Rico

- Logo for the Taco Maker Mexican Grill concept launched in 2014.
- Industry: Fast food
- Founded: 1968; 58 years ago
- Founder: Gil L. Craig
- Headquarters: San Juan, Puerto Rico
- Number of locations: 83 (Feb. 2026)
- Areas served: Puerto Rico; Central Florida
- Owner: FransGlobal (2006-present)
- Number of employees: 2,500-3,000 (Feb. 2026)
- Website: TacoMaker.com (Spanish); TacoMakerUSA.com (English)

Taco Maker is an international fast-food Tex-Mex restaurant chain founded in 1968 by Gil L. Craig in Ogden, Utah, and later moved to Puerto Rico. Headquartered in San Juan, Puerto Rico, it operates dozens of locations across Puerto Rico, alongside select mainland U.S. spots in Central Florida (Orlando and Kissimmee) and international branches.

== Locations ==
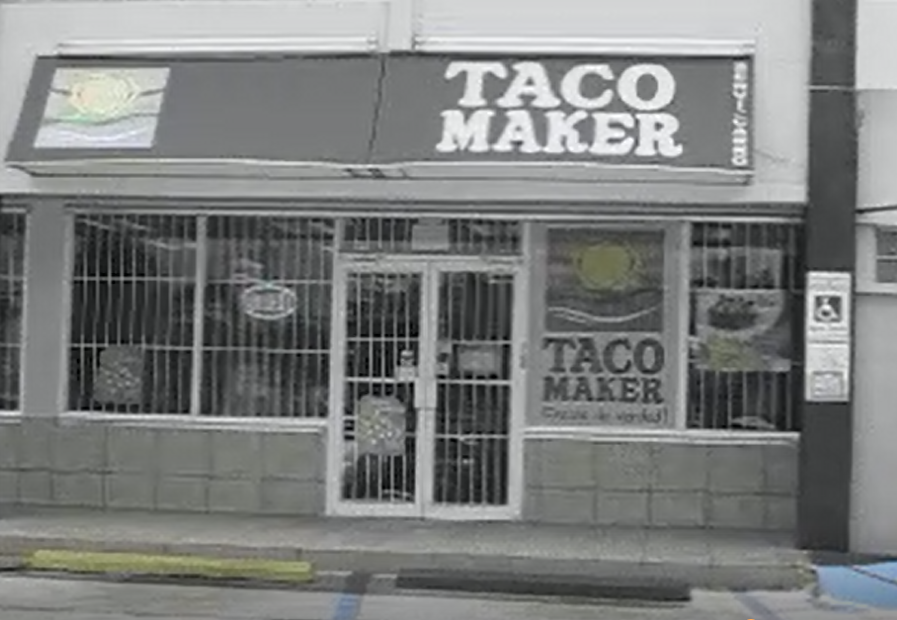
Taco Maker in San Sebastián, Puerto Rico

The majority of the stores are in Puerto Rico with two locations in Florida (in Orlando and Kissimmee) and another in Caracas, Venezuela and, formerly, in St. Thomas, United States Virgin Islands, India, Russia, Dominican Republic, and the Philippines. Taco Maker used to own two franchise locations in the American state of Rhode Island.

== History ==
=== TTM ownership ===
In 1968, Gil L. Craig began his career in Mexican fast food in California, working with his brother. In 1978, as chairman he founded, The Taco Maker, Inc. (TTM). Within the same year, opened the first restaurant in Puerto Rico. A year later, a shop opened in Wayne, N.J., and it remains the oldest operating outlet in the United States but soon closed in 2020. The headquarters was located in Ogden, Utah.

By 1987, there were 100 outlets. The first Jake's Over the Top outlet opened in 1993 in Ogden.

In 1996 and 1997, TTM began franchising two new concepts -- Jake's Over the Top and Mayan Jamma Juice.

=== FranzGlobal ownership ===
Taco Maker logo (until 2016)

A group of Puerto Rican investors known as FransGlobal, bought the Ogden-based Taco Maker fast-food franchise in a multimillion-dollar deal in 2006. FransGlobal also acquired its sister chains Jake's Over the Top and Mayan Jamma Juice.

On July 2008, it was announced the company would move it's headquarters to Central Florida. But as of 2019, its website states its headquarters are in San Juan, Puerto Rico.

Carlos Budet, president of FransGlobal announced a newly introduced modular restaurant concept Taco Maker Mexican Grille on December 12th, 2013. In June 2016, the company announced it would buy more than 50,000 pounds of beef from island farmers, representing a $1.5 million investment.

It was announced Taco Maker would invest $3.3 million in a chainwide restaurant remodeling program in Puerto Rico by 2027, on February 4th 2026.
