= Amigo Supermarkets =

Puerto Rican supermarket chain

- Type: Subsidiary
- Industry: Retail
- Founded: 1920; 106 years ago
- Headquarters: San Juan, Puerto Rico
- Products: Bakery, dairy, deli, frozen foods, general grocery, meat, pharmacy, produce, seafood, snacks, liquor
- Owner: Walmart (2002–2022); Pueblo (2022-present)
- Website: amigo.com

Amigo Supermarkets (Spanish: Supermercados Amigo) is a chain of supermarkets located in Puerto Rico and owned by Pueblo.

== History ==
In the 1920s, Supermercados Amigo was opened by Jose Marti Fuentes. During the company's formative years, it operated small supermarkets across the island; these would be located at small strip malls. Many towns in Puerto Rico had multiple Supermercados Amigo locations.

=== The transformation ===
After the Grand Union and Coop Supermarkets companies ceased operations in Puerto Rico, Amigo began plans to become a major player in Puerto Rico's supermarket industry. In 1989, they opened their first major store, located at Plaza del Carmen Mall, in Caguas. Subsequently, many other major stores were opened across Puerto Rico. A massive television campaign began, and their slogan, Amigo, lo mejor al mejor precio (Amigo, the best at the best prices) became a household phrase in Puerto Rico.

=== Economic problems ===
Amigo ran into serious economic problems in the 1990s, most of them having to do with employee salary. As a consequence, the company began losing money. There were several strikes, and these received wide media attention.

=== Walmart acquisition ===
In July 2002, American retail giant Walmart purchased Supermercados Amigo, in what became a controversial business move. Claims of unfair competition and monopoly were instantly made by smaller supermarkets, because Amigo would be backed by the strong assets of Walmart. As part of the agreement made in order for the purchase to take place, various supermarket locations had to be closed (specifically if there was a Walmart or Sam's Club nearby). The closed Amigos became part of a new (at the time) supermarkets company known as "SuperMax" and "Pitusa Markets".

The structure of the supermarkets themselves was not changed because of the purchase, the only exception being that now customers may pay for their purchases with their respective Sam's Club or Walmart Credit Cards.

In January 2016, Walmart announced it would close four Amigo stores (plus all three Super Ahorros stores) located throughout the island, as part of a larger wave of store closures.

=== 2019 renovations ===
On November 5, 2019, Amigo Supermarkets announced a renovation plan on its stores nationwide that would cost $7.8 million US dollars.

=== Supermercados Pueblo acquisition ===
In July 2022, Walmart announced that it would sell the Amigo chain to Pueblo.

In June 2022, the closing of the last Amigo supermarket by Walmart was announced, this was located in Dorado and the sale of the remaining 11 Amigo Supermarkets to Pueblo Supermarkets was announced, the brand name would remain and the 1,100 employees would keep their jobs. On August 26, 2022, the Amigo supermarkets closed their doors at 6pm to begin the transition of Matrix companies from Walmart to Pueblo, the reopening of Amigo scheduled for September 1.

As of December 2023, when one Amigo supermarket at Las Catalinas Mall in Caguas was affected by a minor fire, Amigo supermarkets remained open.
