= List of companies of Puerto Rico =

Location of Puerto Rico

Puerto Rico is an unincorporated territory of the United States located in the northeast Caribbean Sea. It is an archipelago that includes the main island of Puerto Rico and a number of smaller ones such as Mona, Culebra, and Vieques. The capital and most populous city is San Juan. Its official languages are Spanish and English, though Spanish predominates. The commonwealth's population is approximately 3.2 million.

== Notable firms ==
This list includes notable companies with primary headquarters located in the country. The industry and sector follow the Industry Classification Benchmark taxonomy. Organizations which have ceased operations are included and noted as defunct.

Notable companies Status: P=Private, S=State; A=Active, D=Defunct
Name	Industry	Sector	Headquarters	Founded	Notes	Status	
Air Flamenco	Consumer services	Airlines	Culebra	1976	Commuter airline	P	A
Amigo Supermarkets	Consumer services	Food retailers & wholesalers	San Juan	1989	Food retailer, part of Pueblo Supermarkets (PR)	P	A
Authority for the Financing of the Infrastructure of Puerto Rico	Financials	Real estate holding & development	San Juan	1988	Infrastructure development	S	A
Banco Crédito y Ahorro Ponceño	Financials	Banks	Ponce	1895	Bank, defunct 1978	P	D
Banco de Ponce	Financials	Banks	Ponce	1990	Bank, defunct 1990	P	D
Bolera Caribe	Consumer services	Recreational services	Ponce	2004	Bowling alley	P	A
Borinquen Air	Consumer services	Airlines	San Juan	1961	Charter airline	P	A
Café Rico	Consumer goods	Food products	Ponce	1930	Coffee producer	P	A
Caribair	Consumer services	Airlines	San Juan	1973	Airline, defunct 1973	P	D
Caribbean Cinemas	Consumer services	Recreational services	San Juan	1986	Movie theater chain	P	A
Caribbean Petroleum Corporation	Oil & gas	Exploration & production	Bayamón	1987	Refinery, defunct 2009	P	D
Caribe.Net	Telecommunications	Fixed line telecommunications	San Juan	1994	Telecom, ISP	P	A
Casiano Communications	Consumer services	Publishing	San Juan	1973	Business weekly Caribbean Business, magazines, business guides	P	A
Castillo Serrallés	Consumer services	Recreational services	Ponce	1990	Rum museum	P	A
Centro del Sur Mall	Consumer goods	Broadline retailers	Ponce	1962	Shopping mall	P	A
Chocolate Cortés	Consumer goods	Chocolatier	San Juan	1929	Chocolate Manufacturer	P	A
Claridad	Consumer services	Publishing	San Juan	1959	Newspaper	P	A
Claro Puerto Rico	Telecommunications	Fixed line telecommunications	Guaynabo	2006	Telephone, IPTV, wireless, part of América Móvil (Mexico)	P	A
Commonwealth Oil Refining Company	Oil & gas	Exploration & production	Peñuelas	1954	Refining, defunct 1982	P	D
Compañía Cervecera de Puerto Rico	Consumer goods	Brewers	Mayagüez	1937	Beer and malta manufacturer	P	A
Cristalia Premium Water	Consumer goods	Beverages	Ponce	1986	Bottled water	P	A
Culebra Air Services	Consumer services	Airlines	Culebra	1998	Airline	P	A
Deportes Salvador Colom	Consumer services	Specialty retailers	Guaynabo	1951	Sporting goods stores	P	A
Destilería Serrallés	Consumer goods	Distillers & vintners	Ponce	1865	Spirits manufacturer	P	A
Dorado Wings	Consumer services	Airlines	San Juan	1964	Airline, defunct 1982	P	D
Doral Financial Corporation	Financials	Banks	San Juan	1972	Bank, defunct 2015	P	D
EcoEléctrica	Utilities	Gas distribution	Peñuelas	2000	LNG	P	A
El Imparcial	Consumer services	Publishing	San Juan	1918	Newspaper, now online news	P	A
El Meson Sandwiches	Consumer services	Restaurants & bars	Mayagüez	1972	Fast-casual restaurant chain	P	A
El Mundo	Consumer services	Publishing	San Juan	1919	Newspaper, defunct 1986	P	D
El Nuevo Día	Consumer services	Publishing	Guaynabo	1909	Newspaper	P	A
El Ponceño	Consumer services	Publishing	Ponce	1852	Newspaper, defunct 1854	P	D
El Vocero	Consumer services	Publishing	San Juan	1974	Newspaper	P	A
EuroBancshares	Financials	Banks	San Juan	1979	Bank, defunct 2010	P	D
Executive Airlines	Consumer services	Airlines	Carolina	1986	Airline, defunct 2013	P	D
Farmacias El Amal	Consumer services	Drug retailers	San Juan	1973	Retail pharma, defunct 2011	P	D
Fina Air	Consumer services	Airlines	San Juan	2003	Airline, defunct	P	D
First BanCorp	Financials	Banks	San Juan	1948	Bank	P	A
Fox Delicias Mall	Consumer services	Hotels	Ponce	1991	Bed and breakfast, defunct 2004	P	D
Hospital Damas	Health care	Health care providers	Ponce	1863	Hospital	P	A
Hospital Episcopal San Lucas	Health care	Health care providers	Ponce	1907	Hospital	P	A
Hospital Metropolitano Dr. Pila	Health care	Health care providers	Ponce	1925	Hospital	P	A
Hospital Oncológico Andrés Grillasca	Health care	Health care providers	Ponce	1946	Hospital	P	A
Hospital Tricoche	Health care	Health care providers	Ponce	1885	Hospital, defunct 1999	P	D
Hotel Fox Delicias	Consumer services	Hotels	Ponce	2004	Bed and breakfast, defunct 2010	P	D
Hotel Meliá	Consumer services	Hotels	Ponce	1895	Bed and breakfast	P	A
Hotel Ponce Intercontinental	Consumer services	Hotels	Ponce	1960	Luxury hotel, defunct 1975	P	D
Industrias Vassallo	Industrials	Industrial suppliers	Ponce	1962	PVC manufacturer	P	A
La Democracia	Consumer services	Publishing	Ponce	1890	Newspaper, defunct 1948	P	D
La Estrella Norte	Consumer services	Publishing	Mayagüez	1983	Newspaper	P	A
La Estrella Oeste	Consumer services	Publishing	Mayagüez	1983	Newspaper	P	A
La Perla del Sur	Consumer services	Publishing	Ponce	1982	Newspaper	P	A
Lares Ice Cream Parlor	Consumer services	Restaurants & bars	Lares	1968	Restaurant	P	A
Liberty Puerto Rico	Telecommunications	Fixed line telecommunications	San Juan	1999	Telephone, IPTV, wireless,	P	A
Los Chinos de Ponce	Consumer services	Restaurants & bars	Ponce	1964	Restaurant	P	A
Martex Farms	Consumer goods	Farming & fishing	Santa Isabel	1989	Agribusiness	P	A
Martin's BBQ	Consumer services	Restaurants & bars	?	?	BBQ chain	P	A
Mercado de las Carnes	Consumer goods	Food retailers & wholesalers	Ponce	1826	Meat market	P	A
Merlin Express	Industrials	Delivery services	Aguadilla	1983	Cargo airline	P	A
Museo de Arte de Ponce	Consumer services	Recreational services	Ponce	1965	Art museum	P	A
MyLogIQ	Financials	Finance and credit services	San Juan	2001	Financial data company	P	A
National Ballet Theater of Puerto Rico	Consumer services	Recreational services	Guaynabo	2004	Ballet company	P	A
Oceanair	Consumer services	Airlines	Carolina	1979	Airline, defunct 1984	P	D
OneLink Communications	Telecommunications	Fixed line telecommunications	San Juan	2005	Broadband, defunct 2013	P	D
Open Mobile	Telecommunications	Mobile telecommunications	Guaynabo	2007	Telephone, wireless, defunct 2019	P	D
Oriental Financial Group	Financials	Banks	San Juan	1964	Bank	P	A
Plaza del Caribe	Consumer goods	Broadline retailers	Ponce	1992	Shopping mall	P	A
Plaza del Mercado de Ponce	Consumer goods	Food retailers & wholesalers	Ponce	1865	Food market	P	A
Ponce Candy Industries	Consumer goods	Food products	Ponce	1940	Confectionery	P	A
Ponce Cement	Industrials	Building materials & fixtures	Ponce	1941	Cement	P	A
Ponce Health Sciences University	Education	Higher education	Ponce	1977	University	P	A
Ponce Plaza Hotel & Casino	Consumer services	Hotels	Ponce	2009	Luxury hotel	P	A
Ponce Salt Industries	Consumer goods	Food products	Ponce	1963	Foods	P	A
Pontifical Catholic University of Puerto Rico	Education	Higher education	Ponce	1948	University	P	A
Popular, Inc.	Financials	Banks	San Juan	1893	Bank	P	A
Primera Hora	Consumer services	Publishing	Guaynabo	1997	Newspaper	P	A
Prinair	Consumer services	Airlines	Ponce	1966	Airline, defunct 1985, restarted during 2019	P	A
Pro-Air Services	Consumer services	Airlines	San Juan	1981	Charter airline	P	A
Pueblo Supermarkets	Consumer services	Food retailers & wholesalers	San Juan	1955	Food retailer	P	A
Puerto Rican Pottery	Consumer goods	Durable household products	Santurce	1948	Pottery, defunct 1966	P	D
Puerto Rico Aqueducts and Sewers Authority	Utilities	Water	San Juan	1945	State water	S	A
Puerto Rico Daily Sun	Consumer services	Publishing	San Juan	2008	Newspaper	P	A
Puerto Rico Electric Power Authority	Utilities	Conventional electricity	San Juan	1941	State electrical	S	A
Puerto Rico Iron Works	Basic materials	Basic resources	Ponce	1919	Iron foundry	P	A
Puertorriqueña de Aviación	Consumer services	Airlines	San Juan	1936	Airline, defunct 1941	P	D
R & G Financial Corporation	Financials	Banks	San Juan	1966	Bank, defunct 2010	P	D
Roblex Aviation	Consumer services	Airlines	San Juan	1997	Airline, defunct 2011	P	D
Rovira Biscuits Corporation	Consumer goods	Food products	Ponce	1929	Crackers	P	A
Supermercados Econo	Consumer services	Food retailers & wholesalers	Carolina	1970	Food retailer	P	A
Supermercados Selectos	Consumer services	Food retailers & wholesalers	Dorado	1978	Food retailer	P	A
Teatro Fox Delicias	Consumer services	Recreational services	Ponce	1931	Movie theater, defunct 1980	P	D
Telemundo Internacional	Consumer services	Broadcasting & entertainment	San Juan	1994	Television channel	P	A
The San Juan Star	Consumer services	Publishing	San Juan	1959	Newspaper	P	A
Tol Air	Industrials	Delivery services	San Juan	1981	Cargo airline, defunct 2006	P	D
Topeka	Consumer services	Broadline retailers	San Juan	1967	Store chain, now defunct	P	A
Triple-S Management Corporation	Financials	Full line insurance	San Juan	1959	Insurance holding	P	A
ULTRACOM	Telecommunications	Fixed line telecommunications	?	1992	Satellite and submarine cables	P	A
V. Suarez & Co.	Consumer goods	Food products	Bayamón	1943	Food and development	P	A
Vea	Consumer services	Publishing	San Juan	1968	Magazine, defunct 2009	P	D
Vieques Air Link	Consumer services	Airlines	Vieques	1965	Airline	P	A
W Holding Company	Financials	Banks	Mayagüez	1958	Financial holding, defunct 2010	P	D
WAPA	Consumer services	Broadcasting & entertainment	Ponce	1953	Radio station	P	A
WAPA-TV	Consumer services	Broadcasting & entertainment	San Juan	1954	Television channel	P	A
WIOC	Consumer services	Broadcasting & entertainment	Ponce	1965	Radio station	P	A
WKAQ-TV	Consumer services	Broadcasting & entertainment	San Juan	1954	Television channel	P	A
WLEO	Consumer services	Broadcasting & entertainment	Ponce	1956	Radio station	P	A
WLII-DT	Consumer services	Broadcasting & entertainment	Caguas	1986	Television channel	P	A
WPAB	Consumer services	Broadcasting & entertainment	Ponce	1940	Radio station	P	A
WPRP	Consumer services	Broadcasting & entertainment	Ponce	1936	Radio station	P	A
WPUC-FM	Consumer services	Broadcasting & entertainment	Ponce	1958	Radio station	P	A
WSTE-DT	Consumer services	Broadcasting & entertainment	Ponce	1958	Television channel	P	A
WorldNet Telecommunications	Telecommunications	Fixed line telecommunications	Guaynabo	1996	Telecom	P	A
WZBS	Consumer services	Broadcasting & entertainment	Ponce	1963	Radio station	P	A
WZMT	Consumer services	Broadcasting & entertainment	Ponce	1969	Radio station	P	A

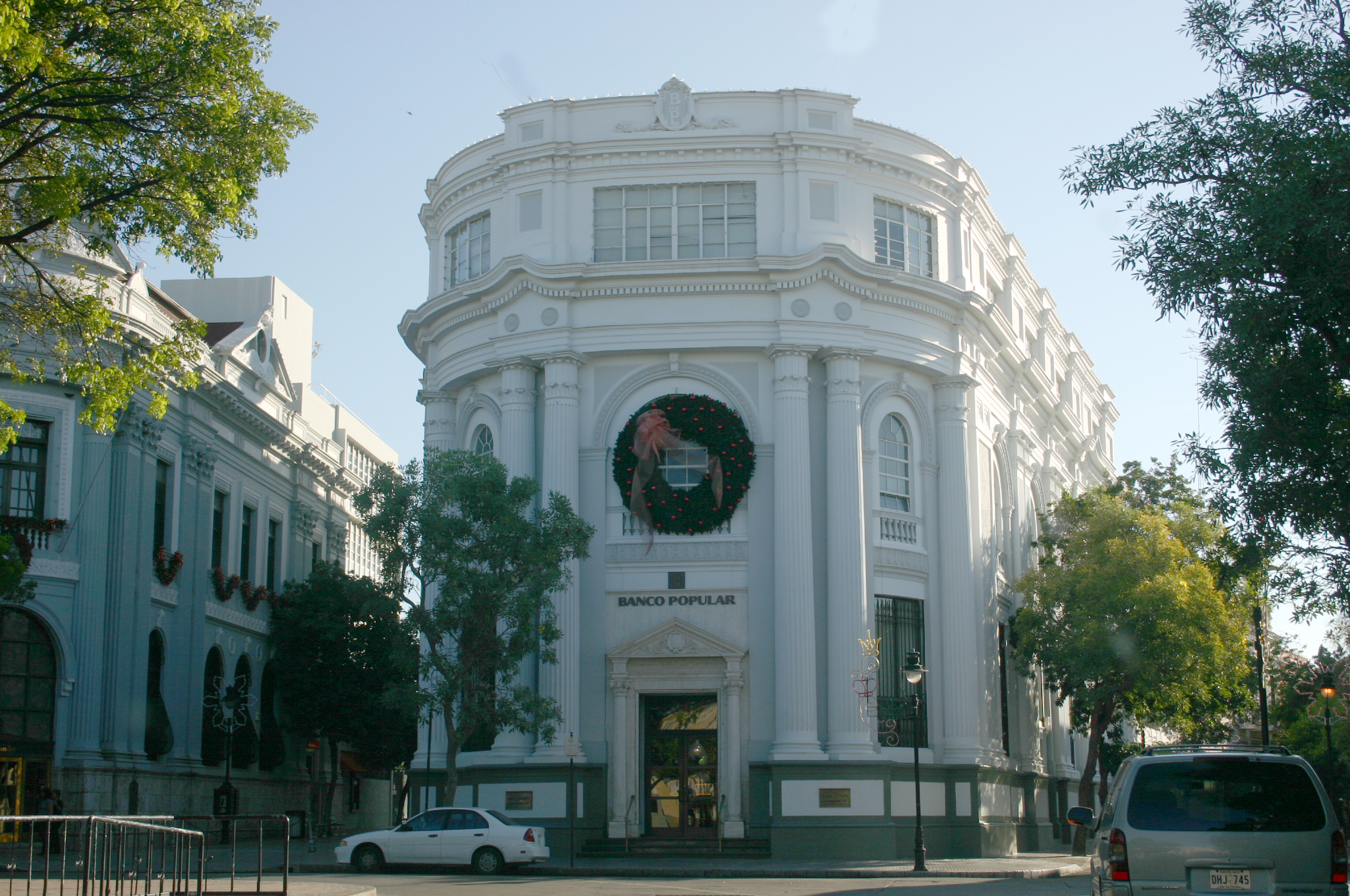
Banco de Ponce network branch in Puerto Rico

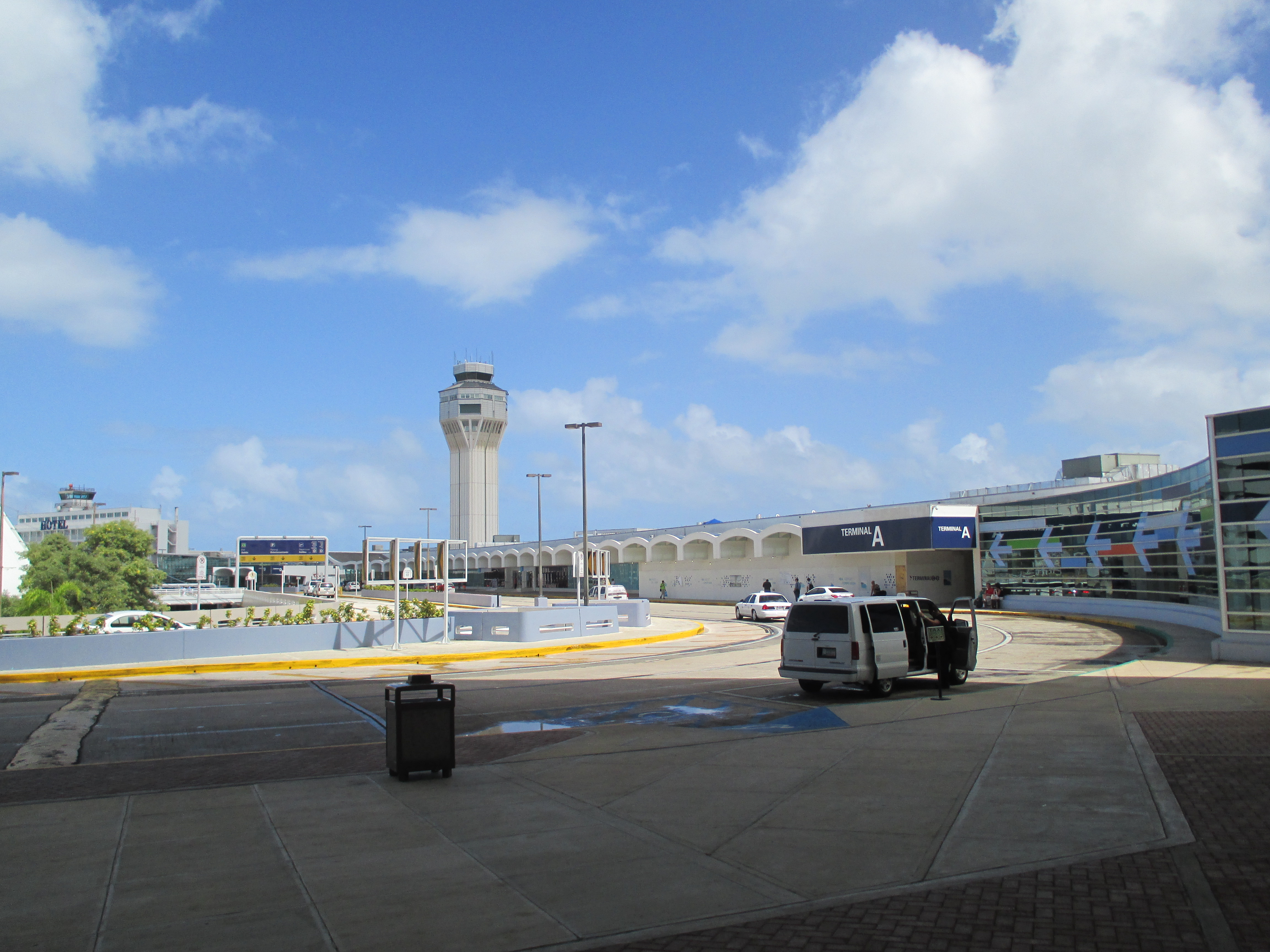
Luis Muñoz Marín International Airport in San Juan, Puerto Rico

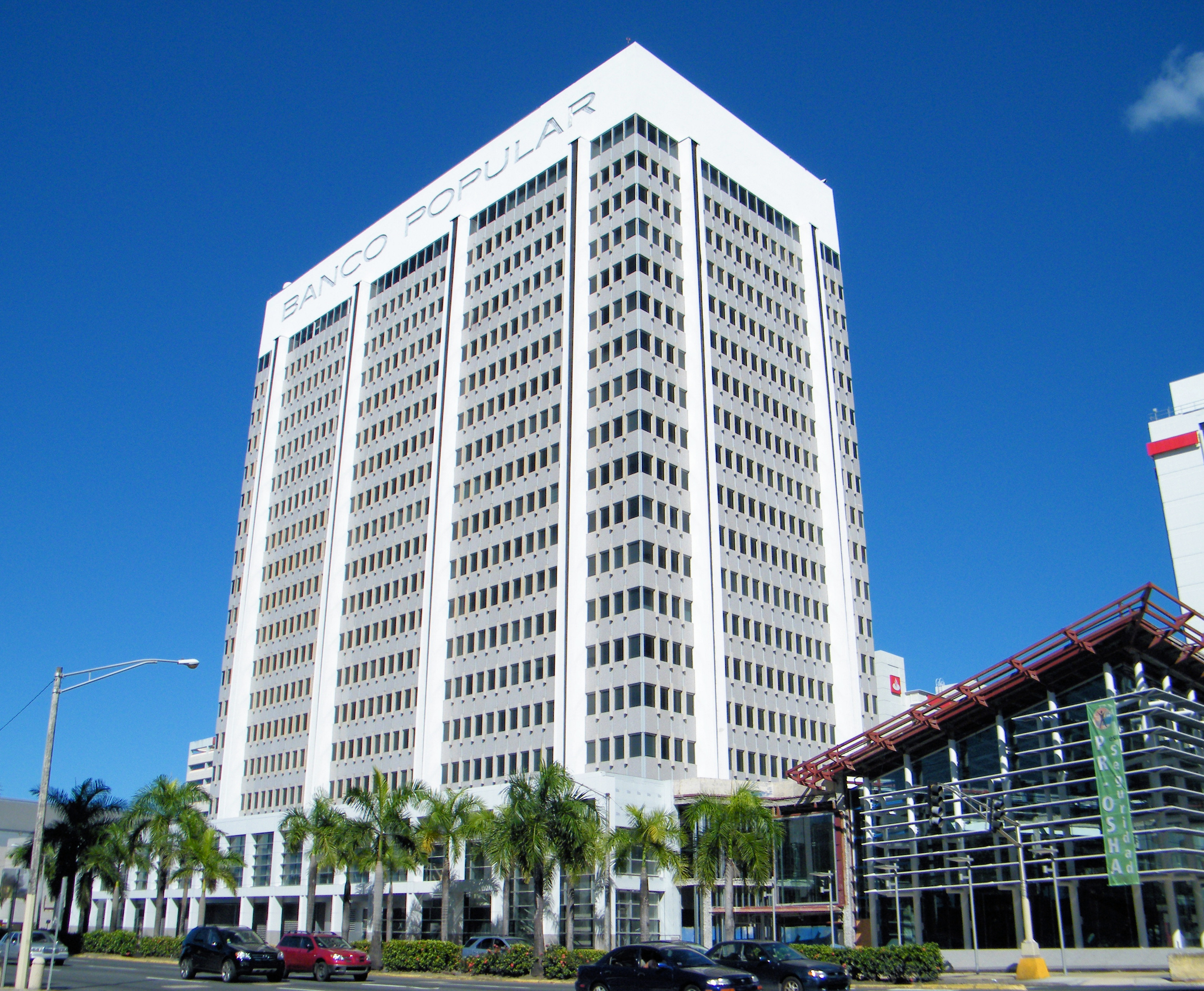
Popular, Inc. headquarters in the Golden Mile of Hato Rey

== See also ==
- List of government-owned corporations of Puerto Rico
- List of hotels in Puerto Rico
- List of newspapers in Puerto Rico
