= Suarez (disambiguation) =

Suárez is a common Spanish surname. Suarez may also refer to:

== Locations ==
- Diego-Suarez, former name of Antsiranana, a city in Madagascar
  - Diego-Suarez Bay, former name of Antsiranana Bay
  - Archdiocese of Diego-Suarez, former name of Roman Catholic Archdiocese of Antsiranana
  - Postage stamps and postal history of Diego-Suárez
- Coronel Suárez, a town in the south of the province of Buenos Aires, Argentina
  - Coronel Suárez Partido, subdivision of the province of Buenos Aires, Argentina
- El Porvenir de Velasco Suárez, Chiapas, Mexico
- Estadio Jorge Calero Suárez, multi-use stadium in El Salvador
- González Suárez, electoral parish in Quito, Ecuador
- Isla Suárez, island disputed by Brazil and Bolivia
- Laguna Suárez, lake in Bolivia
- Liceo Joaquin Suarez (Montevideo), school in Montevideo, Uruguay
- Metro Pino Suárez, metro station in Mexico City
- Nicolás Suárez Province, in Bolivia
- Puerto Suárez, inland river port in Bolivia
  - Puerto Suárez International Airport
- Residencia de Suárez, official residence of the President of Uruguay
- Suárez, Colombia (disambiguation)
  - Suárez, Cauca, a municipality in the Cauca Department of Colombia
  - Suárez, Tolima, a municipality in the Tolima Department of Colombia
- Suarez, Iligan City, Philippines
- Tenosique de Pino Suárez, town in Tabasco, Mexico
- Tristán Suárez, town in Buenos Aires Province, Argentina
  - Club Social y Deportivo Tristán Suárez, football club

== Music ==
- Suarez (band), Belgian band with Italo-Spanish origins
- Suárez (band), Argentine indie rock band

== Other uses ==
- 6438 Suárez, a main-belt asteroid
- Duke of Suárez, Spanish title of nobility
- V. Suarez & Co., Puerto Rican consumer products distributor
