= Margaret Fishback =

American poet

Margaret Fishback

Margaret Fishback, later Margaret Fishback Antolini (March 10, 1900 – September 25, 1985), was an American poet and prose author from the late 1920s until the 1960s. During the 1930s, she was reputed to be the highest-paid female advertising copywriter in the world.

== Biography ==
Born in Washington, D.C., she earned a degree from Goucher College before joining Macy's as a divisional advertising copywriter in 1926. During the 1930s, she was reputed to be the world's highest-paid female advertising copywriter. She was published in The New Yorker, the New York Herald Tribune, and several well-known women's magazines. According to a large collection of her papers held by Duke's Hartman Center for Sales, Advertising, and Marketing History, "Fishback contributed to advertising campaigns for Arrow Shirts, Borden's, Chef Boy-Ar-Dee, Clairol, DuPont, Gimbels, Great Atlantic & Pacific Tea Company (A&P), Hanes Hosiery, Martex, Norsk, Pabst Blue Ribbon, Seagram's, Simmons Beautyrest, and Wrigley, among several others."

Fishback died in Camden, Maine, at the age of 85. Fishback was married to Alberto Gastone Antolini, the chief rug buyer for Macy's, from 1935 to 1956. They had one son, Anthony Antolini.

== Books ==
An extensive selection of Fishback's poetry first published in periodicals later appeared in book form. Among these collections were the following:

- I Feel Better Now, New York: E.P. Dutton & Co., Inc., 1932 (poems originally appearing in the New York World, The New Yorker, Life, The Saturday Evening Post, The New York American, Judge, and Vanity Fair)
- I Take It Back, New York: E.P. Dutton & Co., Inc., 1935 (poems originally appearing in The New Yorker, The Saturday Evening Post, Harper's Bazaar, Life, Ladies' Home Journal, The New York American, The New York Sun, The World, Judge, Vanity Fair, Redbook, Buffalo Town Tidings, The Stage, and The Forum Magazine)
- Poems Made Up to Take Out, New York: David McKay Co., Inc., 1963 (poems originally appearing in Better Living, Collier's, Glamour, Good Housekeeping, Ladies' Home Journal, the New York Herald Tribune, Pictorial Review, Reader's Digest, American Girl, American Home, The New York Times, The Saturday Evening Post, The Wall Street Journal, This Week, Woman's Day, and Women's Wear Daily)
- One to a Customer, New York: E.P. Dutton & Co., 1937 (an omnibus comprising I Feel Better Now and Poems Made Up to Take Out, supra, together with two other volumes: Out of My Head and I Take It Back)
- Time for a Quick One, New York, Harcourt, Brace and Company, 1940. Poems originally appearing in various American magazines.

Fishback also wrote some books for children and collaborated with artist Hilary Knight to produce A Child's Book of Natural History (USA: Platt & Monk, 1969), a revision and extension of A Child's Primer of Natural History by Oliver Herford. She wrote a book of etiquette, Safe Conduct: When to Behave—And Why, and a humorous guide to parenthood under the title Look Who's a Mother! A Book About Babies for Parents, Expectant and Otherwise.

== In popular culture ==
- Lillian Boxfish Takes a Walk, by Kathleen Rooney, loosely based on the life of Margaret Fishback, was released by St. Martin's Press in 2017.
