= Kathleen Rooney =

American novelist, poet, essayist

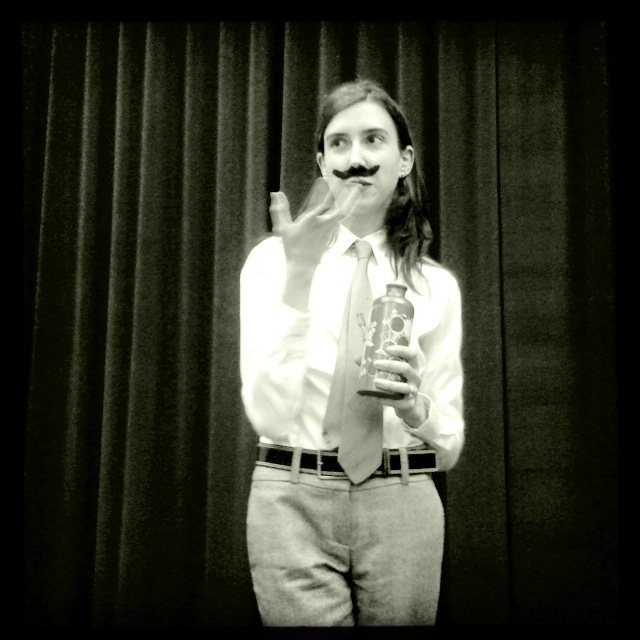
- Kathleen Rooney as Weldon Kees, discussing Robinson Alone, DePaul University, 10-12-2012
- Born: Beckley, West Virginia, U.S.
- Education: George Washington University (BA); Emerson College (MFA)
- Occupations: Writer; publisher; editor; professor
- Spouse: Martin Seay
- Writing career
- Genres: Novelist, poet, essayist

Kathleen Rooney is an American writer, publisher, editor, and educator.

== Early life and education ==
Kathleen Rooney was born in Beckley, West Virginia and raised in the Midwest. She earned a B.A. from the George Washington University and an M.F.A. in Writing, Literature, and Publishing from Emerson College. While at Emerson, she was awarded a 2003 Ruth Lilly Fellowship from Poetry Magazine.

== Career ==
Rooney's first book, Reading with Oprah: the Book Club That Changed America, an in-depth analysis of the cultural and literary impacts of Oprah's Book Club, was published by University of Arkansas Press in 2005 and reissued in 2008. Her first poetry collection, Oneiromance (an epithalamion) won the 2007 Gatewood Prize from feminist publisher Switchback Books.

Rooney was named one of the Best New Voices of 2006 by Random House, which included her essay "Live Nude Girl" in their influential anthology Twentysomething Essays by Twentysomething Writers. A book-length version, titled Live Nude Girl: My Life as an Object, was published by University of Arkansas Press in 2009.

In 2006, Rooney and Abigail Beckel co-founded Rose Metal Press, an independent not-for-profit publisher of hybrid genres (short short, flash, and micro-fiction; prose poetry; novels-in-verse; book-length linked narrative poems).

Rooney is a frequent collaborator with the poet Elisa Gabbert, with whom she has co-authored the collections Something Really Wonderful (2007), That Tiny Insane Voluptuousness (2008), Don't ever stay the same; keep changing (2009), and The Kind of Beauty That Has Nowhere to Go (2013).

In 2011, with poets Dave Landsberger and Eric Plattner, Rooney co-founded the Chicago not-for-profit poetry collective Poems While You Wait, which composes typewritten poetry on demand at local libraries, street & music festivals, museums, & art galleries.

Rooney's 2012 novel-in-verse Robinson Alone was inspired by the life & work of poet Weldon Kees and his alter-ego persona-character "Robinson". Her debut novel, O, Democracy!, was released by Fifth Star Press in Spring 2014 and her second novel, Lillian Boxfish Takes a Walk, loosely based on the life of Margaret Fishback, was released by St. Martin's Press in 2017. In 2020, Penguin released her third novel Cher Ami and Major Whittlesey, inspired by the true World War I story of the Lost Battalion.

A former U.S. Senate Aide, Rooney is a professor at DePaul University. She lives in Chicago with her husband, the writer Martin Seay and author of The Mirror Thief.

== Selected publications ==
- Cher Ami and Major Whittlesey, Penguin, 2020, ISBN 9780143135425
- Lillian Boxfish Takes a Walk, St. Martin's Press, 2017, ISBN 9781250113320
- O, Democracy!, Fifth Star Press, 2014, ISBN 9780984651092
- The Kind of Beauty That Has Nowhere to Go (with Elisa Gabbert, Hyacinth Girl Press, 2013)
- Robinson Alone, Gold Wake Press, 2012, ISBN 9780983700142
- For You, For You I Am Trilling These Songs. Counterpoint. 10 December 2009. ISBN 978-1-58243-683-8.
- Live Nude Girl: My Life as an Object, University of Arkansas Press, 2009, ISBN 9781557289490
- Don't ever stay the same; keep changing (with Elisa Gabbert, Spooky Girlfriend Press, 2009)
- Oneiromance (an epithalamion), Switchback Books, 2008, ISBN 9780978617233
- with Elisa Gabbert (2008). That Tiny Insane Voluptuousness. Lulu.com. ISBN 978-0-9804541-4-7.
- Something Really Wonderful (with Elisa Gabbert, Dancing Girl Press, 2007)
- Reading with Oprah: The Book Club that Changed America. University of Arkansas Press. 2005. ISBN 978-1-55728-782-3.
- Included in The &NOW Awards 2: The Best Innovative Writing (&NOW Books, 2013)
