= Chocobar Cortés =

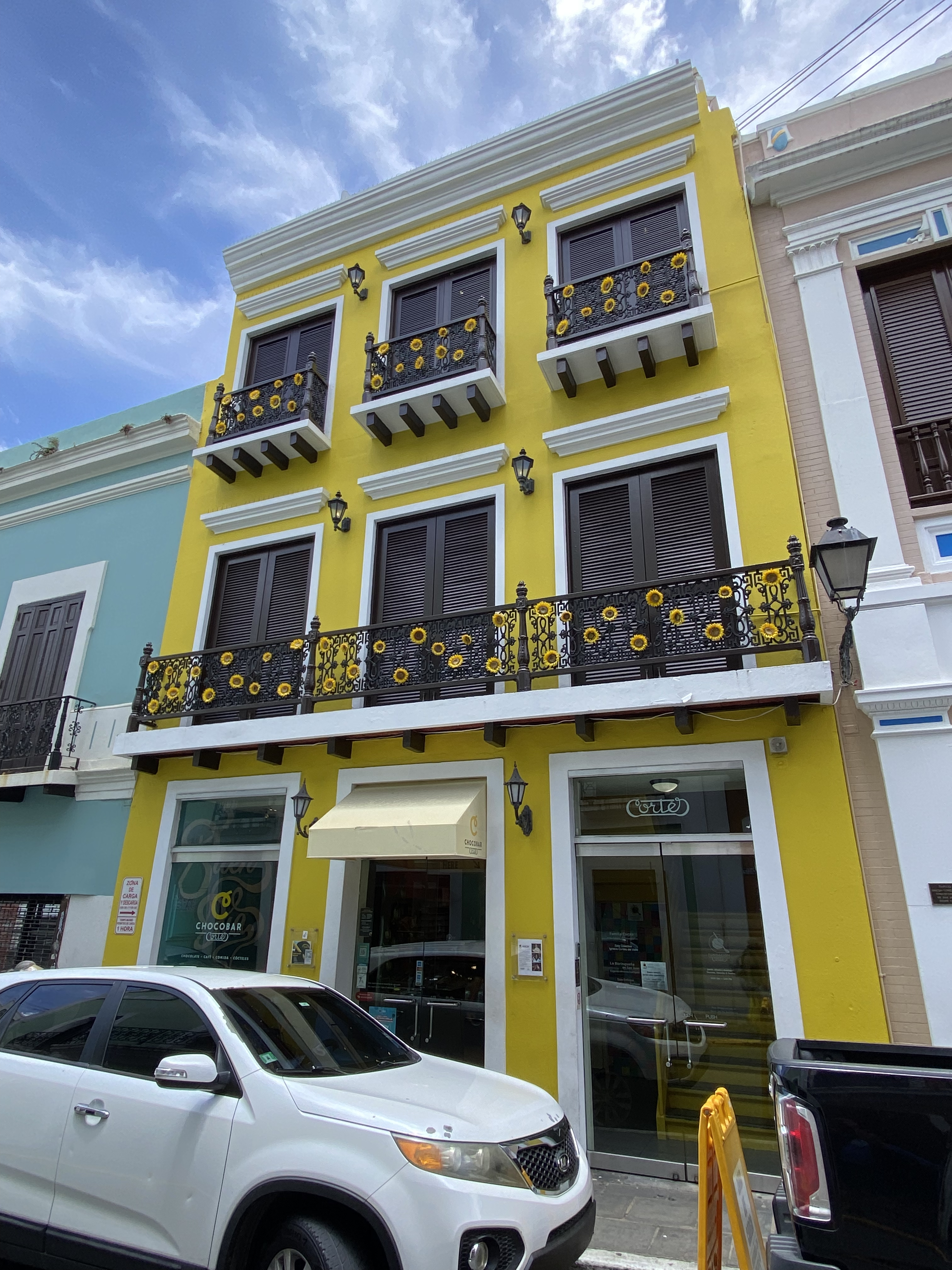
- The cafe's exterior in 2022
- Interactive map of Chocobar Cortés

Restaurant information
- Established: 2013
- Location: 210 Calle San Francisco, San Juan, Puerto Rico, 00901
- Other locations: Condado, Puerto Rico; South Bronx, New York

Chocobar Cortés is a restaurant brand originating in San Juan, Puerto Rico, that integrates chocolate into a variety of sweet and savory dishes. Founded in 2013 as an extension of the Chocolate Cortés manufacturing company, it has expanded to include a location in The Bronx.

== Description ==
Chocobar Cortés is a restaurant brand with origins in San Juan, Puerto Rico. It is an extension of Chocolate Cortés, a chocolate manufacturing company with factories in Puerto Rico and the Dominican Republic. The restaurants incorporate chocolate into a variety of sweet and savory dishes.

=== Menu ===
The menu includes items such as grilled cheese sandwiches made with chocolate butter, chocolate ketchup for curly fries, steaks with a chocolate rub, and croquettes with a chocolate dipping sauce. Additionally, it includes a range of hot chocolates, Bloody Marys with chocolate bitters, and chocolate guacamole served with avocado toast. A traditional Puerto Rican pairing of hot chocolate with cheddar cheese is also available. Specialty items include chalupitas de mofongo, stuffed with pork and topped with chocolate chili sauce.

== History ==
Chocobar Cortés was established in 2013 in San Juan by Elaine Shehab, who conceptualized the integration of chocolate into a restaurant setting. This initiative was supported by the Cortés family, which has operated its chocolate business for four generations. The Old San Juan location was later followed by the opening of a restaurant in the South Bronx, New York City, in December 2021. This expansion aimed to connect with the Puerto Rican and Dominican communities in the area and was led by Carlos Cortés, the creative director of Chocolate Cortés.

The menu design and the restaurant's ambiance incorporate elements of Puerto Rican culture and colonial architecture. The South Bronx location adopted influences from Old San Juan's aesthetic, including checkered floors and arched details.

== Reception ==
Chocobar Cortés has received attention for its approach to incorporating chocolate into diverse cuisines. Critics have noted the uniqueness of dishes like the chocolate grilled cheese and the combination of sweet and savory flavors. The Bronx location has been described as evoking nostalgia among patrons who associate the brand with family traditions and childhood experiences.

The reception to specific menu items has been mixed, with some dishes, such as the chocolate ketchup, eliciting polarized reactions. Nevertheless, the restaurant has been recognized as a bridge between cultural traditions and modern culinary experimentation.

== See also ==
- Fundación Cortés
