= Suárez, Colombia =

Suárez, Colombia may refer to:

- Suárez, Cauca
- Suárez, Tolima
