= Deportes Salvador Colom =

Puerto Rican sporting goods retailer

Deportes Salvador Colom (known commonly as Salvador Colom) is a Puerto Rican sporting goods retailing company. The company has been in business for seven decades. It was established during 1951.

== History ==
At one time during their history, Deportes Salvador Colom was one of the largest sporting goods selling companies in Puerto Rico as they had a presence in many strip shopping centers and malls across the island. There were stores in cities like Bayamon, Caguas, Ponce, San Juan and others. The dawn of the internet age and economic downturns in the United States meant that by the 2010s, the company had closed most of its shopping center locations and concentrated on internet only sales from their headquarters in Guaynabo.

By 2018, the company began to reestablish itself as a large, brick and mortar operation and open stores at places such as San Patricio Plaza in Guaynabo, Puerto Nuevo and other places.

Another economical downturn hit the company during 2021, this time attributed to the COVID-19 pandemic as many sporting competitions were cancelled in Puerto Rico.

== See also ==
- Sporting goods
- List of companies of Puerto Rico
