= Ponce Salt Industries =

Manufacturer of salt based in Ponce, Puerto Rico

Coordinates: 17°59′34.9362″N 66°43′13.4508″W

- Company type: Private
- Industry: Foods
- Founded: Ponce, Puerto Rico June 30, 1951; 74 years ago
- Founders: Juan E. Mayoral Renovales, Jorge Martín, Rafael Pou Vives
- Defunct: 31 December 1980
- Fate: Facilities converted to a shrimp aquaculture facility (1987-1991)
- Headquarters: Ponce, Puerto Rico
- Key people: Marcos Velez (Appeal Investment Caribe Corporation)
- Products: Salt

Ponce Salt Industries, Inc. was a manufacturer of salt based in Ponce, Puerto Rico. During its operating years, it dominated the salt market in Puerto Rico.

== History ==
Ponce Salt Industries was founded as Productos Salinos de Tallaboa on 30 June 1951 by Juan E. Mayoral Renovales, Jorge Martín, and Rafael Pou Vives. Juan E. Mayoral Renovales had also been the founder of Ponce Candy Industries. The company had locations in Barrio Encarnacion, Peñuelas, Puerto Rico, and at the Port of Ponce. Its Peñuelas location was at latitude 17.993038, longitude -66.720403 (a.k.a., 17° 59' 34.9362" and -66° 43' 13.4508"), where it had 71 acres of space.

== Operational profile ==
The company operated salt ponds in the extreme southwestern part of Puerto Rico and, in 1963, produced 6,000 tons of salt for use in the tannery and fishing and fish canning industries. It also imported some 12,000 tons of salt from Great Inagua, Bahamas, to refine into table salt. The company was a corporation under the Puerto Rico Industrial Development Plan. To support its import/export operations, in 1995 it rented warehouse space from the Ponce Municipal Government at the Port of Ponce warehouse facilities. The company operated until 1980.
