= WorldNet Telecommunications =

Telephone and internet provider in Puerto Rico

WorldNet Telecommunications, Inc.
- Company type: private
- Industry: telecommunications
- Founded: 1996
- Headquarters: Guaynabo, Puerto Rico
- Key people: David Bogaty (CEO)
- Products: broadband telephone
- Revenue: $42.07 million USD (FY 2010)
- Total assets: $24.13 million USD (FY 2011)
- Number of employees: 190 (November 2011)
- Website: worldnetpr.com

WorldNet Telecommunications is a competitive local exchange carrier that provides broadband Internet access and telephone services in Puerto Rico. The company is headquartered in Guaynabo.
