= Caribe.Net =

Telecommunications company in Puerto Rico

Critical Hub Networks, Inc.
- Trade name: Caribe.Net
- Type: private
- Industry: telecommunications
- Headquarters: San Juan, Puerto Rico
- Products: broadband telephone
- Website: http://www.caribe.net/

Caribe.Net, also known as Critical Hub Networks, is a telecommunications company that provides broadband internet access, data center and telephone services in Puerto Rico. The company is headquartered in San Juan. On April 26, 2010, the company received a $25.7 million federal award from the National Telecommunications and Information Administration for the Puerto Rico Bridge Initiative.

== History ==
Caribe.Net was founded in 1994 and was the first internet service provider in Puerto Rico.

In 1999, Caribe.Net was acquired by PSINet, the largest independent facilities-based ISP in the world. In 2001, the company was acquired back by the original shareholders. Caribe.Net was also co-founder of the Internet Society of Puerto Rico and Network Access Point (NAP) of the Caribbean. In 2007, Caribe.Net teamed up with Voz to offer Enterprise-Level Telephone Services VoIP over Caribe.Net's Internet services.

In 2010, Critical Hub Networks Inc. received a $25.7 million ARRA grant through the U.S. Department of Commerce to bridge the technological divide, boost economic growth, create jobs, and improve education and health care through the improvement of broadband internet services in Puerto Rico. The project awarded is the Puerto Rico Bridge Initiative.

On February 22, 2011, Critical Hub Networks officially inaugurated the Puerto Rico Bridge Initiative, which established the PRBI Internet Exchange Point (IXP) in San Juan, Puerto Rico. Congressman Pedro Pierluisi participated in the inauguration event.
