= Fundación Cortés =

Fundación Cortés is a nonprofit organization founded by Chocolate Cortés in Puerto Rico in 1912. It is focused on cultural and educational initiatives through art and the humanities. It operates programs such as Educa Cortés, which integrates art and emotional wellness, and maintains a collection of Caribbean and Latin American art used in its educational efforts.

== History ==
Fundación Cortés was established in 2012 as a private, nonprofit organization aimed at promoting cultural and educational initiatives through art and the humanities.

Following Hurricane Maria in 2017, the foundation adapted its operations to address community needs. It organized a temporary school, named Educa Cortés, in its facilities in Old San Juan. This initiative provided daily education to approximately 35 children, accommodating a total of 115 students from public schools across Puerto Rico. The program incorporated art as a therapeutic tool to help students and families navigate the post-disaster reality.

== Operations ==
Fundación Cortés programs emphasize art, education, and well-being. Its program, Educa Cortés, offers interactive workshops that integrate creative expression and emotional wellness. The initiative initially arose as a response to the mental health challenges faced by communities after Hurricane Maria and has since impacted over 14,500 public school students.

The foundation collaborates with other organizations to expand its programs. In partnership with Albizu University, it established "El Arte del Bienestar," a program that combines art appreciation with mental health workshops. Fundación Cortés offers financial literacy workshops and distributes educational materials to participants.

== Permanent collection ==
Fundación Cortés maintains an extensive collection of Caribbean and Latin American art, housed in its facility in Old San Juan. The collection includes works by Haitian artists and serves as a cornerstone for its educational programs.

In 2018, the foundation hosted exhibitions highlighting Haitian art and cultural history. These exhibitions featured paintings, photography, and multimedia installations from its collection, emphasizing the shared cultural and historical ties within the Caribbean.
