= Chocolate Cortés =

Chocolate manufacturer in Puerto Rico

- Industry: Food processing
- Founded: 1929
- Founder: Pedro Cortés Forteza
- Headquarters: Puerto Rico; Dominican Republic
- Key people: Ignacio Cortés Gelpí (president); Eduardo Cortés Shehab (executive vice-president)
- Website: chocolatecortes.com

Chocolate Cortés, legally Cortés Hermanos (Dominican Republic) and Sucesores Pedro Cortés (Puerto Rico), is a privately-held, family-owned company operating in the Dominican Republic since 1929 and Puerto Rico since 1931. Established by Puerto Rican businessman Pedro Cortés Forteza, the company is one of the largest cocoa producers and chocolate manufacturers in the Caribbean. It is led by Cortés Forteza’s grandson, Ignacio Cortés Gelpí, and his great-grandson, Eduardo Cortés Shehab, both of whom are native to Puerto Rico.

The company also owns the Chocobar Cortés restaurants in San Juan and New York City, and the Fundación Cortés, a nonprofit organization based in Old San Juan focused on cultural and educational initiatives through art and the humanities.

== History ==
Chocolate Cortés began in the Dominican Republic in 1929 and Puerto Rico in 1931 under the leadership of Puerto Rican businessman Pedro Cortés Forteza. In 1894, he was born in Manatí, Puerto Rico to Ignacio Cortés Valls and María Forteza Alcovar, immigrants from Mallorca, Balearic Islands in Spain. Córtes Forteza died in San Juan, Puerto Rico in 1956, leaving the company to his son Ignacio Cortés del Valle, who was born in Manatí in 1922. When Cortés del Valle died in San Juan in 2006, his son Ignacio Cortés Gelpí took over the company. All born and raised in San Juan, Cortés Gelpí and his three sons, Ignacio Javier, Eduardo Andrés, and Carlos Marcial, are involved in the company, making it a fourth-generation family-owned enterprise.

== See also ==
- Chocobar Cortés
- Fundación Cortés
