= The Mirror Thief =

2016 novel by Martin Seay

- First edition
- Authors: Martin Seay
- Language: English
- Genre: fiction
- Publisher: Melville House
- Publication date: 2016
- ISBN: 9781612195599
- OCLC: 1004774853

The Mirror Thief is a 2016 debut novel authored by Martin Seay. "Set in three different versions of Venice (Italy, California, and Las Vegas) during three different time periods (16th century, mid-20th, early 21st)," it follows Mark Lawson's reading of The Mirror Thief, a book tied to Stanley Glass.

== Plot ==
The plot is "set in three different versions of Venice (Italy, California, and Las Vegas) during three different time periods (16th century, mid-20th, early 21st)." It follows Curtis Stone as he looks for card counter Stanley Glass in Las Vegas, Nevada, but instead finds a book which "inspired" Glass's life called The Mirror Thief; this takes Stone into a mise en abyme through his reading.

In a review for The Guardian, Mark Lawson noted that "Topics under consideration range from why bingo is a fascist game, through penetrating reflections on the poetry of Ezra Pound and techniques of glass-making, to the visual resemblance between the French philosopher Michel Foucault and the Greek-American actor Telly Savalas."

== Critical reception ==
The novel received good reviews from The New York Times and The Guardian.
