= Puerto Rico Daily Sun =

Daily English-language newspaper

- Type: Daily newspaper
- Format: Tabloid
- Founded: 29 October 2008
- Language: English
- Website: prdailysun.com

The Puerto Rico Daily Sun was a short-lived daily English-language newspaper that was published between October 2008 and 2011 in Puerto Rico. At the time, it was the only English-language daily on the island. The paper was based in San Juan and had a daily circulation of 35,000. It was published seven days a week by Cooperativa Prensa Unida. It succeeded the San Juan Star, which ended publication on August 29, 2008, after an almost 49-year run. Reporters had gone several weeks without being paid. Cooperativa Prensa Unida's incorporation was cancelled in May 2012.

== History ==
The paper launched on October 29, 2008. The Puerto Rico Daily Sun had 85 employees, its editor was Rafael Matos, a 25-year veteran of the Associated Press, and its managing editor was Ángel Matos. Among the paper's reporters was Omaya Sosa Pascual, founder of Puerto Rico's Center for Investigative Journalism. It was Puerto Rico's first cooperative-style newspaper and was born from the efforts of 90 former employees of The San Juan Star who each contributed a minimum of $200 in shares of the United Press Cooperative in an effort to start the paper. Six reporters covered topics such as politics, health and the economy. The weekday and Saturday dailies sold for 50 cents while the Sunday edition sold for $1.50. Marisol Lora, also a former San Juan Star editor, became the Daily Sun's executive editor.
