= Ponce Candy Industries =

Multi-national manufacturer of confectionary sweets based in Ponce, Puerto Rico

Coordinates: 18°0′23″N 66°35′39″W

- Type: Private
- Industry: Confectionery
- Founded: Ponce, Puerto Rico (1940)
- Headquarters: Ponce, Puerto Rico; Branches:. *Spain (Fiesta, S.L.U.). *Venezuela (Fiesta, C.A.)
- Key people: Juan Eugenio Mayoral Renovales
- Products: Hard candy, sweets, bubble gum, toffees, gummies
- Number of employees: Ponce: 300+ Spain: 130; Venezuela: unknown
- Website: https://www.fiesta.es/es

Ponce Candy Industries was a multi-national manufacturer of confectionery sweets based in Ponce, Puerto Rico, best known for its "Fiesta" brand of candy products. The company was founded in 1940 by Juan Eugenio Mayoral Renovales, Jorge Martín and Rafael Pou. It later expanded into Venezuela in 1946 as "Fiesta C.A.", and into Spain in 1965 as Fiesta Colombina S.L.U. The company's Ponce facility closed in 2002, but continued operating in Spain. The company's last remaining manufacturing plant in Spain became insolvent on 22 September 2014, and went into liquidation, seeking a buyer. The company's 1940s Art Deco building on PR-1 in Barrio Sabanetas in Ponce is now owned by Caribbean University who, in 2002 and in coordination with the Ponce Municipal Government, had plans to convert the facility into a candy museum.

== History ==
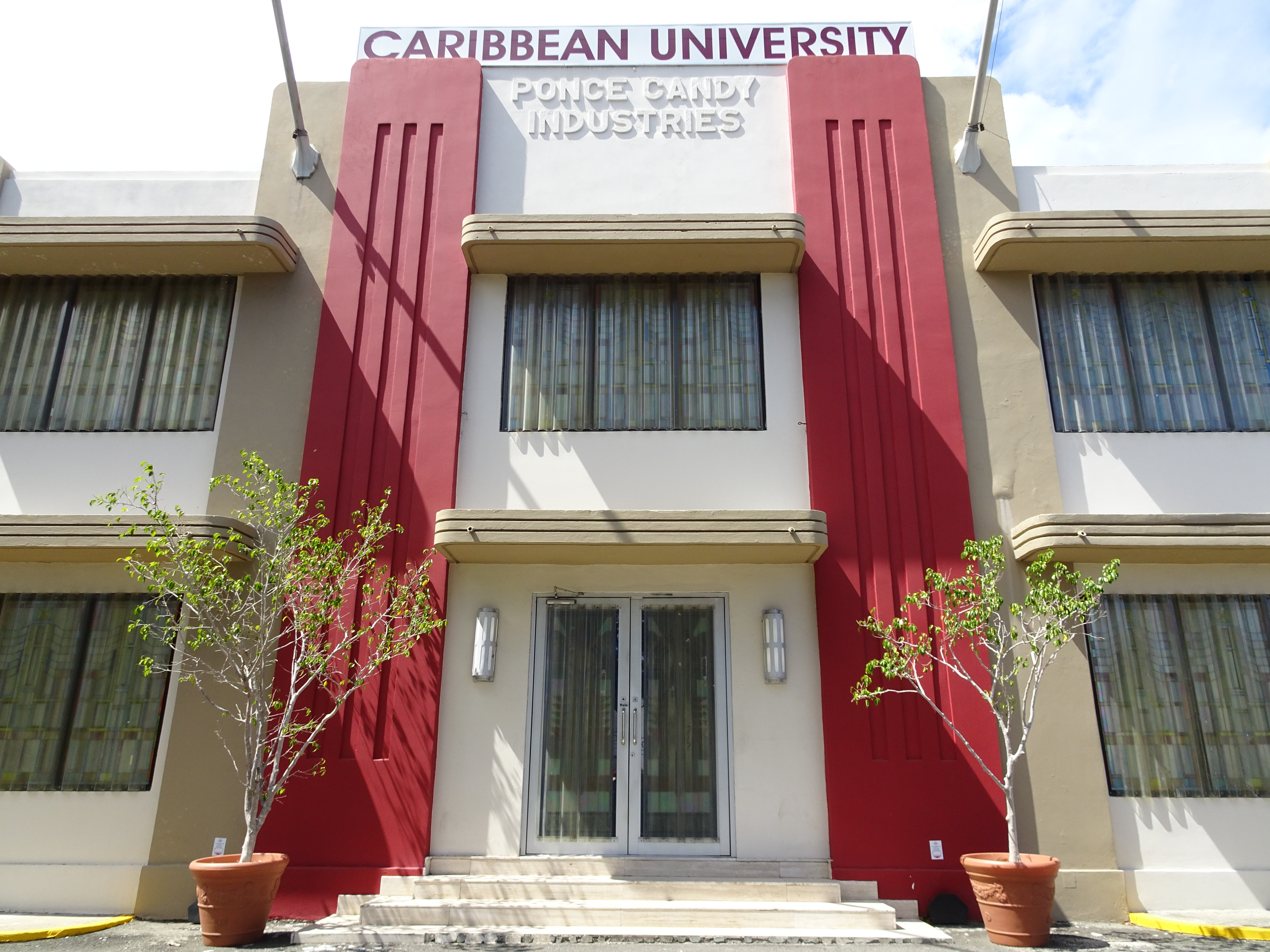
Former headquarters of Ponce Candy Industries, on Avenida La Ceiba, Barrio Sabanetas, Ponce

The company was founded in Ponce, Puerto Rico, in 1940. It manufactured confectioned products using sugar obtained from sugar cane processed at the nearby Central Mercedita, also in Ponce.

In the 1950s, a marketing company proposes the name "Fiesta" to the Ponce Candy management, and Ponce Candy industries starts manufacturing its products under that name. At around the same time, the company opens operations in Venezuela under the name "Fiesta C.A.". The same year, the company started manufacturing lollipops. In 1965 the company opened operations in Madrid at Alcalá de Henares, as "Fiesta, S.A.".

During the 1970s, the company experimented with a new lollipop that had candy stuffed with bubble gum and started marketing them in Spain. It named this bubble gum-stuffed lollipop "Kojak", after the movie character. It became a huge success. It would eventually be manufactured in Ponce and Venezuela under the Fiesta brand. The bubble gum-filled lollipop began to be manufactured in Puerto Rico for the prestigious U.S. based Charms Company.

In 1984, Fiesta introduced "Fresquito", a lollipop sprinkled with hot flavoring.

== Company profile ==
The company had over 300 employees in Ponce, and more than 130 in Spain. The company manufactured in Puerto Rico, Spain, and Venezuela, but sold in those as well as other countries, including the United Kingdom and the United States. In Spain alone, the company had a distribution network with over 40,000 retail outlets. In 2014, the company had a sales portfolio of €18.8 million.

== Liquidation ==
The 2014 sale of the company sought to execute two sales: on for the company itself (products, brand names, distribution network, manufacturing and production rights, etc.) and the physical facilities consisting of 26,800 m2 of space. The first was valued at €12 million and the later at €6.7 million. Over 50 companies have shown interest in the sale, including some with the backing of KPMG, PricewaterhouseCoopers, Deloitte and Ernst & Young. In a "first-of-its-kind", the sale is being done via online purchase proposals; the court-appointed liquidator assures this provides transparency and fairness.

== Popular culture ==
Fiesta jelly beans and sticky swirl candies were used in scenes of the extraterrestrial TV series "V".
