= Suárez, Tolima =

Suárez
- Municipality and town
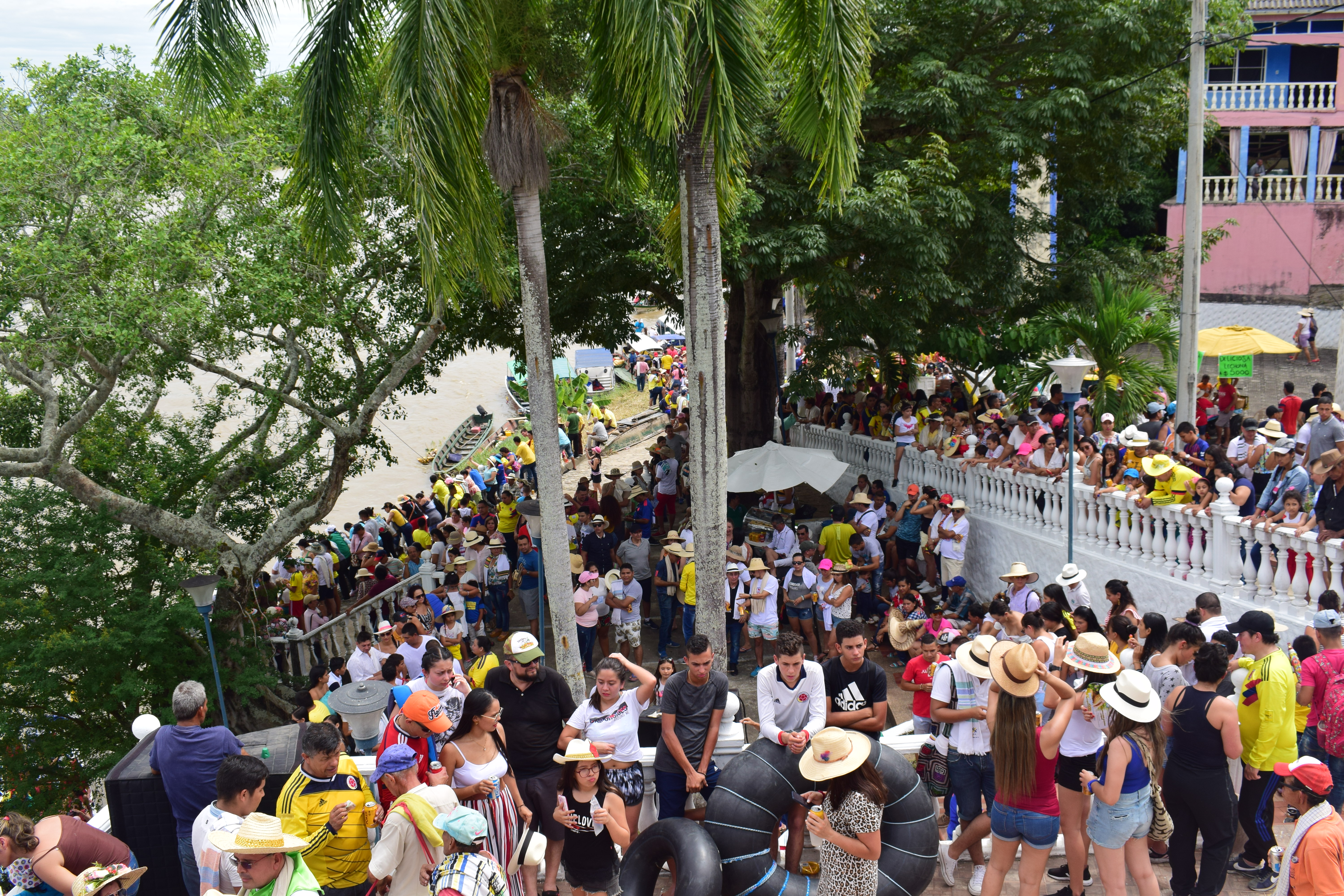
- Festivities in Suárez

- Flag Coat of arms

- Location of the municipality and town of Suárez in the Tolima Department of Colombia.
- Coordinates: 4°33′N 74°50′W
- Country: Colombia
- Department: Tolima Department
- Founded: 1696

Area
  - Municipality and town: 194 km^{2} (75 sq mi)
- Elevation: 290 m (950 ft)

Population (2005)
  - Municipality and town: 4,519
  - Density: 23.29/km^{2} (60.3/sq mi)
  - Urban: 1,945
  - Rural: 2,547
- Time zone: UTC-5 (Colombia Standard Time)
- Website: http://www.suarez-tolima.gov.co

Suárez (Spanish pronunciation: [ˈswaɾes]) is a town and municipality in the Tolima department of Colombia.
