= V. Suarez & Co. =

Puerto Rico large commercial group

V. Suárez Group is one of Puerto Rico's largest commercial groups. Founded in 1943, the organization has grown and diversified.

== Subsidiaries ==
Today V. Suárez Group is diversified into three distinct businesses:

- V. Suárez Division - The leading consumer product distribution entity in Puerto Rico with special interests in beverage and provision distribution. Additionally the division runs "El Horreo", a consumer retail wine store.
- V.Suárez Investment Co. - A diversified investment management company focused on maximizing investment income through a variety of investment instruments both within and outside of Puerto Rico.
- V.Suárez Real Estate Group - A real estate development and management company focused principally on the warehouse and office segments of the market.

Each of these three operating entities is supported by a centralized corporate services group composed of Executive Management, MIS, Finance & Accounting and Human Resources. The corporate services group ensures that managerial systems and processes are in place, and that adequate resources are allocated against business/market opportunities to ensure success and build stakeholder value.
