= Martex Farms =

Company based in Santa Isabel, Puerto Rico

Coordinates: 17°58′46.16″N 66°20′56.29″W

- Company type: Private
- Industry: Agriculture
- Founded: 1989
- Headquarters: PR-1 Km 96.2, Santa Isabel, Puerto Rico
- Key people: Venancio "Veny" Marti, President
- Products: mangos, bananas, avocados, palm trees
- Website: http://www.martexfarms.com/

Martex Farms is a Puerto Rican company based in Santa Isabel, Puerto Rico, an area known as the "Ruta Agrícola" (Agricultural Route). It is the largest banana, avocado and tropical palm grower on the south coast of the island.

== History ==
The company was founded in 1989 and incorporated in Puerto Rico. It 1991 the company had 1,000 acres in process of development.

In 2001, Martex Farms bought Fruits International’s Pango Mango brand for an amount believed to be worth "several million dollars." Fruits International, located in barrio Coto Laurel of the municipality of Ponce, was Puerto Rico’s largest mango grower.

== Corporate profile ==
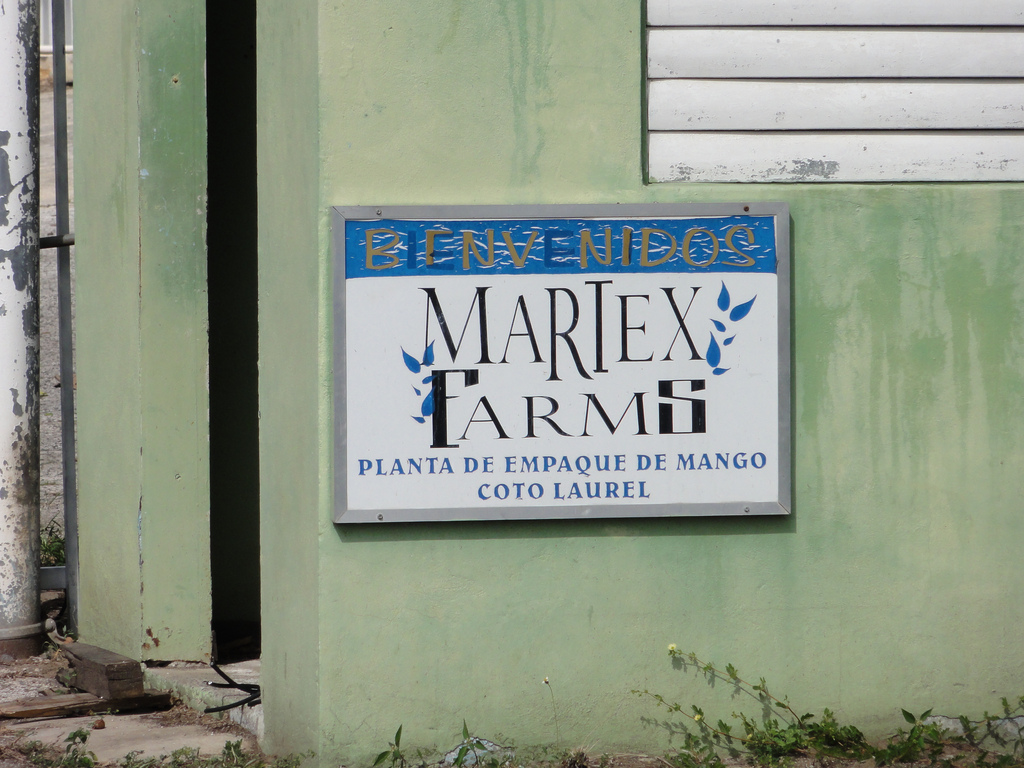
Sign at the entrance of the Mango Packaging Plant of Martex Farms during the off-season (January), in Barrio Coto Laurel, Ponce, Puerto Rico

Martex Farms president is Venancio "Veny" Marti. The other partners in this family-based company are Venancio's brother Gustavo and Venancio's son Veny Luis Marti. Martex Farms has about 200 employees plus another 200 seasonal employees.

The company is the largest family-owned mango grower in Puerto Rico and Latin America. It has over 2,000 acres of orchards. It packages over 25 million pounds of mangos, representing 2.4 million nine-pound boxes a year." The company exports 3 varieties of mangos to England, the Netherlands, Spain, Germany, France and the United States.

For its European markets, Martex Farms mangos supplies 15% of Europe’s mangos, and during the months of June through August – when Puerto Rico dominates over its closest competitors, Mexico and Israel. In, it supplies most mangoes in Europe.

== Crops ==
Martex Farms’ main crop is the banana. Most of Martex Farms bananas are sold locally to Amigo and Pueblo and Xtra Supermarkets. Other clients are in the Virgin Islands and the cruise ships. It also produces avocados, tropical exotic fruits and tropical palm trees and ornamental plants.

== Challenges ==
=== Theft of crops ===
In late 2011, the company fell prey to a series of robberies that started with crops but later also came to include equipment and other items. The company reported that some 15% of its production is lost to theft.

=== Shipping ===
One recent challenge the company has faced relates to the shipping of its mango products to European markets. The company estimates the Puerto Rican economy of losing "millions" of dollars due to the failure of shipping companies to haul its mango products from the port of Ponce to European ports, where the fruit "sells exceedingly well". "Shipping companies prefer the predictability of year-round products vs. seasonal items such as tropical fruits," according to the company president.

== Future plans ==
Among the company's future plans are the marketing of packaged mango slices and a carbonated refreshment called Mango Rico.
