= Department stores by country =

Department stores are an established retail format globally. The format has origins in France, the United Kingdom and United States, among many others.

== Americas ==
=== Argentina ===
In Buenos Aires, upscale department stores came during the early years of the 20th century. Gath & Chaves opened in 1905 and Harrods Buenos Aires was established in 1912. The Chilean department store Falabella was one of the most prominent in the country, with branches in Buenos Aires, Córdoba, San Juan, Mendoza, and Rosario. Falabella left the Argentinian market by closing all its stores in 2021, due to COVID-19 effects, the economic crisis and the country's poor business situation, leaving the country without any department stores.

=== Brazil ===
Traditional department stores such as Mesbla and Mappin practically disappeared from Brazilian landscape in the 90s, with the upscale Daslu surviving until the late 2000s. Brazil's economic instability and the growing dominance of the internet in the retail market make it difficult for a wide variety of department stores to exist in the country, with only more consolidated chains such as Lojas Americanas, Magazine Luiza and Havan prevailing.

=== Canada ===
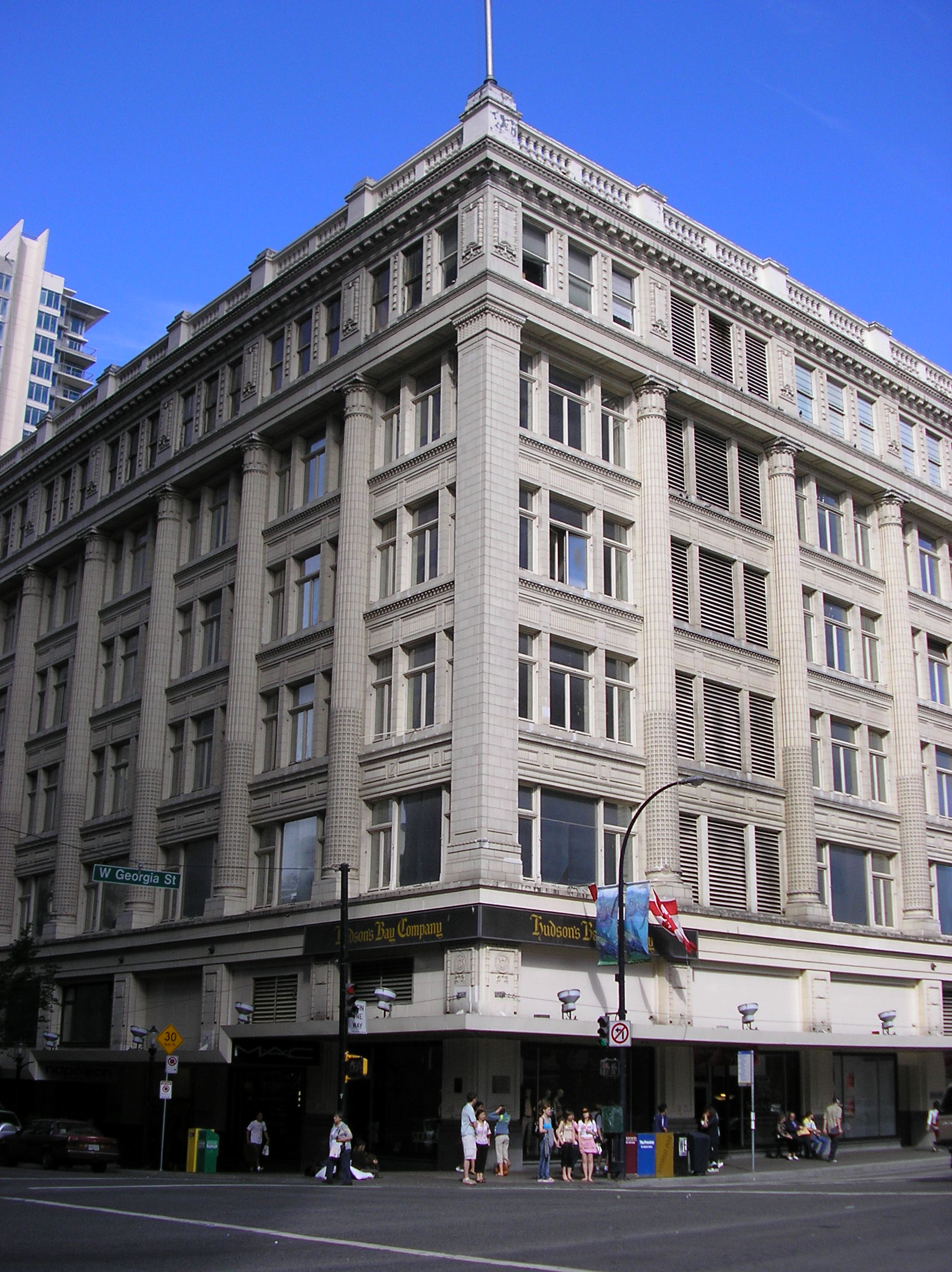
The Bay in Vancouver

Historically, department stores were a significant component in Canadian economic life, and chain stores such as Eaton's, Charles Ogilvy Limited, Freiman's, Spencer's, Simpsons, Morgan's, and Woodward's were staples in their respective communities. Department stores in Canada are similar in design and style to department stores in the United States. Before the 1950s, the department store held an eminent place in both Canada and Australia, during both the Great Depression and World War II. Since then, they have suffered from strong competition from specialist stores. Most recently the competition has intensified with the advent of larger-scale superstores (Jones et al. 1994; Merrilees and Miller 1997). Also, the changing structure of cities affected them.

From its origins in the fur trade, the Hudson's Bay Company is the oldest corporation in North America and was the largest department store operator in Canada until the mid-1980s, with locations across the country. It also previously owned Zellers, another major Canadian department store which ceased to exist in March 2013 after selling its lease holdings to Target Canada. Other department stores in Canada are: Canadian Tire, Ogilvy, Les Ailes de la Mode, Giant Tiger, Co-op, Costco and Holt Renfrew. Grocery giant Superstores carry many non-grocery items akin to a department store. Woolco had 160 stores in Canada when operations ceased (Walmart bought out Woolco in 1994). Today the low-price Walmart is by far the most dominant department store retailer in Canada with outlets throughout the country. In northern or isolated communities The North West Company (named after the historical North West Company fur trade company) operates smaller department stores.

=== Chile ===
Albeit relatively small, the domestic Chilean retail market has proved fiercely competitive with several department stores sprouting in Santiago and then expanding north and south of Santiago. Leading department stores today include Falabella, Ripley, Almacenes París and La Polar. Falabella, founded in 1889, has opened branches in Colombia, and Peru, with París – its main Chilean competitor – coming on its heels.

=== Colombia ===
In Colombia, upscale department stores came in the mid-20th century when Sears entered the country. Today, the Chilean department store Falabella is one of the most prominent in the country, with branches in Barranquilla, Cali, Bogota, Medellin, Pereira and Bucaramanga. Falabella is one of the most popular stores in Colombia today.

=== Cuba ===
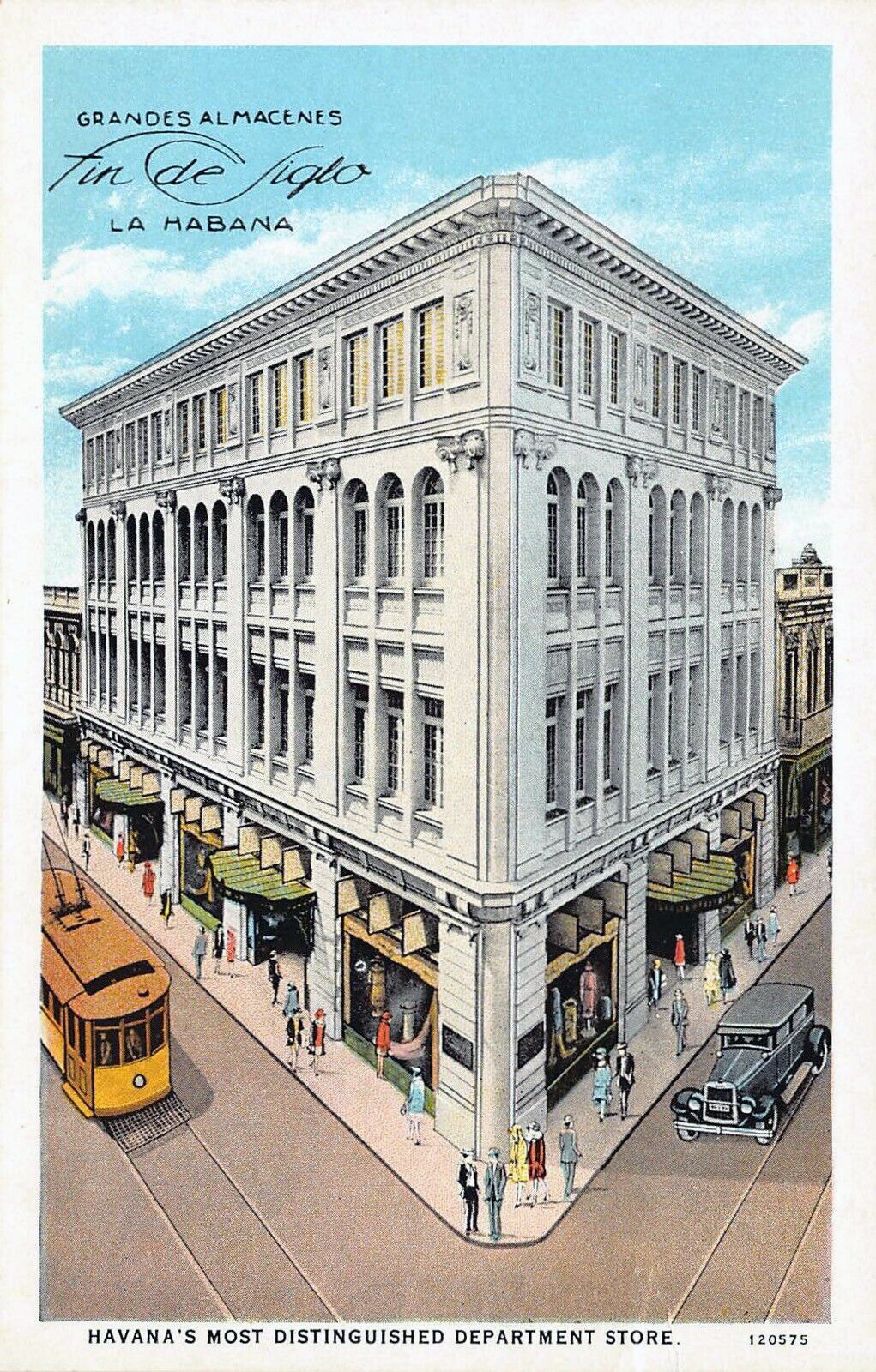
Postcard of Havana's Fin de Siglo, 1928

Large department stores lined Havana's Galiano and Reina streets, including La Época, El Encanto, Fin de Siglo (founded 1897), and Almacenes Ultra, and largely resembled their equivalents in large U.S. cities. In 1960-1, one to two years after Fidel Castro came to power, the Cuban state nationalized all of them without compensating their owners. Western goods were replaced by a far inferior selection of Soviet Bloc and domestic goods. The state rationed goods and imposed a new distribution system. Without investment, or even new paint, the buildings gradually deteriorated. Eventually, the stores came to display what essentially were displays of what to the Western eye appeared to be odds and ends of whatever was available, with for example, mismatched assortments of tools, bolts or screws next to bras or spools of cloth. La Época operates today as state-run retailers, while El Encanto which was destroyed by fire in 1961 then razed, while the state closed Fin de Siglo and Ultra in the 2020s.

=== Mexico ===
Mexico has a mix of traditional department stores founded in the 19th century on the French model, plus chains that came from the U.S. in the early 20th century, plus – far greater in number – strong, ubiquitous local discount chains like Elektra and Coppel.

==== Traditional department stores ====
Traditional department store chains include:

- El Palacio de Hierro opened in 1891, sells high-end and luxury goods; an earlier incarnation called Las Fábricas de Francia opened in 1850. Its flagship store in Polanco, Mexico City, which the company calls "El Palacio de los Palacios" ("The palace of all palaces"), is the largest department store in Latin America.
- Liverpool (upper-middle income, with origins dating back to 1847), with its mid-range sister store Fábricas de Francia (no relation to the predecessor of El Palacio de Hierro).
- Grupo Carso operates Sears Mexico. (and used to operate Saks Fifth Avenue when it had 2 stores in Mexico, in Mexico City)
- Wal-Mart operates Suburbia, a mainline department store for lower-to-middle-income shoppers, and competes with Chedraui in the hypermarket/supermarkets segments with its Walmart, Bodega Aurrera, and Superama chains.
- Dorian's, now defunct was long the well-known department store of Tijuana and other northwestern cities
- Cimaco is a 7-store chain in northern Mexico, based in Torreón, Coahuila state

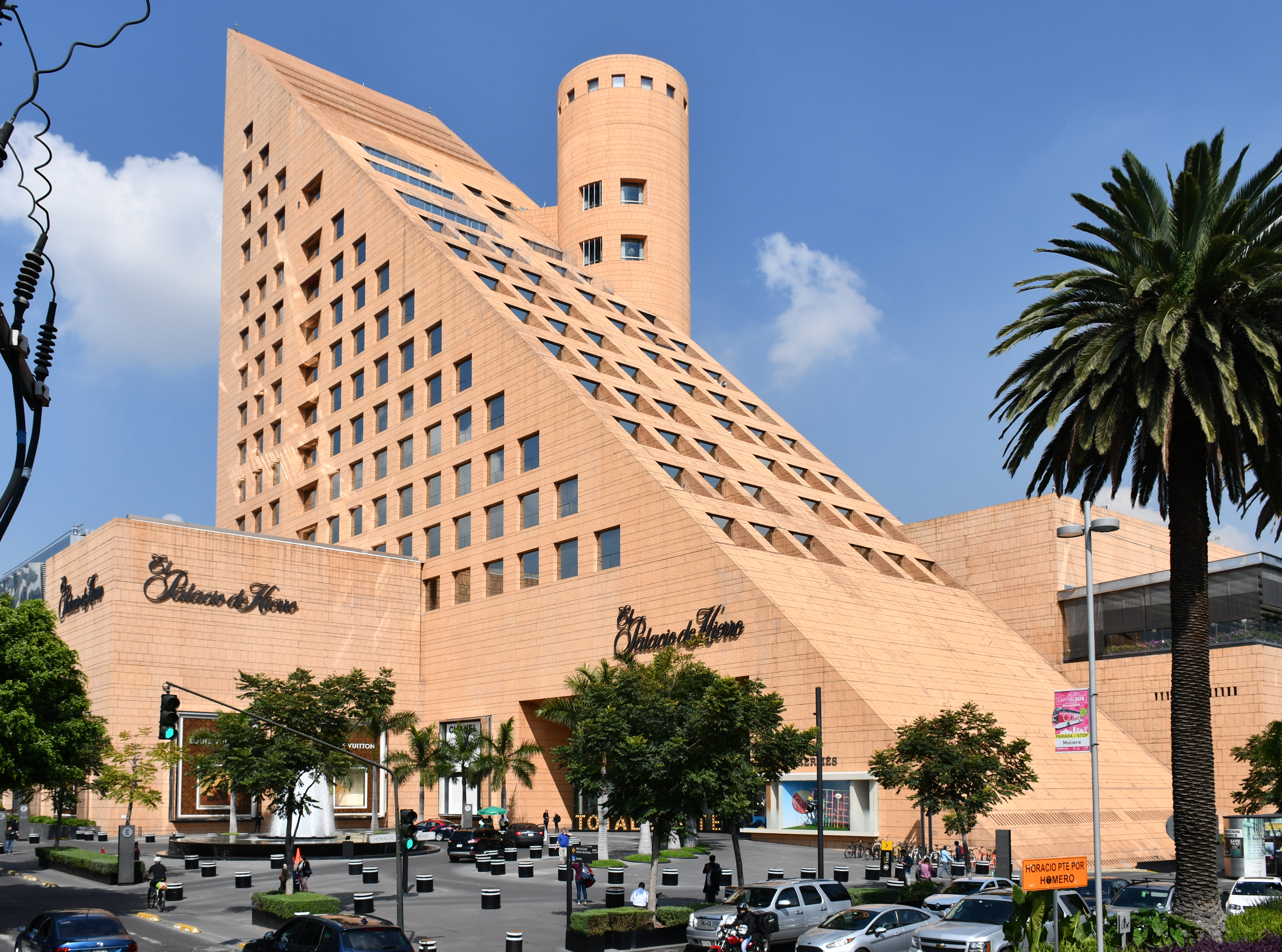
El Palacio de Hierro's Mexico City Polanco flagship, the largest department store in Latin America.

==== Discount and variety stores ====
- Coppel, small department stores catering to the lower-middle and middle market, the second-largest retailer in Mexico with over 1700 locations, about 1300 of which also provide services of a full BanCoppel bank branch,
- Elektra, part of Grupo Salinas, 1200+ stores, with an average store size of 990 m^{2} (10,700 ft^{2}) – and easy credit facilities for the working and lower middle classes. Elektra absorbed its rival Salinas y Rocha in the early 2020s.
- Sanborns, also part of Grupo Carso, owns over 100 compact, midrange stores that carry an unusual combination of goods: giftable items such as decorative sculptures, cosmetics and perfume, pharmacy, electronics, televisions, small appliances, bakery, liquor and wine, apparel, luggage, books and magazines. But the chain began as a restaurant, and a restaurant area is the heart of almost all Sanborns, sometimes with a bar attached.
- Suburbia (department store) a chain of apparel-focused junior department stores with 170+ locations across the country. Like Liverpool, owned by El Puerto de Liverpool group
- Waldo's, similar to a U.S. dollar store, operates over 700 stores in all 32 states.
- PesoRama, similar to Canadian dollar store chain Dollarama, operates 23 JOi Dollar Plus stores in Mexico
- Woolworth operates several dozen Woolworth and Del Sol branded variety stores in Central Mexico.

Hypermarkets include Walmart Mexico and Central America, and those of the main supermarket chains (which often anchor neighborhood shopping centers, sometimes along with multiplex cinemas): Soriana, Chedraui, Comercial Mexicana, and in northwestern Mexico, Calimax. Membership-based superstores include Bodega Aurrerá, Sam's Club and Costco.

==== Conglomerates ====
Grupo Carso and Walmart have a very strong mark in the country, and particularly in Mexico City. Foreign chains such as J. C. Penney had previously entered the Mexican market, but they failed to gain popularity. Sears likewise originally had little success after it opened its first department store in Mexico City in 1947, despite its current success.

=== Panama ===
Panama's first department stores such as Bazaar Francés, La Dalia and La Villa de Paris started as textile retailers at the turn of the nineteenth century. In the twentieth century these eventually gave way to stores such as Felix B. Maduro, Sarah Panamá, Figali, Danté, Sears, Gran Morrison and smaller ones such as Bon Bini, Cocos, El Lider, Piccolo and Clubman. Of these, only Felix B. Maduro (usually referred to as Felix by locals) and Danté remain strong. All the others have either folded or declined although Cocos has managed to secure a good position in the market.

Today, other major department stores include Steven's and Collin's. There are also many discount department stores such as Conway, which includes a furniture and decoration department named Conway Design. Others include La Onda, Dorian's, Saks, Madison Store and El Titan.

=== Paraguay ===
Monalisa (1972) is a department store in Paraguay. It has a vast variety of luxury and high end brands, all in one department store. It has a wine cellar with over 100,000 wine bottles, with the majority from France, as well as wine from Spain and Italy.

=== Peru ===
Peru started with department stores in the 19th century, with the arrival of Oechsle in 1888. Then came other stores like Sears in 1952, acquired by Chilean group Falabella in 1995, which converted them into Falabella stores, followed by Ripley in 1997 and Paris in 2013.

Currently, the largest department stores are Falabella, Oechsle, and Ripley. Paris department stores operated in Peru from 2013 until his exit in 2020, due to the COVID-19 effects.

=== Puerto Rico ===
In Puerto Rico, various national department store chains have operated over the years on the island, such as Sears, Woolworth, JC Penney, Macy's, Kmart, Wal-Mart, Marshalls, Burlington Coat Factory, T.J. Maxx, Costco, Sam's Club and others. The oldest native department store on the island was the high-end department chain González Padín established in 1884, until the closure of the chain in 1995 due to economic problems. In the 1930s two major department chains established themselves on the island, New York Department Stores in 1931, and Es de Velasco in 1939. During the 1980s and 1990s, as the Puerto Rican economic development model stagnated, many of the locally owned department stores such as these past three, especially those that sold high end goods, struggled to compete effectively with American chain stores and closed respectively. But during this period of time other locally owned discount department stores flourished expanding on the island such as Topeka, Capri and Pitusa. During the 2000s and 2010s, a decline would begin with the expansion of American department store chains on the island, causing the closure of the Topeka and Pitusa chains respectively. In the 2010s, retailers Nordstrom and Saks Fifth Avenue entered the Puerto Rico market by anchoring a new upscale mall, The Mall of San Juan. However, Saks Fifth Avenue left in 2017 due to Hurricane Maria and Nordstrom announced its closure in 2020. New department store chains actively plan to enter island such as Ross Dress For Less, which plans to start opening stores on the island starting in 2024.

=== United States ===
The compact and centralized 19th century city with its mass transit lines converging on the downtown was a perfect environment for department store growth. But as residents moved out of the downtown areas to the suburbs, the large, downtown department stores became inconvenient and lost business to the newer suburban shopping centres. In 2003, U.S. department store sales were surpassed by big-box store sales for the first time (though some stores may be classified as "big box" by physical layout and "department store" by merchandise).

==== Chains and variety stores ====
Chain department stores grew rapidly after 1920, and provided competition for the downtown upscale department stores, as well as local department stores in small cities. Many if not most of these were part of three large retail chains: Allied Stores, Federated Stores, and Mercantile Stores.

Mid-level retailers included Sears, Montgomery Ward, and J. C. Penney. Penney's had four stores in 1908, 312 in 1920, and 1452 in 1930.

Sears, Roebuck & Company, a giant mail-order house, opened its first eight retail stores in 1925, and operated 338 by 1930, and 595 by 1940. The chains reached a middle-class audience that was more interested in value than in upscale fashions. Sears was a pioneer in creating department stores that catered to men as well as women, especially with lines of hardware and building materials. It deemphasized the latest fashions in favor of practicality and durability, and allowed customers to select goods without the aid of a clerk. Some of its stores were oriented to motorists – set apart from existing business districts amid residential areas occupied by their target audience; had ample, free, off-street parking; and communicated a clear corporate identity. In the 1930s, the company designed fully air-conditioned, "windowless" stores whose layout was driven wholly by merchandising concerns.

At the lower end of the scale were the variety stores, especially the dime stores, led by Woolworth, Kresge, and Kress. They operated over 4,200 stores in 1930. By the 21st century, the dime store disappeared and the niche of low-cost, high turnover merchandise was taken over by the dollar stores.

The 2000s have seen a worldwide decline in department stores with the rise of e-commerce. The number of companies operating department stores dropped from 95 (operating 9,969 stores) in 2006 to 68 (operating 9,456 stores) in 2013.

==== Segmentation ====
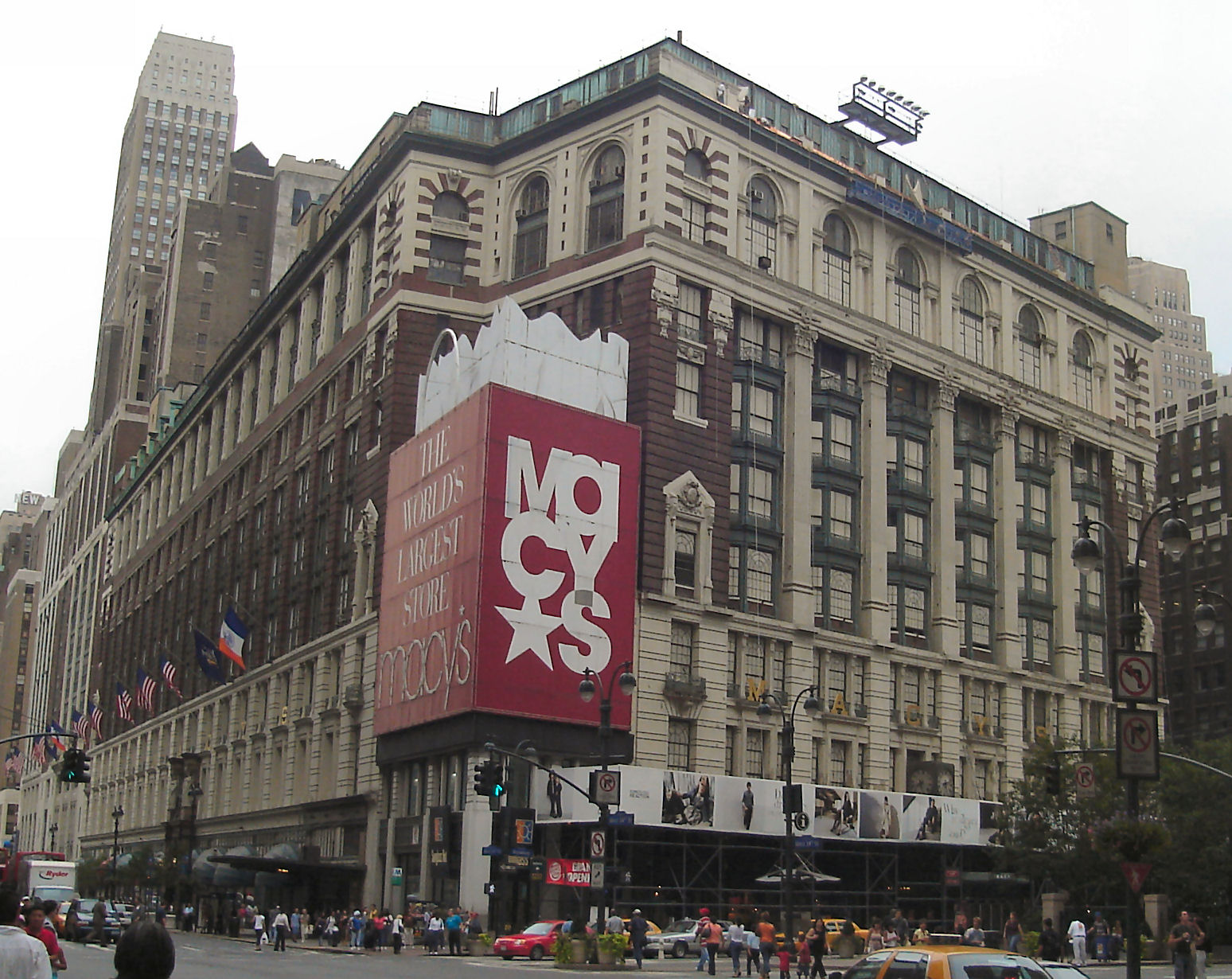
Macy's Herald Square, the Macy's flagship department store in New York City with its famous Million Dollar Corner brownstone at 34th Street and Broadway

Department stores tend to target different socio-economic and geographic segments:

- Upscale/Luxury: Saks Fifth Avenue, Neiman Marcus, Bergdorf Goodman, Nordstrom, Bloomingdale’s
- Middle market/Upscale: Macy's, Von Maur, Dillard's, Belk
- Middle market/Downscale: JCPenney, Boscov's, Kohl's, Sears
- Off-price retailers: Nordstrom Rack, T.J. Maxx, Marshalls, Gabe's, Ross Dress for Less, Saks Off 5th, Bloomingdale’s Outlet, Neiman Marcus Last Call and Burlington are stores that sell designer goods at lower prices, often on a surplus basis.
- Discount stores: Kmart, Meijer, Target, Walmart, Roses

Stores that carry a general line of groceries and other product lines similar to those of department stores are considered warehouse clubs or supercenters. Warehouse clubs require a nominal annual membership fee, while supercenters do not. Costco, BJ's Wholesale Club, and Sam's Club are examples of warehouse clubs.

==== Chicago ====
Marshall Field & Company originated in 1852. It was the premier department store on the main shopping street in the Midwest, State Street in Chicago. Upscale shoppers came by train from throughout the region, patronizing nearby hotels. It grew to become a major chain before converting to the Macy's nameplate on 9 September 2006. Marshall Field's served as a model for other department stores in that it had exceptional customer service. Field's also brought with it the now famous Frango mints brand that became so closely identified with Marshall Field's and Chicago from the now defunct Frederick & Nelson Department store. Marshall Field's also had the firsts; among many innovations by Marshall Field's were the first European buying office, which was located in Manchester, England, and the first bridal registry. The company was the first to introduce the concept of the personal shopper, and that service was provided without charge in every Field's store, until the chain's last days under the Marshall Field's name. It was the first store to offer revolving credit and the first department store to use escalators. Marshall Field's book department in the State Street store was legendary; it pioneered the concept of the "book signing". Moreover, every year at Christmas, Marshall Field's downtown store windows were filled with animated displays as part of the downtown shopping district display; the "theme" window displays became famous for their ingenuity and beauty, and visiting the Marshall Field's windows at Christmas became a tradition for Chicagoans and visitors alike, as popular a local practice as visiting the Walnut Room with its equally famous Christmas tree or meeting "under the clock" on State Street.

The Carson Pirie Scott brand is strongly associated with the historic Carson, Pirie, Scott and Company Building designed by Louis Sullivan. It was built in 1899 for the retail firm Schlesinger & Mayer, and expanded and sold to Carson Pirie Scott in 1904. The building, located on State Street in Chicago's Loop, housed the chain's flagship store for more than a century before closing for good in 2007. Target now occupies the building.

Architecturally, these multifloored "palaces of consumption" often featured ornate cast-iron facades with vast, open interiors. At times they boasted fanciful domes and skylights that flooded the interiors with natural light in the days before electrification. Plate-glass windows on the street level allowed elaborate displays of the treasures within, thus making "window shopping" a new urban leisure activity. Since the store itself was palatial, this focus on display created an atmosphere. It produced the proper environment for purveying goods that were seen as marks of achievement instead of necessities. Everything was ready-made; rather than bolts of cloth, here were racks of dresses. These were items for instant use, for immediate gratification.

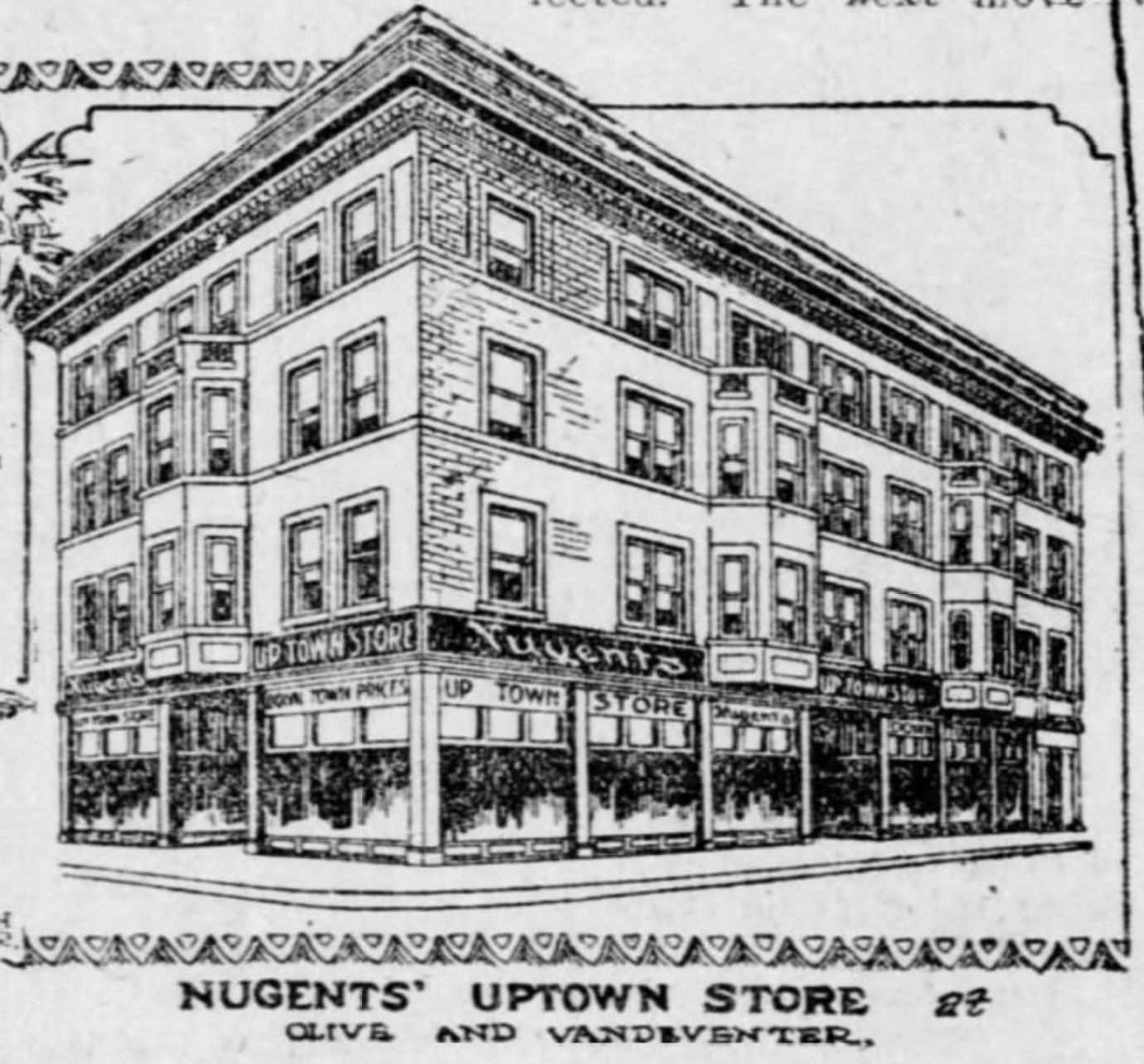
Nugents "Uptown" branch, opened in 1913, the first suburban branch of a U.S. downtown department store

Most major cities had distinctive local department stores, which anchored the downtown shopping district until the arrival of the shopping centres in the 1960s. Washington, for example, after 1887 had Woodward & Lothrop and Garfinckel's starting in 1905. Garfield's went bankrupt in 1990, as did Woodward & Lothrop in 1994. Baltimore had four major department stores: Hutzler's was the prestige leader, followed by Hecht's, Hochschild's and Stewart's. They all operated branches in the suburbs, but all closed in the late twentieth century. By 2015, most locally owned department stores around the country had been consolidated into larger chains, or had closed down entirely.

Suburbanization began in 1913 when Nugents in St. Louis, Missouri, opened a branch store in the then-suburban area of Midtown St. Louis (then called "Uptown"). After that Filene's of Boston opened some boutiques in the early 1920s, and in the late 1920s full-line suburban stores were opened by B. H. Dyas and Bullock's of Los Angeles and Marshall Field of Chicago. 14–15 years before any other U.S. downtown department store did so.

==== Cleveland ====
In the golden age of department store retail, Cleveland's major stores, centered on the city's downtown, extended from Public Square east along Euclid Avenue. They included Higbee's (1860), Bailey's (1899), the May Company (1888), Taylor's (1870), Halle's (1891), and Sterling Lindner Davis (1845), which collectively represented one of the largest and most fashionable shopping districts in the country, often compared to New York's Fifth Avenue.

==== Detroit ====
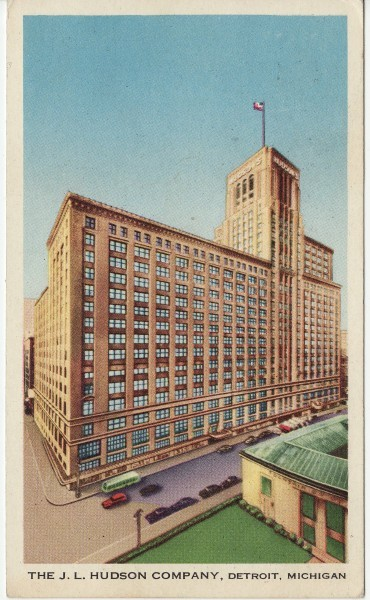
Hudson department store in Detroit in 1951; it opened in 1911, closed in 1986 and was torn down in 1998

In 1881, Joseph Lowthian Hudson opened a small men's clothing store in Detroit. After 10 years he had eight stores in the midwest and was the most profitable clothing retailer in the country. In 1893, he began construction of J. L. Hudson Department Store at Gratiot and Farmer Streets in Detroit. The store grew over the years and a 25-story tower was added in 1928. The final section was a 12-story addition in 1946, giving the entire complex 49 acres (20 ha) of floor space.

After World War II Hudson's realized that the limited parking space at its downtown skyscraper would increasingly be a problem for its customers. The solution in 1954 was to open the Northland Center in nearby Southfield, just beyond the city limits. It was the largest suburban shopping center in the world, and quickly became the main shopping destination for northern and western Detroit, and for much of the suburbs. By 1961 the downtown skyscraper accounted for only half of Hudson's sales; it closed in 1983. The Northland Center Hudson's, rebranded Macy's in 2006 following acquisition by Federated Department Stores, was closed along with the remaining stores in the center in March 2015 due to the center's high storefront vacancy, decaying infrastructure, and financial mismanagement.

In 1969 Hudson's merged with the Dayton's to create Dayton-Hudson Corporation headquartered in Minneapolis.

==== Minneapolis ====
George Dayton had founded his Dayton's Dry Goods store in Minneapolis in 1902 and the AMC cooperative in 1912. His descendants built Southdale Center in 1956, opened the Target discount store chain in 1962 and the B. Dalton Bookseller chain in 1966. Dayton's grew to 19 stores under the Dayton's name plus five other regional names acquired by Dayton-Hudson. The Dayton-Hudson Corporation closed the flagship J. L. Hudson Department Store in downtown Detroit in 1983, but expanded its other retail operations. It acquired Mervyn's in 1978, Marshall Field's in 1990, and renamed itself the Target Corporation in 2000. In 2002, Dayton's and Hudson's were consolidated into the Marshall Field's name. In 2005, May Department Stores acquired all of the Marshall Field's stores and shortly thereafter, Macy's acquired May.

==== New York City ====
Arnold Constable was the first American department store. It was founded in 1825 by Aaron Arnold (1794?–1876), an emigrant from Great Britain, as a small dry goods store on Pine Street in New York City. In 1857 the store moved into a five-story white marble dry goods palace known as the Marble House. During the Civil War, Arnold Constable was one of the first stores to issue charge bills of credit to its customers each month instead of on a bi-annual basis. Recognized as an emporium for high-quality fashions, the store soon outgrew the Marble House and erected a cast-iron building on Broadway and Nineteenth Street in 1869; this "Palace of Trade" expanded over the years until it was necessary to move into a larger space in 1914. In 1925, Arnold, Constable merged with Stewart & Company and expanded into the suburbs, first with a 1937 store in New Rochelle, New York and later in Hempstead and Manhasset on Long Island, and in New Jersey. Financial problems led to bankruptcy in 1975.

In New York City in 1846, Alexander Turney Stewart established the "Marble Palace" on Broadway, between Chambers and Reade streets. He offered European retail merchandise at fixed prices on a variety of dry goods, and advertised a policy of providing "free entrance" to all potential customers. Though it was clad in white marble to look like a Renaissance palazzo, the building's cast iron construction permitted large plate glass windows that permitted major seasonal displays, especially in the Christmas shopping season. In 1862, Stewart built a new store on a full city block uptown between 9th and 10th streets, with eight floors and nineteen departments of dress goods and furnishing materials, carpets, glass and china, toys and sports equipment, ranged around a central glass-covered court. His innovations included buying from manufacturers for cash and in large quantities, keeping his markup small and prices low, truthful presentation of merchandise, the one-price policy (so there was no haggling), simple merchandise returns and cash refund policy, selling for cash and not credit, buyers who searched worldwide for quality merchandise, departmentalization, vertical and horizontal integration, volume sales, and free services for customers such as waiting rooms and free delivery of purchases. His innovations were quickly copied by other department stores.

In 1858, Rowland Hussey Macy founded Macy's as a dry goods store. B. Altman and Company and Lord & Taylor soon competed with Stewart as New York's earliest department stores, followed by McCreery's and Brooklyn's Abraham & Straus. The Straus family would be in the management of both Macy's and A&S.

By the 1880s New York's retail center had moved uptown, forming a stretch of retail shopping northward from 9th Street: the "Ladies' Mile". By 1894, the major stores competed in the Christmas season with elaborate Christmas window displays; in 1895 Macy's featured 13 tableaux, including scenes from "Jack and the Beanstalk", Gulliver's Travels and other children's favorites.

==== Philadelphia ====
In 1877, John Wanamaker opened the United States' first modern department store in a former Pennsylvania Railroad freight terminal in Philadelphia. Wanamaker's was the first department store to offer fixed prices marked on every article and also introduced electrical illumination (1878), the telephone (1879), and the use of pneumatic tubes to transport cash and documents (1880) to the department store business. Subsequent department stores founded in Philadelphia included Strawbridge and Clothier, Gimbels, Lit Brothers, and Snellenbergs.

==== Pittsburgh ====
In 1849, Horne's began operations and soon became a leading Pittsburgh department store. In 1879, it opened a seven-story landmark which was the first department store in the city's downtown. In 1972, Associated Dry Goods acquired Horne's, and ADG expanded operations of Horne's to several stores in suburban centers throughout the Pittsburgh region as well as in Erie, Pennsylvania and Northeast Ohio. In December 1986, Horne's was acquired by a local investor group following ADG's acquisition by May Department Stores. By 1994, Federated Department Stores acquired the remaining ten Horne's stores and merged them with its Lazarus division, completely ceasing all operations of any store under the Horne's name.

Kaufmann's was founded in Pittsburgh in 1871 by Jacob and Isaac Kaufmann. In 1877, the brothers moved downtown to a location that became known as The Big Store. "The Big Store" featured a large landmark outdoor clock that became a popular meeting place and city icon.

==== Salt Lake City ====
On 1 March 1869, Zion's Cooperative Mercantile Institution opened in Salt Lake City as a new community store that became the first incorporated department store in America in 1870. A new 3-story brick and iron store was built in 1876, noted for its unique architecture and striped awnings. This store was replaced by an enclosed shopping center in 1973, and the new Zion department store preserved the gilt-edged ornate facade of the old structure.

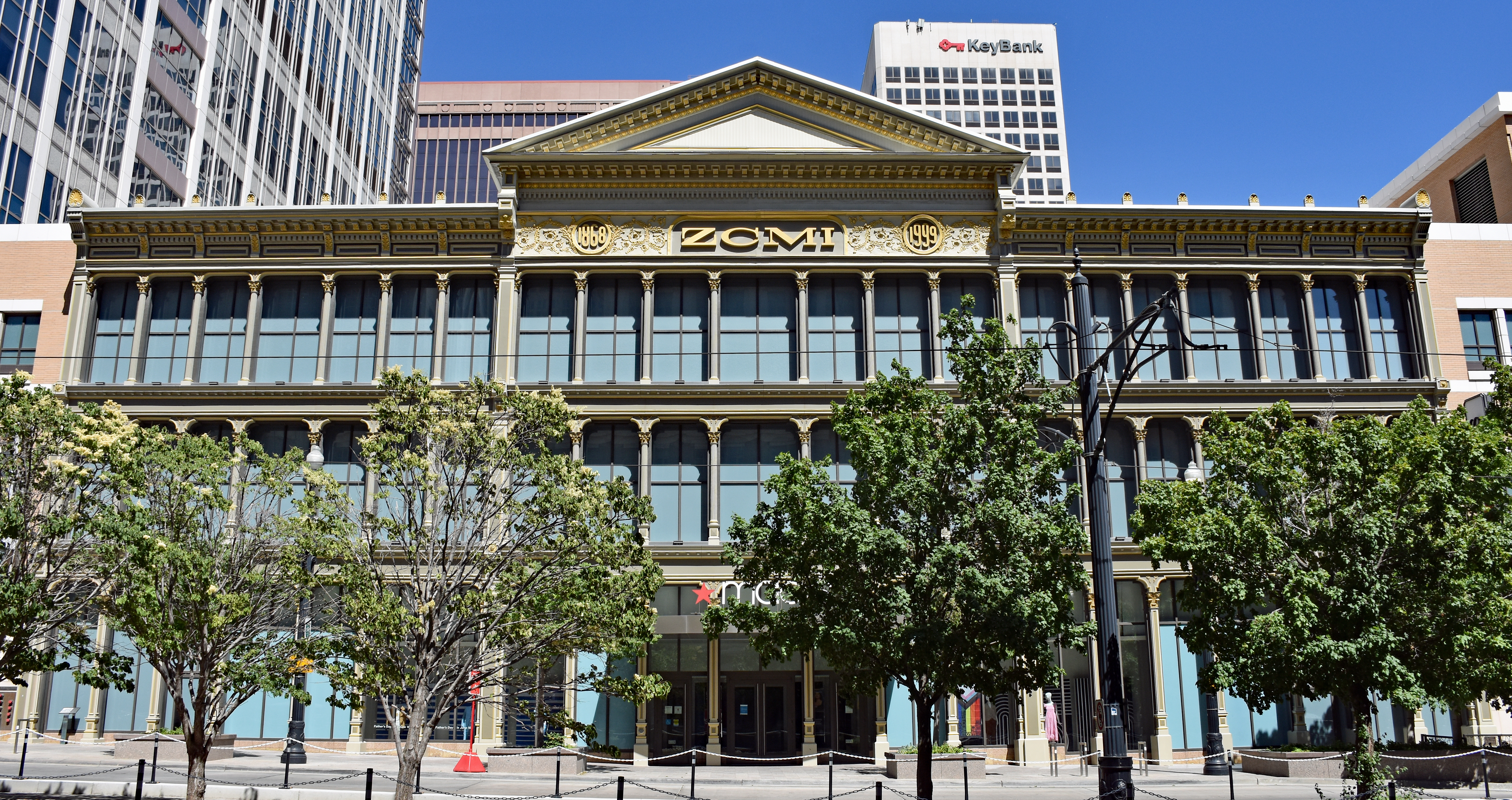
The historic ZCMI Cast Iron Front

In 1999, the May Department Stores bought the 14-store ZCMI chain and rebranded it as "Meier & Frank", a May property with eight stores in Oregon and Washington. Subsequently, May Department Stores completed a merger with Federated Department Stores and the Meier & Frank brand ZCMI stores became Macy's stores, effective late 2006.

The original facade of the ZCMI store was again preserved during the late 2000s construction of City Creek Center. The original plans removed the facade however public outcry persuaded the retaining of the beautiful historic architecture. The facade can still be seen along Main Street.

=== Venezuela ===
In Venezuela the biggest chains are Beco and Traki. The American Sears also used to operate in Venezuela from 1950 to 1983 and peaked at nine locations nationwide.

== Asia ==
=== China ===
Since the opening policy in 1979, the Chinese department stores also develops swiftly along with the fast-growing economy. There are different department store groups dominating different regions. For example, INTIME department store has the biggest market presence in Zhejiang province, while Jinying department stores dominate Jiangsu Province. There are many other department store groups, such as Pacific, Parkson, Wangfujing, and New World, many of which are expanding quickly by listing in the financial market.

==== Hong Kong ====
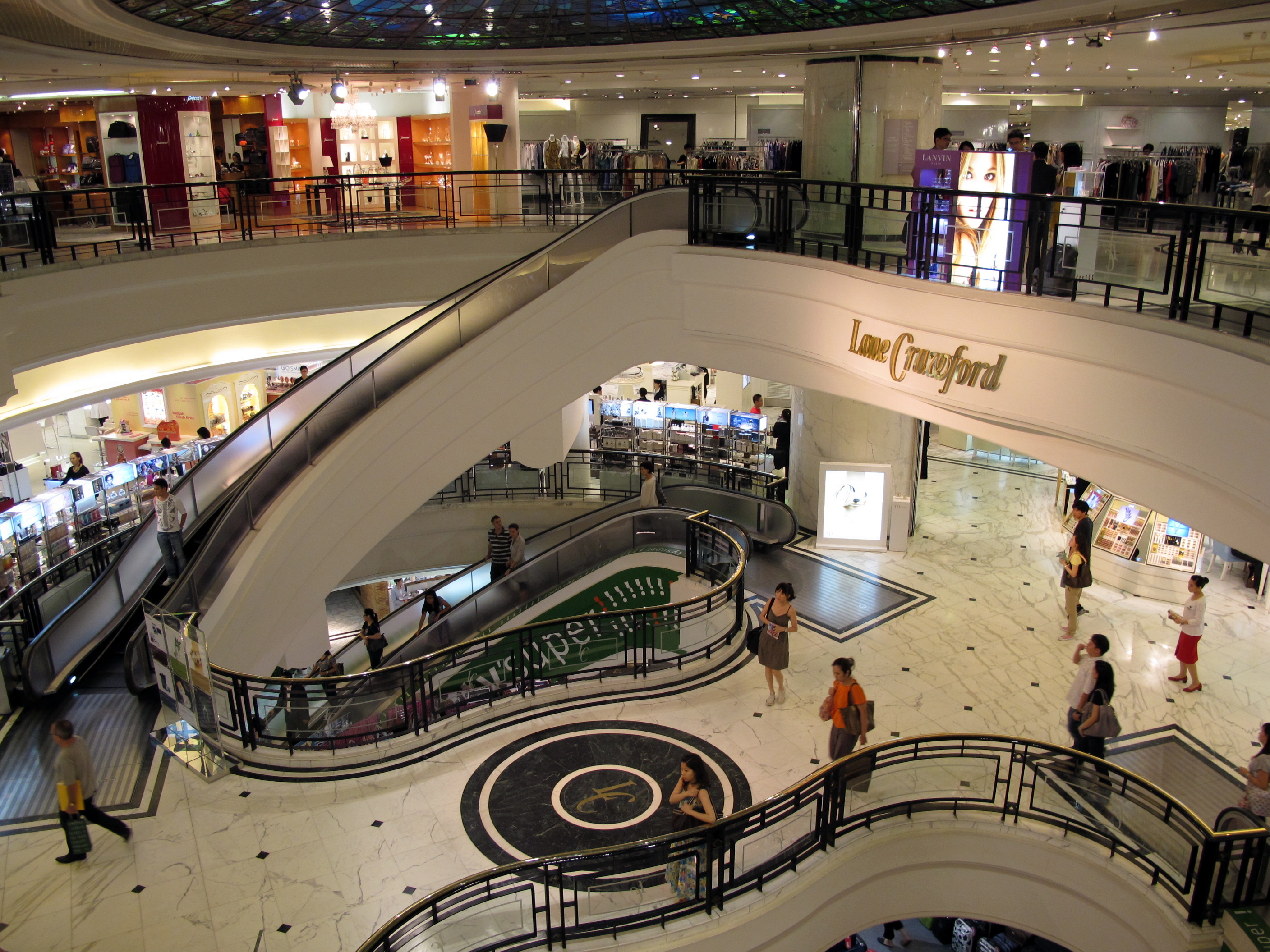
Lane Crawford store in Time Square sandals, Causeway Bay

The first department store, Lane Crawford, was opened in 1850 by Scots Thomas Ash Lane and Ninian Crawford on Des Voeux Road, Hong Kong Island. At the beginning, the store mainly catered to visiting ships' crews as well as Royal Navy staff and their families. In 1900, the first ethnic-Chinese owned Sincere Department Store was opened by Ma Ying Piu, who returned from Australia and inspired by David Jones. In 1907, another former Hong Kong expatriate in Australia, the Kwoks family, returned to Hong Kong and founded Wing On.

Since the 1960s, a number of Japanese owned department stores started to enter the Hong Kong market. Daimaru was opened in the corner of Great George Street and Paterson Street in 1960, followed by Matsuzakaya, Isetan, Seibu, Sogo and Yaohan. Yaohan was taken over by Jusco in the 1990s and later became ÆON. Currently, out of all Japanese department store brands that entered Hong Kong, only Sogo and ÆON survived while others have pulled out.

=== Cyprus ===
The most famous department store chain in Cyprus was Debenhams (formerly Woolworth). This was operated on a franchise basis by the Shakolas Group until 2020, when the Debenhams stores were renamed to ERA department stores.

=== India ===
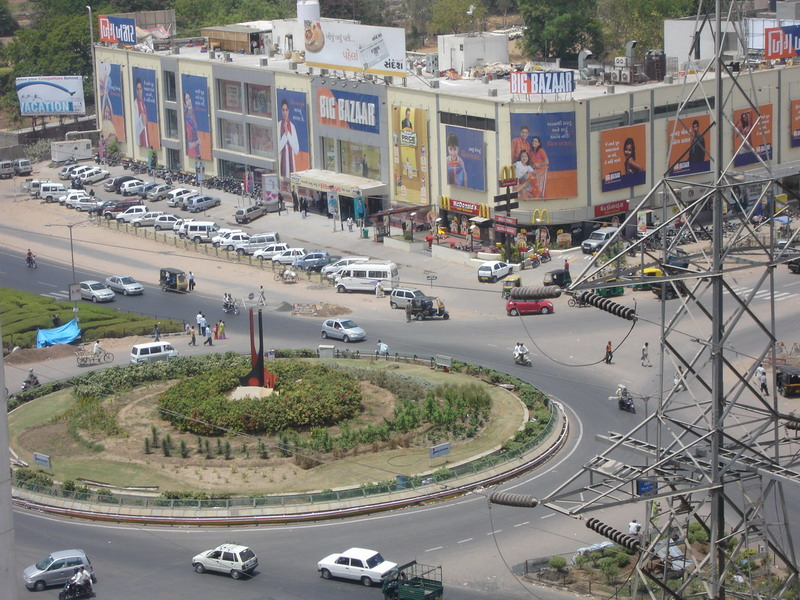
Big Bazaar, Ranga Store along with a McDonald's restaurant at Ahmedabad, India

In India, companies like Smart Bazaar, Shopper's Stop, Kingsberry, Pantaloon, and D-Mart are entering into retail.

Small-time department stores – or convenience shops as they are better known in most western countries – are also upcoming. Although these stores are much bigger in size than a usual-size convenience shop in, for example, the US, they are much smaller than a regular-sized department store. Examples include 1-India Family Mart, Sabka Bazaar, Big Apple, Spencer's and Dailymart.

=== Indonesia ===
One of the earliest department store established in the modern day region of Indonesia was the Tio Tek Hong store, established in 1902 by the prominent Chinese–Indonesian businessman Tio Tek Hong (1877–1965).

Indonesia's largest department store chain is Ramayana with over ninety branches across the country. The same group also operates under Robinson (not related to Robinsons and Co from Singapore and Central Department Store's Robinson from Thailand) and Cahaya, all targeting the lower-income sectors. Other local department stores positioned for the lower-middle segment are CT Corp-owned Transmart and Lippo Group-owned Matahari.

Lippo Group's Matahari previously managed to trade under Mega M, Galeria, and Parisian brands, all of which have been progressively closed. Lippo acquired Matahari Department Store from its founder Hari Darmawan in 1996, and sits as President Director of the company until 2001. Lippo previously owned a franchise of Walmart (hypermarket) and J.C. Penney before both brands pulling out during 1997–1998 Asian economic crisis.

Meanwhile, Transmart Department Store is established after CT Corp acquired Carrefour hypermarket in 2011. The department store itself has 24 branches nationwide as of 2017 and plans to expand as part of Transmart's expansion plan. The company also owned 50% ownership of Metro Department Store in Indonesia, targeting the middle-up segment with 10 branches nationwide. Metro entered Indonesia in 1991, opening its first store at Pondok Indah Mall. CT Corp's partnership with Metro starts when Metro opened its third store at Trans Studio Mall Bandung, previously known Bandung Supermall, before finally acquiring Metro Indonesia's 40% stake in 2008, and another 10% in 2010. In 2019, Metro Singapore announced that its stake in Metro Indonesia have been divested and sold to CT Corp. In return, Metro Singapore granted CT Corp and Metro Indonesia permission to use its "Metro" trademarks in return for a fee payable to Metro Singapore.

Another middle-up segment competitor besides Metro Department Store is Sogo Department Store from Japan, established in the 1990s at Plaza Indonesia and Mal Kelapa Gading before Plaza Indonesia branch's closure in 2007. The year 2007 also saw the re-opening of Jakarta's Seibu Department Store at Jakarta shopping mall Grand Indonesia, poised to be the largest and second most upscale department store in Indonesia after Harvey Nichols; the latter closed in 2010 and plans to return. Other international department stores include Debenhams and Galeries Lafayette. Debenhams opened its doors at Plaza Indonesia in 2003 before expanding to Senayan City in 2005, Supermall Karawaci in 2008, and Lippo Mall Kemang in 2012, before all branches (Debenhams pulled out of Plaza Indonesia in 2008) eventually closed in 2017. while the latter joined the Indonesian market in 2013 inside Pacific Place Mall, targeting the middle-up market with a price range from affordable to luxury, and is poised to be the largest upscale department store. Galeries Lafayette, Debenhams, Harvey Nichols, Seibu and Sogo are all operated by PT. Mitra Adiperkasa, In 2021, a second Seibu store was opened at Pondok Indah Mall occupying the first ground floor.

Central Group from Thailand entered Indonesia in 2014 replacing Harvey Nichols at Grand Indonesia, bringing its flagship Central brand. Its entry gained success in the Indonesian market by bringing Thailand-based fashion and living brands. Parkson, Lotte, and AEON also entered Indonesia in the 2010s.

Parkson acquired the local brand Centro Department Store in 2011. Centro still operates for middle market while the Parkson brand itself, positioned for middle-up segment, entered in 2014 by opening its first store in Medan, followed by its second and third store in Jakarta and Yogyakarta. Operators of Parkson and Centro department stores, PT. Tozy Sentosa, was sued by suppliers due to failed payments to various vendors. The company was officially declared bankrupt by court on 17 May 2021.

Lotte, meanwhile, entered the market by inking a partnership with Ciputra Group, creating what is called 'Lotte Shopping Avenue' inside the Ciputra World Jakarta complex, as well as acquiring Makro and rebranding it into Lotte Mart for hypermarket business and Lotte Grosir (previously Lotte Mart Wholesale) for wholesale business. As of 2017, Lotte Department Store is not expanding despite the company plans to open 5 more stores.

AEON also inked a partnership with Sinarmas Land, opened its flagship store inside its AEON Mall in Sinar Mas Land's flagship BSD City on 30 May 2015. AEON recently opened its second branch at Jakarta Garden City in September 2017. Plans to open AEON Mall and its AEON Department Store in Sentul City, Kota Deltamas, and Jakarta's Southgate complex have been announced. AEON Mall's BSD City, Deltamas and Southgate branches are opened under AEON and Sinarmas Land's partnership while Sentul City and Jakarta Garden City branches are not affiliated with the AEON-Sinarmas partnership, therefore managed independently by AEON and other partners. AEON Department Store, however, was operated by AEON solely.

Other local department store brands include STAR Department Store, Rambla, Citrus, Barata, Gardena, Suzuya Department Store, JM Department Store, Java/Lotus (PT. Mitra Adiperkasa's low-end dept store brand, now closed), the Grand Palace, Yogya, Borobudur, Lima Cahaya, Chandra Department Store, Keris Gallery, Pojok Busana, Surya, Pasaraya and Indonesia's oldest department store Sarinah, which opened in 1963.

=== Iran ===
Iran's largest department store chain is Shahrvand with 31 stores, all located in Tehran. The other department store that has been established lately is Hyperstar that invested by Carrefour's license holder, Majid Al Futtaim Group, in Tehran, Shiraz and Isfahan.

=== Israel ===
The oldest and largest department store chain in Israel is Hamashbir Lazarchan.

=== Japan ===
Some of the largest department stores in Japan are Daimaru (J. Front Retailing), Hankyu (H_{2}O Retailing), Hanshin (H_{2}O Retailing), Isetan (Isetan Mitsukoshi Holdings), Matsuzakaya (J. Front Retailing), Mitsukoshi (Isetan Mitsukoshi Holdings), Seibu (7&i Holdings), Sogo (7&i Holdings), Takashimaya, ÆON, Tobu, Tokyu, Odakyu, Matsuya and Marui. Many are owned and operated in conjunction with private railway companies. Recently, business integration has been successive.

=== Kuwait ===
One of the oldest and biggest department stores in Kuwait is Union Trading Company, also known as UTC. It operates 17 retail outlets across the country and offers a wide selection of imported international brands in fashion and apparel, perfumery, cosmetics, accessories, housewares, electronics, appliances and food. Recently one of the most well known high-end clothing department stores in Kuwait is Villa Moda. Co-op society stores are department stores put up by the government.

=== Lebanon ===
The history of department stores in Lebanon dates back to 1900 when Orozdi-Back, a department store that was founded by a French businessman of Hungarian origin, opened a branch in Beirut. By the mid-twentieth century, Beirut had become the luxury department store of the Near East.

Beirut remains a shopping magnet in the region, with shoppers from neighboring Levantine countries heading to Beirut to shop.

Department stores in Lebanon include today ABC Group, The Sultan Center, Aïshti and Spinneys.

=== Malaysia ===
In Malaysia, companies such as AEON, Metrojaya, Isetan, Parkson, Sogo, The Store (and subsidiaries Pacific and Milimewa), Marks & Spencer, Robinsons, Debenhams, and Tangs are considered department stores, while retail brands such as Tesco, LuLu and Giant are discount department stores combined with supermarkets, commonly known as hypermarkets. AEON, Isetan and The Store (and subsidiaries Pacific and Milimewa) also includes supermarket under their brands. The Store is the first department store in Malaysia, as it opens in 1968 at Bukit Mejaram, Penang, followed by Parkson's establishment in 1987 at Sungei Wang Plaza. As of 2021, The Store so far has the most stores in the country, with 49 branches (not including subsidiaries Pacific (10 branches) and Milimewa (15 branches, all in Sabah)), followed by Parkson with 41 branches, AEON with 34 stores, Debenhams with 2 stores, Isetan with 4 stores and Metrojaya with 3 stores. Robinsons and Tangs withdraws from Malaysian market in 2020, with the former withdrawing as the company liquidates.

=== Nepal ===
Bluebird is the first department store in Nepal and BhatBhateni is currently the largest chain of department stores, with several stores all over the country.

=== Pakistan ===
Lahore boasts H. Karim Buksh, Jalal sons and Potpourri stores with branches throughout the cities' commercial areas. Many urban centers of Pakistan now have Metro Cash, Carry or Carrefour, Chase, and Imtiaz stores.

=== Philippines ===
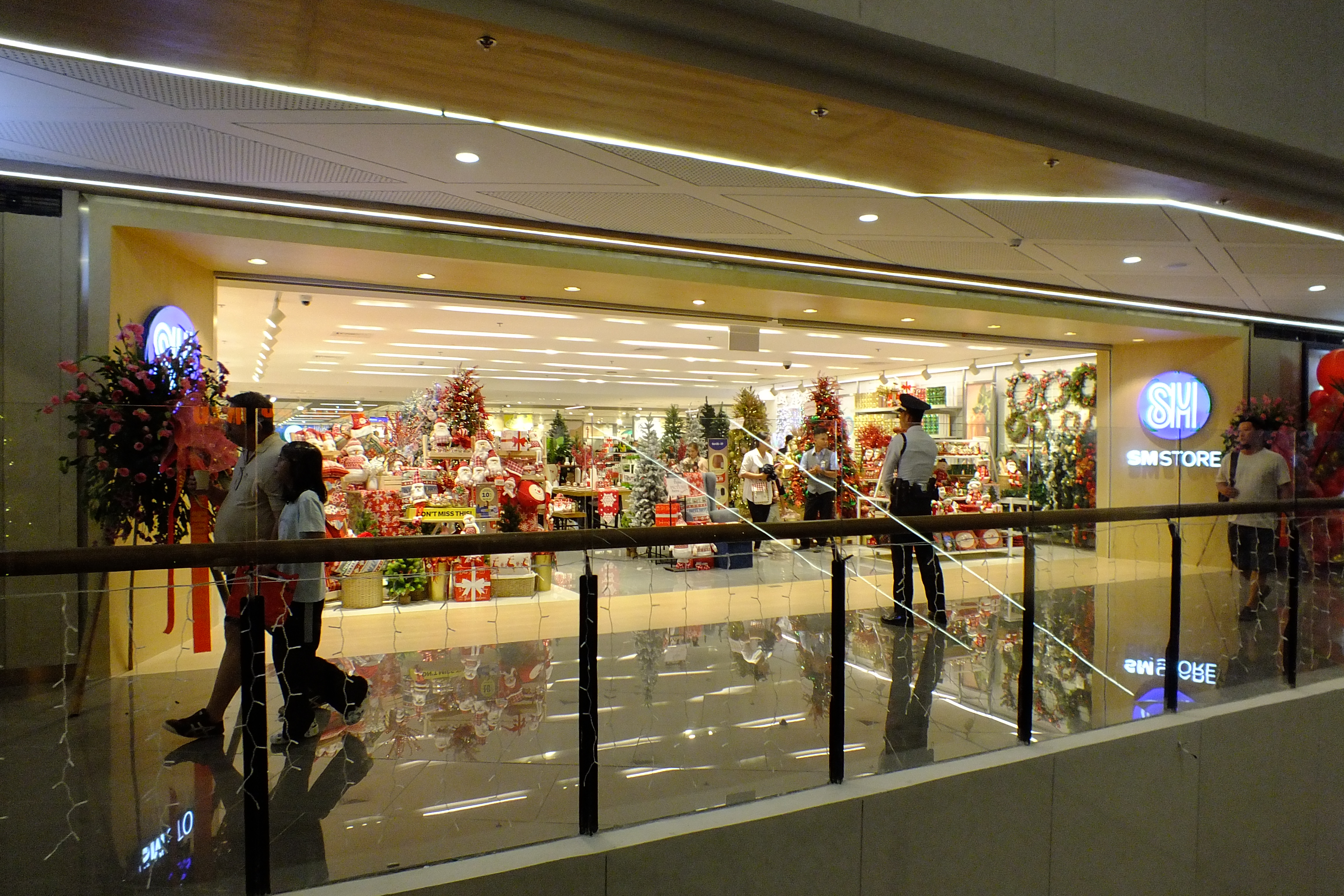
The SM Department Store became one of the top retail centers in the Philippines.

The first department store in the Philippines is the Hoskyn's Department Store of Hoskyn & Co. established in 1877 in Iloilo City by the Englishman Henry Hoskyn, nephew of Nicholas Loney, the first British vice-consul in Iloilo, together with his brothers Herbert Peter and Franklin. The department store is located on Calle Real and is also claimed to be the first to introduce the "fixed price" policy in merchandising in the country and was known to be "the store that sold everything from needle to anchor." It offered groceries, hardware, stationery, toys, watches, jewelry, machinery, buttons, threads etc.

Some of the other earliest department stores in the Philippines were located in Manila as early as 1898 with the opening of the American Bazaar, which was later named Beck's. During the course of the American occupation of the Philippines, many department stores were built throughout the city, many of which were located on Escolta Street. Heacock's, a luxury department store, was considered as the best department store in the Orient. Other department stores included Aguinaldo's, La Puerta del Sol, Estrella del Norte, and the Crystal Arcade, all of which were destroyed during the Battle of Manila in 1945. After the war, department stores were once again alive with the establishment of Shoemart (now SM), and Rustan's. Since the foundation of these companies in the 1950s, there are now more than one hundred department stores to date. At present, due to the huge success of shopping centres, department stores in the Philippines usually are anchor tenants within centres. SM Supermalls and Robinsons Malls are two of the country's most prominent shopping centre chains, all of which have department store sections.

=== Qatar ===
The only department stores in Qatar are the French Galeries Lafayette and Printemps with one store each both in Doha. Galeries Lafayette opened in 2019 at the 21 High Street shopping mall under a franchise agreement with the Ali Bin Ali Group. Whilst Printemps opened in November 2022 at Doha Oasis and is the largest department store in the Middle East.

=== Singapore ===
The most well-known department stores in Singapore are BHG (formerly known as Seiyu), Isetan, Marks & Spencer, Metro, Mustafa, OG, Takashimaya and Tangs.

With the onset of the COVID-19 pandemic; OG will continue to remain its presence at Albert Street and Chinatown. BHG Seletar Mall, Robinsons (all of them), BHG Lot One, BHG Clementi Mall, BHG Jurong Point, OG Orchard, BHG Junction 8, Isetan Parkway Parade, Isetan Westgate, Isetan NEX, Metro Causeway Point, Metro Paragon and Isetan Tampines were all closed down. All of the department stores in Singapore are facing closures (except flagship BHG at Bugis, Isetan at Scotts, Takashimaya, 2 OG stores and 2 Tangs stores) due to high rent and e-commerce, where it will be phasing out to make way for newer store technology which is Shopee and Lazada.

As of April 2026, Marks & Spencer have the most stores in Singapore with 6 branches in total (1 branch in One Raffles is dedicated to food only), Metro, OG and Tangs with 2 stores, and BHG, Isetan, Takashimaya and Mustafa with only 1 store each.

=== South Korea ===
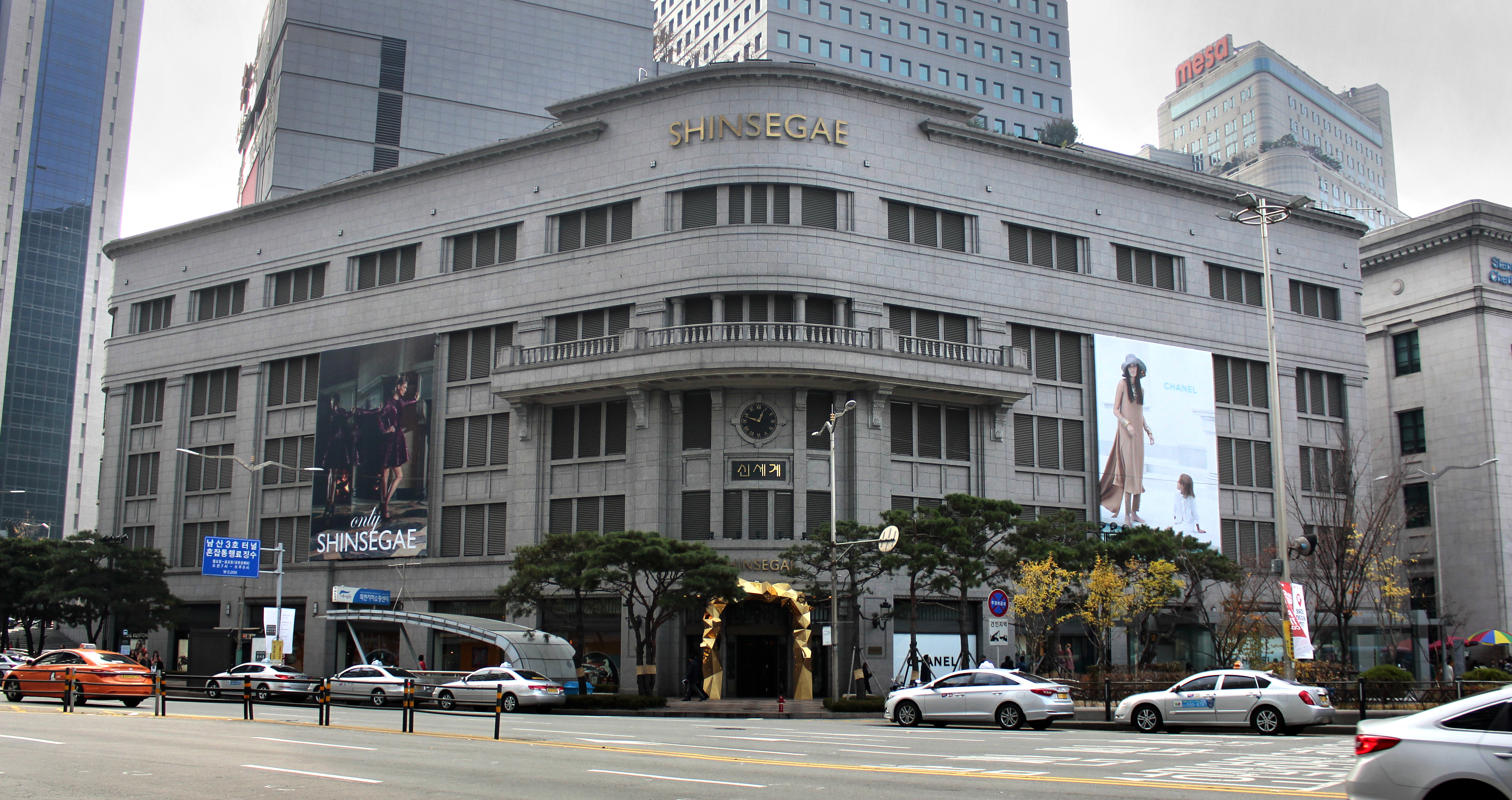
Shinsegae Department Store in Seoul

'Hwashin Sanghoe (literally "Hwashin Store"), in downtown Seoul, was considered as first department store in Korea.

The five most prevalent chains are Lotte, Hyundai, Shinsegae, Galleria, and AK Plaza. Lotte Department Store is the largest, operating more than 60 stores (including Lotte Outlets, Young Plazas, and foreign branches). Hyundai Department Store has about 19 stores (15 department, 4 outlet), and there are 13 stores in Shinsegae. Shinsegae has three outlet stores with Simon. Galleria has five, and AK has five stores. These five department stores are known as giant retailers in South Korea. From fashion items to electric appliances, people can buy various kinds of products. Every weekend, people are fond of going around these department stores, because their locations are usually easy to visit.

As of 2010 the Shinsegae department store in Centum City, Busan, is the largest department store in the world.

=== Sri Lanka ===
In Sri Lanka there are few department stores. Most are based on Colombo, the country's capital. Notable department stores are Odel, the Food City chain by Cargills (Ceylon) PLC and the Arpico Super Centre operated by David Pieris & Co.

=== Taiwan ===
Notable department store chains in Taiwan include Breeze (eight branches), Shin Kong Mitsukoshi (13 branches), Far Eastern Department Stores (10 branches), Far East Sogo (nine branches), Uni-Ustyle Department Store (formerly Uni-President Hankyu) (two branches), Pacific Department Store (two branches in Taichung and Pingtung), Dayeh Takashimaya (one branch), Ming Yao Department Store (one branch) and Chungyo Department Store (one branch, Taichung local).

Shin Kong Mitsukoshi, Pacific Sogo and Dayeh Takashimaya were established as joint ventures between Taiwanese companies and Japanese department store chains. Uni-President Hankyu was replaced by Uni-Ustyle in 2016 due to expiration of the contract on March 2 that year, while Takashimaya sold its 50% stake in Dayeh Takashimaya, thus leading to company's withdrawal despite the name 'Takashimaya' is still used to this day.

=== Thailand ===
Two of the central department stores are Central Chidlom, the oldest in Thailand, having been established in 1947, and Siam Center, which opened in 1973, currently known to be one of the oldest shopping malls in Bangkok, Thailand.

The most popular department store in Thailand is the Central Department Store, which is managed by Central Group. The group also manages Robinsons Department Store (which targets middle market) and did own Zen, which was folded into Central in 2019. Central once expanded the 'Zen' brand into China but those stores have been closed down since 2013.

- Central Department Store – 24 branches (2023)
  - Robinson Department Store – 54 branches (2023)
- The Center – one branch (a division of Lotus's) (2010)
- Diana Department Store – three branches (2010)
- The Mall Group – nine branches (2010)
  - Emporium Department Store (located in Emporium Shopping Mall) (2010)
  - Paragon Department Store (located in Siam Paragon, JV partnership with Siam Paragon mall operator Siam Piwat) (2010)
  - BLÚPORT Department Store (located in BLÚPORT Mall, Hua Hin) (2014)
  - BLÚPEARL Department Store (located in BLÚPEARL Mall, Phuket, currently under construction)
- Siam Takashimaya – one branch (located in Iconsiam) (2018)

Closed

- Tokyu – Branch store of the Japanese company, last store in MBK Center was closed in 2021.

=== Turkey ===
Department stores are mostly located inside the shopping malls. Boyner and Özdilek are the more popular middle class department stores in Turkey. Most Boyner stores are located inside the malls except a few ones and Özdilek generally builds its own shopping center with smaller retailers surrounding the store.

Beymen and Vakko are the most popular two high-end department stores in Turkey. Marks & Spencer has a few branches and Harvey Nichols has one branch located in Istanbul. Debenhams used to have two branches in Istanbul but they closed both stores by the end of 2017. Recently a branch of Galeries Lafayette opened up in Istanbul.

=== United Arab Emirates ===
==== Operating ====
British department store chain Harvey Nichols opened at the Mall of the Emirates in 2006 and is operated under licence by the Al Tayer Group. The store was originally planned to open in Autumn 2005. In 2007, the French department store Galeries Lafayette opened a store at the Dubai Mall. Other stores include Jashanmal (Since 1956), Marks & Spencer (Since 1998), Bloomingdales (Since 2010), and Debenhams.

==== Defunct ====
In 1992 BHS (British Home Stores) opened a store in Dubai. In 2016 after the British operations of BHS collapsed Al Maya Group (licence owner in Dubai and Sharjah) announced that the 5 stores (Dubai Mall, Dubai Festival City, Al Ghurair Centre, Lamcy Plaza, Sharjah City Centre) would close by the end of the year. Ran by Liwa Trading Enterprises stores also once operated in Abu Dhabi. The American chain Saks Fifth Avenue opened a store at BurJuman Centre opened in 2005, however it closed in 2016. A menswear store also operated on Jumeriah Road which was closed in 2010.

In October 2013 House of Fraser opened a store at Abu Dhabi's World Trade Centre followed by a store at Yas Mall in 2015 however in 2016 the original store was closed. The Yas Mall store has also now closed. Le BHV Marias (at the time owned by Groupe Galeries Lafayette) opened in 2017 at City Walk Dubai but is now closed. The store was over 6,000 square metres and designed by Kristina Zanic. Other now defunct stores include Woolworths and Paris Gallery.

== Europe ==
=== Austria ===
Kastner & Öhler is a chain of department stores based in Graz. The company was the first in central Europe to introduce fixed prices and mail order.

=== Czech Republic ===
The three main historical department stores in Prague are Bílá labuť, Kotva, and Máj (now Tesco).

=== Denmark ===
In Denmark there are three department store chains: Magasin (1868), Illum (1891), and Salling (1906). Magasin is by far the largest, with seven stores all over the country, with the flagship store being Magasin du Nord on Kongens Nytorv in Copenhagen. Illum's only store on Amagertorv in Copenhagen has the appearance of a department store with 20% run by Magasin, but has individual shop owners making it a shopping centre. However, in people's minds, it remains a department store. Salling has two stores in Jutland with one of these being the reason for the closure of a Magasin store due to the competition.

=== France ===
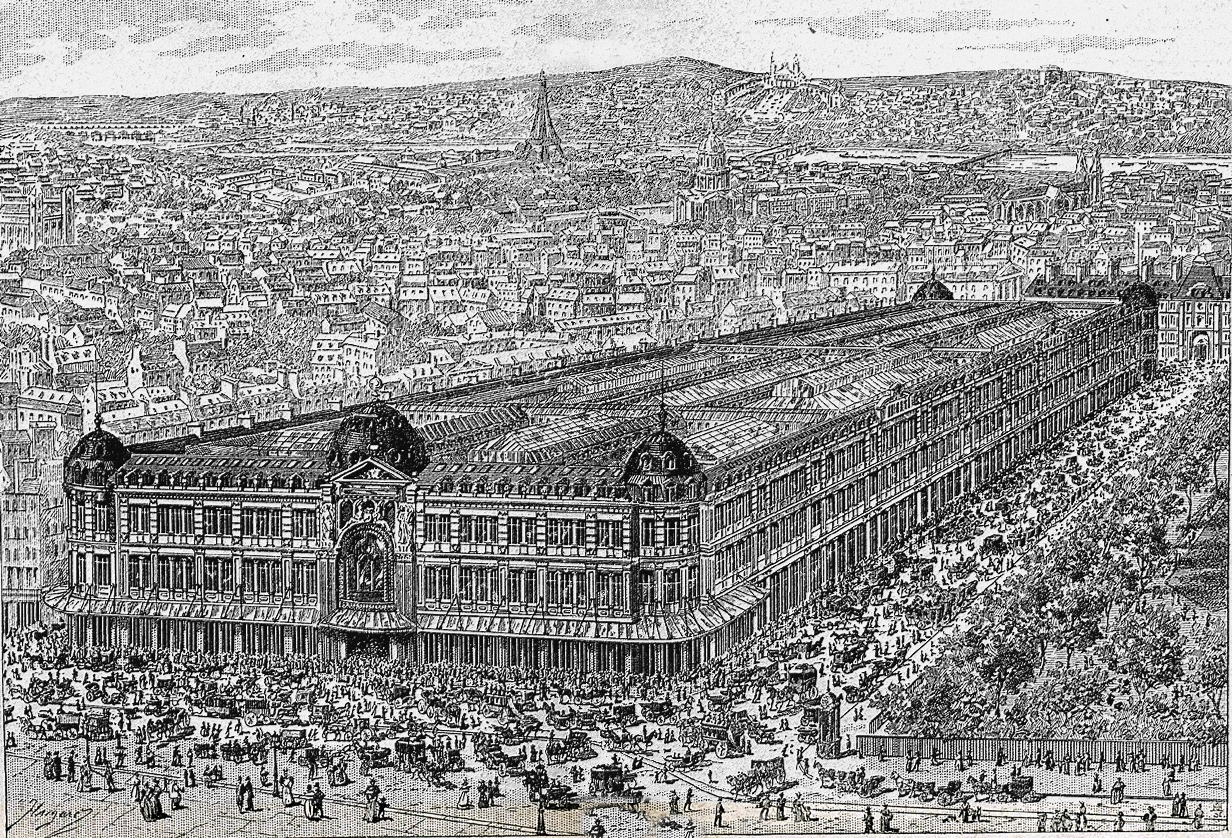
Au Bon Marché

The Paris department store had its roots in the magasin de nouveautés, or novelty store; the first, the Tapis Rouge, was created in 1784. They flourished in the early 19th century, with La Belle Jardinière (1824), Aux Trois Quartiers (1829), and Le Petit Saint Thomas (1830). Balzac described their functioning in his novel César Birotteau. In the 1840s, with the arrival of the railroads in Paris and the increased number of shoppers they brought, they grew in size, and began to have large plate glass display windows, fixed prices and price tags, and advertising in newspapers.

A novelty shop called Au Bon Marché had been founded in Paris in 1838 to sell lace, ribbons, sheets, mattresses, buttons, umbrellas and other assorted goods. It originally had four departments, twelve employees, and a floor space of three hundred meters. The entrepreneur Aristide Boucicaut became a partner in 1852, and changed the marketing plan, instituting fixed prices and guarantees that allowed exchanges and refunds, advertising, and a much wider variety of merchandise. The annual income of the store increased from 500,000 francs in 1852 to five million in 1860. In 1869 he built much larger building at 24 rue de Sèvres on the Left Bank, and enlarged the store again in 1872, with help from the engineering firm of Gustave Eiffel, creator of the Eiffel Tower. The income rose from twenty million francs in 1870 to 72 million at the time of the Boucicaut's death in 1877. The floor space had increased from three hundred square meters in 1838 to fifty thousand, and the number of employees had increased from twelve in 1838 to 1788 in 1879. Boucicaut was famous for his marketing innovations; a reading room for husbands while their wives shopped; extensive newspaper advertising; entertainment for children; and six million catalogs sent out to customers. By 1880 half the employees were women; unmarried women employees lived in dormitories on the upper floors.

Au Bon Marché soon had competitors. Printemps was founded in 1865; La Samaritaine was founded in 1869 by Ernest Cognacq and Marie-Louise Jay, a new Tapis Rouge in 1867, La Ville de Saint-Denis, with the first elevator in France (1869); La Paix; Les Nouvelles Galeries; Grands Magasins Dufayel (1890); the Bazar de l'Hôtel de Ville; and Galeries Lafayette, founded by Alphonse Kahn in 1895.

The French gloried in the national prestige brought by the great Parisian stores. The great writer Émile Zola (1840–1902) set his novel Au Bonheur des Dames (1882–83) in the typical department store. Zola represented it as a symbol of the new technology that was both improving society and devouring it. The novel describes merchandising, management techniques, marketing, and consumerism.

The Grands Magasins Dufayel was a large department store built in 1890 in the northern part of Paris, offering goods at accessible prices to a predominately working-class clientele. Located in a neighborhood with few public spaces, it functioned as a commercial gathering place for the local community. The store encouraged workers to engage with shopping as a social activity, drawing on practices more commonly associated with the established department stores of the central city. Like the bourgeois stores, it helped transform consumption from a business transaction into a direct relationship between consumer and sought-after goods. Its advertisements promised the opportunity to participate in the newest, most fashionable consumerism at reasonable cost. The latest technology was featured, such as cinemas and exhibits of inventions like X-ray machines (that could be used to fit shoes) and the gramophone.

Increasingly after 1870 the stores' work force became feminized, opening up new job opportunities for young women. Despite the low pay and long hours, they are recorded to have preferred sales work to domestic work such as sewing and housekeeping. Compared to those in domestic work, women working at department stores had marginally greater freedom along with some opportunities to interact with people of higher wealth and status. Following the World War I, the social mobility afforded by clerical work gradually decreased.

Today, major upscale Grand magasin department stores are Galeries Lafayette and Le Printemps, which both have flagship stores on Boulevard Haussmann in Paris and branches around the country. The first department store in France, Le Bon Marché in Paris, is now owned by the luxury goods conglomerate LVMH. La Samaritaine, another upscale department store also owned by LVMH, closed in 2005. Mid-range department stores chains also exist in France, such as the BHV/Marais (Bazar de l'Hotel de Ville), part of the same group as Galeries Lafayette. It's known to be the favorite department store of Parisians.

The grand Paris department stores are having difficulty surviving in the new economic world and as of 2022, just five remain; Le Bon Marché, Le BHV Marais, Galeries Lafayette, Printemps and La Samaritaine.

=== Finland ===
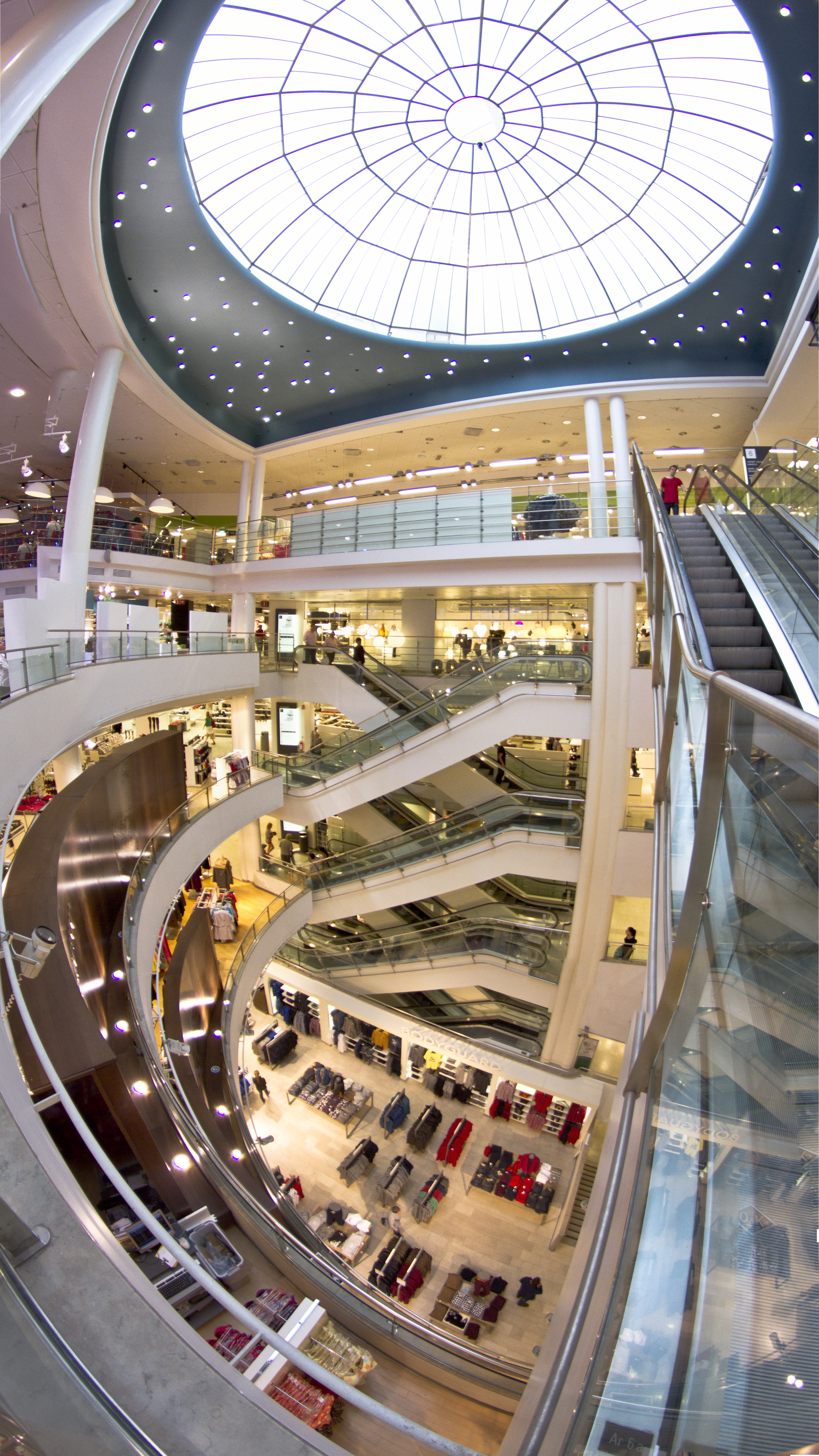
Interior of Stockmann, 2013

The most famous department store chains in Finland are Stockmann, a listed company, and Sokos, owned by a nationwide retailing cooperative. The Stockmann department store in central Helsinki is the biggest department store in the Nordic countries and a famous landmark of Helsinki.

=== Germany ===
The design and function of department stores in Germany followed the lead of London (specially Harrods), Paris (Galeries Lafayette, Printemps, Bon Marche), Chicago (Marshall Fields) and New York (Macy, Siegel, Cooper & Co). Specially important were the Wertheim and Tietz companies, both established in the 1890s. Wertheim at Berlin's Leipziger Platz, designed by Alfred Messel and opened in 1897, set a new standard. Wertheim was one of the first department store company who used signature architecture and incorporated design as part of its advertising strategies. Germany used to have a number of department store chains; now only a few of them remain. Jewish-owned department stores were confiscated from their owners during the Nazi regime. Next to some smaller, independent department stores like Breuninger in Stuttgart these are Karstadt in 2010 taken over by Nicolas Berggruen, also operating the KaDeWe and the Kaufhof at Alexanderplatz in Berlin, the Alsterhaus in Hamburg and the Oberpollinger Oberpollinger in Munich, and Galeria Kaufhof. Others like Hertie, Wertheim and Horten AG were taken over by others and either fully integrated or later closed.

Larger department stores in Germany usually contain a self-service restaurant, clothing departments, a toy department, a department for computer and electronics, a small book department (for bestsellers), a department for newspapers and magazines and a food department (like a supermarket). Sometimes these can be legends in themselves, like the carpet store in the "Wertheim" at Leipziger Platz or the gourmet food halls in the Kaufhaus des Westens (KaDeWe, German for "department store of the west")" in Berlin, which is one of the most famous department stores in Germany and one of the biggest in Europe.

In May 2020 the Karstadt Kaufhof chain announced that it would close about a third of its 170 department stores in Germany.

=== Ireland ===
Ireland developed a strong middle class, especially in the major cities, by the mid-nineteenth century. They were active patrons of department stores. Delany's New Mart was opened in 1853 in Dublin, Ireland. Unlike others, Delany's had not evolved gradually from a smaller shop on site. Thus it could claim to be the first purpose-built department store in the world. The term "department store" had not been invented at that time, so it was called the "Monster House". The store, renamed as Clerys in 1883, was completely destroyed in the 1916 Easter Rising, but reopened in 1922.

Arnotts is one of the largest stores in Ireland. However, several large retailers now own chains of department stores, such as:

- Brown Thomas
- Dunnes Stores
- Frasers
- Marks & Spencer

The most upmarket chain is undoubtedly Brown Thomas (known colloquially as BT), founded as a haberdasher's in 1849 on Dublin's Grafton Street. The company (which belongs to the same group as the UK's Selfridges or Canada's Holt Renfrew) bought its long-time competitor across the street, Switzers, from House of Fraser group in 1995. BT then moved to the larger site. It also acquired and re-branded the former Switzer stores in Cork (formerly Cash's), Limerick (formerly Todd's) and Galway (formerly Moon's).

The British department store, Debenhams, purchased the Roches Stores chain in 2006, closed two stores and rebranded the others. The opening of Dundrum Town Centre in Dublin's suburbs saw the arrival of two more British stores, House of Fraser and Harvey Nichols. The Woolworth chain store had major presence from the early twentieth century until 2020, when its stores in Ireland closed their doors for the last time.

=== Italy ===
Italy's most famous department stores are Coin, established in Mirano, Venice in 1926, and La Rinascente, founded in Milan in 1865 by Luigi and Ferdinando Bocconi.

=== Netherlands ===
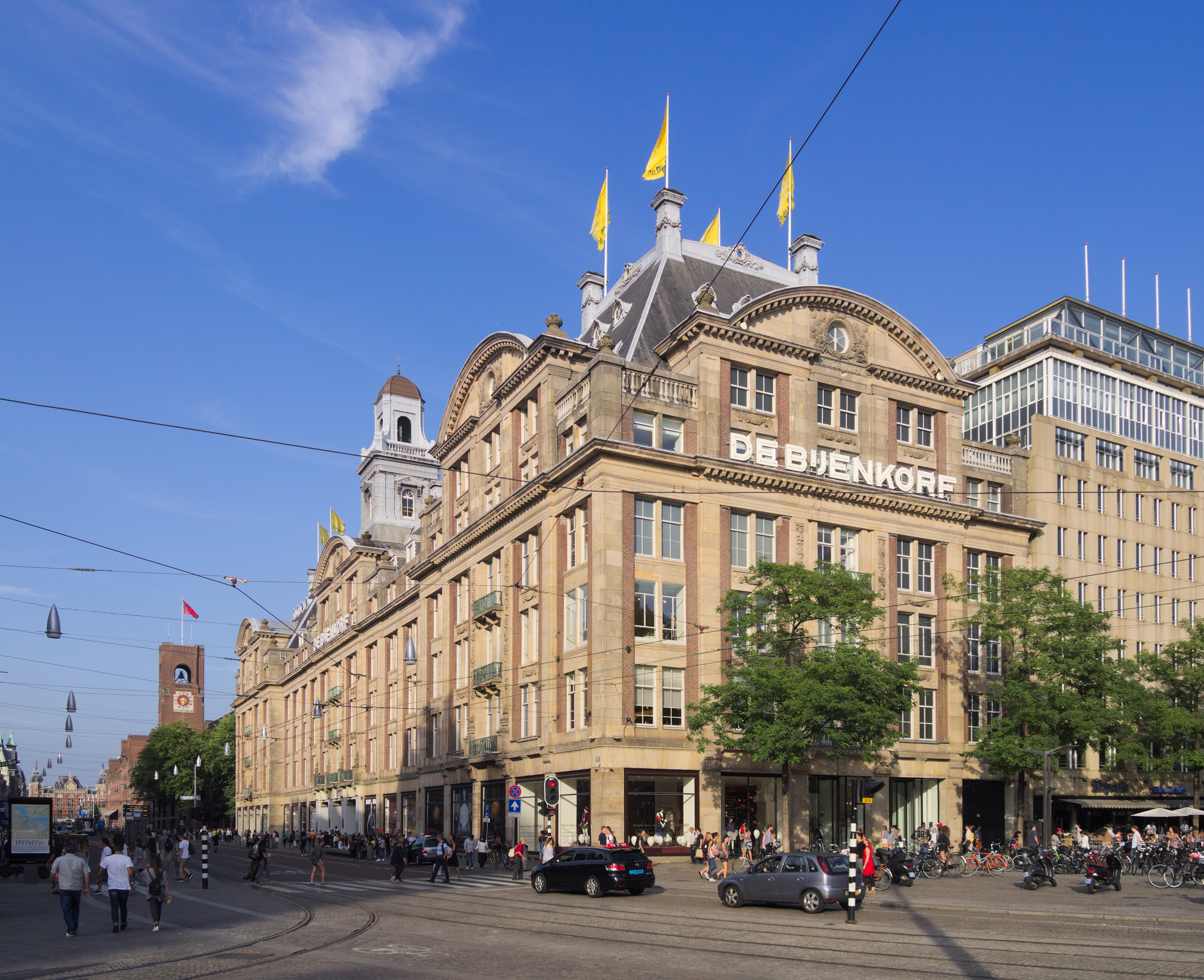
Flagship branch of Dutch department store De Bijenkorf in Amsterdam

The first department store in the Netherlands was the Winkel van Sinkel, opened in Utrecht by Anton Sinkel in 1839. It continued to exist until 1912.

The most well known in the Netherlands are the local high-end department stores De Bijenkorf and the variety stores chain HEMA. A former well-known chain in the Netherlands was V&D. At 130 years of age, it was declared bankrupt in 2016. After the bankruptcy, the Canadian Hudson's Bay Company exported its Hudson's Bay and Saks OFF 5th chains to the Netherlands and entered the market. The strongest lines in the Netherlands have always been clothing.

=== Norway ===
In Norway, most department stores are located in Oslo. There are three main department stores located all in close proximity to each other, namely Christiania Glasmagasin, Steen & Strøm and Illums.

=== Portugal ===
The traditional and century-old department stores Armazéns Grandella (established in 1891) and Grandes Armazéns do Chiado (established in 1894) closed after their main buildings were destroyed in the Chiado great fire on 25 August 1988.

Currently Portugal has only two department stores, both operated by El Corte Inglés, one in Lisbon metropolitan area, other in Porto Metropolitan Area. This small number of department stores can be explained by the widespread presence throughout the country of shopping centres and supermarket chains like Continente, owned by Sonae, Intermarché and Pingo Doce, owned by Jerónimo Martins, which are more akin to the local taste.

=== Russia ===
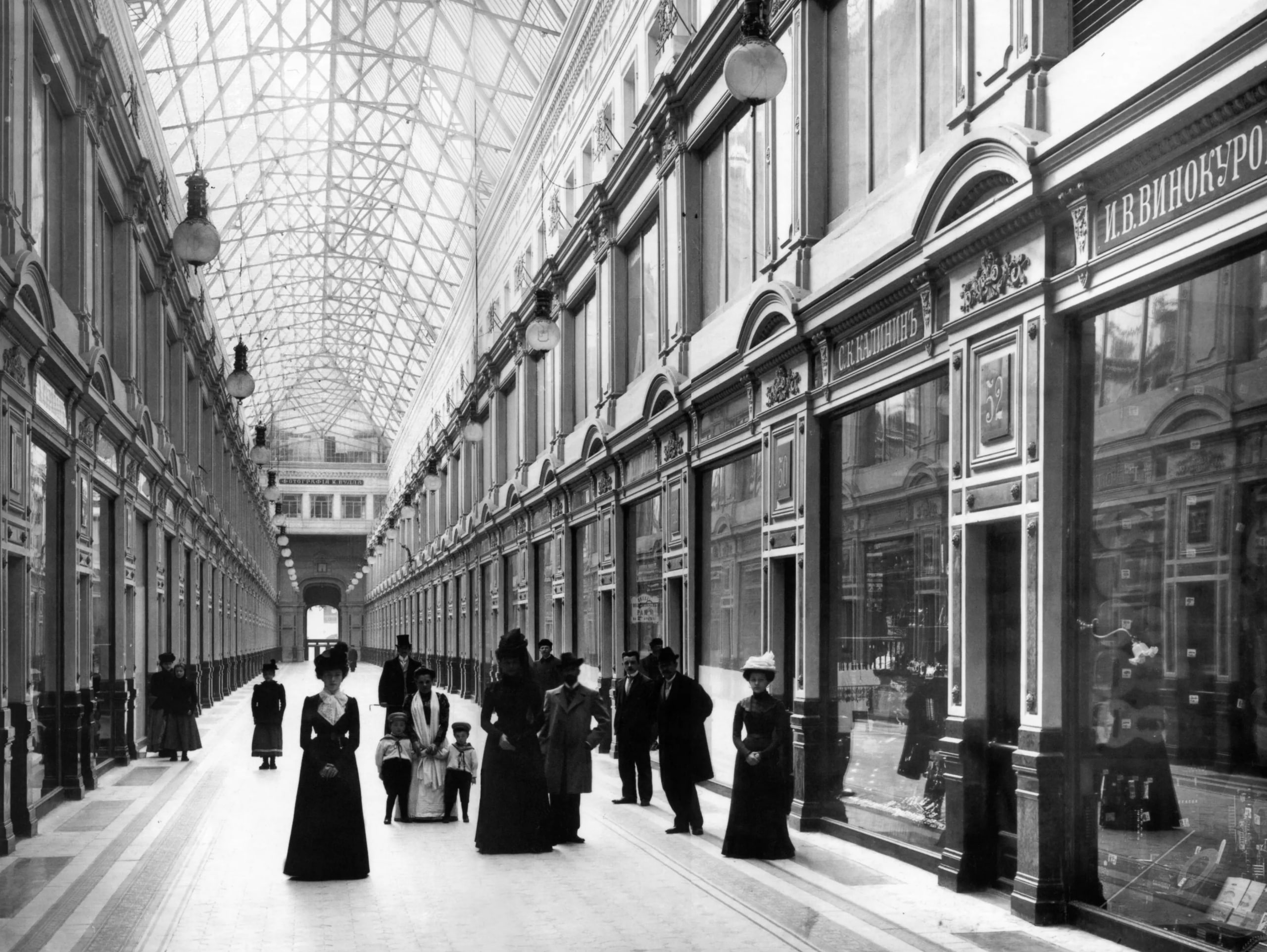
Within the renovated Passage, 1902

The site where the Saint Petersburg Passage sprawls had been devoted to trade since the city's foundation in the early 18th century. It had been occupied by various shops and warehouses (Maly Gostiny Dvor, Schukin Dvor, Apraksin Dvor) until 1846, when Count Essen-Stenbock-Fermor acquired the grounds to build an elite shopping centre for the Russian nobility and wealthy bourgeoisie. Stenbock-Fermor conceived of the Passage as more than a mere shopping centre, but also as a cultural and social centre for the people of St Petersburg. The edifice contained coffee-houses, confectioneries, panorama installations, an anatomical museum, a wax museum, and even a small zoo, described by Dostoyevsky in his extravaganza "Crocodile, or Passage through the Passage". The concert hall became renowned as a setting for literary readings attended by the likes of Dostoevsky and Turgenev. Parenthetically, the Passage premises have long been associated with the entertainment industry and still remains home to the Komissarzhevskaya Theatre.

Socialism confronted consumerism in the chain State Department Stores (GUM), set up by Lenin in 1921 as a model retail enterprise. It operated stores throughout Russia and targeted consumers across class, gender, and ethnic lines. GUM was designed to advance the Bolsheviks' goals of eliminating private enterprise and rebuilding consumerism along socialist lines, as well as democratizing consumption for workers and peasants nationwide. GUM became a major propaganda purveyor, with advertising and promotional campaigns that taught Russians the goals of the regime and attempted to inculcate new attitudes and behavior. In trying to create a socialist consumer culture from scratch, GUM recast the functions and meanings of buying and selling, turning them into politically charged acts that could either contribute to or delay the march toward utopian communism. By the late 1920s, however, GUM's grandiose goals had proven unrealistic and largely alienated consumers, who instead learned a culture of complaint and entitlement. GUM's main function became one of distributing whatever the factories sent them, regardless of consumer demand or quality.

In the 21st century the most famous department store in Russia is GUM in Moscow, followed by TsUM and the Petrovsky Passage. Other popular stores are Mega (shopping centres), Stockmann, and Marks & Spencer. Media Markt, M-video, Technosila, and White Wind (Beliy Veter) sell a large number of electronic devices. In St. Petersburg, the Passage has been popular since the 1840s. The 1956 Soviet film Behind Store Window depicts the operation of a Moscow department store in the 1950s.

=== Spain ===
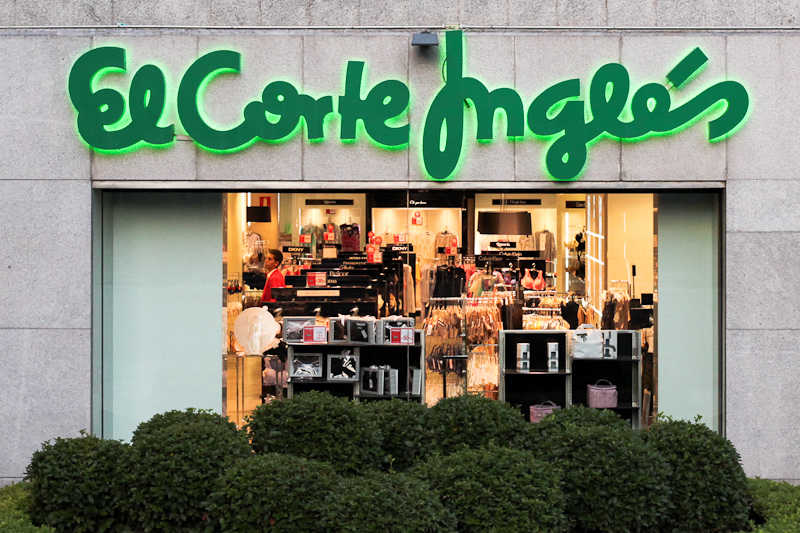
Spanish company El Corte Inglés is Europe's biggest department store group and the third-largest worldwide.

The first department store in Spain was Almacenes el Siglo, opened in October 1881 in Barcelona. Following the 2002 closure by the Australian group Partridges of their SEPU (Sociedad Española de Precios Unicos) department store chain, which was one of Spain's oldest, the market is now dominated by El Corte Inglés, founded in 1934 as a drapery store. El Corte Inglés stores tend to be vast buildings, selling a very broad range of product. The group also controls a number of other retail formats, including the supermarket chain Supercor and hypermarket chain Hipercor. It currently employs 91,000 people and is the largest department store in Europe, with department stores all over mainland Spain, the Balearic Islands, the Canary Islands and Portugal. Its first store opened in Madrid, where it currently has its headquarters. As of 2016, there were 95 El Corte Inglés department stores.

Other competitors such as Simago and Galerías Preciados closed in the 1990s. El Corte Inglés also faces competition from French discount operators such as Carrefour and Auchan.

=== Sweden ===
The largest department store chain in Sweden is Åhléns, which operates stores throughout the country. Its flagship Stockholm store, Åhléns City, is the largest department store in Sweden. Other large stores are Nordiska Kompaniet in Stockholm and Gothenburg, and PUB in Stockholm (closed in 2015).

=== Switzerland ===
The Swiss retail market is dominated by two consumers' cooperatives, Migros and Coop, which also run department stores. Migros operates 12 upscale Globus department stores and 34 mid-range Migros MMM centers across the country. Since the acquisition of EPA in 2002, Coop operates its mid-range department stores under the brand Coop City. Manor operates department stores throughout the country. Jelmoli and Loeb operate upscale department stores in Zürich and Bern respectively.

=== United Kingdom ===
The origins of the departmental store lay in the growth of the conspicuous consumer society at the turn of the 19th century. As the Industrial Revolution accelerated economic expansion, the affluent middle-class grew in size and wealth. Urbanized social groups, sharing a culture of consumerism and changing fashions, were the catalyst for the retail revolution. As rising prosperity and social mobility increased the number of people, especially women (who found they could shop unaccompanied at department stores without damaging their reputation), with disposable income in the late Georgian period, window shopping was transformed into a leisure activity and entrepreneurs, like the potter Josiah Wedgwood, pioneered the use of marketing techniques to influence the prevailing tastes and preferences of society. Department stores also often featured post services, childcare services, restaurants and other services that appealed to female shoppers.

Bennett's in Derby, first established as an ironmonger (hardware shop) in 1734, lays claim to being Britain's oldest department store, with the business still trading from the same building.

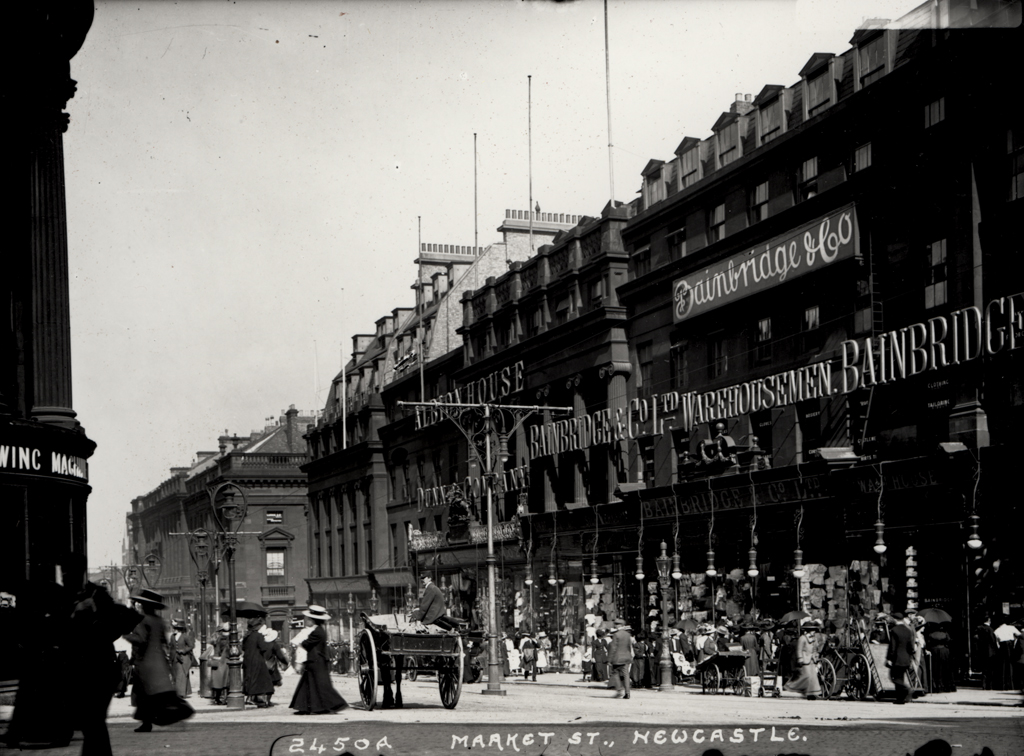
Bainbridge's Market Street frontage c.1912.

Bainbridge & Co (now owned by John Lewis) also lays claim to being Britain's oldest proper department store. The business dates back to 1838, when Emerson Muschamp Bainbridge went into partnership with William Alder Dunn and opened a drapers and fashion shop in Newcastle's Market Street. In 1849 there were 23 separate departments, with weekly takings recorded by department. The original ledger survives and is now kept in the archives of the John Lewis Partnership.

Kendals (formerly Kendal Milne & Faulkner) in Manchester lays claim to being one of the first department stores and is still known to many of its customers as Kendal's, despite its 2005 name change to House of Fraser. The Manchester institution dates back to 1836 but had been trading as Watts Bazaar since 1796.

However, the first reliably dated department store to be established, was Harding, Howell & Co., which opened in 1796 on Pall Mall, London. An observer writing in Ackermann's Repository, a British periodical on contemporary taste and fashion, described the enterprise in 1809 as follows:

The house is one hundred and fifty feet in length from front to back, and of proportionate width. It is fitted up with great taste, and is divided by glazed partitions into four departments, for the various branches of the extensive business, which is there carried on. Immediately at the entrance is the first department, which is exclusively appropriated to the sale of furs and fans. The second contains articles of haberdashery of every description, silks, muslins, lace, gloves, &etc. In the third shop, on the right, you meet with a rich assortment of jewelry, ornamental articles in ormolu, French clocks, &etc.; and on the left, with all the different kinds of perfumery necessary for the toilette. The fourth is set apart for millinery and dresses; so that there is no article of female attire or decoration, but what may be here procured in the first style of elegance and fashion. This concern has been conducted for the last twelve years by the present proprietors who have spared neither trouble nor expense to ensure the establishment of a superiority over every other in Europe, and to render it perfectly unique in its kind.

In Scotland, Jenners was founded by Charles Jenner and Charles Kennington and has maintained its position on Edinburgh's Princes Street from 1838 until 2021. It laid claim to being the oldest independent department store in Scotland.

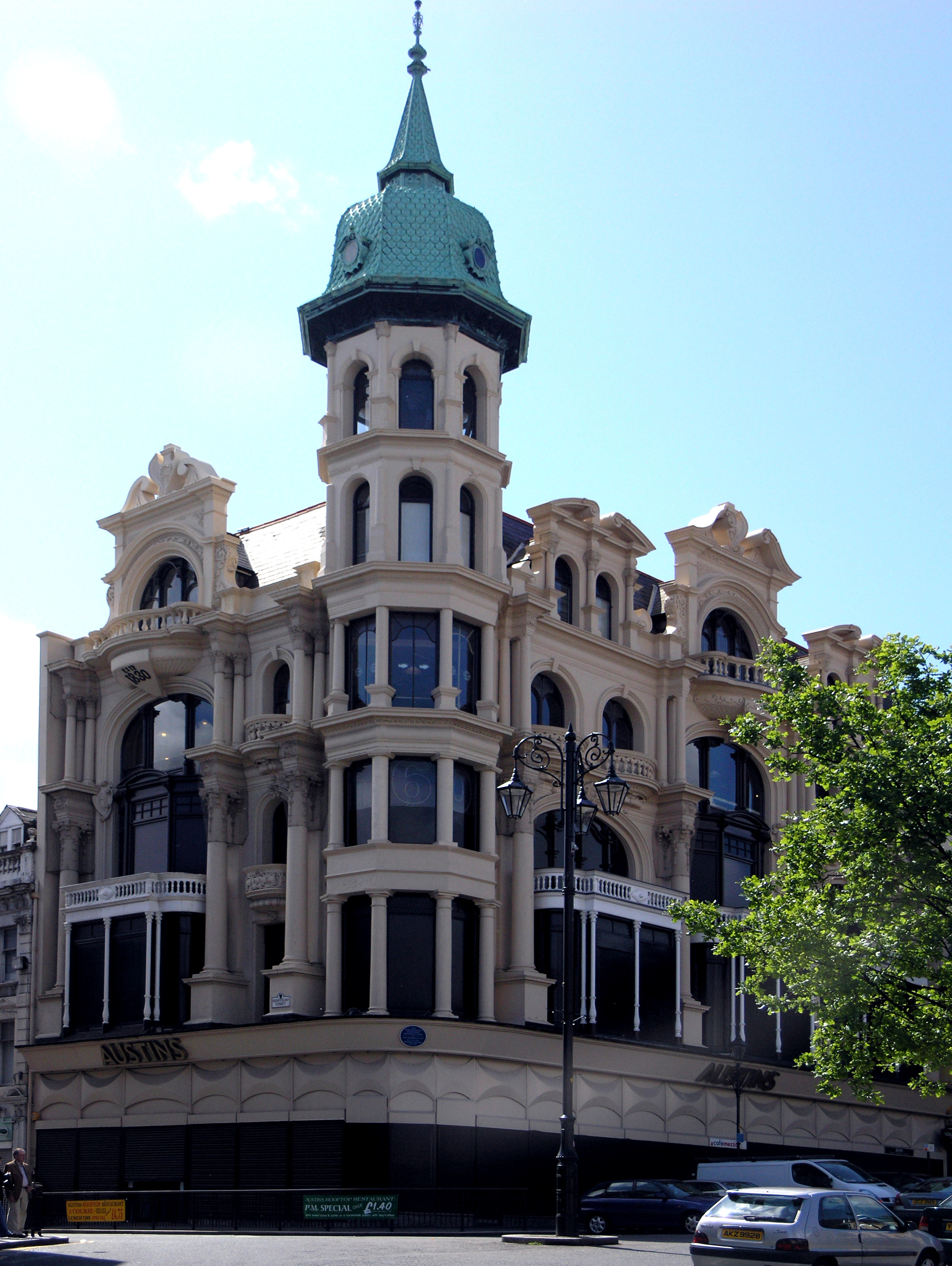
Austins department store, 2007

In Northern Ireland, Austins in Derry, was established as a department store in 1830, and according to some claims was the world's first department store. The domineering building measured 25,000 square feet (2,300 m^{2}) and was five stories high with an Edwardian-style exterior.

By the mid nineteenth century, many British cities had flourishing department stores, with pioneers in London including James Shoolbred (est.1820), George Hitchcock Williams & Co (est.1841), Swan & Edgar (est.1812), Dickins & Jones (est.1790), Marshall & Snelgrove (est.1837) and Harrods (est.1834), while in Scotland, there was the firms of J. & W. Campbell & Co (est.1817) and Andersons Royal Polytechnic (est.1837) in Glasgow, and Duncan McLaren in Edinburgh (est.1824).

The UK's first purpose-built department store building was Compton House in Liverpool, completed in 1867 for the retailer J.R. Jeffrey, to replace a previous building which had burned down in 1865. It was probably the largest in the world at the time. It is occupied today by Marks & Spencer.

Increasingly, women became the main customers. In London, department stores were established in Oxford Street, Regent Street and Knightsbridge in the mid-19th century. These were distinctly modern stores with lavish displays of imported goods, especially Oriental shawls, embroidery and furniture and served a wealthy clientele.

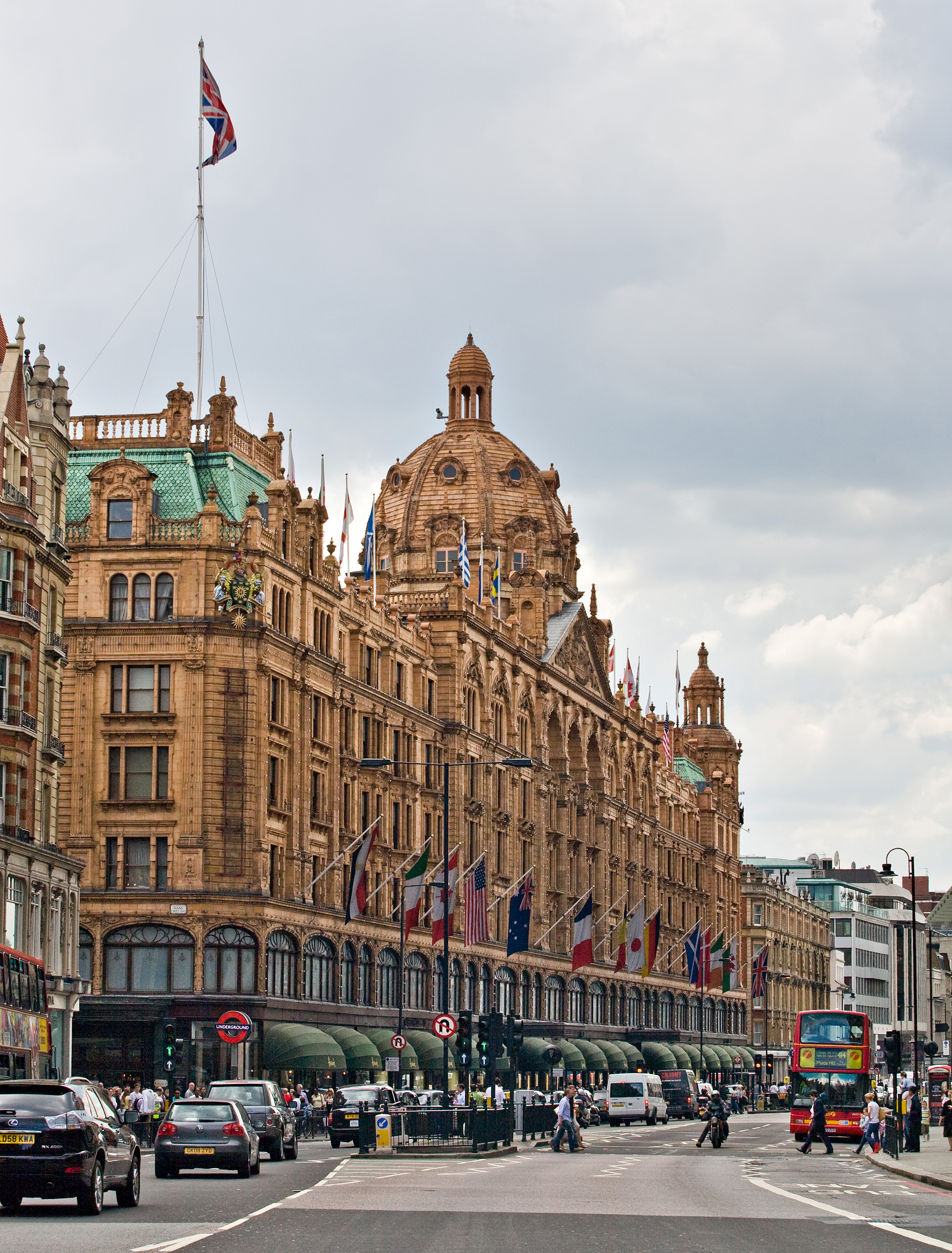
Harrods in London

The grandest of the stores, Harrods of London can be traced back to 1834, while the current store on Brompton Road on a site they acquired in 1849, was constructed between 1894 and 1905. The influential Liberty & Co. gained popularity in the 1870s for selling Oriental goods. During the 1890s, Liberty built strong relationships with many English designers. Many of these designers, including Archibald Knox, practised the artistic styles known as Arts and Crafts and Art Nouveau, and Liberty helped develop Art Nouveau through his encouragement of such designers. The company became associated with this new style, to the extent that in Italy, Art Nouveau became known as the Stile Liberty, after the London shop.

By the 1870s and 80s, many more department stores had arrived, with Gamages in London's High Holborn, William Whiteley in Bayswater, John Barker in Kensington, Allders in Croydon, Bentalls in Kingston upon Thames, H. Binns, Son & Co in Sunderland, Debenhams in London, John Lewis in London, Browns of Chester, Walter Wilson & Co. and Wylie & Lochhead of Glasgow and Jenners of Edinburgh.

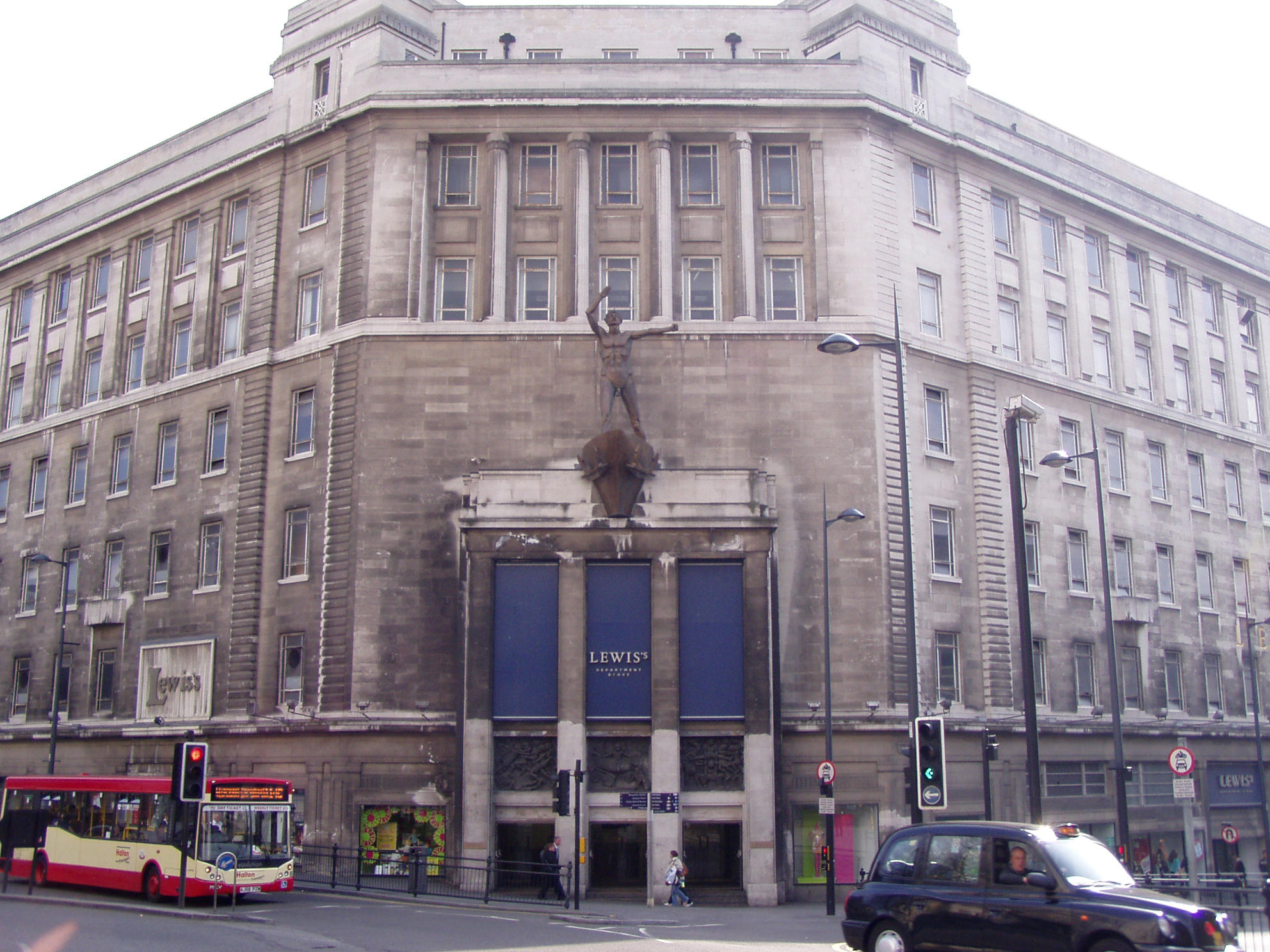
Lewis's Department Store, Liverpool

By 1900, London, Glasgow and Liverpool were the three largest shopping centres in the country. The company Lewis's started in Liverpool in 1856 and experimented with new ways of advertising (such as flooding the basement of the Manchester store to create a mini Venice.) Lewis's built up the largest chain of stores in the country, opening branches in Manchester (1877), Birmingham, Glasgow, Leeds, Hanley, London, Blackpool, Bristol and Leicester.

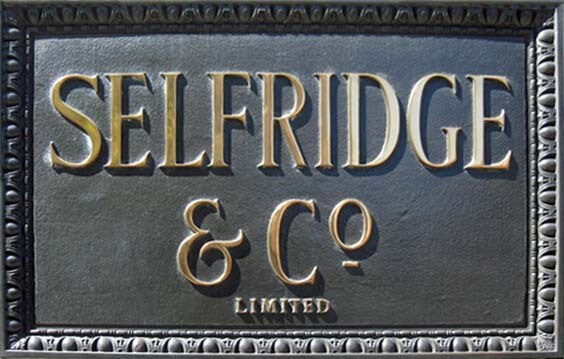
Selfridges nameboard

Selfridges was established in 1909 by American-born Harry Gordon Selfridge on Oxford Street. The company's innovative marketing promoted the radical notion of shopping for pleasure rather than necessity and its techniques were adopted by modern department stores the world over. The store was extensively promoted through paid advertising. The shop floors were structured so that goods could be made more accessible to customers. There were elegant restaurants with modest prices, a library, reading and writing rooms, special reception rooms for French, German, American and "Colonial" customers, a First Aid Room, and a Silence Room, with soft lights, deep chairs, and double-glazing, all intended to keep customers in the store as long as possible. Staff members were taught to be on hand to assist customers, but not too aggressively, and to sell the merchandise. Selfridge attracted shoppers with educational and scientific exhibits; in 1909, Louis Blériot's monoplane was exhibited at Selfridges (Blériot was the first to fly over the English Channel), and the first public demonstration of television by John Logie Baird took place in the department store in 1925.

During the mid-1920s, several new investment groups were created and started buying up regional drapers and department stores. Clarence Hatry had created the Drapery Trust in 1925, while Charterhouse Bank's company, Charterhouse Investments Trust under Sir Arthur Wheeler, 1st Baronet had created United Drapery Stores in 1927, and Selfridge Provincial Stores was created by James White and Gordon Selfridge in 1926. Debenhams, who by 1919 controlled Marshall & Snelgrove and Harvey Nichols, felt threatened as they would lose the sales to these new combined groups from its extensive wholesale business, and in 1927 agreed a deal to purchase the Drapery Trust from Hatry. However, Hatry's fraudulent dealings nearly brought Debenhams down, along with the collapse of the world economy, and the company had to write down its capital value from £15,100,000 to £6,000,000. The other combined groups also struggled, with United Drapery Stores being saved by Eagle Star Insurance Company, while Selfridge Provincial Stores was eventually sold to John Lewis Partnership

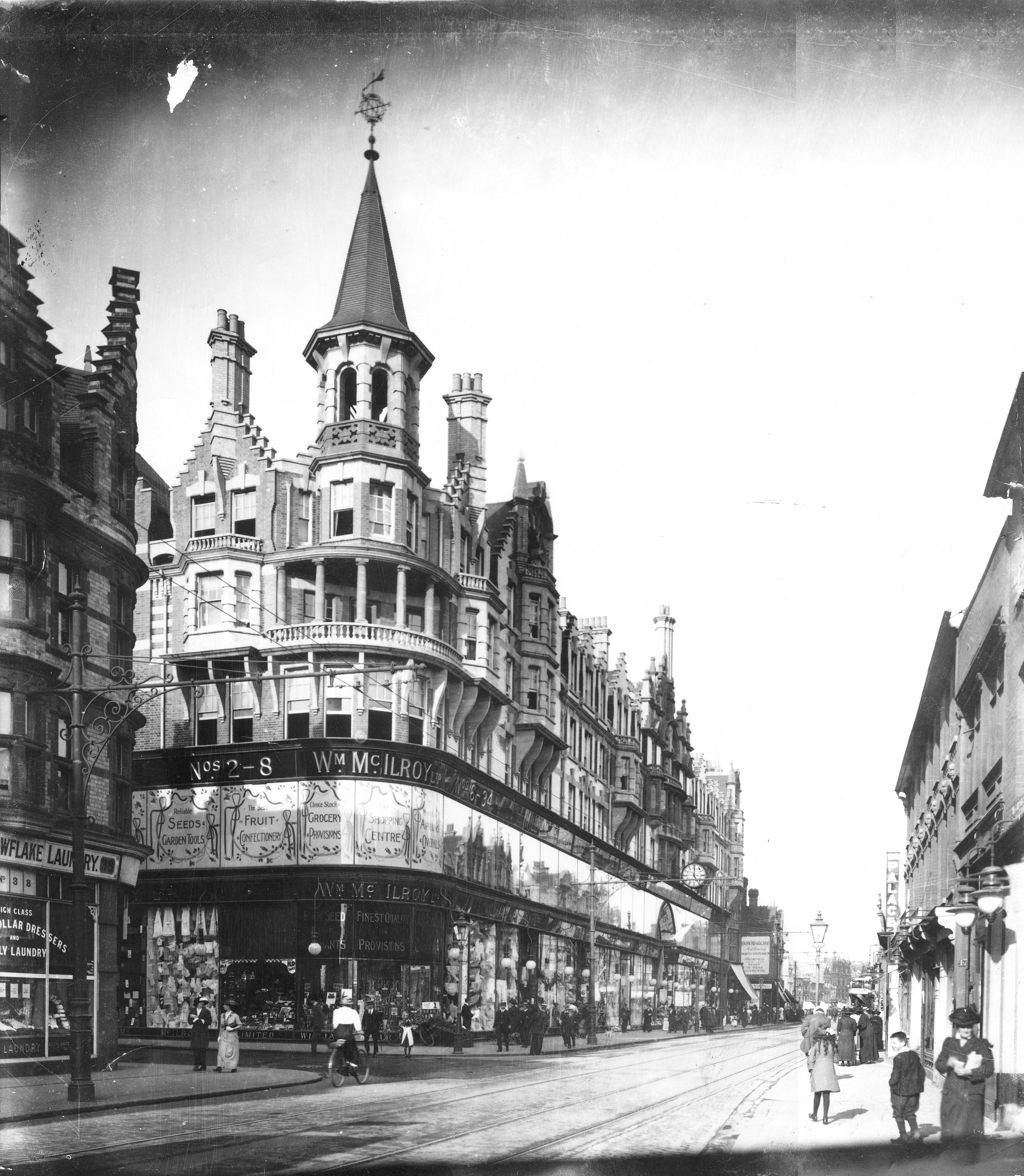
The William McIlroy department store on Oxford Road in Reading c. 1920

After the war, more consolidation was seen with groups like Great Universal Stores, House of Fraser, Debenhams, Owen Owen, United Drapery Stores, Macowards, Hide & Co, William McIlroy and London Co-operative Society expanding by buying up smaller independent rivals.

During the 1970s, Debenhams rebranded their original named stores, like Bobby & Co. and Griffin & Spalding to Debenhams, while United Drapery Stores moved the likes of John Farnon (Newcastle) and Mackross (Cardiff) to become Allders. Many smaller chains, like Army & Navy Stores, E Dingle & Co, and Chiesmans were swallowed up by House of Fraser.

The market shrunk further with chains Owen Owen and Lewis's closing, and The Co-operative Group pulling out of the department store trade. Both House of Fraser and John Lewis began a period of rationalisation during the 2000s, bringing all the stores under their own name.

Most department stores struggled to adapt to new shopping habits. In 2005, Allders as a group collapsed, with only the original Croydon store being saved. House of Fraser was saved from administration on the 10 August 2018 by Sports Direct, when they agreed to buy the assets of the business, the stores, brand and the stock, for £90 million in cash on a pre-packaged insolvency basis. The biggest collapse was Debenhams in 2021, which closed after 243 years of business.

The existing major brands are:

- Harrods was rebuilt as a in 1889, after a devastating fire in 1883.
- John Lewis was opened in 1864, and it currently operates 51 stores across the UK.
- Selfridges was opened in 1909 by the American entrepreneur Harry Gordon Selfridge.
- House of Fraser owns and operates several department stores across the UK.
- Harvey Nichols of Sloane Street, Knightsbridge is Harrods' closest competitor.
- Fenwick was founded in 1882 in Newcastle upon Tyne. Its flagship Newcastle store is one of the largest department stores in the country. The company is still family owned and is one of the largest independent department store chains in the country.

== Oceania ==
=== Australia ===
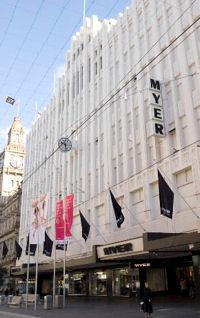
Myer's flagship store in Melbourne's Bourke Street Mall in Melbourne

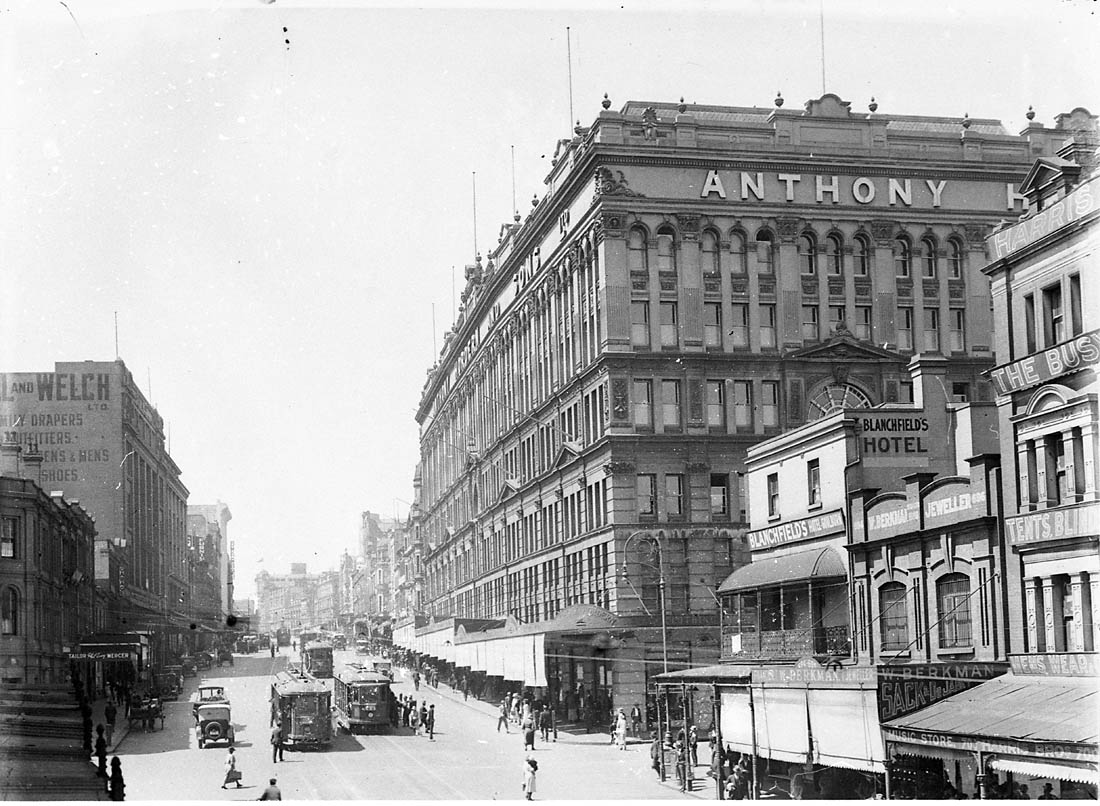
Anthony Hordern & Sons in Sydney. The building was demolished in the 1980s.

David Jones was started by David Jones, a Welsh merchant who met Hobart businessman Charles Appleton in London. Appleton established a store in Sydney in 1825 and Jones subsequently established a partnership with Appleton, moved to Australia in 1835, and the Sydney store became known as Appleton & Jones. When the partnership was dissolved in 1838, Jones moved his business to premises on the corner of George and Barrack streets. David Jones claims to be the oldest department store in the world still trading under its original name.

In Melbourne, the earliest large department store was Coles Book Arcade (1873–1929). Edward Cole's vast premises extended south from Bourke Street Mall for two city blocks and included departments for books, a glass and china department, a photographic studio, tea rooms, toy department, stationery department, confectionery department, as well as a permanent musical band for entertaining customers, a cage of monkeys, circulating library and other entertainments. The store is remembered largely through the now out-of-print Coles Funny Picture Books for children. Buckley & Nunn was a smaller store directly opposite the arcade, later taken over and expanded by David Jones, that still exists to this day. In the same precinct is the flagship Myer Melbourne store. Other defunct department stores of Melbourne include Ball & Welch, Foy & Gibson, Georges and Manton's.

Department stores tend to target different socio-economic and geographic segments:

- Upscale/Luxury: David Jones, Harrolds, Peter's of Kensington
- Middle market/Upscale: Myer, Harvey Norman
- Middle market/Downscale: Harris Scarfe
- Fast-fashion: H&M, Zara, Uniqlo
- Discount stores: Kmart, Target, Big W, The Reject Shop/Dollarama. Dimmeys, Best & Less
- Off-price retailers: TK Maxx

Although there were a number of department stores in Australia for much of the 20th century, including chains such as Grace Bros and Waltons, many disappeared during the 1980s and 1990s. Today Myer, David Jones and Harris Scarfe, located nationally, are practically the national department stores oligopoly in Australia. When Russian-born migrant, Sidney Myer, came to Australia in 1899 he formed the Myer retail group with his brother, Elcon Myer. In 1900, they opened the first Myer department store, in Bendigo. Since then, the Myer retail group has grown to be Australia's largest retailer. Both Myer and David Jones are up-market chains, offering a wide variety of products from mid-range names to luxury brands while the Adelaide based Harris Scarfe is pitched towards brand led value, with hi-lo pricing. Other retail chain stores led by Kmart but also dominated by Target (unrelated to the American chain of the same name), Venture (now defunct), and Big W, also located nationally, are considered to be Australia's discount department stores. Most department stores in Australia have their own credit card companies, each having their own benefits while the discount department stores do not have their own credit card rights.

=== New Zealand ===
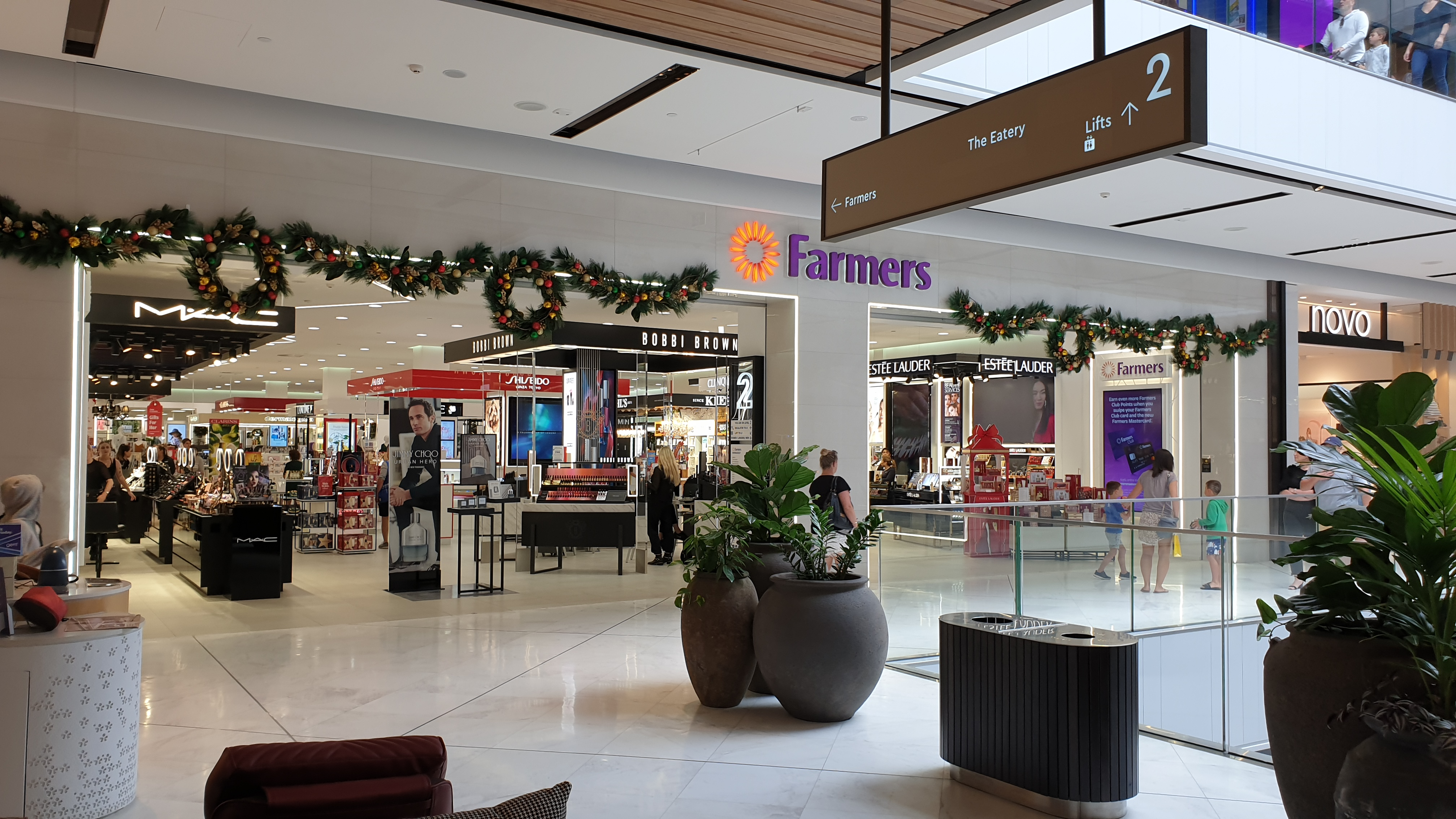
Farmers department store in Auckland's Westfield Newmarket in 2019

New Zealand has one major national traditional department store chain, the mid-range Farmers chain, which has been around since 1909.

The three major cities in New Zealand historically had a main high-end department store in the downtown district, Smith & Caughey's in Auckland, Ballantynes in Christchurch, and Kirkcaldie & Stains in Wellington (later David Jones from 2016). However, only Ballantynes remains with David Jones closing its Wellington store in 2022 and Smith and Caughey's closing all branches in 2025.

As of 2025 Ballantynes is the only high-end department store chain in New Zealand following the closure of DFS (a singular David Jones store remains in operation at Westfield Newmarket). It was announced in November 2025, that luxury boutique department store Faradays would expand and open a three floor flagship on Auckland's Queen Street in 2026.

David Jones entered New Zealand in 2016 opening a store in Wellington after purchasing Kirkcaldie & Stains. A second store was opened in 2019 in Auckland however the Wellington store shuttered in 2022 and currently Farmers is the only department store in Wellington CBD. Discount chains include The Warehouse, Kmart and now-defunct DEKA. Former department store chains include Arthur Barnett, DIC, Haywrights, H & J Smith and Milne & Choyce.

== See also ==
- List of department stores by country
