= Bílá labuť =

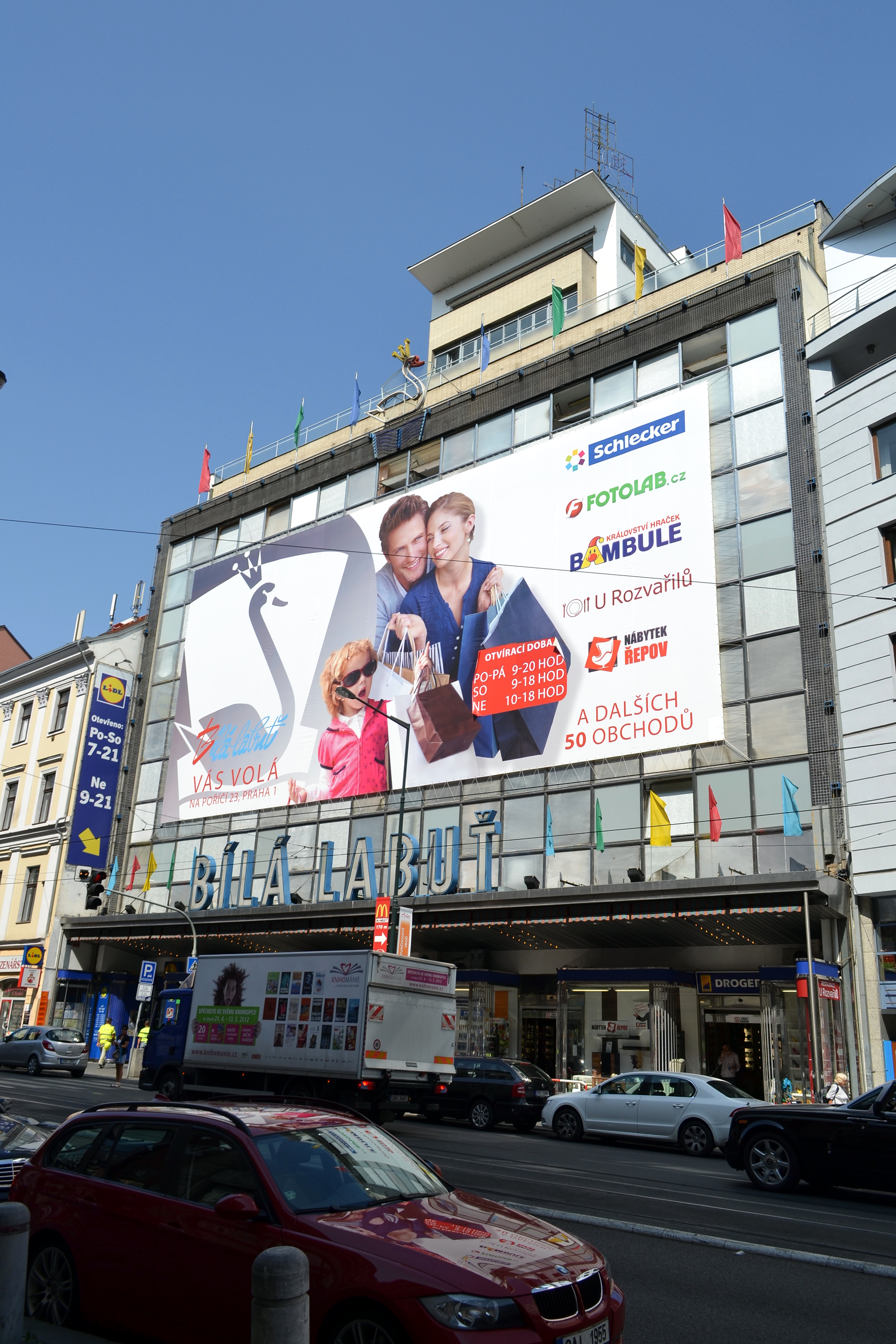
- Location: Prague, Czech Republic
- Coordinates: 50°05′25″N 14°26′02″E
- Address: Na Poříčí Street
- Opened: March 1939
- Website: www.bilalabut.cz

Bílá labuť (in English 'White Swan') is a department store on Na Poříčí Street in central Prague, Czech Republic. It is considered to be one of the finest examples of interwar avant-garde architecture. It is recognised by the Prague Municipality as an architecturally valuable building and is protected as a cultural real estate monument. At the time it was opened in 1939, it was the biggest and most modern department store in Central and Eastern Europe. It is currently undergoing extensive renovation.

== History ==
The Bílá labuť Department Store building is located on Na Poříčí Street, one of the busiest streets in the New Town area of Prague 1. The building stands on the former site of the "U Podušků" inn and brewery. Over time, these buildings became known as the White Swan Inn due to the Swan Statute on their facade.

In the 1930s the buildings were purchased by Jaroslav Brouk of Brouk a Babka. The old buildings were demolished and replaced by a functionalist department store which opened in 1939.

The new building bore the Bílá labuť name and was designed by renowned architects Josef Kittrich and Josef Hrubý. The department store has a total area of about 72,000 m³ spread over 11 floors, including 6 retail floors. It is recognized as one of Prague's most architecturally important buildings and a celebrated example of the "International Style" of functionalism. At the time of its opening, it was the largest and most modern commercial building in Central and Eastern Europe and remains well known throughout the Czech Republic as a retail icon.

Interesting features of the building included modern interior design, the first escalator in Prague, and a glass facade measuring 33 x 18 meters, consisting of 180 sheets of non-transparent, silver-gray glass with thermal- and noise-insulating properties. At the time, it was the largest glass-covered space in central Europe. There is also an eight-meter revolving neon swan on the roof – the oldest neon sign in Prague.

The building was opened on 19 March 1939 against the tragic background of the Nazi occupation of the Czech Republic, which had occurred four days previously, and the store has been continuously operating since then.

== Today ==
In November 2017, a renovation that fully respects the original, historically protected, construction began. This includes a complete restoration of the glass facade, which had deteriorated significantly over the years.

The store remains a key retail destination in Prague, with high footfall and demographics in the surrounding area. Tenants include Lidl, Kika, and a large number of other medium to smaller retail spaces.
