= Harrolds =

Australian department store

- Founded: 1985
- Founder: John, Mary, and Theo Poulakis
- Headquarters: Sydney, Australia
- Website: harroldsau.com

Harrolds is an Australian mens department store founded in 1985 by John, Mary, and Theo Poulakis.

In 2024 the family-run chain entered administration and closed its three stores in Melbourne, Sydney and on the Gold Coast. Harrolds was revived in 2025 by two former employees and now operates one store in Sydney.

== History ==
Harrolds was founded in 1985 by John, Mary, and Theo Poulakis, as a mens department store. The first store was located on Collins Street, Melbourne. Harrolds opened a womenswear store at Westfield Sydney in 2015.

In October 2024, the company entered administration with creditors owed $16.3 million with all three stores closed.

Harrolds was revived in 2025 by former employees Arasch Enayat and Gino Pagano. The Sydney store reopened in July 2025, the Melbourne and Gold Coast stores will not reopen. The store now only focuses on menswear. The Poulakis family is no longer involved in the company.
