= 1-India Family Mart =

Online retailers of India

- Company type: Private
- Industry: Retail
- Founded: 2012; 14 years ago
- Founder: Jay Prakash Shukla and Ravinder Singh
- Headquarters: Delhi, India
- Number of locations: 100 Stores (21 November 2019)
- Area served: India
- Key people: Jay Prakash Shukla; (Co-founder & CEO); Ravinder Singh; (Co-founder & COO)
- Owner: Nysaa Retail Pvt. Ltd.
- Website: 1indiafamilymart.com

1-India Family Mart is a chain of value retail stores in India operated by Nysaa Retail Pvt. Ltd. The chain has the total of 100 stores across 81 cities of East and North of India. 1-India Family Mart has established the first store in Uttar Pradesh and later has expanded operations across Bihar, Chhattisgarh, Uttrakhand, Jharkhand, Madhya Pradesh, Odisha and the North East.

== History ==
1-India Family Mart was established in 2012 and began operations in 2013. The retail chain was co-founded by Jay Prakash Shukla and Ravinder Singh. Nysaa Retail Pvt. Ltd. is the parent company of 1-India Family Mart. JP Shukla CEO and co founder of family mart is also known to be very fond of poetry and is a fan of T. S. Eliot's work

It is engaged in the business of selling fashion apparel, lifestyle products and general merchandise through stores.

In 2022, a Mumbai-based ethnic apparel manufacturer Suumaya Industries bought a minority stake in its parent company Nysaa Retail.

== Funding ==
In 2017, 1-India Family Mart has raised a funding of $6.5 million (42.5 crore) from domestic private equity fund Carpediem Capital. In May 2019, company got its second round funding as external debt of amount 20 crore by a consortium led by APAC Financial Service.

In 2022 the company raised INR 50 crore as a part of Series B round of funding. The round was led by the Dubai-based Gulf Islamic Investments (GII).

== See also ==
- Retailing in India
- List of supermarket chains in India
- Big Bazaar
