= List of department stores by country =

This is a list of department stores. In the case of department store groups the location of the flagship store is given. This list does not include large specialist stores, which sometimes resemble department stores.

Note: "trading" is British English for "in operation".

== Africa ==
=== Botswana ===
Currently trading:

- Woolworths (Nationwide, since 1987)

Defunct:

- Stuttafords – operating till 2017

=== Egypt ===
==== Currently trading ====
- Marks & Spencer (Nationwide, since 2010)
- Omar Effendi (Nationwide, since 1856)

Defunct:

- Adès
- Benzion
- Chemla
- Cicurel
- Debenhams
- Salon Vert
- Sednaoui

=== Eswatini ===
- Edgars (Manzini and Mbabane)
- Woolworths (Nationwide)

=== Ghana ===
Defunct:

- Edgars
- Woolworths – operating from 2002 to 2019

=== Kenya ===
- Woolworths

Defunct:

- Whiteaway Laidlaw

=== Lesotho ===
- Edgars
- Woolworths

=== Madagascar ===
- Printemps

=== Morocco ===
Currently trading:

- Marks & Spencer

Defunct:

- Galeries Lafayette – operating from the 1920s to 1970s and 2011 to 2016

=== Mozambique ===
- Woolworths

=== Namibia ===
- Edgars
- Woolworths
- Stuttafords

=== Nigeria ===
- Woolworths – operating from 2011 to 2013

=== South Africa ===
Currently trading:

- Edgars
- Woolworths

Defunct:

- Garlicks
- Stuttafords

=== Tanzania ===
- Woolworths

=== Uganda ===
- Woolworths

=== Zambia ===
- Woolworths

==== Defunct ====
- Edgars

=== Zimbabwe ===
- Edgars

== North America and Central America ==
=== Canada ===
Currently operating department stores:

- Les Ailes de la Mode (Montreal, operating from 1994 to 2017 and since 2026)
- Holt Renfrew (Nationwide, since 1837)
- Simons (Nationwide, since 1840)

Currently operating discount department stores:

- Canadian Tire (Nationwide, since 1922)
- Designer Depot (Nationwide, since 2004)
- Fields (Nationwide, since 1950)
- Giant Tiger (Nationwide, since 1961)
- Hart (Nationwide, since 1960)
- Marshalls (Nationwide, since 2011)
- Walmart Canada (Nationwide, since 1994)
- Winners (Nationwide, since 1982)
- Zellers (Edmonton, Toronto, and Windsor, operating from 1928 to 1930, from 1931 to 2020, from 2021 to 2025, and since 2025)

Defunct:

- Adilman's Department Store – Saskatoon, SK (1921–1974)
- Army & Navy Stores
- Ayre and Sons – Newfoundland-based department store chain; once operated as many as 80 stores coast-to-coast (1859–1991)
- Biway – discount store based in Ontario, defunct in 2001
- The Bon Marché – independent discount variety store in St. John's, Newfoundland 1919–1971
- Bowring Brothers – St. John's, NL, department store, also national home decor store chain 1811–2019
- Bretton's – high-end department store, 1985–1996
- Caban – Club Monaco's Home Store, 2000–2006
- Caplan's – Ottawa, Ontario department store; founded in 1897, closed in 1984
- Consumers Distributing – Canadian catalogue discount retailer (formerly Consumers Distributing Ltd., 1957 to 1996)
- Dupuis Frères – Montreal department store, founded by Nazaire Dupuis (1870), closed 1978
- Eaton's – founded in 1869, went bankrupt in 1999; acquired by Sears Canada; defunct in 2002; as with the closure of Woodward's a decade earlier (see below), the vacancies left by Eaton's stores sparked a number of major shopping mall renovations and reconfigurations across the country
- Freimans – longtime Ottawa retailer, acquired by the Bay in 1972
- Goudies – Kitchener, Ontario (1918–1988)
- Home Outfitters – home goods store, subsidiary of Hudsons Bay Company, 1999–2019
- Hudson's Bay – department store owned by Hudson's Bay Company (HBC). Formerly called The Bay, 1881—2025
- Horizon – discount department store operated by Eaton's, 1967–1978
- Kmart Canada – discount department store, usually in the suburbs, created by S.S. Kresge sold Canadian stores to Hudson's Bay Company in 1997; many of these stores closed outright; the few that remained were converted to HBC's Zellers banner
- Laliberté – Quebec City department store, founded in 1867, closed 2020
- Larocque's Department Store 1923–1971 Ottawa, Ontario; constructed in 1923 to cater to the Francophone community of Lowertown; William Noffke made additions to the space in 1930; Management and ownership taken over by Joe Vineberg 1931 with relatives Harry and Sol Goodman of New Glasgow, Nova Scotia. Closed circa 1970–1971; now the Mercury Court Building, housing offices of Barry Padolsky Associates Inc. and shops. Barry Padolsky Associates Inc. renovated and expanded the space from 1989 to 1993. Features include a Mercury weathervane by the American sculptor W. H. Mullen, which was rescued from the Sun Life Building, demolished in 1949. The building was included amongst other architecturally interesting and historically significant buildings in Doors Open Ottawa, 2012.
- Goodman Department Store- New Glasgow-Antigonish-Truro in Nova Scotia-Ottawa-Montreal. Established in 1904 by Harry Goodman, his brother Sol Goodman and the Vineburg Family under the name Vineburg Goodman & Co. Goodman's was northern Nova Scotia's first and largest department store with 34 departments. The Ottawa store operated under the name of Larocque noted above. Goodman Co. closed in Antigonish, New Glasgow and Truro in 1984–1985. The stores were redeveloped shopping centres in Antigonish by developer Brian MacLeod and in New Glasgow the largest store by Brian MacLeod, and lawyers Richard Goodman Q.C. (grandson of former owner) and Gregory MacDonald Q.C.
- LW Stores – furniture, hardware, home, grocery, health & beauty, clothing liquidation retailer
- Marks & Spencer – British retailer's Canadian stores first opened 1973 and closed 1999
- Metropolitan – discount department store chain (1908–1997); sister chain of SAAN Stores and Greenberg Stores, later converted to the SAAN name
- Miracle Mart – discount grocery store operated by Steinberg's, defunct 1992; some outlets of the spinoff grocery chain, Miracle Food Mart, were acquired by Dominion Stores
- Morgan's – merged with Hudson's Bay Company
- Murphy-Gamble – Ottawa store, acquired by Simpson's
- Nordstrom Canada – (2014–2023)
- Ogilvy's (Charles Ogilvy Limited) – Ottawa-area chain, merged with Robinson's in the 1980s, defunct 1990s
- Ogilvy's (Jas. A. Ogilvy's Limited) – Montreal department store, founded by James A. Ogilvy (1866), merged with Holt-Renfrew (2019)
- Compagnie Paquet – Quebec City department store; founded in 1850; merged with Syndicat de Québec in the 1970s, closed in 1981
- Peoples – 1914–1995; discount store closed at the same time as its parent company Wise Stores; not to be confused with the Canadian jewelry store chain
- Pollack – Quebec City department store; two stores in Quebec City and one in Montreal; operated from 1915 to 1978
- Prange & Prangeway – H. C. Prange Co.; opened in 1887; chain was acquired by Younkers in the autumn of 1992
- Robinson's (G. W. Robinson Co. Ltd.) – store in Hamilton, Ontario (1899–1992)
- S&R Department Store – discount store in Kingston (1959–2009) and Belleville.
- S.S. Kresge – smaller, downtown locations
- SAAN Stores – discount stores (1947–2008); most of chain's locations and SAAN name bought on asset basis by The Bargain! Shop
- Sam's Club – opened 2005 and expanded to 6 locations; closed in 2009
- Saks Fifth Avenue – high-end department store
- Sayvette – discount department store, defunct 1970s
- Sears Canada – Canadian unit of Sears (1984–2018)
- Sentry – Ontario chain of retail department stores; various locations from Sarnia to Kingston; founded in 1961 by Samuel Joseph Lipson (August 15, 1911 – November 12, 2006). A discount department store with the slogan "Sentry – Guards your dollar", this small regional chain closed in the early 1980s.
- Shop-Rite – catalogue store operated by Hudson's Bay Company, 1970s-1982
- Simpson's – acquired by the Hudson's Bay Company and closed 1991; name now owned by Sears Canada 2001–2008; now owned by 1373639 Alberta Ltd, a Sears Canada shell company
- Simpsons-Sears Limited – name retired and renamed Sears Canada Inc.; 1952–1984
- Spencer's – Western Canada, bought by Eaton's
- Stanley Mills & Co. – Hamilton, Ontario (1888–1985)
- Stedmans or later Stedmans V&S - Chain of small department stores across Canada founded 1907 - today remaining stores are independents.
- Syndicat de Quebec – Quebec City department store; founded in 1867; closed in 1981
- Target – Newfoundland discount variety store chain (1981–1995); never related to the American company
- Target Canada – part of US giant Target Corporation (2013–2015)
- Taylor's – Quebec department store
- Thomas C. Watkins Limited ("The Right House") – department store in Hamilton, Ontario (closed 1983) run by Thomas C. Watkins
- Towers Department Stores/BoniMart – sold to Zellers in 1990 and name retired in 1991, with closure of final stores
- Walker's - Division of Gordon Mackay & Co Ltd. Purchased by Marks & Spencers in the 1970's
- Wise Stores – similar to Hart Stores
- Woodward's – Western Canada; defunct 1993; most stores converted to Zellers, Walmart, and The Bay; its closure sparked a wave of major renovations and reconfigurations in malls across Canada between 1993 and the early 2000s
- Woolco – discount department store, usually in the suburbs, acquired by Wal-Mart in 1994
- Woolworth's – closed Canadian stores in 1994, though some became Woolco (such as the Whitehorse outlet); others that did not close outright were reconfigured and rebranded as The Bargain! Shop
- XS Cargo – discount retailer chain dealing in clearance items; defunct 2014
- Yaohan – single location in Vancouver of Japanese chain in the late 1990s

=== Cuba ===
Defunct:

- El Encanto – operating from 1888 to 1959
- Sears – operating from 1954 to 1960

=== El Salvador ===
- Sears (opened in 2010)
- Siman (opened in 1921)

Defunct:

- Sanborns (2004–2020)
- Carrion (2003–2019)

=== Mexico ===
- Liverpool – biggest department store chain in Mexico
- El Palacio de Hierro – high-end department store
- La Marina
- Sanborns – division of Carso Comercial
- Gran Chapur
- Cimaco
- Sears – division of Carso Comercial
- Woolworth
- Suburbia

==== Defunct ====
- Fábricas de Francia (1878-2019)
- Dorian's (1959-2009)
- Class (-1990)
- JCPenney (-2003)
- Saks Fifth Avenue (2007–2022)

=== Puerto Rico ===
- Tiendas Capri - department store chain, founded in 1963.
- Me Salvé - discount department store chain, founded in 1982.
- Grand Way - discount department store chain, founded in 2013.
- Grand Stores - discount department store chain, founded in 1984.
- JCPenney - national department store chain, established on the island in 1968 at the Plaza Las Américas shopping mall.
- Macy's - national department store chain, established on the island in the year 2000 at the Plaza Las Américas shopping mall, expanded with another store on the island in 2015 at the Plaza del Caribe shopping mall.
- Marshalls
- TJ Maxx
- Burlington Coat Factory
- Walmart
- Costco
- Sam’s Club
- Ross Dress For Less

Defunct:

- González Padín - high-end department store chain, founded in 1884, biggest and oldest local department store on the island until closure in 1995 due to economic problems.
- Es de Velasco - high-end department store chain, founded in 1939, acquired by competitor González Padín in 1991, closed in 1995.
- New York Department Stores - department store chain, founded in 1931, acquired in 1994 by the Melville Corp., most stores turned to Marshalls or closed.
- Pitusa - discount department store chain, founded in 1976, downsized due to economic problems and ultimately closed last stores in 2014 after bankruptcy.
- Topeka - discount department store chain, founded in 1967, downsized due to economic problems ultimately closing in the 2010s.
- Kmart - national department store chain, established on the island in 1964 at the San Patricio Plaza shopping mall, closed last store in 2022 located at the Plaza Las Américas shopping mall.
- Barkers - discount department store chain, established on the island in 1962, ultimately closed in 1984.
- Sears Last store closed on August 31, 2025.

== South America ==
=== Argentina ===
- Coto
- Disco
- Jumbo
- Easy
- Falabella
- La Anonima
- Walmart

Defunct:

- Casa Tía
- Harrods
- Whiteaway Laidlaw

=== Bolivia ===
- Big Sur
- Ketal

=== Brazil ===
Currently trading:

- Daslu
- Lojas Americanas
- Lojas Renner
- Lojas Riachuelo
- Máquina de Vendas

Defunct:

- Mappin
- Mesbla
- Muricy
- Sears

=== Chile ===
Currently trading:

- Almacenes París – belongs to the Cencosud Group
- Falabella – largest and oldest department store in Chile
- La Polar
- Ripley
- Abcdin

Defunct:

- J. C. Penney – two stores in Santiago area (one in Alto Las Condes as a full-store, one in Parque Arauco as an only-furniture store); closed because of poor sales in 1999; converted to Almacenes París and Casa&Ideas stores.
- Gala-Sears – five stores (one full store and four minor stores) in Santiago area; Chilean division of Sears; closed because of poor sales in 1983; converted to Falabella.
- Muricy – two stores in Santiago area; closed because of bankruptcy in 1990; converted to Almacenes París.

Supermarkets and discount stores:

- Jumbo – supermarket chain, belongs to the Cencosud Group
- Líder – supermarket chain, belongs to the D&S Company, a Walmart joint venture

=== Colombia ===
Currently trading:

- Casa Tía
- Falabella – Chilean company; opened first store in Colombia in 2006
- Flamingo
- Makro

Defunct:

- Sears
- La Polar
- Ripley

=== Ecuador ===
- Almacenes Tía
- Almacenes De Prati – department store and retail business; clothing, shoes, accessories, cosmetics, and home goods
- Comandato

=== Paraguay ===
- Nueva Americana

=== Peru ===
Currently trading:

- Falabella
- Oeschle
- Ripley

Defunct:

- Almacenes París – was end operations in 2020
- Saga – sold to Falabella (Chile) and rebranded as Saga Falabella in 1995

Supermarkets and discount stores

- Metro - hypermarket property of Chilean Cencosud
- Plaza Vea – hypermarket property of Supermercados Peruanos
- Tottus – hypermarket property of Chilean Falabella Holdings
- Vivanda – supermarket property of Supermercados Peruanos
- Wong – supermarket property of Chilean Cencosud

=== Uruguay ===
Defunct:

- London París

=== Venezuela ===
Currently trading:

- Graffiti
- Macuto
- TRAKI

Defunct:

- Sears - sold to Organización Cisneros in 1984, rebranded to Maxy's until it became defunct in 1995.

== Asia ==
=== Bahrain ===
Currently trading:

- Marks & Spencer (Manama and Seef, since 1998)

Defunct:

- Debenhams – operating from 1997 to 2025

=== Brunei ===
Currently trading:

- Hua Ho Department Store (Nationwide, since 1947)

Defunct:

- Yaohan – operating from 1987 to 1997

=== China ===
Currently trading:

- Dashang (Nationwide, since 1995)
- Galeries Lafayette (Beijing, Shanghai, and Shenzhen, since 2013)
- Isetan (Tianjin, since 1993)
- Jiuguang (Dalian, Shanghai, Suzhou, since 2004)
- Pacific Sogo (Nationwide, since 1996)
- Parkson (Nationwide, since 1994)
- Shin Kong Mitsukoshi: Shin Kong Place (Suzhou, since 2007)
- SKP (Nationwide, since 2007)
- Takashimaya (Shanghai, since 2012)

Defunct:

- Harrods – operating from 2020 to 2026
- Printemps – operating from 1995 to 2013
- Seiyu – operating from 1988 till closure
- Wing On – operating from 1918 to 1966
- Yaohan – operating from 1995 to 1997
- Whiteaway Laidlaw – operating from 1900s to 1940s

=== Hong Kong ===
Currently trading:

- APiTA (since 1985)
- c!ty'super (since 1996)
- Citistore (since 1989)
- Fortnum & Mason (since 2019)
- Harvey Nichols (since 2005)
- JUSCO (since 1987)
- Lane Crawford (since 1850)
- Marks & Spencer (since 1988)
- Sincere (since 1900)
- Sogo (since 1985)
- Wing On (since 1907)
- YATA (since 2008)
- Yue Hwa (since 1959)

Defunct:

- Daimaru – operating from 1960 to 1998
- Isetan – operating from 1973 to 1996
- Matsuzakaya – operating from 1941 to 1945 and from 1981 to 1988
- New World
- Seibu – operating from 1990 to 2013
- Seiyu – operating till 2008
- Tokyu – operating from 1982 to 1999
- Yaohan – operating from 1984 to 1997

=== India ===
Currently trading:

- Galeries Lafayette (Mumbai, since 2025)
- Lifestyle (Nationwide, since 1999)
- LuLu (Nationwide, since 2013)
- Marks & Spencer (Nationwide, since 2001)
- Mustafa (Chennai, since 2000)
- Pantaloons (Nationwide, since 1987)
- Shoppers Stop (Nationwide, since 1991)

Defunct:

- Debenhams – operating from 2007 to 2015
- Whiteaway Laidlaw – operating from 1900s to 1962

=== Indonesia ===
Currently trading:

- ÆON (Nationwide, since 2015)
- Cahaya (Surabaya and Tangerang, since 1983)
- Central (Jakarta, since 2014)
- Galeries Lafayette (Jakarta, since 2013)
- Lima Cahaya (Banjarmasin, since 1966)
- Lotte (Jakarta, since 2013)
- Marks & Spencer (Nationwide, since 2000)
- Matahari (Nationwide, since 1958)
- Metro (Nationwide, since 1991)
- Mustafa (Bintan, since 2025)
- Ramayana (Nationwide, since 1974)
- Sarinah (Nationwide, since 1962)
- Seibu (Jakarta, since 2007)
- Sogo (Nationwide, since 1990)
- Suzuya (Nationwide, since 1983)
- Yogya (Nationwide, since 1982)

Defunct:

- Centro – operating from 2003 to 2021
- Debenhams – operating from 2012 to 2017
- Galeria – operating from 1992 to 2006
- Harvey Nichols – operating from 2008 to 2010
- JCPenney – operating from 1995 to 1998
- Lotus – operating from 1996 to 2017
- LuLu – operating from 2016 to 2025
- Parisian – operating from 2007 to 2009
- Parkson – operating from 2013 to 2021
- Rimo – operating from 1987 to 2017
- Toko Tio Tek Hong – operating from 1902 to 1950s
- Walmart – operating from 1996 to 1998
- Yaohan – operating from 1992 to 1996/7
- Whiteaway Laidlaw – operating from 1900s to 1945

=== Iran ===
Currently trading:

- Debenhams (Tehran and Mashhad, since 2009)
- Rosha (Tehran)
- Utopia (Tehran)

Defunct:

- Iran Department Store
- Kourosh / کوروش – operating from till 1979

=== Israel ===
- Hamashbir Lazarchan (Nationwide, since 1947)

=== Jordan ===
- Aïshti (Amman, since 2023)

=== Kuwait ===
Currently trading:

- Bloomingdale's (Kuwait City, since 2017)
- Harvey Nichols (Kuwait City, since 2012)
- Marks & Spencer (Nationwide, since ~1999)

Defunct:

- Debenhams – operating from 1999 to 2025
- Villa Moda – operating from 2003 to ~2011

=== Lebanon ===
Currently trading:

- ABC (Nationwide, since 1936)
- Aïshti (Nationwide, since 1989)

Defunct:

- BHV – operating from 1998 to 2020
- Byblos / Printemps – operating from 1960 to 1975
- Fontana
- Orosdi Back – operating from 1900 to the early 1970s

=== Macau ===
Currently trading:

- New Yaohan (since 1997)
- Marks & Spencer (since 2014)

Defunct:

- Galeries Lafayette – operating from 2024 to 2026
- Yaohan – operating from 1992 to 1997

=== Malaysia ===
Currently trading:

- ÆON (Nationwide, since 2012)
- Isetan (Kuala Lumpur, since 1988)
- Marks & Spencer (Nationwide, since ~1996)
- Metrojaya (Nationwide, since 1974)
- Parkson (Nationwide, since 1987)
- Parkwell (Tawau, since 1994)
- Seibu (Kuala Lumpur, since 2023)
- Bukit Indah Supermarket (Ampang Jaya, since 2012)
- Sogo (Nationwide, since 1994)
- MR.DIY (Nationwide, since 2005)

Defunct:

- Daimaru – operating from 1942
- Debenhams – operating from 2003 to 2006 and 2008 to 2018
- Jusco – operating from 1985 to 2012
- LuLu – operating from 2016 to 2025
- Printemps – operating from 1984 to 1987
- Robinsons – operating from 1928 to 2020
- Tangs – operating from 1995
- Kedai Runcit Usaha Kami - operating from 2018 to 2019
- Yaohan – operating from 1987 to 1998
- Whiteaway Laidlaw – operating from 1900s to 1965

=== Oman ===
Currently trading:

- Marks & Spencer (Muscat)

Defunct:

- Debenhams – operating from 2019 to ~2024

=== Philippines ===
Currently trading:

- Isetann (Manila, since 1980)
- Marks & Spencer (Nationwide, since 1997)
- Mitsukoshi (Bonifacio Global City, Taguig, since 2022)
- Robinsons (Nationwide, since 1980)
- Rustan's (Nationwide, since 1952)
- SM (Nationwide, since 1972)

Defunct:

- Debenhams – operating from 2005 to ~2021

=== Qatar ===
Currently trading:

- Galeries Lafayette (Doha, since 2019)
- Harvey Nichols (Doha, since 2018)
- Marks & Spencer (Doha, since 2000)
- Printemps (Doha, since 2022)

Defunct:

- Debenhams – operating till 2025

=== Saudi Arabia ===
Currently trading:

- Harvey Nichols (Riyadh, since 2000)
- Marks & Spencer (Nationwide, since ~2001)

Defunct:

- Debenhams – operating from ~2001 to 2025
- Printemps – operating from 1984 to 2006
- Saks Fifth Avenue – operating from 2001 to 2012

=== Singapore ===
Currently trading:

- Marks & Spencer (since 1994, formerly St. Michael)
- Mustafa (since 1995)
- OG (since 1971)
- Takashimaya (since 1993)
- Tangs (since 1932)
- Yue Hwa Chinese Products (since 1996)

Defunct:

- Beijing Hualian Group - operating from 2007 to 2026, reduced to a boutique after closure of BHG Select Pop-Up Tampines Mall
- Daimaru – operating from 1983 to 2003
- Emporium – operating from 1961 to 1987
- Galeries Lafayette – operating from 1982 to 1986 and 1987 to 1996
- Isetan – operating from 1983 to 2026, reduced to a boutique after closure of Isetan NEX
- John Little – operating from 1842 to 2016
- Kmart Metro – operating from 1994 to 1996
- Lane Crawford – operating from 1994 to 1996
- Metro - operating from 1957 to 2027
- Printemps – operating from 1983 to 1989
- Robinsons – operating from 1858 to 2020
- Seiyu – operating from 1998 to 2007
- Seiyu Wing On – operating from 1994 to 1998
- Shui Hing – operating from 1980 to 1983
- Sogo – operating from 1986 to 2000
- St. Michael – operating from ~early 1970s to 1994
- Tokyu – operating from 1987 to 1998
- Whiteaway Laidlaw – operating from 1900s to 1962
- Yaohan – operating from 1974 to 1997

=== South Korea ===
Currently trading:

- AK Plaza (Nationwide, since 1993)
- Galleria (Nationwide, since 1990)
- Happy (Seoul, since 1990)
- Hyundai (Nationwide, since 1977)
- Lotte (Seoul and Busan, since 1979)
- M (Chuncheon, since 2008)
- NC (Nationwide, since ~1993)
- Shinsegae (Nationwide, since 1963)

Defunct:

- Donghwa – operating from 1945 to ~1950
- Hanyang – operating from 1975 to 1997
- Mitsukoshi – operating from 1930 to 1945
- Printemps – operating from 1988 to 1997
- Sampoong – operating from 1990 to 1995
- Say – operating from 1996 to 2024
- Tapeyung – operating from 1992 to 2021

=== Sri Lanka ===
- Cargills (Colombo, since 1844)
- ODEL (Nationwide, since 1989)

Defunct:

- Whiteaway Laidlaw – operating from 1900s to 1960s

=== Syria ===
- Orosdi Back – operating from 1906 till closure

=== Taiwan ===
Currently trading:

- Dayeh Takashimaya (Taipei, since 1994)
- Hayashi Department Store (Tainan, from 1932 to 1945 and since 2013)
- Ming Yao Department Store (Taipei, since 1987)
- Far Eastern Sogo (Nationwide, since 1986)
- Shin Kong Mitsukoshi (Nationwide, since 1991)

Defunct:

- Isetan – operating from 1992 to 2008
- Lai Lai – operating from 1978 to 2003
- Printemps – operating from 1995 to 2002
- Tokyu – operating from 1975 to 2002

=== Thailand ===
Currently trading:

- Central (Nationwide, since 1927)
  - Robinson (Nationwide, since 1979)
- Diana (Hat Yai and Pattani)
- Emporium (Bangkok, since 1997)
- Lotus's (Nationwide, since 1994)
- The Mall (Nationwide, since 1981)
  - Siam Takashimaya (Bangkok, since 2018)

Defunct:

- Isetan – operating from 1992 to 2020
- JUSCO – operating from 1985 to 2008
- Marks & Spencer
- Nightingale–Olympic – operating from 1930 to 2024
- Printemps – operating from 1994 till closure
- Seiyu – operating from 1996 till closure
- Sogo
- Thai Daimaru – operating from 1964 to 2000
- Tokyu – operating till 2021
- Whiteaway Laidlaw – operating from 1900s to 1950s
- Yaohan – operating from 1991 to 1997

=== United Arab Emirates ===
Currently trading:

- Bloomingdale's (Dubai, since 2010)
- Galeries Lafayette (Dubai, since 2009)
- Harvey Nichols (Dubai, since 2006)
- LuLu (Nationwide, since 1995)
- Marks & Spencer (Nationwide, since 1998)

Defunct:

- BHV – operating from 2017 to 2019
- Debenhams – operating from ? to 2025
- House of Fraser – operating from 2013 to 2021
- Robinsons – operating from 2017 to 2021
- Saks Fifth Avenue – operating from 2005 to 2016

=== Vietnam ===
Currently trading:

- ÆON (Nationwide, since 2014)
- Lotte (Hanoi)
- Takashimaya (Saigon, since 2016)

Defunct:

- Parkson – operating from 2005 to 2023

== Europe ==
=== Albania ===
- Coin (Tirana, since 2010)

=== Austria ===
Currently trading:

- Gerngross (Vienna, since 1879)
- Kastner & Öhler (Nationwide, since 1873)
- Steffl (Vienna, since 1895)

Defunct:

- Gerngroß – operating from 1863 to 1997
- Herzmansky – operating from 1863 to 1997
- Isetan – operating from 1990 to 2003
- Kaufhaus Tyrol – operating from 1908 to 2002

=== Azerbaijan ===
- Barkers – operating from 2015 to 2023
- Harvey Nichols – operating from 2015 to 2015

=== Belarus ===
Currently trading:

- GUM

=== Belgium ===
Currently trading:

- Inno (Nationwide, since 1897)

Defunct:

- Au Bon Marché – operating from 1860 to 1969
- La Bourse – operating from 1872 to 1972
- Marks & Spencer – operating from 1975 to 2001 and from 2015 to 2017

=== Bulgaria ===
Defunct:

- TZUM – operating from 1957 to 1999

=== Czech Republic ===
Currently trading:

- Bílá Labuť (Prague, since 1939)
- Desirred (Prague)
- Kotva (Prague, since 1975)
- Marks & Spencer (Nationwide, since 1996)

Defunct:

- Kmart – operating from 1992 to 1996
- Máj – operating from 1975 to 1992
- My – operating from 2009 to 2019

=== Cyprus ===
Currently trading:

- Era (Nationwide, since 2020)
- Marks & Spencer (Nationwide, since 1960)

Defunct:

- Avenues – operating from 2000 to
- Debenhams – operating from 2004 to 2020
- Ermes – operating from 1971 to 2004
- Woolworth – operating from 1974 to 2003

=== Denmark ===
Currently trading:

- Illum (Copenhagen, since 1891)
- Magasin du Nord (Nationwide, since 1868)
- Salling (Aarhus and Aalborg, since 1906)

Defunct:

- AnVa – operating from 1950
- Daell's – operating from 1912 to 1999

=== Estonia ===
Currently trading:

- Kaubamaja (Nationwide, since 1960)
- Stockmann (Tallinn, since 1993)

Defunct:

- Marks & Spencer – operating from 2009 to 2016

=== Finland ===
Currently trading:

- Sokos (Nationwide, since 1952)
- Stockmann (Nationwide, since 1862)

Defunct:

- Anttila – operating from 1952 to 2016
- Marks & Spencer – operating from 1999 to ? and from 2014 to 2025
- Pukeva – operating from 1933 to 1993

=== France ===
- BHV (Nationwide, since 1856)
- Le Bon Marché (Paris, since 1838)
- Galeries Lafayette (Nationwide, since 1894)
- Nouvelles Galeries (Belfort and Langon, since 1897)
- Printemps (Nationwide, since 1865)
- La Samaritaine (Paris, since 1870)

Defunct:

- Aux Buttes Chaumont
- Decré – operating from 1867 to 1979
- Dufayel – operating from 1856 to 1935
- Lefroid
- Louvre Saint-Honoré – operating from 1855 to 1974
- Magasins Jean
- Magasins Réunis
- Marks & Spencer – operating from 1975 to 2021
- Au Pauvre Jacques
- Au Petit Saint-Thomas
- À la Place Clichy
- Prisunic – operating from 1931 to 2003
- Soisson & James
- Uniprix – operating from 1928 to 1991

=== Germany ===
Currently trading:

- Alsterhaus (Hamburg, since 1912)
- Breuninger (Nationwide, since 1881)
- Carsch Haus (Düsseldorf, since 1915)
- Galeria (Nationwide, since 2019)
- Hema (Nationwide, since 2002)
- KaDeWe (Berlin, since 1907)
- Ludwig Beck (Munich, since 1861)
- Oberpollinger (Munich, since 1905)
- Woolworth (Nationwide, since 1927)

Defunct:

- Bekleidungshaus Otto Werner – operating from 1932 to 2001
- Galeria Kaufhof – operating from 1879 to 2019
- Galeries Lafayette – operating from 1996 to 2024
- Görlitz Department Store – operating from 1913 to 2010
- Horten – operating from 1936 to 2004
- Karstadt – operating from 1881 to 2019
- Marks & Spencer – operating from 1996 to 2001
- Mitsukoshi – operating from 1979 to 2008
- Nathan Israel – operating from 1815 to 1938
- ReKa – operating from 1912 to 1945
- Schocken – operating from 1921 to 1953
- Tietz – operating from 1882 to 1933
- Wertheim – operating from 1875 to 1939

=== Greece ===
Currently trading:

- Attica Department Stores, Attica at Golden Hall
- Fokas Department Stores (closed)
- Hondos Center – mainly cosmetics
- Marks & Spencer
- Notos Galleries

=== Hungary ===
Currently trading:

- Corvin
- Skala

Defunct:

- Marks & Spencer

=== Iceland ===
- Debenhams
- Hagkaup

=== Ireland ===
Currently trading:

- Arnotts
- Brown Thomas
- BT2 – subsidiary of Brown Thomas
- Dunnes Stores
- Shaws Department Stores

Defunct:

- Clerys – closed in 2015
- Darrers
- Roches Stores – acquired by Debenhams

Foreign-Operated:

- Harvey Nichols
- House of Fraser
- Marks & Spencer

=== Italy ===
- Aumai - Chinese department store
- Coin – part of Gruppo Coin
- Coin Excelsior – part of Gruppo Coin
- OVS – part of Gruppo Coin
- Rinascente – part of Central Group (Thailand)
- The Oriental Mall - Chinese department store in Milan
- UPIM – part of Gruppo Coin

Defunct:

- Gamma – acquired by Standa in 1973
- JCPenney – acquired by Rinascente in 1977
- Mas – department store in Rome, closed in 2017
- Standa – acquired by Gruppo Coin in 1998

=== Latvia ===
- Elkor
- Maxima
- Rimi
- Stockmann

=== Lithuania ===
- Akropolis
- CUP
- Europa
- Gedimino 9
- Ozas
- Panorama
- Maxima

=== Luxembourg ===
Currently trading:

- Galeries Lafayette

Defunct:

- Monopol – sold its assets

=== Malta ===
Currently trading:

- JB Stores (Nationwide, since 1983)
- Marks & Spencer (Nationwide, since 1962)

Defunct:

- Debenhams – operating from 2010 to 2021

=== Netherlands ===
Currently trading:

- Berden – department store in Heerlen
- De Bijenkorf
- HEMA

Defunct:

- Maison de Bonneterie – operating from 1889 to 2014
- Metz & Co – operating from 1740 to 2013
- Schunck – operating from 1874 to 1995
- Vroom & Dreesmann – operating from 1887 to 2016
- Hudson's Bay – operating from 2017 to 2019

=== Norway ===
- Christiania Glasmagasin
- Illum
- Eger
- Marks & Spencer
- Paleet
- Steen & Strøm
- OXHOLM

=== Poland ===
- CDT 'Smyk'
- Jabłkowski Brothers

=== Portugal ===
Currently trading:

- El Corte Inglés (Lisbon and Vila Nova de Gaia) – leading Spanish department store
- Marques Soares (Porto and branches)

Defunct:

- Grandella (Lisbon)
- Grandes Armazens do Chiado (Lisbon and branches)
- Marks & Spencer
- Printemps

=== Romania ===
Currently trading:

- Marks & Spencer

Defunct:

- Debenhams

=== Russia ===
Currently trading:

- Gostiny Dvor – established 1785
- GUM
- Lotte Department Store
- Moscow
- The Passage – established 1848
- Petrovsky Passage – established 1906
- TsUM
- TAKE AWAY
- Stockmann - opened 1989

Defunct:

- Galeries Lafayette
- Stockmann

=== Serbia ===
Currently trading:

- Coin – part of Gruppo Coin (Italy)
- Robne kuće Beograd

Defunct:

- Marks & Spencer

=== Slovakia ===
Defunct:

- Marks & Spencer

=== Slovenia ===
- E. Leclerc
- Interspar
- Mercator
- Tuš

=== Spain ===
Currently trading:

- El Corte Inglés – leading Spanish department store chain
- Dunnes Stores (Málaga)
- Galerías Aitana (Calpe)
- Galerías Primero (Zaragoza)
- Bide Onera (Barakaldo)

Defunct:

- Almacenes Al Pelayo (Oviedo)
- Almacenes Arias – closed in 1997
- Almacenes Botas (Oviedo and Gijón)
- Almacenes Madrid-París
- Almacenes Simeón – closed in 1987
- Galerías Preciados – taken over by El Corte Inglés in 1995
- Isetan
- Marks & Spencer – closed in 1996
- Sears – taken over by Galerías Preciados in 1983
- SEPU – the Australian owners closed the remaining four branches in 2002

=== Sweden ===
Currently trading:

- Åhléns (Stockholm)
- Gekås (Ullared)
- Nordiska Kompaniet (Stockholm and Gothenburg)

Defunct:

- Debenhams – closed in 2007
- PUB (Stockholm) – closed in 2014

=== Switzerland ===
- Coop City
- Globus – Zürich, Bern, Luzern, Sursee, Walisellen, Locarno, Dietlikon, Marin, Basel, Chur, St. Gallen, Lausanne and Genève
- Jelmoli – one flagship store located in Zürich
- Loeb (Swiss department store) (Bern and branches) – Biel, Thun and Schönbühl
- Manor (Basel and branches) – used to operate under different brands like Nordmann, Vilan, Rheinbrücke, Placette and Innovazione
- Migros – the largest supermarket chain, but acting as a department store in different shopping centers

Defunct:

- ABM (Au Bon Marché) – discount chain; was a part of the Globus group; closed 2001; some shops were converted to C&A stores
- EPA (Einheitspreis AG) – discount chain; closed 2005; most stores converted to Coop City or closed down

=== Turkey ===
- Beymen (Nationwide, since 1971)
- Boyner (Nationwide, since 1981)
- Marks & Spencer (Nationwide, since 1995)
- Vakko (Istanbul, since 1934)
- Özdilek (Nationwide, since 1971)

Defunct:

- Debenhams – operating from 2006 to 2017
- Galeries Lafayette – operating from 2017 to 2021
- Harvey Nichols – operating from 2006 to 2021
- Orsodi Back – operating from 1855 to 1943
- Printemps – operating from 1988 to 1997 and from 1998 to 2000
- YKM – operating from 1950 to 2012

=== United Kingdom ===
Notable department stores currently operating:

- Frasers (Nationwide, since 2021)
- John Lewis (Nationwide, since 1864)
- Marks & Spencer (Nationwide, since 1884)
- House of Fraser (Nationwide, since 1849)
- Harrods (London, since 1905)
- Selfridges (Nationwide, since 1909)
- Liberty (London, since 1875)
- Harvey Nichols (Nationwide, since 1831)
- Fortnum & Mason (London, since 1707)
- Fenwick (Nationwide, since 1882)
- TK Maxx (Nationwide, since 1994)

== Oceania ==
=== Australia ===
Operating department stores:

- David Jones (Nationwide, since 1838)
- Harris Scarfe (Nationwide, since 1849)
- Harrolds (Sydney, since 1985)
- Myer (Nationwide, since 1900)
- Harvey Norman (Nationwide, since 1982)

Operating discount department stores:

- Best & Less (Nationwide, since 1965)
- Big W (Nationwide, since 1964)
- Dimmeys (Nationwide, since 1853)
- Kmart (Nationwide, since 1969)
- Target (Nationwide, since 1926)
- TK Maxx (Nationwide, since 2017)

Defunct:

- Ahern's
- Anthony Hordern & Sons – operating from 1923 to 1973
- Bairds
- Ball & Welch – operating from 1855 to 1976
- Bennetts – operating from 1926 to 2018
- Boans – operating from 1895 to 1984
- Bolands – operating from 1890 to 1984
- Bright and Hitchcocks – operating from 1850 to 1989
- Buckley & Nunn – operating from 1851 to 1982
- Charles Birks & Co – operating from 1864 to 1954
- Charles Davis – operating from 1847 to 2001
- Charles Moore and Co. – operating from 1884 to 1980
- Cribb & Foote – operating from 1849 to 1985
- Cronshaws
- Daimaru – operating from 1991 to 2002
- Debenhams – operating from 2017 to 2020
- FitzGerald's – operating from 1886 to 1995
- Fosseys – operating from 1926 to 1996
- Foy & Gibson – operating from 1883 to 1968
- Georges – operating from 1880 to 1995
- Gowings – operating from 1868 to 2005
- Grace Bros – operating from 1885 to 2004
- H. A. and W. Goode – operating from 1878
- James Marshall & Co. – operating from 1872 to 1928
- JB Young's – operating from 1914 to 1986
- John Martin's – operating from 1866 to 1998
- Marcus Clark & Company – operating from 1883 to the 1960s
- Mark Foy's – operating from 1885 to 1980
- McWhirters – operating from 1898 to 1955
- Stirling's
- Target Country – operating from 1991 to 2021
- Trade Secret – operating from 1992 to 2017
- Venture – operating from 1970 to 1994
- Waltons – operating from 1951 to 1987
- Western Stores

=== Guam ===
Currently operating:

- T Galleria by DFS (Tumon, since 1995)

Defunct:

- Seiyu – operating from 1973 till closure

=== New Zealand ===
Currently operating department stores:

- Ballantynes (Christchurch, Timaru and Invercargill, since 1854)
- Blackwells (Kaiapoi, since 1871)
- David Jones (Auckland, since 2016)
- Faradays (Auckland, since 2021)
- Farmers (Nationwide, since 1909)

Currently operating discount department stores:

- Kmart (Nationwide, since 1988)
- Postie
- The Warehouse (Nationwide, since 1982)

Defunct:

- A & T Inglis – operating from 1877 to 1955
- Armstrong's – operating from 1880 to 1968
- Arthur Barnett – operating from 1903 to 2015
- Beath's – operating from 1860 to 1978
- Brown Ewing – operating from 1849 to 1960
- Collinson & Cunninghame – operating from 1904 to 1983
- CM Ross – operating from 1883 to 1959
- DIC – operating from 1884 to 1991
- DSA – operating from 1890 to 1966
- T Galleria by DFS – operating from 1997 to 2025
- DEKA – operating from 1988 to 2001
- Farmers Haywrights – operating from 1980 to 1982
- Farrys – operating from 1937 to 2011
- George Court's – operating from 1902 to 1984
- H & J Smith – operating from 1900 to 2023
- Hay's – operating from 1929 to 1968
- Haywrights – operating from 1968 to 1980
- Hazelwoods – operating from 1893 to 2009
- Herbert Haynes – operating from 1861 to 1924
- James Smith – operating from 1866 to 1993
- John Bulleid – operating from 1875 to 1960
- Kirkcaldie & Stains – operating from 1863 to 2016
- McKenzies – operating from 1910 to ~1981
- Millers – operating from 1939 to 1979
- Milne & Choyce – operating from 1867 to 1992
- PDC – operating from 1927 to 1989
- Penroses – operating from 1890 to 1995
- Rendells – operating from 1882 to 2005
- Smith & Caughey's – operating from 1880 to 2025
- Stranges – operating from 1863 to ~1929
- T & J Thomson – operating 1883 to 1961
- Watchorns – operating from 1907 to 1923

=== Northern Mariana Islands ===
- T Galleria by DFS – operating from 1976 to 2025

== See also ==
- List of convenience stores
- List of hypermarkets
- List of supermarket chains
- List of superstores
- Department stores by country
