= List of department stores of Hong Kong =

This is a list of current and defunct department stores in Hong Kong.

== Current department stores ==
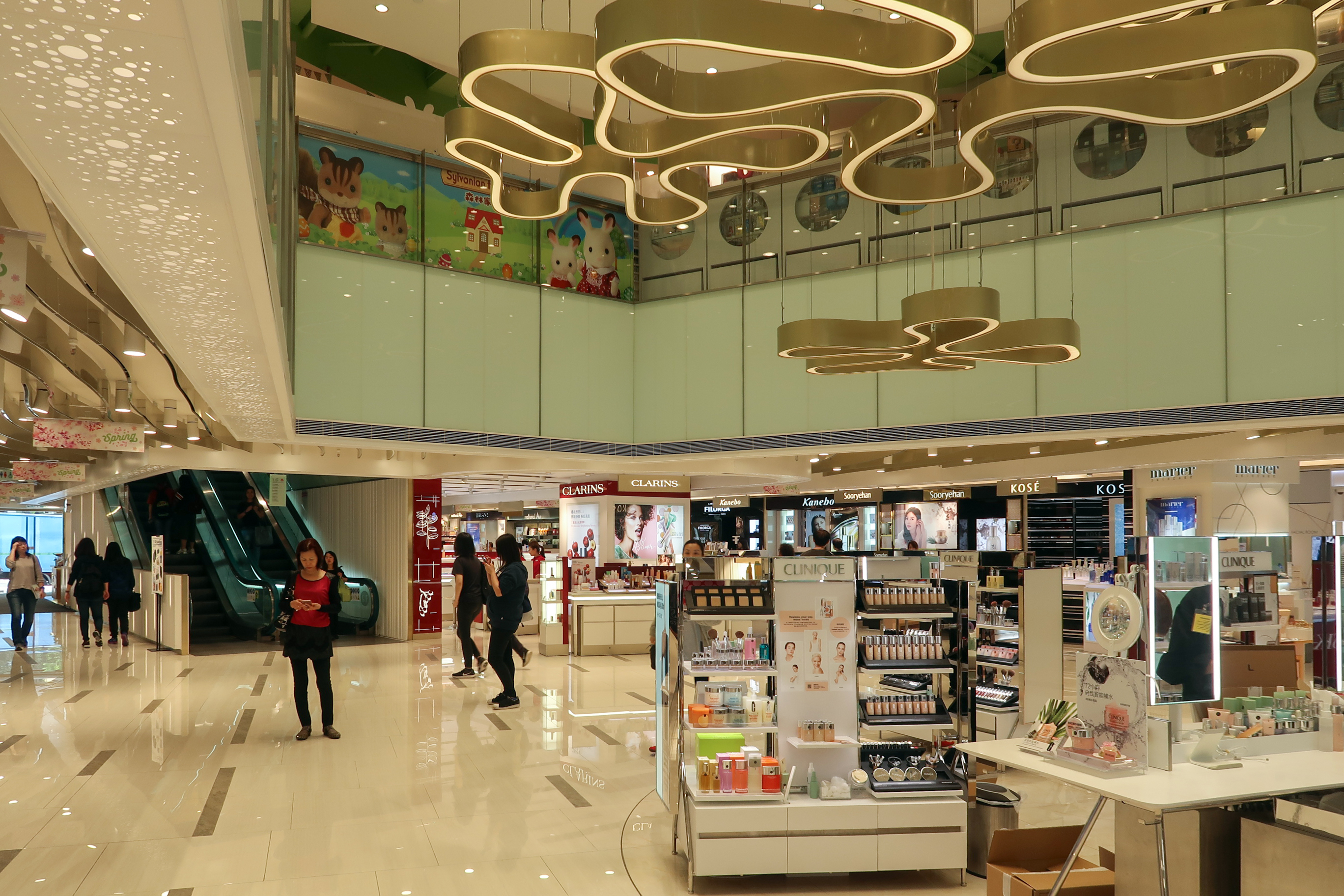
Citistore at Kolour Tsuen Wan II

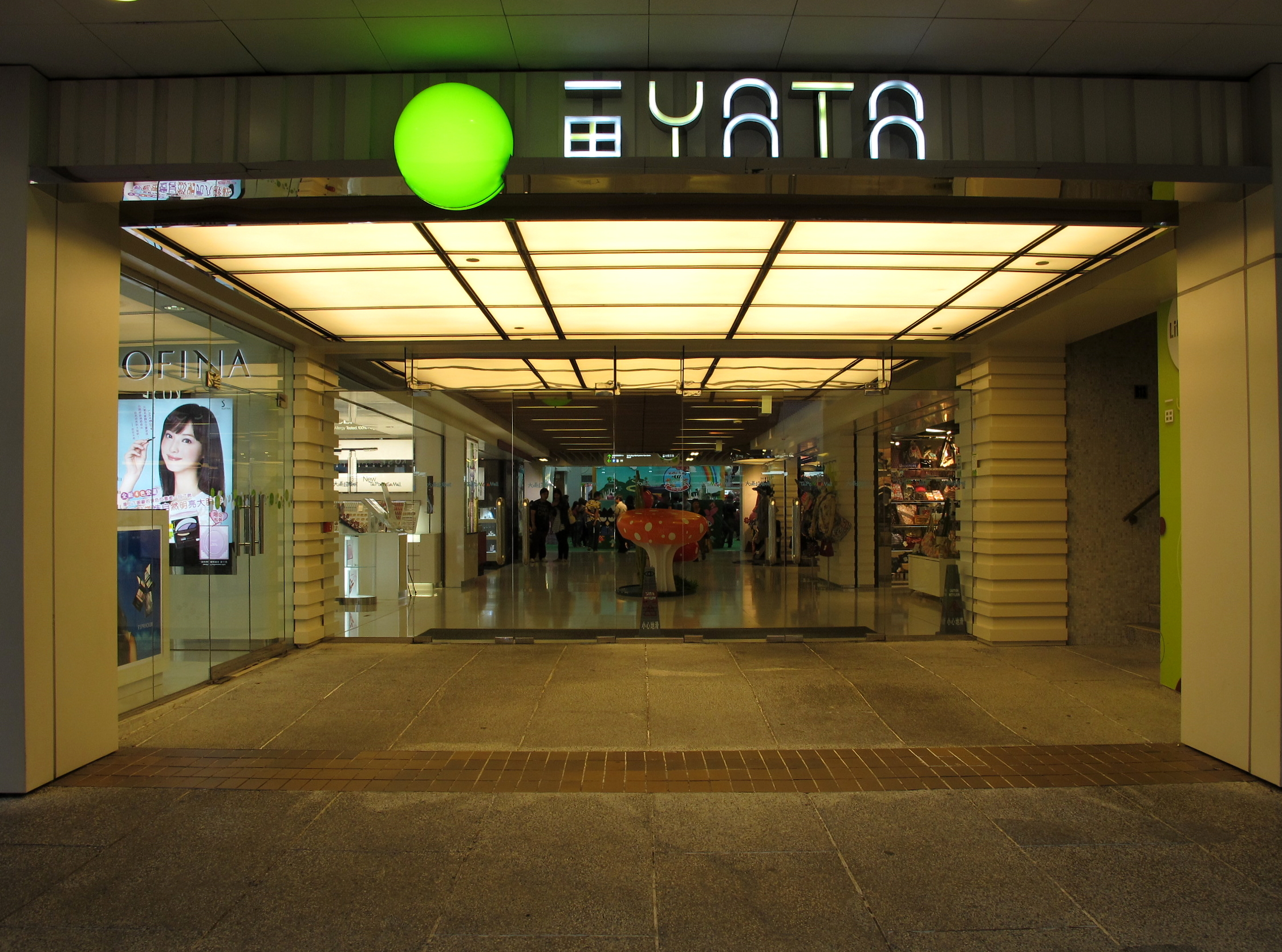
YATA Supermarket

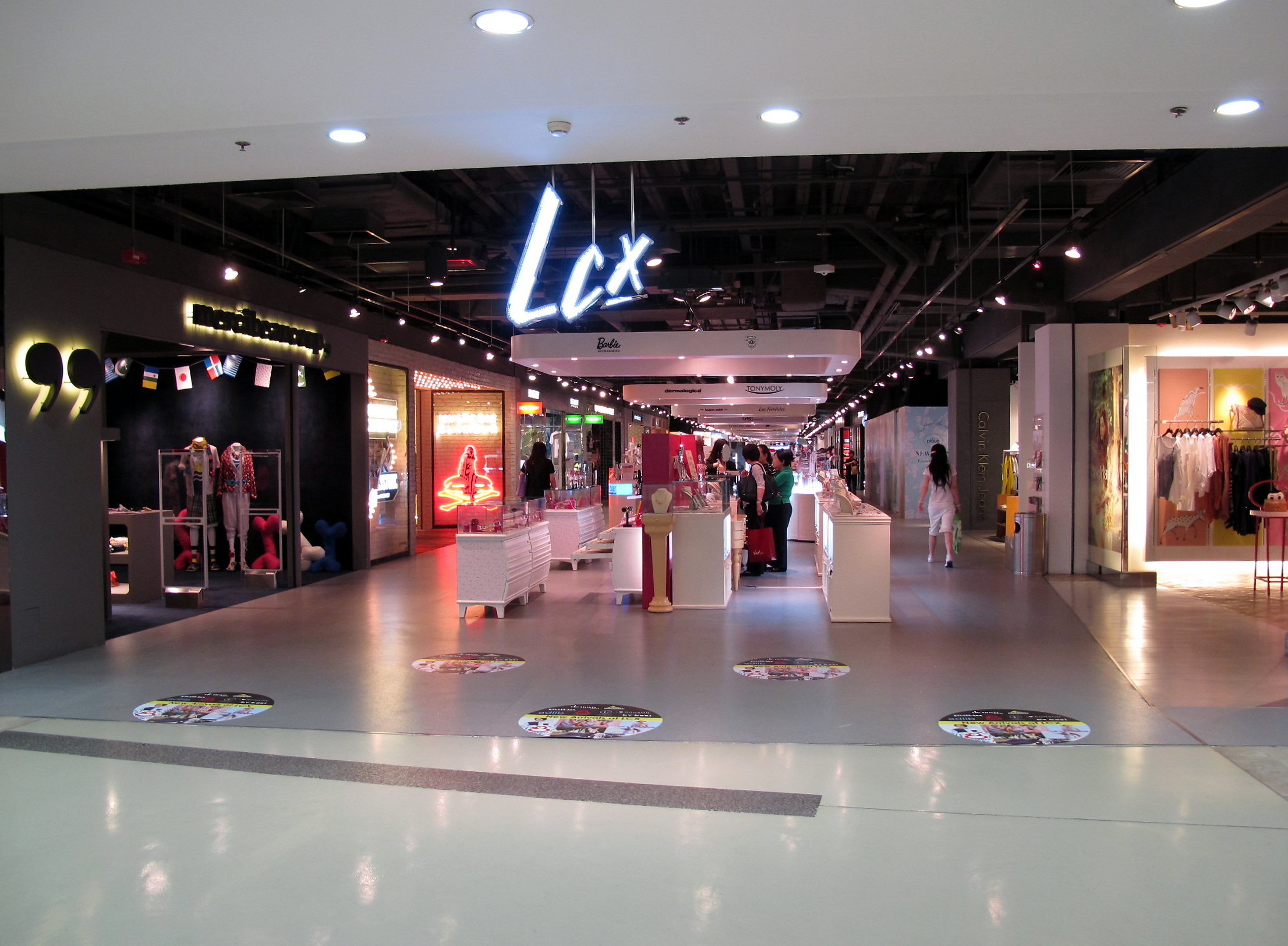
LCX

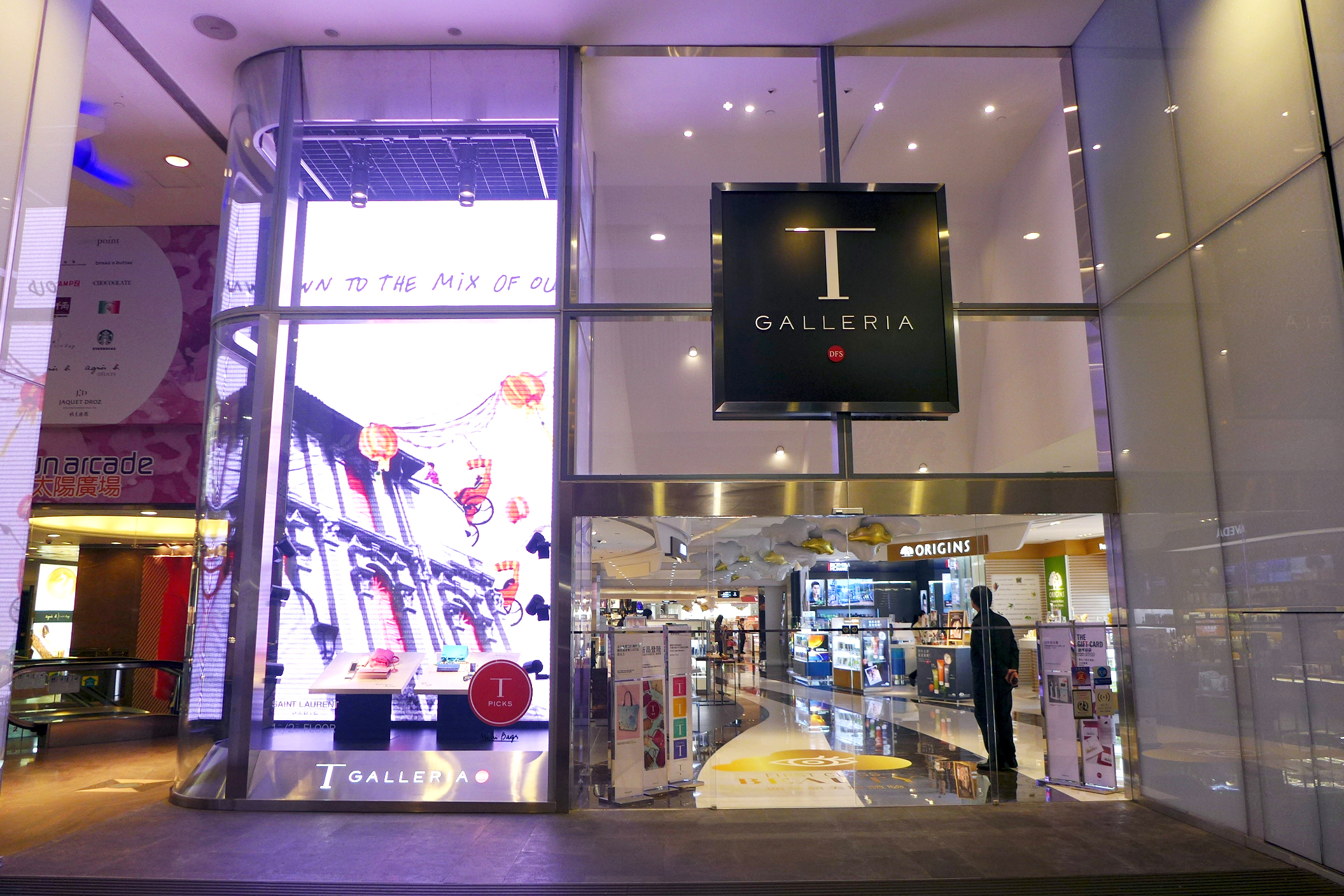
DFS T Galleria

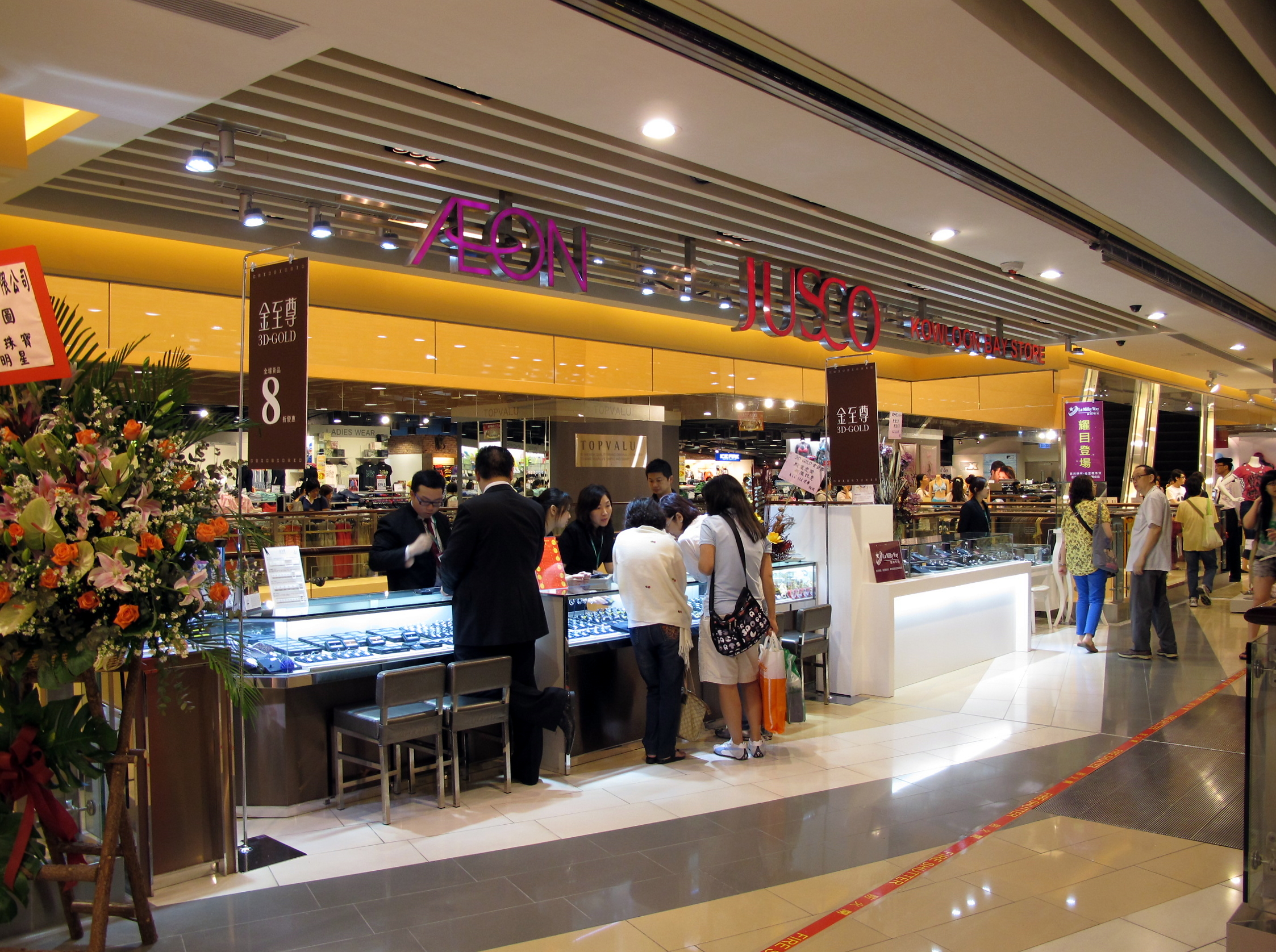
Aeon Store

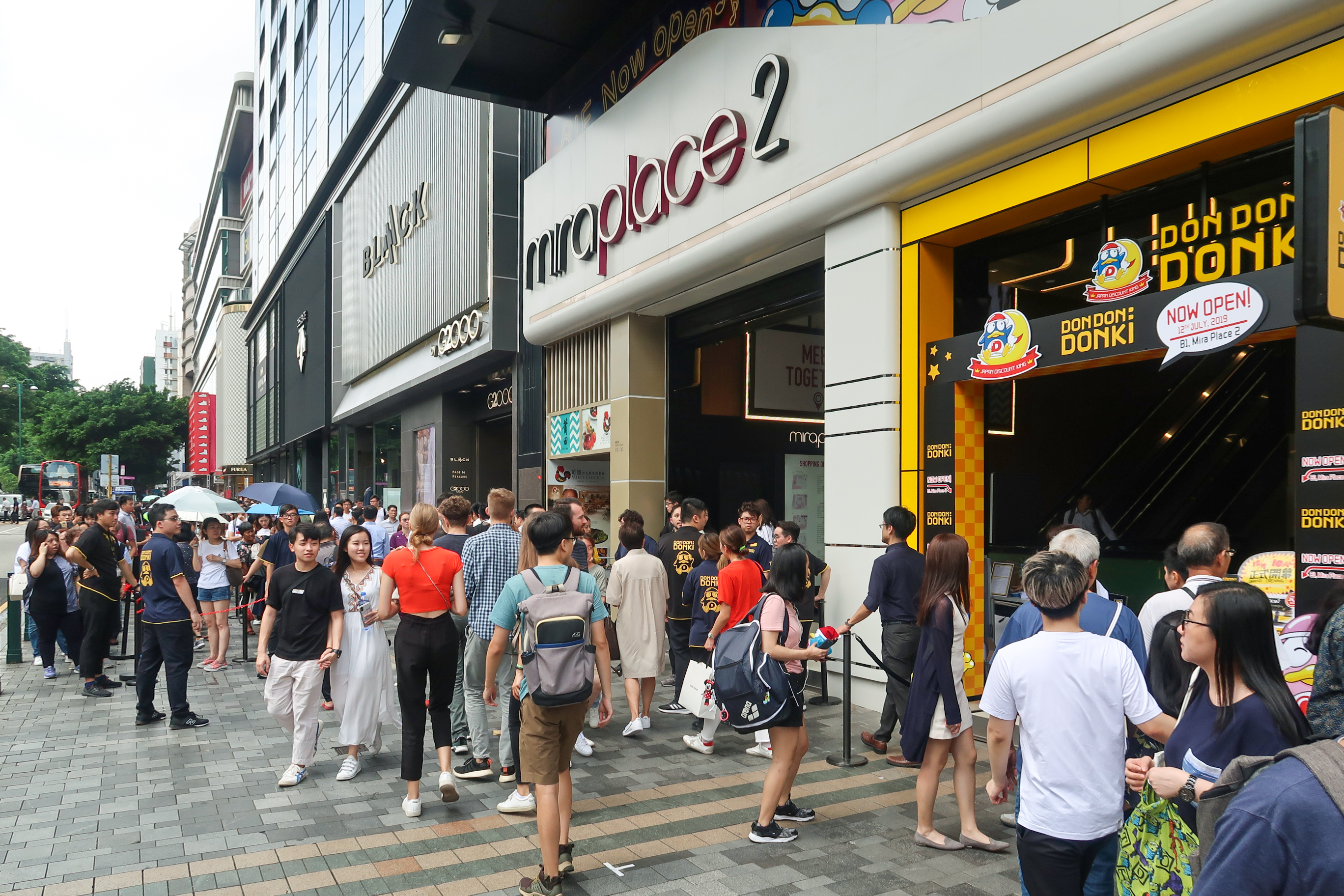
Grand opening of Donki at Mira Place 2, Tsim Sha Tsui

=== Hong Kong-owned ===
- Citistore (1989-)
- Harvey Nichols (1831-) (Note: Formerly British-owned.)
- Kwong Tai Department Store (1984-)
- Lane Crawford (1850-)
- May May Children's Department Store (1965-)
- Sogo Hong Kong (1985-) (Note: Formerly Japanese-owned.)
- UNY (1969-)
- Wing On (1907-)
- YATA Supermarket (1990-)
- Yue Hwa Chinese Products Emporium (1959-)

=== American-owned ===
- DFS Galleria (1960-)

=== British-owned ===
- Marks & Spencer (1884-)
- Next plc (1864-)

=== Chinese-owned ===
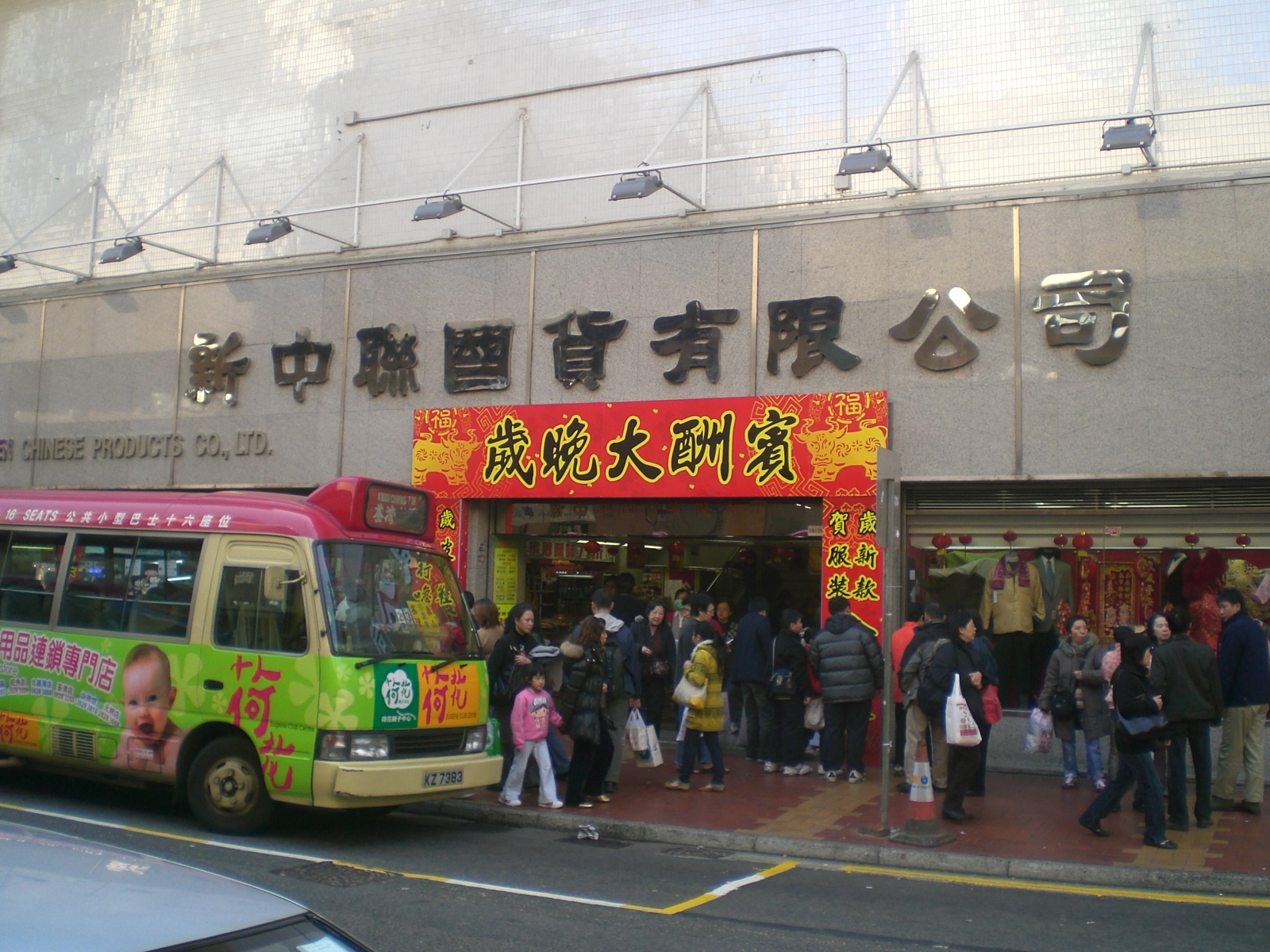
Sun Chung Luen Chinese Products at Hoi Pa Street, Tsuen Wan

- Chinese Arts & Crafts (1961-)
- Chinese Goods Centre Limited (1965-)
- Metropole Department Store (1974-)
- MINISO (2013-)
- Sam Kong Chinese Products (1977-)
- Sincere Department Store (1900-) (Note: Formerly Hong Kong-owned.)
- Stanley Chinese Products (1974-)
- Tai Kong Department Store (1965-)

=== Japanese-owned ===
- Aeon (1985-)
- Daiso (2021-)
- Donki (2019-)
- Matsumoto Kiyoshi (2022-)
- Muji (1991-)

== Temporarily withdrawn department stores ==
- Hong Kong Mitsukoshi (1981-2006)

== Defunct department stores ==
=== Hong Kong-owned ===
- Canada Department Store (?-1981)
- Da Da Department Store (1974-1988)
- Dragon Seed (1946-1999)
- DSC Direct Sale Centre (1997-2015)
- Grand Department Store
- Jam Fair Department Store (1945-1991)
- Little Tiny Department Store
- New World Department Store (1999-2010)
- Pearl City Department Store (?-1985)
- People's Department Store
- Shui Hing Department Store
- Sing Shun Co.
- Tai Yuen Company
- The Sun Company (1912-1973)

=== British-owned ===
- British Home Stores
- Dogwell (1970-1990)
- Emporium Holdings (1961-1998) (Note: Singapore-owned.)
- Whiteaway Laidlaw (Note: Indian-owned.)

=== Chinese-owned ===
- China Merchandise Corp. (1933-1996)
- Chu Kiang Department Store
- Chung Hing Company (1958-2011)
- Chung Kin Company (1955-2013)
- Chung Kiu Chinese Products Emporium (1958-?)
- Chung Kwai Chinese Products Co.
- Chung To Chinese Products Co.
- Chung Wui Department Store
- CRC Department Store (1950-2005)
- Kwok Wah Department Store
- Sun Chung Luen Chinese Products Co.
- Sun Kwong Chinese Products Co.
- Tai Hwa Department Store (1964-1993)
- Wing Fu Department Store

=== Japanese-owned ===
- Daimaru (1960-1998)
- Isetan (1973-1996)
- Matsuzakaya (1942-1945; 1975-1998)
- Hong Kong Seibu Department Store (1989-2013)
- Tamaya Department Store (1942-1945 (Note: Joint venture with Whiteaway Laidlaw.); 1966-1972)
- Hong Kong Tokyu Department Store (1982-1999)
- Yaohan (1984-1998)

=== Taiwanese-owned ===
- Min Sheng Products (1966-1997)

== See also ==
- List of department stores by country § Hong Kong
- List of shopping centres in Hong Kong
