= List of supermarket chains in Ecuador =

This is a list of list of supermarket chains in Ecuador currently operating. As of May 2012, there are 390 supermarkets in Ecuador; 117 of them are located in Guayaquil and 78 are located in Quito.

== Major chains ==
- Corporación La Favorita operates:
  - Supermaxi (35 locations as of 2016)
  - Megamaxi (12 locations as of 2016)
  - Akí (38 locations as of 2016)
  - Gran Akí (17 locations as of 2016)
  - Súper Akí (5 locations as of 2016)
- Corporación El Rosado operates:
  - Mi Comisariato (32 locations as of 2012)
  - Hipermarket (9 locations as of 2008)
  - Mini (11 locations in Guayaquil, as of 2013)
  - TuTi (800 locations as of 2026)
- Tía SA operates:
  - Tía (158 locations as of 2013)

== Other chains ==
- El Rancho (4 locations as of 2012)
- Fernández (7 locations as of 2012)
- La Española (4 locations as of 2012)
- Santa María (6 locations as of 2005)
