= Gala-Sears =

Chilean subsidiary of Sears Roebuck

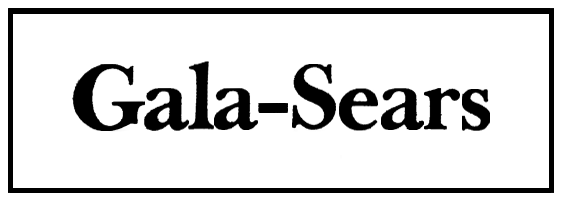
- Company type: Subsidiary
- Industry: Retail
- Founded: 20 May 1980
- Defunct: 16 September 1983
- Headquarters: Santiago, Chile
- Number of locations: 5 (1983)
- Area served: Chile
- Products: Clothing; footwear; bedding; furniture; jewelry; beauty products; appliances; housewares; tools; electronics

Gala-Sears (Grandes ALmacenes de América-Sears) was the subsidiary of Sears Roebuck in Chile, which formally began operations on April 2, 1982, the day after the opening of Mall Parque Arauco. It was one of the first international commercial ventures that retired from the country after few years of failures and economic losses.

== History ==
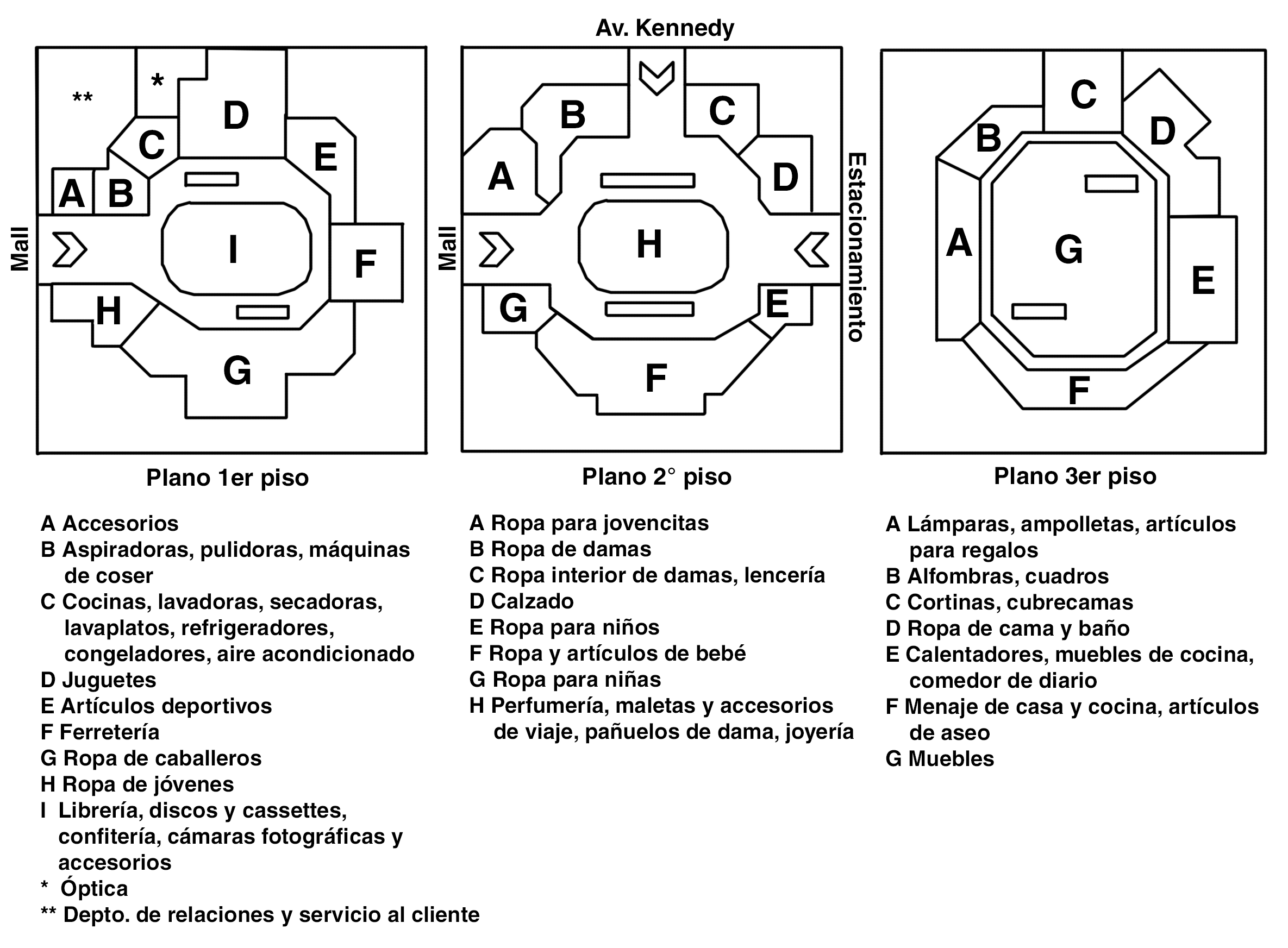
Parque Arauco store map (1982).

On May 20, 1980, the company "Grandes Almacenes de América Gala Limitada" (Gala Ltda.) was constituted, formed by "Sociedad Comercial Fontana Limitada" (linked to the businessman Manuel Ibáñez Ojeda, owner of the supermarket chain Almac and later founder of Distribución & Servicio), "Compañía de Inversiones Golfo Pérsico S.A.", and Jaime Francos Ringer (who subsequently would form the company "Importadora y Comercializadora Francos Limitada"). Its initial capital was of 1 million dollars.

In December 1981, "Comercializadora de Bienes y Servicios de Grandes Tiendas Sociedad Limitada" joined the company. On May 11, 1982, the company was incorporated.

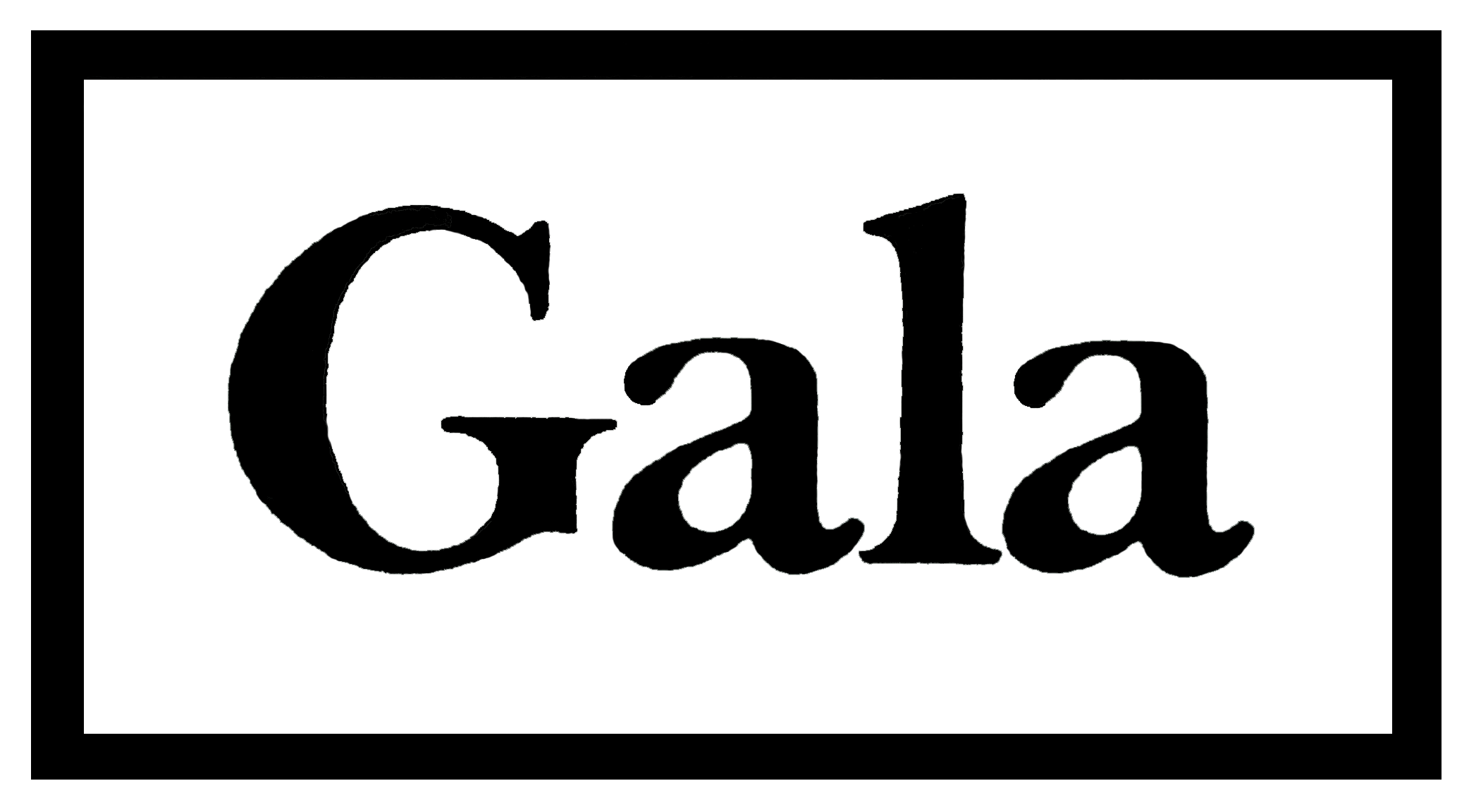
Gala logo, May-September 1983.

Among the novelties presented by Gala-Sears at the time of its opening in Parque Arauco was the distribution of its sections inside the store, generating a hexagonal arrangement that contained the storage spaces in the 4 corners generated by said form within the enclosure built in order to favor a quick replacement of the products; it also introduced the mail order catalog through the possibility that customers acquired the US catalog of Sears to make their purchases at home, and presented one of the first department store credit cards in Chile. During the following months it opened some stores — called «satellites» — of smaller surface and variety of products, installed in the center of Santiago, Providencia and Ñuñoa; all of them were closing at the beginning of 1983, leaving only the store of the Parque Arauco shopping center; the store at Plaza Lyon was later replaced by Almacenes París.

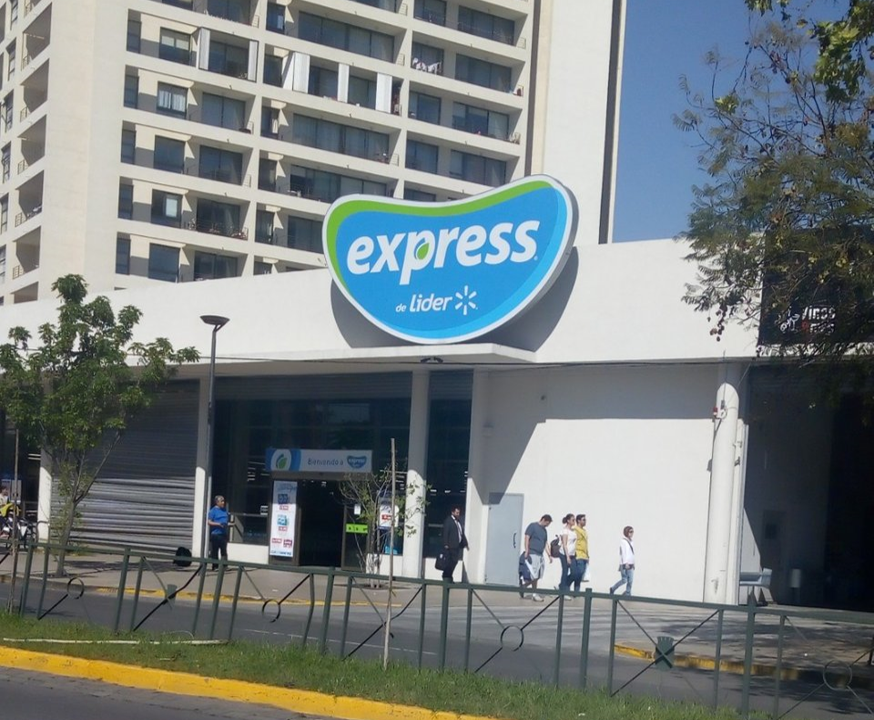
Location of Ñuñoa satellite store, currently occupied by an Express de Líder supermarket.

The store — from May 1983 called simply "Gala", after Sears decided to withdraw from the commercial society — closed its doors definitively on September 16, 1983 because it went bankrupt and did not capture the taste and custom of the Chilean consumer in those years; also, the company was in retreat from the Latin American market. In October of that year Gala disappeared from the retail scene and was replaced by Falabella, which acquired the department store chain as a strategy to reach upper-class.

On 15 June 1983, Gala sued Sears, Roebuck and Co. before the Court of Appeals of Santiago, requesting compensation of ten million dollars for alleged damages due to losses suffered by the Chilean company by associating with the American company. On 9 March 1984, Gala was declared bankrupt by the Ninth Civil Court of Santiago, and in November of the same year the legal actions were ended by an agreement signed between both parties and which reached around 2.5 million dollars.

== Stores ==
- Parque Arauco Shopping Center
- Satellite stores:
  - Santiago Centro: San Antonio 53-L, store 100-C
  - Providencia: Providencia Avenue 2178
  - Ñuñoa: Irarrázaval 2353
  - Plaza Lyon: Nueva Providencia 2235, store 105
