= Yogya Group =

Indonesian retail company

PT Akur Pratama
- Type: Public
- Industry: Retail
- Founded: October 28, 1982; 44 years ago
- Founder: Gondosasmito
- Owner: Budi Siswanto Basuki (CEO)
- Website: www.yogyagroup.com

PT Akur Pratama (trading under the brand name Yogya Group) is an Indonesian retail company. The YOGYA Group operates in the department store and convenience store formats. The company primarily operates in the island of Java, especially West Java (with the exception of Bekasi and Pangandaran Regency), and parts of western Central Java.

== History ==
The original store was founded by Gondosasmito in 1948 as DJOKDJA, and sold batik fabric in Jalan Ahmad Yani, Kosambi, Bandung. Gondosasmito later handed management to his son-in-law, Budi Siswanto Basuki.

The company had its origins as a batik shop on Ahmad Yani street, Kosambi, Bandung, with a shop area of approximately 100 m2 and eight employees. Originally named with the spelling Djokdja, the shop was founded by Gondosasmito and managed simply with his family.

Djokdja was renamed Yogya in 1972, and began offering necessities in a grocery store format. The name DJOKDJA was retained, but the spelling was changed to "YOGYA."

In 1978, Yogya changed its locations in Bandung. In 1982, it opened its first branch designed as a modern department store. It afterwards launched stores such as Griya, Junction, Yogya Express, and Yomart.

On October 28, 1982, coinciding with Youth Pledge Day, its first branch opened, located on Jl. Sunda 60, with a 200 square meter store area and 40 employees. October 28 was subsequently designated as the anniversary of the Yogya Department Store.

In 2024, Budi Siswanto Basuki remained CEO.

== Business brands ==
Former Logo of Yogya Department store

=== Brands ===
- Pasti Hemat
- Yoa

=== Business units ===
Yomart convenience store logo

- Toserba Yogya
- Toserba Griya
- Fatcow
- Chicken Sumo
- Bread.Co
- Foodlife
- Yogya Elektronik
- Hotel anggrek
- Paper co
- Magic Oven
- Magic Pizza
- Yogya Xpress
- Yomart
- Sushi Yo!
- Dapur Yo
- Yo! Ramen
- Ema kitchen

=== Former business units ===
- PO.Jogja Cepat

== See also ==
- List of department stores in Indonesia
