= Muricy (retail store) =

Brazilian chain of department stores

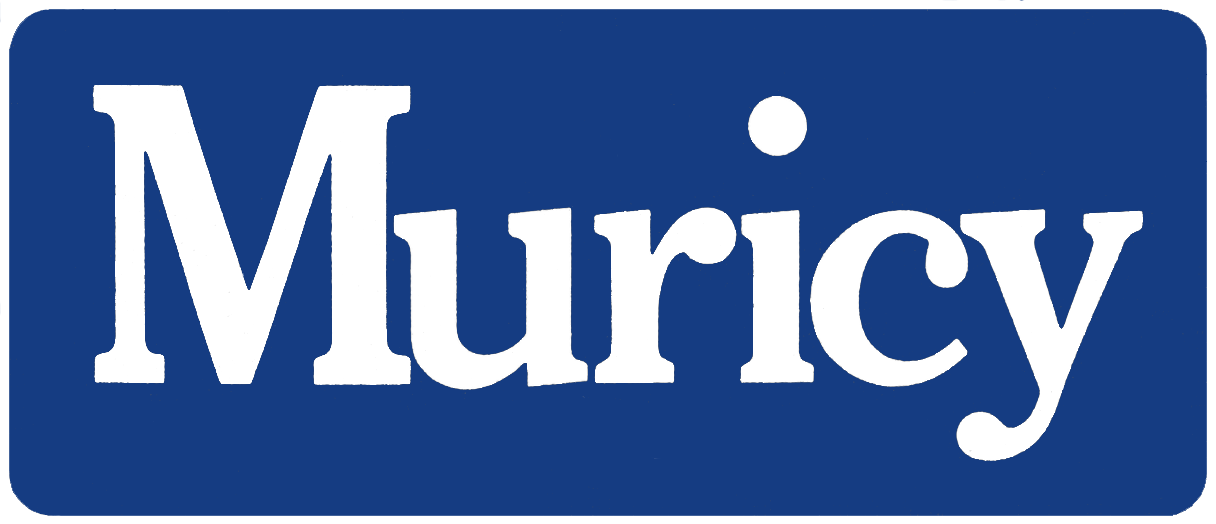
- Company type: Department store
- Industry: Retail
- Founded: 27 January 1976 in Curitiba, Paraná, Brazil
- Defunct: 1998
- Fate: Defunct
- Successor: Pernambucanas
- Headquarters: São Paulo, Brazil
- Areas served: Brazil; Chile
- Products: Electronics, clothing, furniture, gifts
- Owner: Arthur Lundgren Tecidos S.A.
- Parent: Pernambucanas

Muricy was a chain of department stores of Brazilian origin founded in 1976 and dissolved in 1998. In Chile it had operations between 1981 and 1990.

== History ==
=== Brazil ===
Advertisement for the opening of first store at Curitiba, April 1976

The company was founded by Arthur Lundgren Tecidos S.A. in Brazil on 27 January 1976, opening its first store in Curitiba on 9 April of that same year, which had 5 floors (3 of 1500 m^{2} and 2 of 1000 m^{2}) and it was considered the most modern department store of the country, being built specifically for that purpose. Among the novelties introduced by the store was the exhibition and demonstration of the products for sale, and the credit system in installments.

By 1990, Muricy owned stores in Curitiba, São José dos Campos, Ribeirão Preto and Campinas. Muricy's Brazilian stores are now part of the Pernambucanas chain, also owned by Arthur Lundgren Tecidos, which were converted under their current name in October 1998.

=== Chile ===
In Chile, it was incorporated under the name "Sociedad Comercial Muricy Limitada" on 12 February 1981, changing its name to "Sociedad Comercial de Tiendas Limitada" on 7 July 1983. The company had premises in Mall Parque Arauco (opened in April 1982) and Mall Plaza Vespucio (opened in August 1990).

Muricy's Chilean operations ended on 29 December 1990, when the company declared bankruptcy and suddenly closed their 2 stores, formally ceasing operations on 10 January 1991, after which Almacenes París acquired the premises it owned in the two Santiago shopping centers and reopened under their brand in March 1991.
