= Ramayana Lestari Sentosa =

Indonesian retail company

PT Ramayana Lestari Sentosa Tbk
- Type: Public company
- Traded as: IDX: RALS
- Industry: Retail
- Founded: 14 December 1983; 42 years ago
- Founder: Paulus Tumewu
- Headquarters: Central Jakarta, Indonesia
- Area served: Indonesia
- Key people: Agus Makmur (CEO); Paulus Tumewu (President Commissioner)
- Revenue: Rp 2,593 trillion
- Net income: Rp 189,128 billion (2021)
- Total assets: Rp 5,085 trillion
- Total equity: Rp 3,597 trillion
- Owner: PT Ramayana Makmursentosa (55,88%); PT Jakarta Intiland (2,8%)
- Number of employees: 6,112 (2021)
- Website: www.ramayana.co.id

PT Ramayana Lestari Sentosa Tbk (IDX: RALS) is a retail company based in Indonesia. As of 2021, the company operates 86 Ramayana department stores and 82 Robinson supermarkets and 2 Cahaya department stores across Indonesia, the company mostly targets middle to lower income costumers.

== History ==
The company had its origins as a clothing store on Sabang Street, Central Jakarta, founded in the early-1970s by Paulus Tumewu and his wife, Tan Lee Chuan alongside with Agus Makmur, a long-time associate of Paulus. In 1974, The shop later attempted to adopt the convenience store and self-service concept that was becoming popular at the time, with the help of 40 employees. The small shop then grew rapidly. Ramayana would open its second store at Blok M, Jakarta as a part of their expansion plans in 1978 and began to expand their catalogues. In order to transform themselves into a department store business entity, PT Ramayana Lestari Sentosa was established on December 14, 1983. Two years later, in 1985, Ramayana opened its first outlet outside Jakarta.

Ramayana's expansion coincided with the quick growth of the Indonesian economy in the late 1980s; this led to a large-scale expansion campaign by the company. The company also established a new department store that focused on the lower middle class, under the name of Robinson in 1989. However, in its development, Robinson and Ramayana increasingly focused on the same market niche, namely lower middle-class buyers. In the same year, the company have also started selling other products such as household necessities, stationery and toys. By 1992, Ramayana Lestari Sentosa and its two department store brands (Ramayana and Robinson) had established themselves as one of the nation's top retailers, with a turnover in 1990 reaching Rp 126 billion, more than 2,500 employees, and has 20 outlets (16 Ramayana, 4 Robinson) spread across 8 cities. By 1995, Ramayana and Robinson had 45 stores in 15 cities, with a total area of 193,000 square meters.

On July 24, 1996, a record was set by making PT Ramayana Lestari Sentosa a public company, by releasing 80 million of its shares. After going public, Paulus Tumewu still owned approximately 63.2% of the shares. That year, Ramayana and Robinson had a total of 45 outlets and recorded revenue of Rp 630.6 billion and profit of Rp 43.2 billion. To expand its market, the company had targeted repositioning of Robinson into a department store for the upper middle class, with the two initial outlets targeted at Plaza Depok and Plaza Tangerang. Then, on November 1, 1997, PT Ramayana Lestari Sentosa also acquired two department store and supermarket chains owned by the Pembangunan Jaya Group, namely Cahaya Department Store (PT Jaya Krisan Cahaya, 10 stores) and Jayasera (PT Marga Jaya Manggala Pratama, 6 stores) for Rp 30.1 billion. After the acquisition, Ramayana Lestari Sentosa owned approximately 76 stores. In the same year, Ramayana also opened a store in Bali, and plans to collaborate with the French company, Conforama.

The financial crisis that hit Indonesia in late 1997 put pressure on the company's performance. Ramayana and its three sister companies (Robinson, Jayasera, and Cahaya) were forced to close several stores and reschedule previously targeted expansion plans. Pressure increased during the May 1998 riots, when many Ramayana stores were vandalized and looted by rioters (as many of their stores are located within working-class neighborhoods). As a result, the number of Ramayana and its three sister stores dropped to 64. However, following management restructuring, began re-expanding and opening new outlets shortly afterwards. Taking lessons from the riots, the company now focuses its outlets in shopping centers, rather than building its own stores. By 2002, Ramayana and its sister companies had 81 outlets, 18 of which were owned by the company, which employs 19,000 employees. The previous year, Ramayana won an award as one of the best retailers in Asia and can achieve a net profit of up to IDR 300 billion. In 1999, the company opened its first Ramayana store on the island of Sumatra, in Bandar Lampung. It was followed by its first Ramayana store on the island of Kalimantan, in Banjarmasin, in 2000. It also opened its first Ramayana store on the island of Sulawesi, in Makassar, in 2002.

Expansion continued in the 2000s, with the company starting to sell electronics and opening restaurants in Ramayana stores in 2005. In 2010, the company opened its first Ramayana store in Papua, in Abepura, bringing its total number of stores to 115 in 42 cities and employing 17,800 people. On September 1, 2014, Ramayana entered into a partnership with Dutch retailer SPAR to operate its supermarket chain. Starting that year, several Ramayana and Robinson Supermarket outlets were converted to SPAR stores. This partnership was initially expected to boost Ramayana Lestari Sentosa's revenue by 20-30% over the next few years, with the opening of approximately 30 new outlets, plus the conversion of former Ramayana and Robinson outlets. However, the agreement expired in 2017, as both companies opted not to continue their partnership, citing consolidation. That same year, Ramayana also expanded its business by opening a "Ramayana Prime" store in Jatinegara, East Jakarta, targeting middle class shoppers with its own culinary and entertainment area. In April 2018, the company opened a second Ramayana Prime store in Cibubur. In addition, since 2016, Ramayana has been trying to expand its business by opening online stores on several sites, such as Tokopedia and Shopee.

Entering the mid-2010s, pressure began to weigh on the company's business (and retail in general), forcing it to streamline and close several stores in several regions. In 2017, 16 supermarket stores were closed, and in 2020-2021, Ramayana closed 19 stores.

The closure of the store was also accompanied by layoffs of employees on several occasions. This was due to the COVID-19 pandemic, which reached Rp 138.8 billion and a decrease in revenue from Rp 5.59 trillion to Rp 2.57 trillion in 2020.

As a result, the number of Ramayana stores (and its two siblings, Robinson and Cahaya) dropped from 119 in 2017 to 102 in 2021. However, entering 2022, the company began to record performance improvements and successfully opened new stores, such as in Semarang.

== Brands ==
=== Ramayana ===
Its main brand of department stores, the company currently operates 86 outlets across the country.

=== Robinson ===
Originally spin-off of the Ramayana brand, the company currently operates 82 Robinson outlet across the country, in addition to 2 stand-alone supermarkets.

=== Cahaya ===
Secondary brand of department stores, unlike the previous two brands, the Cahaya brand mostly targets middle-class customers, the company currently operates 2 outlets within the city of Tangerang and Surabaya.
