= Thomas C. Watkins =

Canadian writer

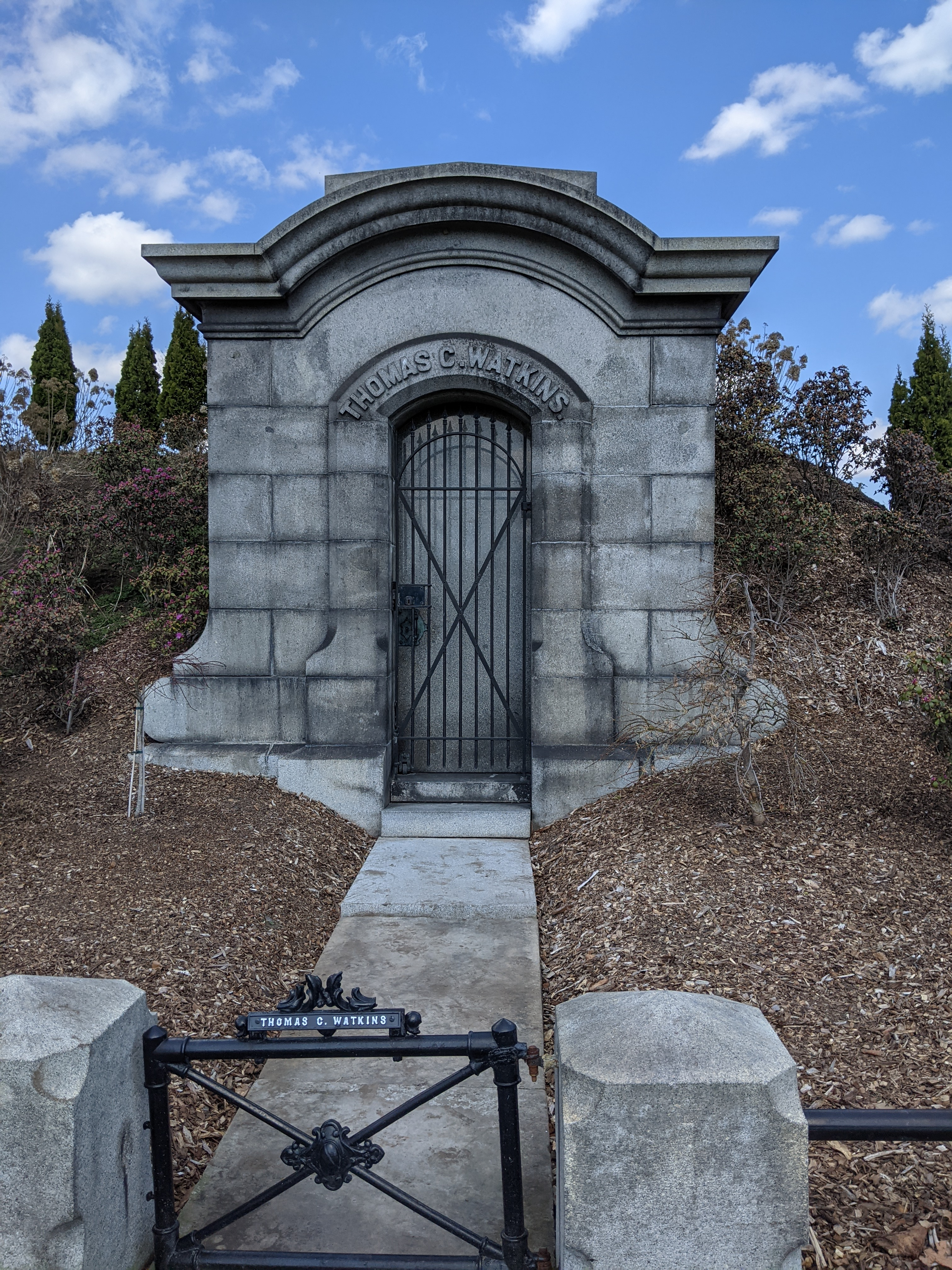
Vault of Canadian author Thomas C. Watkins

Thomas C. Watkins (c. 1818–1903) was a Canadian writer. He wrote about the benefits of prohibition and the negative effects of alcohol on the person and on society. Watkins was an advocate for a "dry" Canada. He wrote that from a religious point of view alcohol and drinking was a sin.

== Written works ==
His writing includes:

- The Effects of Alcohol on the Human System
- Liquor and Labour: The Effects of the Liquor Traffic on the Working Classes
- The History of Intemperance
- The Dietetics of Temperance
- Canada Must have Prohibition
- Alcohol as a Medicine
