= Suzuya Group =

Department store chain in Indonesia

- Type: Private
- Genre: Department Store, Supermarket
- Founded: 1983
- Founder: Aldes Maryono
- Headquarters: Medan, Indonesia
- Area served: Sumatra

Suzuya is a chain of department stores with numerous branches across Indonesia, primarily in North Sumatra, Aceh, West Sumatra, and Riau. These outlets primarily sell a variety of food, clothings, beverage, and various other household goods.

The company's name was taken from the Japanese word "Suzuya" (lit: Jingling wood) and was Founded in 1983 in Medan, North Sumatra, By Aldes Maryono, Suzuya currently operates over 22 outlets, mostly in Sumatra, across Indonesia.

== Stores ==
Provinsi	Locations		Alamat
North Sumatra	Suzuya Superstore	Kampung Baru, Medan	Jl. Brigjen Katamso No.710, Kampung Baru, Medan, North Sumatra
North Sumatra	Suzuya Superstore	Rantau Prapat	Jl. Ahmad Yani No.125-127 Rantau Prapat, North Sumatra
North Sumatra	Suzuya Superstore	Binjai	Jl. Dr. Sutomo Binjai, North Sumatra
North Sumatra	Suzuya Superstore	Pematang Siantar	Jl. Dr. Sutomo No.24 Pematang Siantar, North Sumatra
North Sumatra	Suzuya Marelan Plaza Medan		Jl. Marelan raya no. 207 Medan, North Sumatra
North Sumatra	Suzuya Mall	Johor, Medan	Jl. Karya Wisata No.65, Johor, Medan, North Sumatra
North Sumatra	Suzuya Mall	Rantau Prapat	Jl. Sisingamangaraja Rantau Prapat, North Sumatra
North Sumatra	Suzuya Tanjung Morawa, Deli Serdang		Jl. Medan-Lubuk Pakam Dsn IV Km 17.5 Tanjung Morawa, Deli Serdang, North Sumatra
Aceh	Suzuya Swalayan Kampung Baru, Banda Aceh		Jl. Diponegoro Lt.3 Shopping Center, Kampung Baru, Banda Aceh
Aceh	Suzuya Mall	Banda Aceh	Jl. Teuku Umar, Lamteumen Timur, Jaya Baru, Banda Aceh
Aceh	Suzuya Mall	Bireuen	Jl. Malikus Saleh Simpang Empat, Bireuen, Aceh
Aceh	Suzuya Superstore	Lhokseumawe	Jl. Samudera Baru, Simpang Empat, Banda Sakti, Lhokseumawe, Aceh
Aceh	Suzuya Superstore	Langsa	Jl. Ahmad Yani No.2, Paya Bujok Seuleumak Langsa Baro, Langsa, Aceh
Riau	Suzuya Department Store Senapelan Plaza Pekanbaru		Lt.3, Jl. Teuku Umar, Pekanbaru, Riau
Riau	The Central Pasar Kodim Pekanbaru		Jl. Jend. Ahmad Yani, Kota Baru, Kota Baru, Pekanbaru, Riau
Riau	Suzuya Mall Bangkinang		(coming soon)
Riau	Suzuya Superstore	Bagan Batu, Rokan Hilir	Jl. Jend. Sudirman, Bagan Batu, Rokan Hilir, Riau
West Sumatra	Suzuya Superstore	Rocky Plaza Hotel Padang	Jl. Permindo No.40, Padang, Sumatera Barat
West Sumatra	Suzuya Trans World Castle Solok		(coming soon)
