= Rimo International Lestari =

Indonesian company

PT Rimo International Lestari Tbk
- Type: Public
- Traded as: IDX: RIMO
- Industry: Property
- Founded: 1986
- Founder: M. R. Harjani
- Headquarters: Indonesia
- Key people: Teddy Tjokrosaputro, CEO
- Revenue: Rp 283,4 Billion (2017), Rp 509 Billion (2018) ▲
- Net income: Rp 59,7 Billion (2017), Rp 112 Billion (2018) ▲
- Number of employees: 173 (2018)
- Website: www.rimointernational.com

Rimo International Lestari (IDX: RIMO) is a company headquartered in Jakarta, which was founded in 1987.

The company previously operated as a clothing retailer (department store) under the name Rimo and was founded and owned by Mohanlal Ramchand Harjani, an Indonesian businessman of Indian descent. And his wife, Rita, the name itself was an acronym of both of their names. The company's previous name was Rimo Catur Lestari. However, Rimo's department store business has been declining in the early 2000s, especially with waves of foreign department stores entering the Indonesian market and emergence of numerous other local department stores.

The company soon began closing its stores starting in 2006, beginning from the stores in Taman Anggrek Mall, Bekasi, Solo, Manado until the last one to close was a store in the Palmerah and Pasar Baru areas, Jakarta before switching its business lines into property.

The company changed its name in 2014.

In 2017, the company held a rights issue to acquire shares in Hokindo Properti Investama and indirectly transferred its shares ownership to Benny Tjokrosaputro.

In 2019, the company had intended to sell 49.99% of Hokindo Properti shares to Mayapada's Maha Properti Indonesia, but due to the Jiwasraya case involving the Tjokrosaputro family, the share sale agreement was canceled.

The company was listed on the Indonesia Stock Exchange in 2000.

== Projects ==
- Southills, South Jakarta
- Gangnam Townhouse, South Jakarta
- Gajasa Agri Estate dan Samota Business District and Villa Resort, Sumbawa
- Batukuda CBD, Serang
- Mal Matahari, Maestro Hotel and Kota Olympia, Pontianak
- Rupa Rupi Handcraft Market, Bandung
- Puncak Golf and Resort, Cianjur
- Puuwatu Hills, Kendari
- CitraLand Manggar, Balikpapan - kerjasama dengan grup Ciputra
- Permata Hijau, Banjarmasin
- Novotel Hotel, Serang
