= Shin Kong Place (Suzhou) =

Shopping mall in Suzhou, China

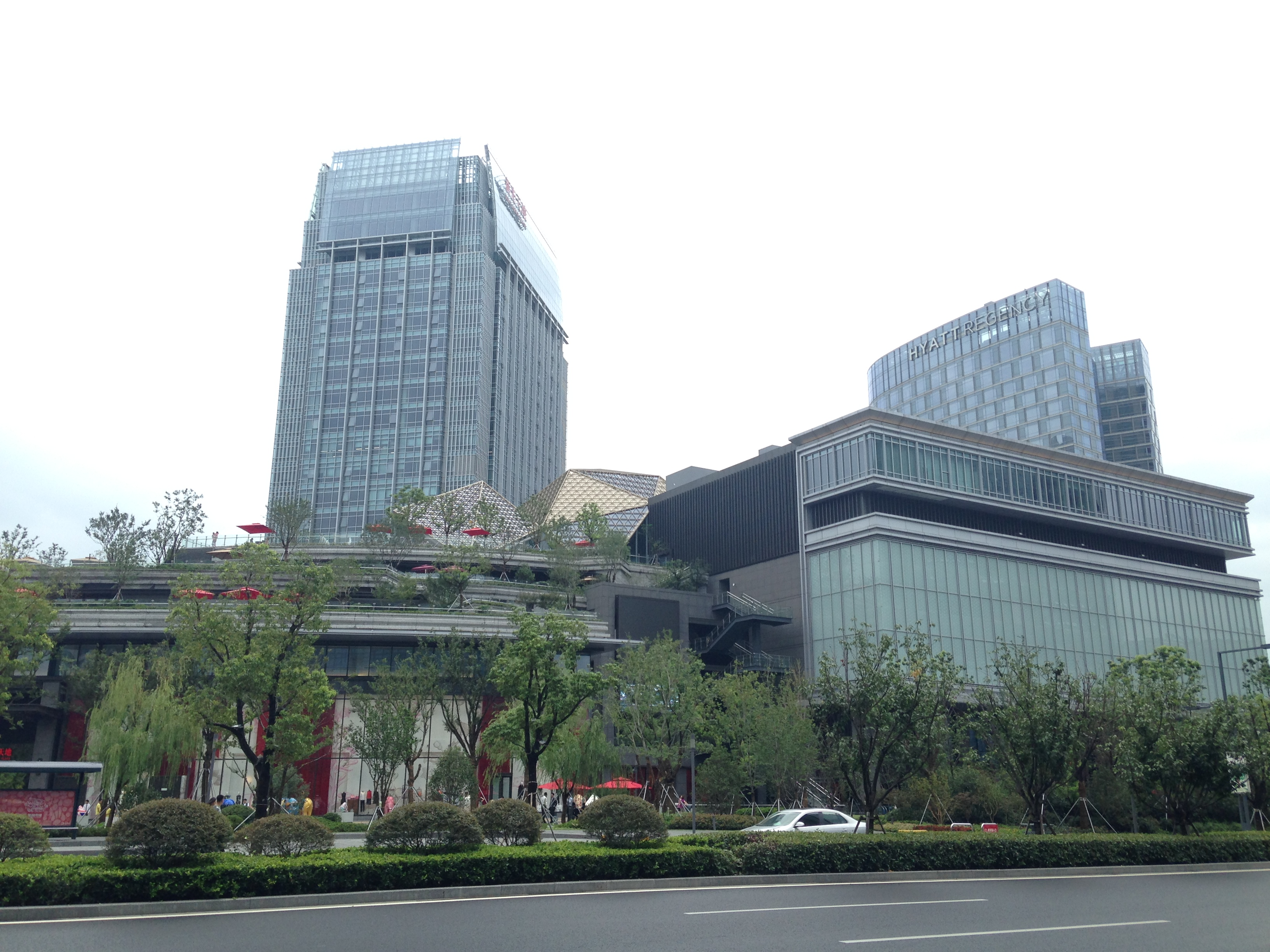
- Shin Kong Place Suzhou
- Location: Suzhou

Shin Kong Place is a mall located at the intersection of Suzhou Dadao Dong and Huachi Jie in Suzhou's China–Singapore Suzhou Industrial Park, in China.
