= ReKa =

Department store building in Dresden, Saxony, Germany

Coordinates: 51°02′48.1″N 13°44′14.2″E

The Residenz department store, popular under the acronym ReKa, was a department store in the style of reform architecture in Dresden-Altstadt Waisenhausstraße 16, on the corner of Prager Straße. Aryanized under the Nazis, the building was burned out in 1945 and demolished in 1950/1953.

In 1993/1995, the Karstadt department store was built on the same site.

== Building history ==
The Residenz department store, the "Reka" was considered the "first significant department store building in Dresden in glass and concrete". Built in 1912 on Prager Straße, opposite the Viktoriahaus, and designed by the Leipzig architect Emil Franz Hänsel, it was modelled on the Wertheim department store in Berlin.

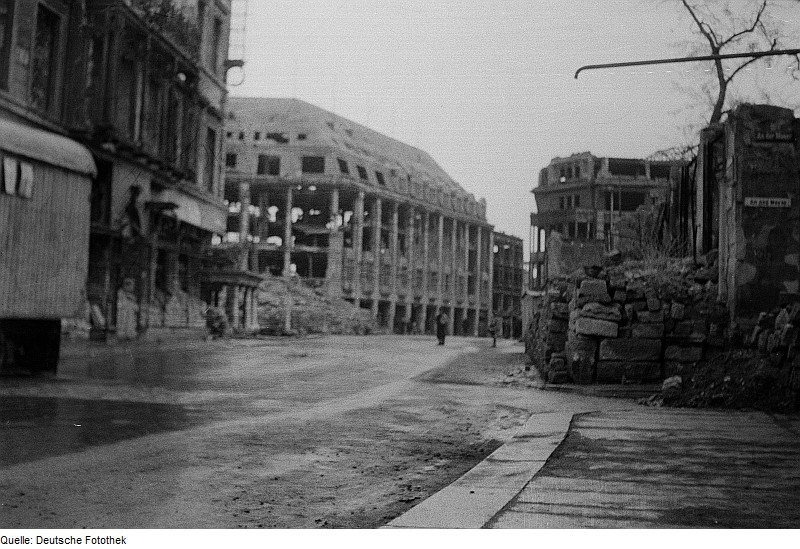
View from the lake road to the ruins of the "Reka" 1947

The four-story building was structured by sculptural concrete pillars extending vertically over several stories with large glass surfaces in between. The second floor had bay windows with decorative ornamentation, so-called "window compartments," inserted between the pillars, reminiscent of the Dresden tradition. Above the cornice, which consisted of pearl bar, a lightly ornamented echinus, and the eaves gutter, sat arched dwarf houses in the hipped roof. The horizontal bay windows and dwarf houses visually balanced the vertical emphasis provided by the piers.

The interiors were white, the ceilings were decorated with stucco and the mighty columns were covered with wood. The building had three elevators, each of which could hold ten people.

== Retail spaces ==
The department store was opened on the afternoon of October 12, 1912. The approx. 500 employees offered its assortment on four floors in 55 sales departments. Goods were delivered via a driveway in Waisenhausstraße.

In keeping with the new department store trend of the time, all items were priced using price boards. While the first floor offered, among other things, haberdashery, men's goods, perfumery and stationery, the second floor offered women's fashions, corsets and shoes. The second floor offered a very wide range of goods - from sporting goods and toys to books, watches, photographic items, electrical goods and interior decoration. This floor also housed a refreshment room. Finally, the top floor housed the entire range of household items available at the time, as well as a wide-ranging food department, which included colonial produce, meat and sausages from an in-house butcher's shop, fruit and vegetables, and live fish swimming in a pool.

== Other ==
- The department store appears in several books and novels. The novelist Victor Klemperer mentions in his diaries the purchase of the book Escape in the "Reka" written by the Italian anti-fascist Francesco Fausto Nitti (1899-1974) at the beginning of 1933.
- The painter Albert Wigand worked as a window dresser at Reka from 1930 to 1943 to earn a living.
- The rubble of the Residenz department store was cleared as part of the large-scale debris removal in 1950, [6] after which the area remained a green space until the start of the new department store construction of the Karstadt department store in the early 1990s. A "teacher's house" planned here in the 1960s, which would have at least touched the site, did not get beyond a foundation stone being laid in the early 1970s; this was then buried again and quietly removed in 1988.

== Literature ==
- Das alte Dresden. Geschichte seiner Bauten. E. A. Seemann. 1994. ISBN 3-363-00007-3.
- Abschied vom alten Dresden. Verluste historischer Bausubstanz nach 1945. Forum Verlag. 1993. ISBN 3-86151-047-2.
- Ulrich Hübner et al.: Symbol und Wahrhaftigkeit. Reformbaukunst in Dresden. Verlag der Kunst Dresden Ingwert Paulsen jun., Husum 2005, ISBN 3-86530-068-5.
