= Ripley S.A. =

Chilean management company

Ripley Corp S.A.
- Company type: Sociedad Anónima
- Traded as: BCS: RIPLEY
- Industry: Retail & Financial services
- Founded: 1956
- Headquarters: Santiago, Chile
- Areas served: Chile; Peru
- Key people: Felipe Lamarca Claro, (Chairman); Claudio Calderón Volochinsky, (CEO)
- Products: Department Store; Banking; Credit; Shopping mall
- Revenue: ▲US$ 2.5 billion (2012)
- Net income: ▼US$ 77.1 million (2012)
- Website: www.ripley.cl

Ripley S. A. is a Chilean department store, financial services, and shopping malls management company. Ripley is headquartered in Santiago, Chile and also has operations in Peru since 1997 and formerly operated in Colombia since 2014 to 2016.

Ripley has 67 stores, with 38 in Chile and 29 in Peru. In the financial sector it operates a bank under the Banco Ripley brand and manages credit lines through its Tarjeta Ripley cards. The company manages six shopping malls, three in Chile and four in Peru.

Ripley's main competitors are Paris, Falabella and Hites all operating similar shopping and lending ventures in the Chilean market.
