= Cimaco =

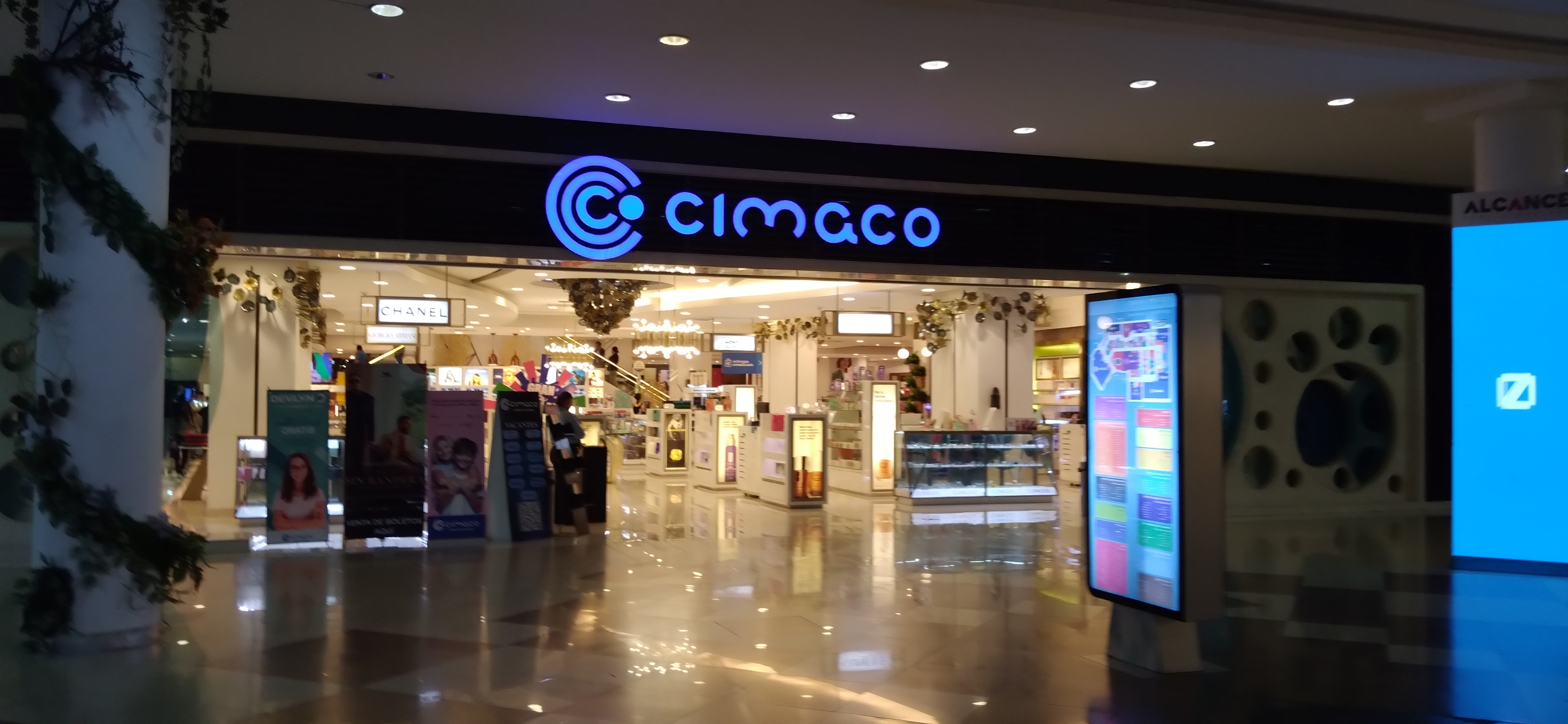
Cimaco in Gran Plaza mall, Mazatlán

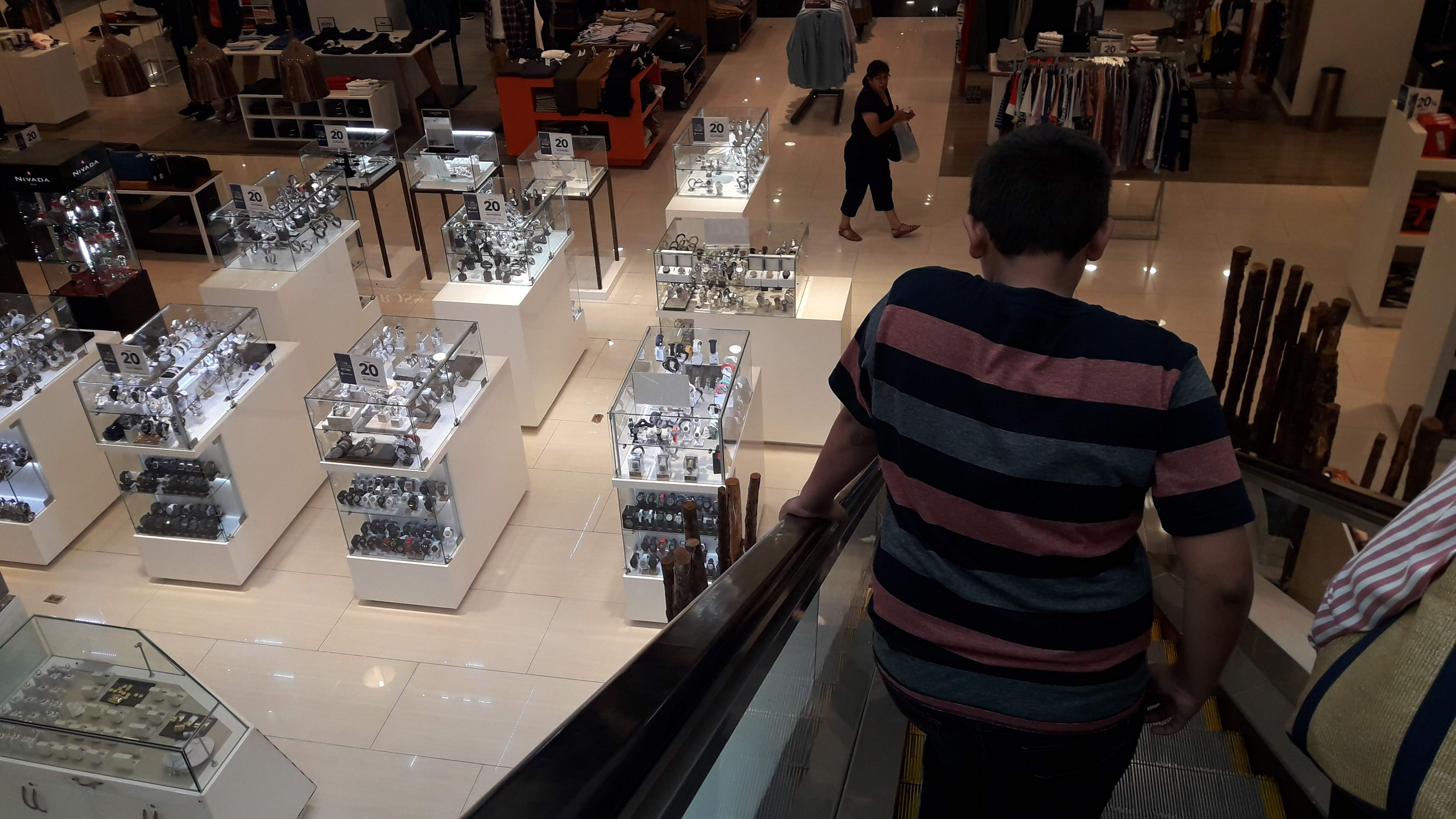
Inside Cimaco Mazatlán

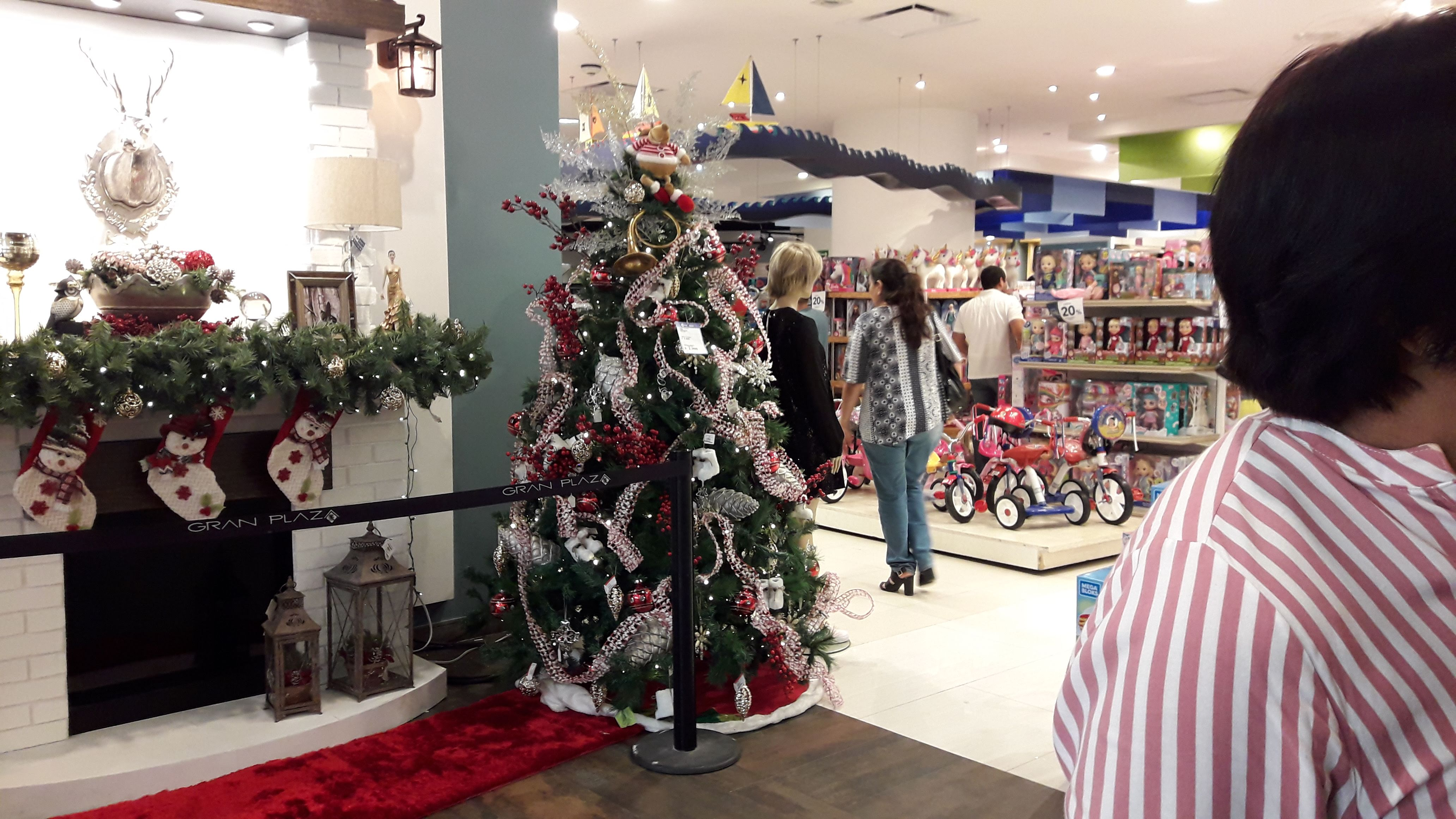
Christmas display at Cimaco Mazatlán

Cimaco is a regional department store chain in northern Mexico, founded in 1930 and based in the city of Torreón, in the state of Coahuila, with stores in Chihuahua and Sinaloa states as well.

== History ==
Cimaco's heritage dates back to the Laguna Radio Company (sic), founded on September 1, 1930, by Carlos Issa Marcos and his nephew Elías Murra Marcos. The shop was located on the corner of Juárez and Rodríguez streets in the center of Torreón. Taking advantage of the rise of radio, the store offers the latest in radio devices; over time it expands its range of products to include white goods (domestic appliances), spare parts, tires, et al.

In 1938 the Laguna Radio Company was restructured under the new name Compañía Comercial Cimaco S.A.

In 1948 Cimaco opened its new store at the corner of Avenida Hidalgo and C. Ramón Corona streets, still in operation today. Cimaco Hidalgo had the floor area, functionality and comfort that Cimaco urgently needed. It launched with 2,475 square meters of floor space but has since been expanded to cover the entire block. It has been remodeled and redecorated several times; escalators were added, two parking areas and other services.

In 1980 Cimaco celebrated its 50th anniversary and announced the construction of a new 18,000-square-meter warehouse and distribution center which opened October 1981. Services include receiving, marking, storage and logistics for delivery of merchandise to Grupo Cimaco stores.

== Stores ==
Table of Cimaco store locations
| Year opened | Name | Location | City | Area sq. m. | Levels |
|---|---|---|---|---|---|
| 1938 | Cimaco Hidalgo | Hidalgo and Corona, Downtown | Torreón, Coahuila | 13,000 (sales area of 10,000 sqm) | |
| November 20, 1986 | Cimaco Juárez, Chihuahua | at Plaza Mall | Ciudad Juárez | 4,000 | |
| November 28, 2001 | Cimaco Plaza Cuatro Caminos | Plaza Cuatro Caminos | Torreón, Coahuila | 21,000 | 3 |
| 2007 | Cimaco Saltillo | Plaza Comercial Patio | Saltillo, Coahuila | 8,500 | 2 |
| 2013 | Cimaco Mazatlan | Gran Plaza | Mazatlán, Sinaloa | 13,000 (sales area 10,000) | |
| November 22, 2018 | Cimaco Monclova | Paseo Monclova | Monclova, Coahuila | 9,500 (sales area) | 2 |
| October 21, 2021 | Cimaco Culiacán | Blvd. Pedro Infante, State Congress the new branch belonging to | Culiacán, Sinaloa | | |

== E-commerce ==
On September 24, 2001, the company launched Cimaco Online, a website offering the store's merchandise for online sale and information about promotions, customer charge account statements, online payments, et al.

== Management ==
Eduardo Murra Marcos is the chairman of the board as of 2023. As of 2023, the company has about 2,200 employees.

== Events and community ==
Cimaco organizes regular fashion shows, high-society social events in Torreón.

For Día de Muertos, Cimaco creates an altar, for example in 2023 one dedicated to Colombian sculptor and artist Fernando Botero.

The Cuatro Caminos store has an auditorium which is a venue for various high-profile lectures in Torreón.
