= Tía =

South American supermarket chain

Tía S.A.
- Type: Private company
- Industry: Retail
- Founded: 1940; 86 years ago, Bogotá, Colombia
- Founder: Federico Deutsch, Karel Steuer
- Headquarters: Ecuador, Uruguay
- Area served: Ecuador, Uruguay
- Divisions: Tía S.A. (Ecuador); MAGDA Supermercados S.A (Ecuador); Ta-Ta S.A. (Uruguay); Multi Ahorro S.A. (Uruguay)
- Website: www.tia.com.ec - Tia Ecuador

Tiendas Industriales Asociadas S.A., branded as Tía and sometimes known as Almacenes Tía, is a South American retailing brand founded in 1940. Its divisions in Ecuador and Uruguay trade under the brands Tía, MAGDA, Ta-Ta and MULTI AHORRO, where they are together the largest discount retailer, with over 450 locations. Tía S.A. (Colombia) operated 19 locations under the Tía brand, until it closed in 2017 because of poor sales.

== History ==
Tía was formed by the Eastern European supermarket chain Te-Ta founded by Kerel Steuer and Federico Deutsch in the 1920s in Prague. They traded in Czechoslovakia, Yugoslavia and Romania, but in 1940, after the start of World War II, they emigrated to the Americas, leaving everything behind. They restarted that year in Bogotá, Colombia as Tía, and later expanded into Argentina, Peru, Uruguay and Ecuador using Tía and other brand names.

Steuer and Deutsch had stores where customers could find everything, with no need to shop elsewhere. The first Tía store in South America on October 14, 1940, on Carrera Séptima in Bogotá.

The South American store industry has been a support for the development of this business organization, which besides the supermarket segment, allowed small manufacturing operations to arise over time and become important manufacturing companies in Colombia, Argentina, Ecuador, and Uruguay. Tía was one of the first stores to enter the market of private labels. This store was a pioneer in many aspects, which have served as a basis for national and international chains to modernize their business model.

Currently, Tía is present in Ecuador and Uruguay. The Argentine division with its 61 stores was sold to French supermarket chain Carrefour in 1999 for US$630 million and was rebranded first as Norte, then as Carrefour. The Peruvian division was sold after failing in the Peruvian market. The Colombian division closed in 2017 after 77 years.

Tía is majority-owned by Francisco de Narváez and family, Gustavo Andrés Deutsch, and financial institutions.

== Formats ==
Tía trades as:

- Tía: Supermarkets are located in cities with populations over 25,000.
- Super Tía: Hypermarkets are located in cities with populations over 125,000.
- Plaza Tía: Shopping malls with a Tía supermarket and a variety of complementary stores.
- Tía Express: A small supermarket format.
- MULTI AHORRO: Neighborhood supermarkets in Barrios, bought in 2012 by Tía's Uruguayan branch Ta-Ta.
- MAGDA Supermercados: An Ecuadorian supermarket chain bought in 2012.
- Ta-Ta: The brand name for Tía in Uruguay.
- Tarjeta Más: A credit card operation on Ecuador.

=== Websites ===
- Ecuador Official website
- Uruguay Official website

== Locations ==
=== Current ===
==== Ecuador ====
The first store in Ecuador opened in the downtown of Guayaquil on November 29, 1960. In 2017, Tía was the biggest retailer, and eleventh in the ranking of the best companies in Ecuador.

=== Uruguay ===
On June 13, 1956, Tía's subsidiary Ta-Ta opened the first department store in Uruguay at the corner of 18 de Julio Avenue and Carlos Roxlo, kicking off modernization of the retail and supermarket industry in Uruguay.

In 2012 Ta-Ta bought the Uruguayan supermarket and electronic department store chain Multi Ahorro.

Ta-Ta employs more than 6000 employees, and has hypermarkets located in all 19 of the country's departments. As of March 2012, Ta-Ta was the biggest retailer in Uruguay with over 30% market share.

=== Former ===
==== Argentina ====
The first store opened Buenos Aires in 1946. An innovative business concept was to put round island shelves in each department. In 1999, Exxel, a buyout fund backed by American investors, and Promodes, France's then second-largest retail chain, bought Tía's Argentine division and its 61 stores for $630 million. Carrefour (after acquiring Promodes) spent another $600 million over three years to add stores.

Two of the founders' descendants, brothers Carlos and Francisco de Narváez, wanted to reopen Tía in Argentina. In 2009 they bought back the Argentine brand from Carrefour and promised to re-establish the supermarket chain's Argentine division, starting in Buenos Aires.

==== Colombia ====
The first store opened in Bogotá on October 14, 1940, on Carrera Séptima. Their business model was new to Colombia.

Tía had supermarkets in Bogotá, Medellín, Bucaramanga, Barranquilla, Cúcuta, Sogamoso, Ibagué, Facatativá, Palmira, and Tunja.

Tía Colombia decided to close its doors on November 23, 2017 after 77 years of trading, because of its continual losses.

==== Peru ====
The first store in Peru opened in Lima in 1958, in Miraflores District's Schell street. It later expanded to more than three other districts. Due to the economic crisis and internal conflict of the country, it closed in the 1980s.
