= París (retail store) =

Chilean chain of department stores

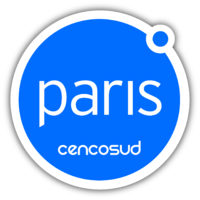

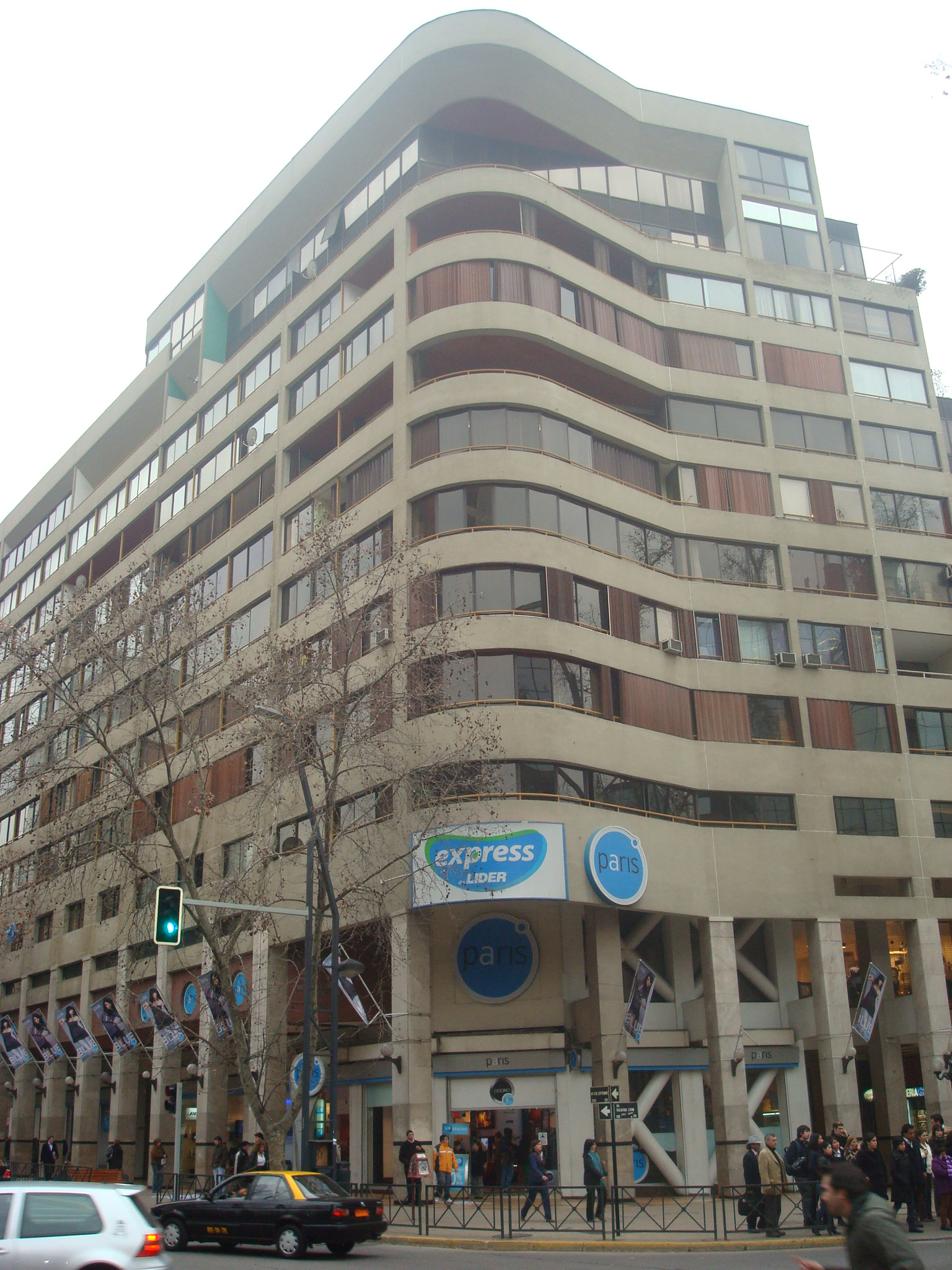
- A location in Providencia, Chile that also features a Líder Express
- Type: Department store
- Predecessor: Almacenes París; Paris S.A.
- Founded: 1900; 126 years ago in Santiago, Chile
- Founder: José María Couso
- Headquarters: Santiago, Chile
- Parent: Cencosud
- Website: Official website

París, formerly known as Almacenes París (Paris Department Stores), is a chain of department stores in Chile, owned by multinational Cencosud. It was a member of the International Association of Department Stores from 2000 to 2005.

== Products ==
The company operates dozens of stores across the country. París sells apparel for men, women, and children, household appliances, and furniture, and even has its own travel agency. The company is owned by conglomerate Cencosud.

Owns: Alaniz, Alaniz Home, Aussie, Attimo, Opposite, Tribu, Tri, Nex, Greenfield, Rainforest, among others.

Exclusives: Umbrale, Foster, Brooks Brothers, Lacoste Shoes, Nautica, Cheeky, Topshop, Paula Cahen D'Anvers, Legacy, Topper, Tommy Hilfiger shoes and more.

Brand Corners: Ellus, Lacoste, Maui and Sons, Esprit, edc by Esprit, Calvin Klein Underwear, and more.

== History ==
The company was started in 1900 as Paris S.A. The company motto is es mi tienda - "It's my store".

París (called Empresas Almacenes París S.A. or Almacenes París C.S.A.) is a chain of department stores founded in Santiago, Chile. His headquarters was located in Avenida Libertador General Bernardo O'Higgins 815, in the commune of Santiago. However, at present, share facilities with its parent Cencosud, is a building located at the side of the shopping mall Alto Las Condes, in Kennedy Avenue 9001, Floor 4, Las Condes, Santiago.

The department store was founded in 1900 by José María Couso as Mueblería París. In 1950 the department store changed its name to Almacenes París, following the expansion of its field sales.

In 1970, Almacenes París created the first department store credit card, the "Tarjeta París", a concept that was rapidly adopted by its main competitors, Ripley and S.A.C.I. Falabella. In 1990, as a result of the bankruptcy of the department store Muricy, Almacenes París acquired locales in Parque Arauco and Mall Plaza Vespucio in addition to their locale in Plaza Lyon in Providencia. It additionally acquired the buildings located in Coyancura with las Bellotas, to which the company headquarters was moved. The former Alameda headquarters building was baptized Torre París. In 1999, Paris took over American department store chain JCPenney, which entered Chile in 1994 with a store at Mall Alto Las Condes.

On June 30, 2020, Cencosud announced the end of operations in Paris in Peru, closing all its stores and moving workers to the Wong and Metro supermarkets. While in Chile, the Paris Express format is created, which absorbs Johnson stores.

In March 2025, Cencosud announced the return of operations in Paris in Peru open all its stores.
