= Whiteaway Laidlaw =

Defunct department store chain (1882-1960s)

Whiteaway, Laidlaw & Company, Limited.
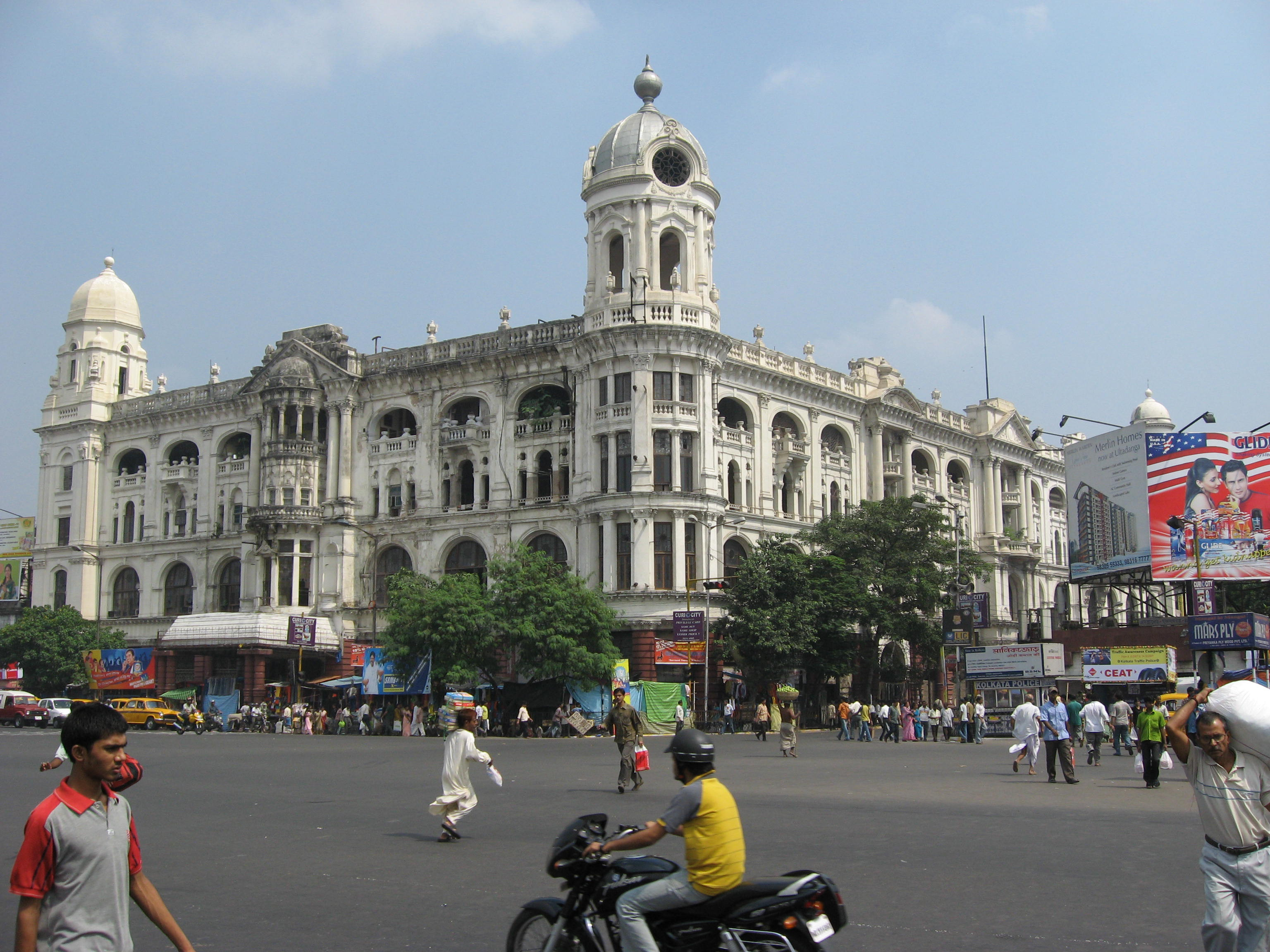
- The Whiteaways and Laidlaw building, Kolkata opened in 1905 (today the Metropolitan Building)
- Trade name: Whiteaway Laidlaw
- Founded: 1882
- Founder: Edward Whiteaway and Robert Laidlaw
- Defunct: 1960s
- Area served: India, Burma, Ceylon, Singapore, Malaysia, China, Siam, Indonesia, Argentina, Kenya
- Products: Household goods

Whiteaway Laidlaw was a British department store chain which operated mainly in Asia, including India, Ceylon, Burma, Singapore, Malaysia and China. It was founded in 1882 and continued to operate until the 1960s.

== History ==
Whiteaway Laidlaw was established by Robert Laidlaw, a British politician who went to India in 1877, and lived there for many years, and Edward Whiteaway, under the name of Whiteaway, Laidlaw & Co, and commenced business in Calcutta in 1882. Described as drapers, outfitters and sellers of general household goods, they opened some of the earliest department stores in Asia, and operated on the basis of cash trading only, earning the nickname "Right-away, Paid-for".

The business soon expanded in India and then across the East, and by 1908 it had 23 branches operating in India, Burma, China, Ceylon, the Straits Settlements, and the Federated Malay States. In 1899, the partnership was dissolved when Whiteaway left the business but continued to grow under Laidlaw. Known as the "Selfridges of the East" because of its reputation as an upmarket shopping destination, it continued to cater to mainly Europeans and wealthy westernized locals. Around this time, the company had also expanded their business to the Dutch East Indies, opening their only store at Surabaya. It was known to be the largest department store in the country during its time. In World War II, the store's management was taken over by the invading Japanese and was renamed into "Chiyoda Store".

In 1908, Whiteaway, Laidlaw & Company Limited was formed, acquired the business of Whiteaway, Laidlaw & Co, and then went public, filing a prospectus in London inviting applications for 300,000 shares of £1 each. Laidlaw continued as chairman of the company until his death in 1915.

By the 1930s, it had expanded further by opening offices in Argentina and Kenya. After independence in India in 1947 many British colonial officials and military personnel left the business. Great Universal Stores bought the store chain in 1957. Branches across the country gradually began to close with the branch in Kolkata closing in 1962. On the Malay peninsula the last branch closed in Singapore in 1962, and in Penang in 1965.
