= Horst Paulmann =

German-Chilean billionaire businessman (1935–2025)

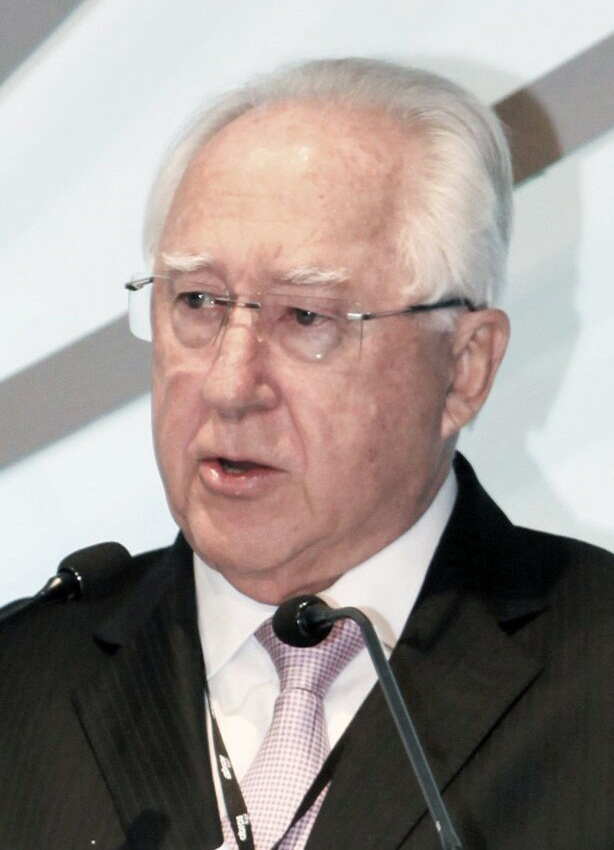
- Paulmann in 2014
- Born: 22 March 1935; Kassel, Gau Electoral Hesse, Germany
- Died: 11 March 2025 (aged 89); Germany
- Occupations: CEO and chairman, Cencosud
- Known for: Retail tycoon
- Children: 4
- Relatives: Jürgen Paulmann

Horst Paulmann Kemna (22 March 1935 – 11 March 2025) was a German-Chilean billionaire businessman. He was the founder and chairman of Cencosud, the largest retail chain in Chile and the third largest in Latin America.

According to Forbes, as of July 2022, his net worth was estimated at US$2.3 billion.

== Background ==
Paulmann was the son of the SS-Obersturmbannführer Werner Paulmann and Hilde Kemna. To escape the Nuremberg trials, in 1946 Horst Paulmann and his family, consisting of his parents and seven siblings, emigrated from Germany after the end of World War II. They crossed the Alps towards Italy, continued on to Argentina in 1948, and finally to Chile in 1950.

At the age of 13, Paulmann worked as a telephone operator in Buenos Aires and later worked making wooden toys. His family settled in the city of Temuco in the south of Chile, and his father got a position as a franchisee at Club Alemán and at Club de La Unión. In 1952, Paulmann's family bought a local restaurant called Las Brisas and they soon transformed it into a supermarket. Since then and after the death of his father, Horst and his brother Jürgen Paulmann built a series of supermarket chains, beginning with the first hypermarket, located on Av. Kennedy. It measured 4,000 square meters and would become the foundation of the holding company Cencosud.

Paulmann had three children with Helga Koepfer: Manfred, Peter, and Heike. In 2018, he welcomed a son, Hans Dieter Paulmann Bischof, with his partner Katherine Bischof Sepúlveda. Paulmann died in Germany on 11 March 2025, at the age of 89.

== Career ==
Cencosud was founded by Horst Paulmann on 10 November 1978 when he assumed the role of CEO and chairman. Cencosud employs more than 150,000 people in Chile, Argentina, Colombia, Brazil and Peru, where it operates its supermarket chains (such as Jumbo, Santa Isabel, Disco, Vea, Gbarbosa, Prezunic, Bretas, Perini, Wong and Metro); department stores (such as París and Johnson's); home improvement stores (such as Easy and Blaisten); commercial centers and credit stores (with over 4.3 million credit cards issued).

One of his projects is the complex Costanera Center, which includes the tallest tower in South America, measuring 300 meters, a six-story mall, a hotel, and office towers.

In 2004, Cencosud began trading its shares on the Santiago Stock Exchange, and on the NYSE starting in 2011. The Paulmann family is the main shareholder of Cencosud. Manfred, Peter and Heike Paulmann Koepfer have represented Cencosud in its directory and are part of the agreement of the board of directors, which was formed for the succession of the president in the conduct of the company.

== Criticism ==
Although his father's past was revealed by the online newspaper El Mostrador in 2012, Horst Paulmann never commented on the matter. However, in a commemorative publication commemorating the award of honorary Chilean citizenship in the Chilean Congress in 2006, it was stated that Werner Paulmann was a simple Wehrmacht member and lawyer who fled to Argentina via Italy with the help of the Red Cross, as he would otherwise have been taken prisoner of war.

Paulmann Kemna has been criticized for alleged connections to the German cult settlement and torture site Colonia Dignidad. Goods manufactured in Colonia Dignidad were sold in Cencosud stores and advertised through videos filmed there.

He was also said to have been an admirer of the Chilean dictator Augusto Pinochet. An event planned for February 2012 by the Kassel Lions Club, at which Paulmann Kemna was to give a guest speech, was canceled at short notice due to numerous protests against Paulmann Kemna.

Cencosud has paid its employees only the minimum wage for decades and is known for spying on its employees and rigorously cracking down on misconduct by its workforce, such as petty theft or the use of company property, and for approving arrests in the process. Mass layoffs due to economic downturns are also common.

== Other activities ==
Paulmann was the president of the Argentina–Chile Permanent Binational Business Board and a member of Argentine Business Association. He was also director of the Chilean–German Chamber of Commerce and the Chilean Chamber of Commerce.

== Awards ==
- Entrepreneur of the Year Diario Financiero (2012)
- World Entrepreneur of The Year 2012, by Ernst & Young (2012)
- Konex Awards, Service and Commerce Entrepreneur (2008)
- Member of The Year, Chilean–German Chamber of Commerce and Industry (2007)
- University Extension Award, Universidad Mayor (2006)
- People and Development of Distinction Award granted during the Percade Congress (2006)
- Chilean citizenship by grace (2005)
- ICARE Award, Entrepreneur of the Year (2005)
- ASA Salvador D’Anna Award for best retail entrepreneur of the year - Argentina (2005)
- Decoration from Orden de Mayo for his degree of Commander - Argentina (2004)
- Diego Portales Award for outstanding entrepreneur (2004)

== See also ==
- List of oldest fathers
