= Crudo (disambiguation) =

Crudo or variation, may refer to:

== Food ==
- Crudo, Italian raw fish
- Cruda, Italian tartare
- Crudos, Chilean tartare
- Prosciutto crudo a.k.a. crudo, Italian ham
- Crudités (same root word as Italian crudo), raw vegetables

== People ==
- Javier Gallego (born 1975) nicknamed "Crudo"; Spanish journalist

=== Surnamed ===
- Frank Crudo, Canadian politician
- Richard Crudo, U.S. filmmaker
- Tony Crudo (born 1959) U.S. soccer player

== Music ==
- Crudo (band), U.S. band
- Los Crudos (band) U.S. punk band

== Other ==
- Crudo (novel), 2018 novel by Olivia Laing

== See also ==
- Cotto (disambiguation)
- Tartare
