= Kotto =

Kotto may refer to:

== People ==
- Maka Kotto (born 1961), Canadian politician and actor
- Yaphet Kotto (1939–2021), American actor

== Places ==
- Basse-Kotto (Lower Kotto), a prefecture of the Central African Republic
- Haute-Kotto (Upper Kotto), a prefecture of the Central African Republic

== Other uses ==
- Kotto River, a tributary of the Oubangui River in the Central African Republic

== See also ==
- Koto (disambiguation)
- Cotto (disambiguation)
- Coto (disambiguation)
