= Disco (supermarket chain) =

Argentine supermarket chain

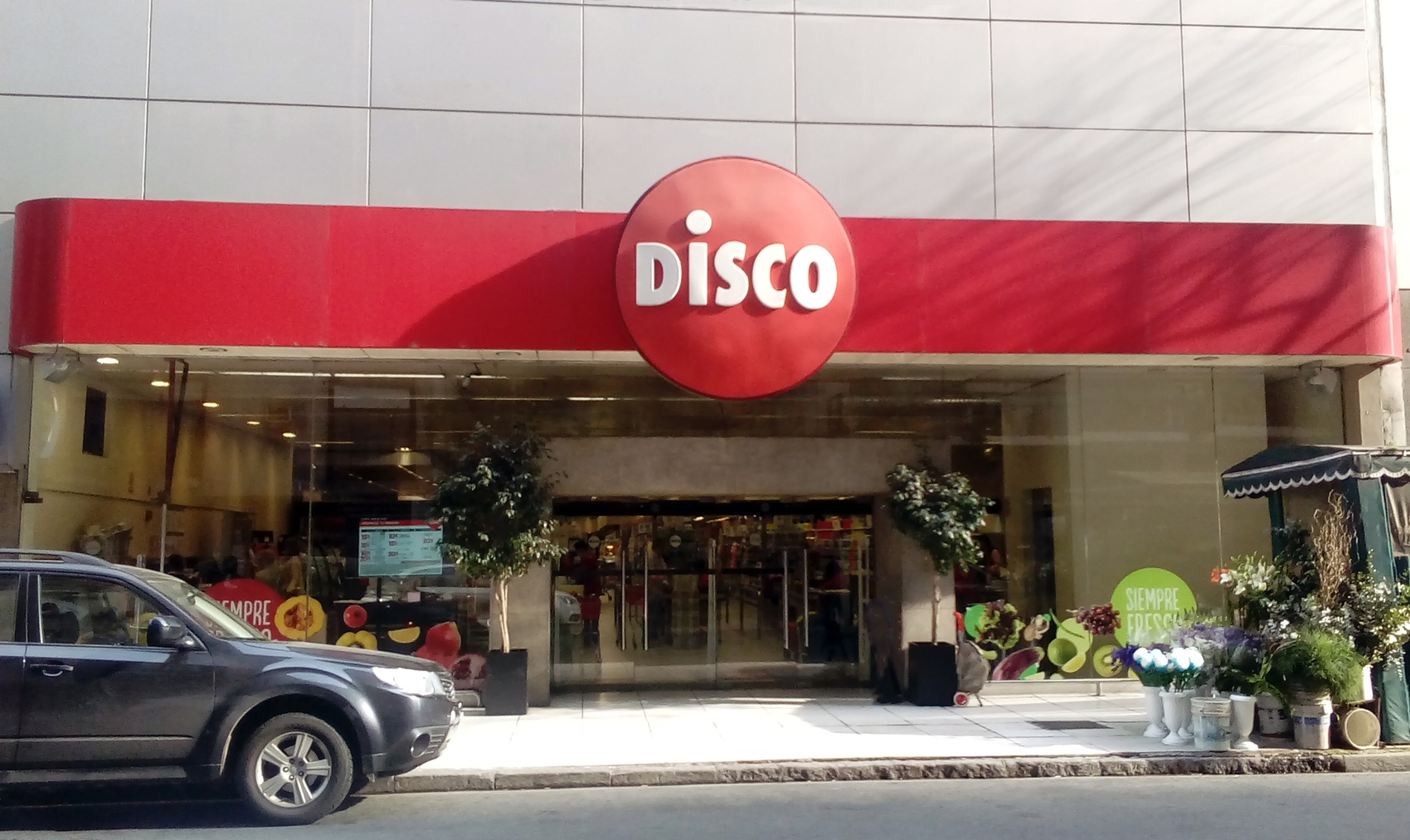
- Facade of a Disco supermarket in Buenos Aires, February 2019
- Type: Private (1961–67)
- Industry: Retail
- Founded: 1961; 65 years ago
- Fate: Acquired by Cencosud in 2004
- Headquarters: Argentina
- Products: Supermarket
- Brands: Vea
- Owner: Velox (1967–1998); Royal Ahold (1998–2004); Cencosud (2004–pres.)
- Website: disco.com.ar

Disco is an Argentine supermarket chain. It is one of many supermarket chains part of the Chilean retail conglomerate Cencosud, after it was acquired from the Dutch retailer Ahold in 2004. In Argentina, Cencosud also owns the upscale hypermarket chain Jumbo and the budget oriented supermarket chain Vea.

As of September 2021, Disco had 76 stores distributed in Buenos Aires, Córdoba and Santa Fe provinces.

== History ==
Supermercados Disco opened its first store in 1961 on Centenario Avenue in San Isidro, Buenos Aires. In 1967, a Uruguayan family bought 50% of the Argentine brand's stock, increasing their interest to 100% in 1981. The Uruguayans retained ownership of Disco until 1984.

During the 1960s, Disco's first decade as a supermarket chain, it competed directly with other well known Argentine supermarkets such as Norte, Gigante, and Tía, all of which were large, national supermarket chains, and with smaller, family-owned supermarket operations across the country.

In 1997, Disco bought the supermarket chain Vea for US$210 million, getting complete ownership of the company. This purchase turned Disco into the second biggest food retailer in the country at the time, behind Carrefour. At that time, most of Disco's shares belonged to the Uruguayan Velox Holdings group. Velox also owned the Chilean chain Santa Isabel, that would later become part of Cencosud as well.

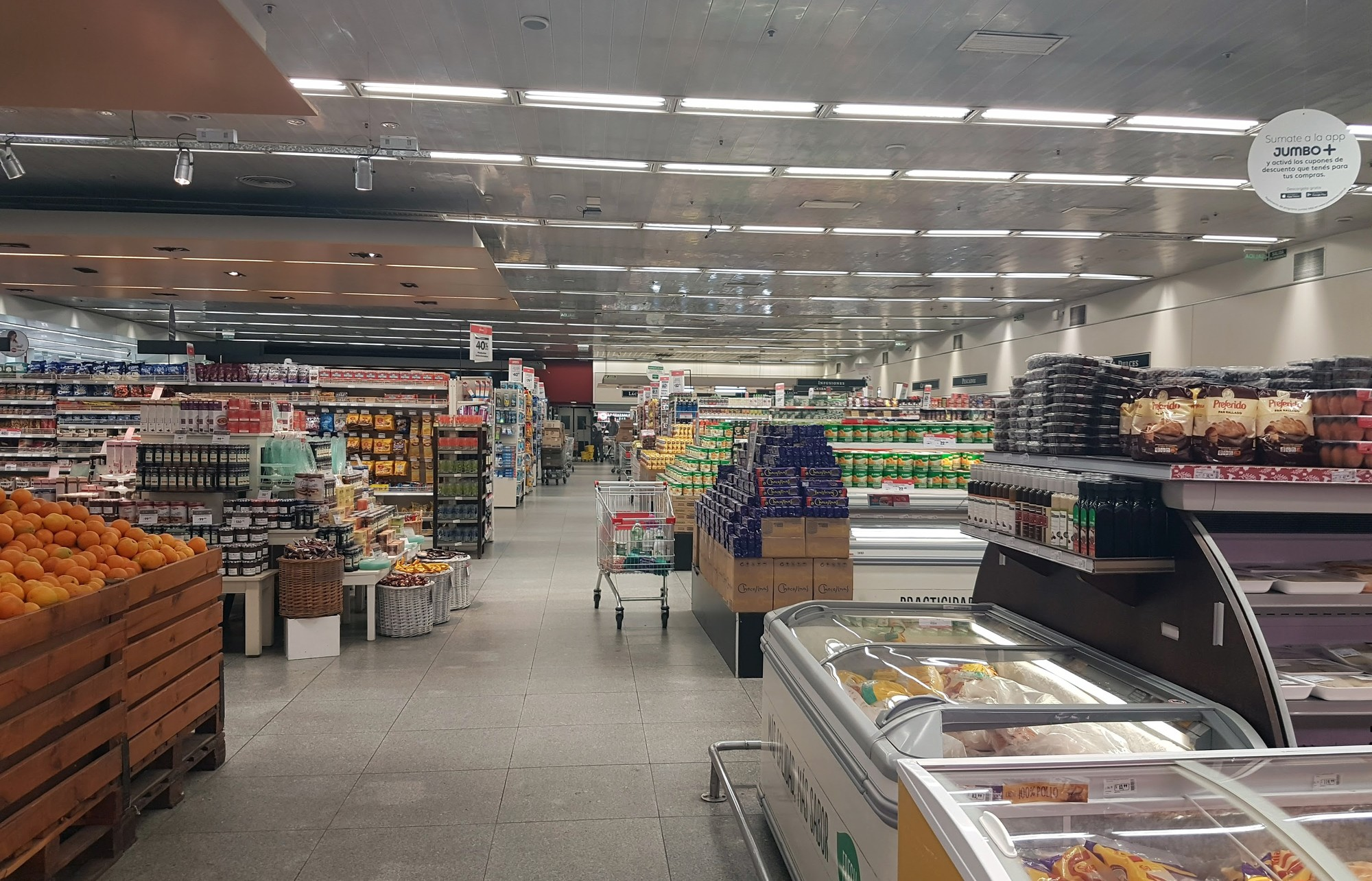
Interior of a Disco store in Buenos Aires

In early 1998, Dutch food retailer Royal Ahold purchased a 25% stake in Disco as well as a 18.5% stake in Santa Isabel from Velox, creating a new partnership named Disco-Ahold International. The buyout of Disco was valued at US$368 million. Later that year, Ahold would get an increasingly bigger share of Disco until it bought the remaining 48% in an operation valued at US$160 million, after which the company was delisted from the NYSE to be made private.

Ahold's 2003 accounting scandal ended with the resignation of the entire directorate of Disco, and rumors of a possible sale of the Argentine subsidiary started to become public.

Finally, in 2004, Disco was acquired by Chilean retail giant Cencosud for US$315 million, solidifying its stronghold in the Argentine retail market together with hypermarket chain Jumbo and home improvement chain Easy.

In 2007, Cencosud started to convert some Disco branches to the budget-oriented Súper Vea banner in order to better be able to compete in lower income demographics. At the time, 120 locations were operating under the Disco name.

As of 2018, the company operates 76 locations, mostly in Buenos Aires, Cordoba and Santa Fe provinces.
