= Cottoy =

Cottoy is a surname. Notable people with the surname include:

- Jevon Cottoy (born 1996), Canadian football player
- Keron Cottoy (born 1989), Vincentian cricketer

== See also ==
- Cotto (name)
- Cotton (surname)
