= Coto =

Coto may refer to:

== People ==
- Coto (surname)

== Places ==
- Coto 47, a town in Costa Rica near the border with Panama, and the site of the 1921 Coto War
- Coto, Isabela, Puerto Rico, a barrio
- Coto, Peñuelas, Puerto Rico, a barrio
- Coto (Narcea), a parish in Cangas del Narcea, Asturias, Spain
- El Coto, a parish in Somiedo, Asturias, Spain

== Languages ==
- Orejón language (also known as Coto language)
- Coixoma language (also known as Coto language)

== Other uses ==
- Coto makassar, an Indonesian soup
- Coto Supermarkets, a supermarket chain in Argentina

== See also ==
- Coto Coto Train, a touristic train service in Japan
- Cotto (disambiguation)
- Koto (disambiguation)
