= Coto (surname) =

Coto is a surname. Notable people with the name include:

- Alberto Coto García (born 1970), Spanish mental calculator
- Alfredo Coto (born 1941), Argentine businessman
- Ana Coto (born 1990), Puerto Rican-born American actress
- Carles Coto (born 1988), Spanish footballer
- Carolina Coto Segnini, Costa Rican model and actress
- Fernando Coto Albán (1919–1989), Costa Rican jurist
- Joe Coto (born 1939), American politician from California
- Manny Coto (born 1961), Cuban-American film writer, director and producer
- Víctor Coto Ortega (born 1990), Italian-Costa Rican footballer
- Wilfredo Coto (1917–1993), Cuban sports shooter
