= Obsessed (2009 film) =

2009 American psychological thriller film

- Theatrical release poster
- Directed by: Steve Shill
- Written by: David Loughery
- Produced by: Will Packer
- Starring: Idris Elba; Beyoncé Knowles; Ali Larter; Bruce McGill; Jerry O'Connell; Christine Lahti
- Cinematography: Ken Seng
- Edited by: Paul Seydor
- Music by: James Dooley
- Production companies: Screen Gems; Rainforest Films; Parkwood Entertainment
- Distributed by: Sony Pictures Releasing
- Release dates: April 23, 2009 (School of Visual Arts); April 24, 2009 (United States)
- Running time: 108 minutes
- Country: United States
- Language: English
- Budget: $20 million
- Box office: $73.8 million

Obsessed is a 2009 American psychological thriller film directed by Steve Shill and written by David Loughery. It stars Idris Elba, Beyoncé and Ali Larter alongside Bruce McGill, Jerry O'Connell and Christine Lahti. The film follows Lisa Sheridan (Larter), an office temp who develops unrequited feelings for her boss, Derek Charles (Elba), and repeatedly attempts to seduce him. Derek's wife, Sharon (Beyoncé), learns of Lisa's escalating behavior and suspects her husband is having an affair.

Obsessed premiered at the School of Visual Arts on April 23, 2009, and was theatrically released by Sony Pictures Releasing under its Screen Gems label in the United States the following day. The film was panned by critics, who criticized the absence of an explanation for Lisa's obsession with Derek, failure to explore the potential theme of interracial conflict between Lisa and the Charles family, and the fact that Derek did not yield to Lisa's seduction. It also drew unfavorable comparisons to Fatal Attraction (1987), although the climactic fight scene between Beyoncé and Larter was widely praised, winning the MTV Movie Award for Best Fight at the 2010 MTV Movie Awards. Despite the critical reception, the film was a modest success at the box office, grossing $73.8 million against its $20 million budget.

== Plot ==
Derek Charles works for a finance company and lives with his wife Sharon and their two-year-old son Kyle. While he is at work, he is friendly to a temp, Lisa Sheridan. Believing Derek was flirting with her, she tries to seduce him.

Although Derek repeatedly rejects her, Lisa continues to pursue him, and makes sexual advances toward him at the office Christmas party. Later, she follows him to his car and flashes him until he forces her out of his car. Derek intends to report Lisa to human resources, but learns that she has quit her job.

Thinking that Lisa has given up, Derek is nervous when he receives flirtatious emails from her. He and his workmates visit a resort for a conference, where she shows up. When he confronts her, she spikes his drink. Incapacitated, she then follows him into his hotel room.

Derek confronts Lisa again the following day, and hours later discovers her lying nude in his bed after attempting suicide, and calls for an ambulance. After repeated attempts to reach him on his phone, Sharon finds him at the hospital and suspects that he and Lisa had an affair, as Lisa claims.

Detective Monica Reese questions Derek's fidelity to Sharon, but soon becomes skeptical of Lisa's claims due to inconsistencies in her story. Refusing to believe Derek, Sharon kicks him out of their house.

Three months later, Derek and Sharon reconcile over a birthday dinner. While they are out, Lisa tricks the babysitter Samantha into letting her into the house. When Derek and Sharon return home, they discover that Lisa has taken Kyle. Derek intends to pursue her, only to find Kyle sitting in the back seat of his car.

He and Sharon immediately take Kyle to the hospital for a check-up. When they return home, they find Lisa has trashed their bedroom and removed Sharon's face from their family portrait. Sharon leaves a threatening voice message on Lisa's phone, and she and Derek set up a home alarm system.

Lisa learns that Derek and Sharon will be going out of town for a few days, with her leaving in the afternoon and him the next day. While Sharon is on her way to pick up Kyle, she realizes she forgot to set the alarm system and returns home.

Lisa breaks into the Charles' house. While setting the alarm, Sharon hears Lisa and confronts her. When Derek calls the home phone, Lisa answers, prompting him to alert Detective Reese as he rushes home. Lisa chases Sharon to the attic and Sharon leads Lisa to a weak spot in the attic floor, where she falls through. Lisa plummets onto the glass table below, and is killed when the chandelier drops from the ceiling and crushes her. Detective Reese arrives as Sharon comes out of the house and embraces Derek.

== Cast ==
- Idris Elba as Derek Charles
- Beyoncé Knowles as Sharon Charles
- Ali Larter as Lisa Sheridan
- Jerry O'Connell as Ben
- Christine Lahti as Detective Monica Reese
- Scout Taylor-Compton as Samantha
- Bruce McGill as Joe Gage
- Matthew Humphreys as Patrick
- Richard Ruccolo as Hank
- Nathan and Nicolas Myers as Kyle Charles

== Production ==
=== Background ===
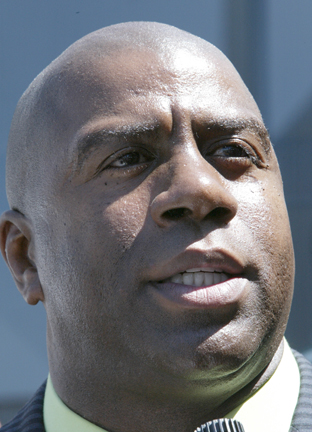
NBA legend Earvin "Magic" Johnson served as an executive producer

The concept of Obsessed was thought up by Clint Culpepper, president of Screen Gems, and was shared with David Loughery, who then wrote the screenplay, taking basic inspiration from the similar stalker thriller Fatal Attraction (1987). Producer William Packer read the script and signed on; executive producers for the film were Glenn S. Gainor, Jeff Graup, Earvin "Magic" Johnson, Beyoncé, Mathew Knowles, Damon Lee and Loughery, while Nicholas Stern and George Flynn served as co-producer and associate producer, respectively. Director Steve Shill signed on after reading the script and hearing that Beyoncé was on board. Part of the reason Elba joined in was that the black–white theme was ignored; "It's not mentioned in the film, it's never an issue, and I think that's phenomenal ... To me, that was very refreshing that the studio execs didn't want to make an issue of it." Obsessed was allocated a production budget of $20 million. Shill stated that the intended effect of the film was to have the audience discuss the characters' motivations. Writer David Loughery designed Lisa as "not a villain in a traditional sense; she's not setting out to wreck a marriage or ruin somebody's life. She really believes that [Derek] is in love with her." Lisa's past was deliberately omitted from the film, explaining, "It's scarier if we never really know how she's developed this personality that can go from very loving to ultimately deadly."

=== Casting and filming ===
The casting directors for Obsessed were Ron Digman and Valorie Massalas. According to Packer, Elba and Zoe Saldaña were the favorite actors for their respective lead roles; he stated that "they both brought the right amount of depth and sex appeal" to the film. He emphasized the need for actors "who were relatable and who can handle that type of human interplay that we have in the film." Packer showed the film script to Beyoncé's talent agent, who suggested that Beyoncé play the role of Sharon. The producers "immediately ... fell in love with that idea; once she suggested Beyoncé, nobody else could play the role." Packer said that Beyoncé became interested in working on Obsessed because the film was not focused on the music industry, and that it was the first time she played a non-singer. Packer also reported that "she was looking for that challenge and welcomed this opportunity". Beyoncé stated that she found it challenging to concentrate purely on "the emotion and the psychology of the relationship". Beyoncé had never taken part in a fight scene, but she was able to learn how to perform the scenes quickly because they were similar to dance choreography, with which she was familiar. Obsessed was filmed over the summer of 2008, and the final fight scene between Sharon and Lisa was shot over one week.

=== Set and costumes ===
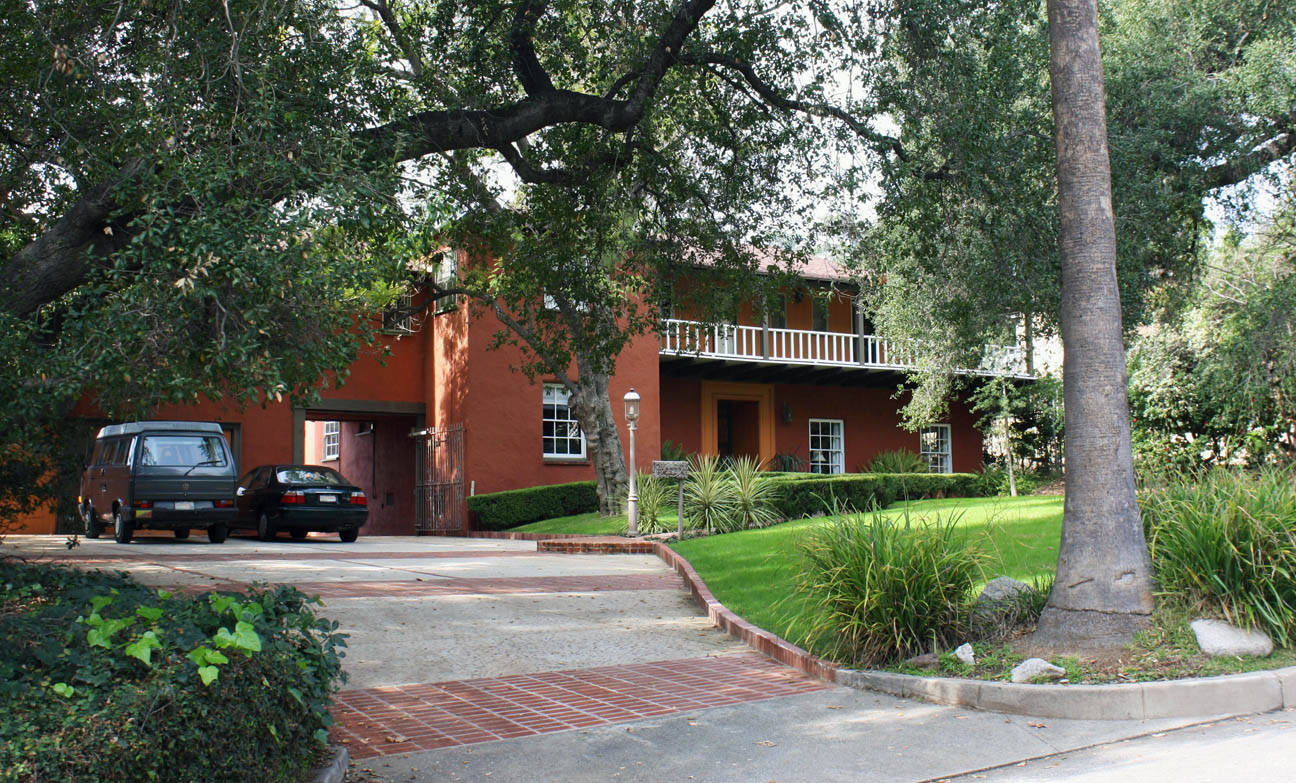
The house used as the Charles' family home

Shill and cinematographer Ken Seng were inspired by Roman Polanski and Alfred Hitchcock when constructing the set, and attempted to make it look both frightening and suburban. Shill stated, "It didn't look like typical Hollywood; it didn't look cosmetic." The Charles' family home was set in a 1923 Altadena, California house, however the action scenes were shot on a separate purpose-built set. The set was customized from a house built for The Stepfather (2009), which in turn was adapted from a block of apartments for Quarantine (2008). The Charles' living room had a ceiling 25 feet (7.6 m) high, and a custom-built chandelier for the climactic ending of the film. According to Gainor, the house is symbolic of the family's aspirations, and is intentionally too large for the three occupants; he said, "It's a little awkward and a little bit eerie." The fight scene was filmed on a sound stage set, rather than in the house, for safety and practicability reasons.

Costume designer Maya Lieberman attempted to contrast the costumes of Sharon and Lisa to reinforce the conflict between the two characters. She said, "With Ali, our discussion started with wanting really clean, classic and sharp lines, whereas Beyoncé's character [wore] more soft, more textural cashmeres and knits." Sharon wore clothes designed by Zac Posen, Yves Saint Laurent, Jimmy Choo, Diane von Fürstenberg, Valentino, Stella McCartney and Missoni, while Lisa wore Gucci, Dolce & Gabbana and Burberry outfits. Derek was dressed in Dolce & Gabbana and Versace suits with Thomas Pink shirts to create a "prestigious yet contemporary" look.

=== Music ===
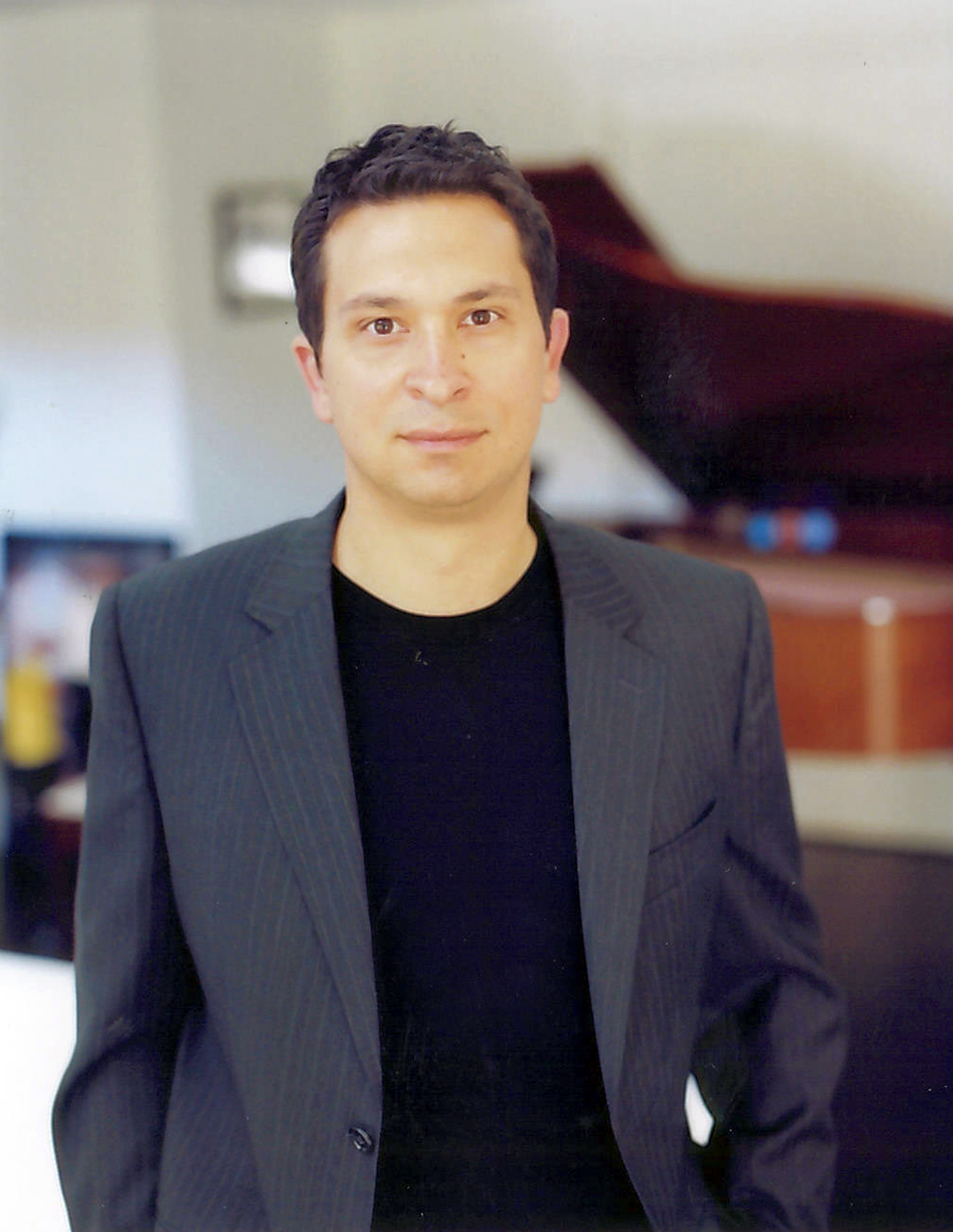
James Dooley wrote the score for Obsessed.

The film score for Obsessed was written by James Dooley. The beginning of Obsessed, where the Charles are seen in their home, plays adult contemporary music in the background. The remainder of the film's first act is supported by light piano instrumentation, and occasional "low-register whoosh-thump noises, of the kind you might hear in a stalker movie", according to Sady Doyle of The Guardian.

Studio recorded songs on the soundtrack of Obsessed are "Any Other Day" (Wyclef Jean and Norah Jones), "Black and Gold" (Sam Sparro), "Soul Food" (Martina Topley-Bird), "American Boy" (Estelle), "Jolly Holly (Deck the Halls)" (Mike Strickland), "I'm Gonna Getcha" (Crudo), "The Christmas Song" (Marcus Miller), "Play That Funky Music" (Wild Cherry), "Have Yourself a Merry Little Christmas" (Ruben Studdard and Tamyra Gray), "Wild Thing" (Tone Lōc), "Oye Al Desierto" (With the Quickness), "Destiny" (Zero 7), "Meet the Brilliant" (Draque Bozung), "Golden" (Jill Scott), "Bambool Wall" (Patch), and "Smash into You" (Beyoncé).

== Release ==
=== Box office ===
Obsessed premiered at the School of Visual Arts, New York City on April 23, 2009, and opened at US cinemas the following day. The film began showing in the United Kingdom on May 29, 2009. It was screened at 2,514 theaters and grossed $11,209,297 on its opening day of April 24, 2009; it ended its opening weekend at the top of the box office, with gross revenue of $28,612,730 in those three days, and became the second-biggest opening weekend for a Screen Gems film ever. The film spent its entire first week of release at number one and grossed $34,802,334, however it slipped to number three the following week due to the release of X-Men Origins: Wolverine and Ghosts of Girlfriends Past.

Obsessed closed in US cinemas on June 14, 2009, having grossed $68,261,644 domestically in its eight weeks of availability, which made up 92.5% of its gross worldwide takings. Outside the US, the film grossed an additional $5,568,696, bringing its total gross box office revenue to $73,830,340. The top performing international territory was Spain, with an opening weekend of $646,760 and a final total of 1,914,828, followed by the United Kingdom with a total of $854,917, Germany with $529,794, and the region of Southern Africa with $343,932.

=== Critical reception ===
On Rotten Tomatoes, the film holds an approval rating of 19% based on 91 reviews, with an average rating of 3.7/10. The site's critics consensus reads: "The inevitable Fatal Attraction comparisons aside, Obsessed is a generic, toothless thriller both instantly predictable and instantly forgettable." Metacritic assigned the film a weighted average score of 25 out of 100, based on 10 critics, indicating "generally unfavorable reviews". Audiences polled by CinemaScore gave the film an average grade of "B+" on an A+ to F scale.

A common complaint about the film was that, unlike most "deranged stalker"-themed films, Obsessed did not explain why Lisa was so determined to seduce Derek, who showed no interest in her at all. Variety's John Anderson and The Hollywood Reporter's Kirk Honeycutt criticized Lisa's lack of motive and backstory. Stella Papamichael of Digital Spy called the film predictable and blamed the well-defined morality of the characters. She wrote, "Unlike the bunny-boiling '80s classic Fatal Attraction, the characters are drawn in 2D. They are either good or bad, and there is absolutely no attempt to understand what drives them either way." Liz Braun from Jam! lambasted the lack of character development in Obsessed and called it "a chemistry-free movie". Jason McKiernan of Filmcritic.com described the film as "so steeped in the formula of the psycho-sexual suspense flick that it works as both a thriller and a comedy" and "very good trash".

Reviewers also noted that the potential for interracial conflict remained unexplored; Entertainment Weekly's Owen Gleiberman wrote, "The movie wants to tease us with intimations of a steamy biracial liaison; it just doesn't want to actually go there." Wesley Morris of The Boston Globe was disappointed that "Obsessed basically plays it safe. The obvious racial buttons are never pushed". Greg Quill from the Toronto Star agreed, and wrote that Shill and Loughery "stripped the drama of its potentially gripping – and obvious – racial overtones". However, Carrie Rickey of The Philadelphia Inquirer pointed out that having the two female roles of differing races "creates racial tension", and noted similarities to "the racially charged" Lakeview Terrace (2008), which Loughery also wrote. Braun was of the impression that a well-written script was replaced by the film's "racial politics". When Derek confronts Lisa at the business conference, she threatens him with a sexual harassment complaint; Sady Doyle from The Guardian wrote that this alludes to "the history of black men being lynched for their perceived threat to white women". Doyle pointed out that historically white women are more revered for their beauty than black women, which is a side theme of the fight between Sharon and Lisa. Melissa Anderson of LA Weekly suggested that awkwardness of the interracial relationship of Derek and Lisa as a reason why the filmmakers did not have the two characters partake in any sexual activity.

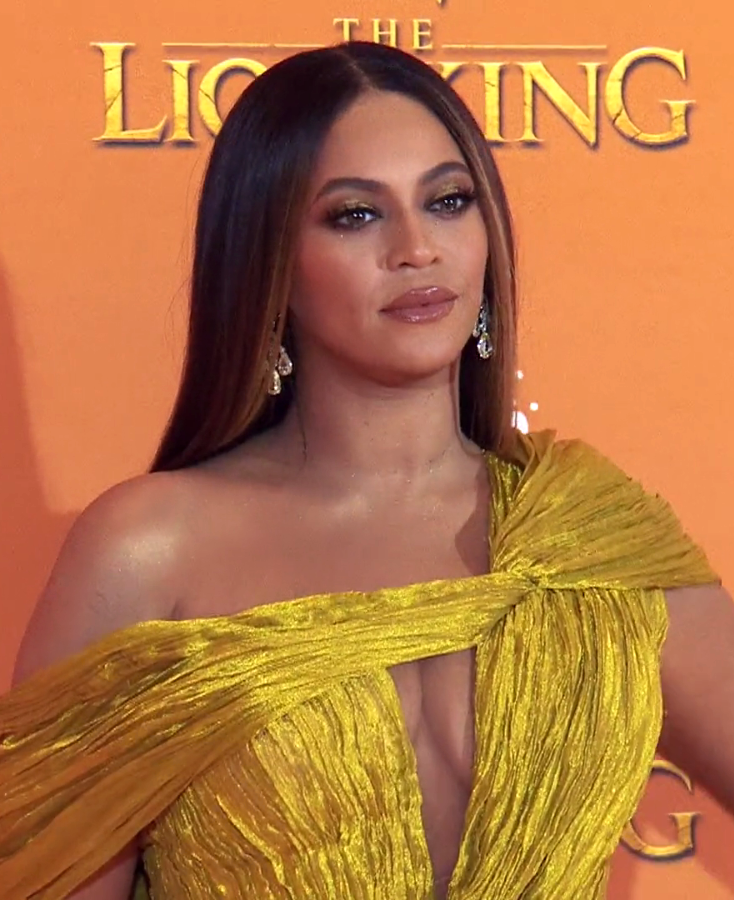
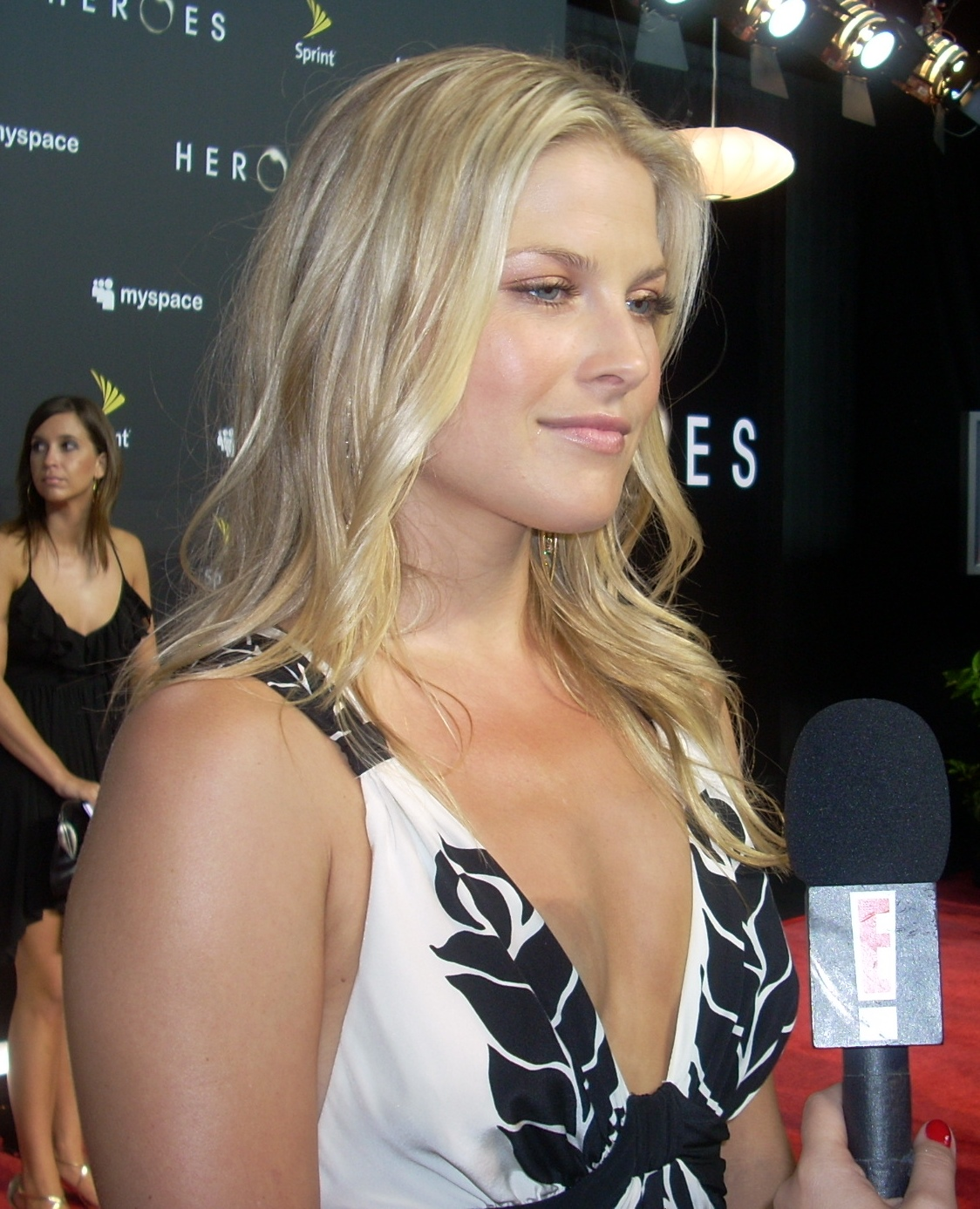
The fight scene between Beyoncé and Ali Larter was praised by critics.

Critics drew close comparisons between Obsessed and Adrian Lyne's 1987 stalker thriller Fatal Attraction. However, two distinctions noted were that Obsessed contains no bunny boiling-like incidents, and that Derek and Lisa did not actually have sexual intercourse. John Anderson of Variety wrote, "If Derek had actually slept with Lisa, a la Michael Douglas in Fatal Attraction, Obsessed would at least have had the spurned-woman gambit to play, however hoary." Peter Travers of Rolling Stone gave the film zero out of four stars, and wrote that Derek's lack of interest in Lisa allowed for no conflict in the film. Travers concluded, "Everything you need to know is in the trailer." The Daily Telegraph's Tim Robey thought that Obsessed would have been more entertaining had Lisa's character been fiercer like Alex Forrest in Fatal Attraction. Rickey opined that while the lack of infidelity made the film less thrilling, it "is about the sanctity of marriage rather than the shame of adultery."

The final fight scene between Sharon and Lisa was lauded by critics. Marjorie Baumgarten from The Austin Chronicle stated that, despite the predictability of its plot, Obsessed caters to "the American moviegoers' appetite for a juicy catfight." E! Online's Natasha Vargas-Cooper lauded the choreography and noted the scene as the highlight of the film. McKiernan called it the "best knock-down, drag-out girlfight" of 2009. However, Alex Navarro from Screened called the fight "boring" because of the filming and editing of the scene.

=== Awards and nominations ===
At the 2009 Teen Choice Awards, Obsessed was nominated in the category of Choice Movie: Drama, while Beyoncé was a nominee for the Choice Movie Actress: Drama award. The fight scene between Sharon and Lisa garnered Beyoncé and Larter a nomination in the Teen Choice Awards' Choice Movie Rumble category, but lost to Twilight. Beyoncé and Larter were nominated in the categories of Worst Actress and Worst Supporting Actress, but lost to Sandra Bullock and Sienna Miller respectively, at the 30th Golden Raspberry Awards ("Razzies"). Elba was nominated for the award for Outstanding Actor in a Motion Picture at the 41st NAACP Image Awards, but lost to Morgan Freeman's portrayal of Nelson Mandela in Invictus (2009). Obsessed won the award for Best Fight at the 2010 MTV Movie Awards, for the fight between Sharon and Lisa. The stunt work was recognized at the 2010 Taurus World Stunt Awards with nominations for Best Fight and Best High Work, and the award for Best Overall Stunt by a Woman.

=== Home media ===
Obsessed was released for home viewing via DVD, Blu-ray and digital distribution by Sony Pictures Home Entertainment on August 4, 2009 in the US. In its first week of release, Obsessed sold 540,925 DVD copies in the US, worth $8,806,259 of sales. As of 2022 the film has sold 1,263,325 DVDs in the US, worth $23,681,293 of consumer expenditure.

== See also ==
- List of films featuring home invasions
