= Alfredo Coto =

Argentine businessman

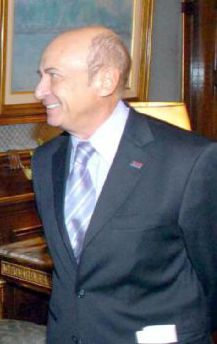
Alfredo Coto

Alfredo Coto (born October 9, 1941) is an Argentine businessman.

== Life ==
Alfredo Coto was born in Buenos Aires in 1941. His father, Joaquín Coto, was an immigrant from Galicia (Spain), and the owner of a small butcher shop in the Retiro section of the city. Working alongside his father from age nine, and joining him in neighborhood deliveries, Coto became a wholesaler in 1963, buying rump roast and other cuts from a Kosher butcher who could not use them. He opened his own, Boedo neighborhood retail butcher in 1969, and managed the shop with his wife, Gloria.

Building on the customer base that the couple had cultivated through wholesale delivery, Coto owned 20 shops by 1976, and began supplying steakhouses. He purchased a cattle ranch in 1978, and in 1981, a slaughterhouse, thus becoming his own supplier. Coto's success made him a target, however, and in 1981, he was held for 11 days in a ransom kidnapping.

Operating 34 retail outlets by 1987, each averaging around 40 tons of beef and offal sales a month, he opened his first supermarket in Mar de Ajó (a seaside tourist destination). Coto Supermarkets expanded rapidly afterwards, and in 1992, he opened his first hypermarket. The company opened five shopping malls from the late 1990s onwards (each anchored by a Coto hypermarket), as well as a wholesale distribution and production center in Monte Grande.

The chain, a sole proprietorship, remained a private company; a Clarín article at the time, however, outlined that by 1996, it netted over a billion US dollars in sales, and that its net income exceeded US$31 million.

Coto and his chain were reportedly the targets of extortion during 1996 and 1997, when bombs were placed in five outlets by the self-styled People's Revolutionary Organization. More fortunate than other targets, the Coto chain suffered no damages, and the group was later apprehended by police.

The acquisition of the Norte chain by French retailer Carrefour in 2000 left Coto as the largest domestic supermarket retailer in Argentina, and Coto remained third overall (behind Carrefour and Chilean retailer Cencosud).

The largest domestic grocer in a country where inflation is problematic, as well as perennially contentious in politics, Coto was personally criticized in a November 2005 press conference by President Néstor Kirchner, who, discussing retailers' role in rising inflation, referred to the businessman using the company's slogan, yo te conozco ("I know you"). Coto maintained cordial relations with the government, however, and himself later downplayed the inflation issue.
