= Javier Gallego =

- Javier Gallego Garrido
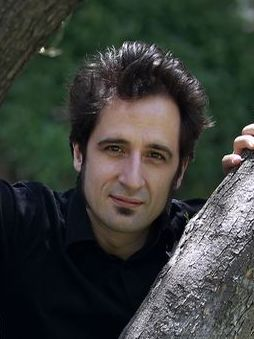
- Born: 1975 (age 50–51); Madrid
- Other name: Crudo
- Education: Complutense University of Madrid
- Occupations: Journalist, radio host, writer, drummer, poet
- Employer(s): eldiario.es La Marea; Yorokobu
- Known for: Carne cruda radio
- Notable work: El grito en el cielo Abolición de la pena de muerte Lo llevamos crudo
- Awards: Premio Ondas 2012; Bienal de Radio de México 2004; Prix Italia 2002; Open Radio 2002

Javier Gallego «Crudo» (Madrid, 1975) is a Spanish journalist, musician and poet. He is specially known for leading and conducting the radio program Carne cruda.

== Biography ==
Javier Gallego graduated in Journalism and has a master in radio by the Complutense University of Madrid. He hosted different radio programs such as De 9 a 9 y media in cadena SER, No somos nadie in M80 Radio or Especia Melange in Radio 3, where he also participated in the production team of the show Cuando Juan y Tula fueron a Siritinga, directed by Carlos Faraco, during the leadership of Federico Volpini. In television, he has led with Pepa Bueno Esta mañana in TVE and scripted Caiga quien caiga in LaSexta.

Since 2009 leads Carne cruda, receiving the Premio Ondas 2012 to the best radio program.

Besides his work in the media, he is the drummer of the band Forastero and has recorded five albums with the groups Dead Capo, Insecto and My Criminal Psycholovers. He has also written several books of poems and collaborated in other publications.

== Books ==
- El grito en el cielo (2016).
- Abolición de la pena de muerte (2013).
- Lo llevamos crudo (2012).

=== Collaborations ===
- Reaccionados: propuestas económicas, sociales y legales para hacer posible otro mundo (2015).
- El relaxing café con leche y otros hitos de la marca España (2013).
- Simpatía por el relato: antología de cuentos escritos por rockeros (2010).
- Trelatos. Ficcionario de Radio 3 (2003).
