= Coto Supermarkets =

Argentine supermarket chain

Coto C.I.C.S.A.

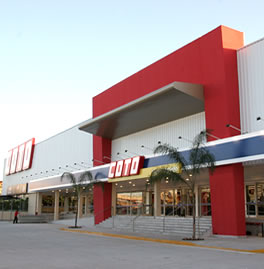
- Hipermarket in Munro, PBA, Argentina
- Type: Private
- Founded: 1970; 56 years ago
- Founder: Alfredo Coto
- Headquarters: Buenos Aires, Argentina
- Key people: Alfredo Coto (owner and president)
- Products: Supermarkets; Wholesale; Logistics; Credit cards
- Brands: Coto
- Revenue: ▲US$ 2.3 billion (2009)
- Owner: Alfredo Coto
- Number of employees: 14,000
- Website: coto.com.ar

Coto C.I.C.S.A., (mostly known for its tradename Coto) is an Argentine supermarket chain founded by Alfredo Coto in 1970 as a butcher shop. The first Coto supermarket was opened in the city of Mar de Ajó in La Costa Partido in 1987. The chain currently has 120 supermarkets, most of them in Greater Buenos Aires.

== Overview ==
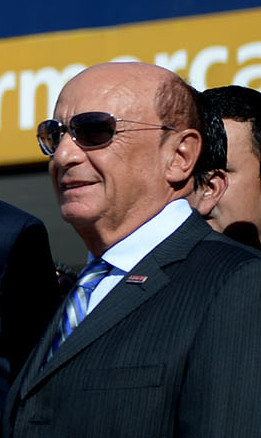
Alfredo Coto, founder and owner

Childhood memories of the downtown Buenos Aires butcher shop opened by Joaquín Coto, an immigrant from Galicia (Spain), inspired his son, Alfredo, to open his own, in the Boedo neighborhood, in 1970. Building on the customer base he and his wife, Gloria, had cultivated through wholesale delivery, Coto owned a slaughterhouse and 34 retail outlets by the time he opened his first supermarket in Mar de Ajó, a seaside tourist destination, in 1987.

Coto Supermarkets expanded rapidly during the 1990s, and by 1996, netted over a billion US dollars in sales. The company opened five shopping malls from the late 1990s onwards (each anchored by a Coto hypermarket), beginning with those in Lanús and Temperley, as well as a wholesale distribution and production center in Monte Grande. The acquisition of the Norte chain by French retailer Carrefour in 2000 left Coto as the largest, domestic supermarket retailer in Argentina, and Coto remained third overall (behind Carrefour and Chilean retailer Cencosud).

Coto's most significant competition (and that of Argentine supermarkets in general) is that of the growing number of Asian Argentine grocers, which by 2010 numbered around 8,000, and whose combined earnings approached those of the Coto chain.

The Coto group enjoys a 17% market share nationwide (reaching 28% in the metro Buenos Aires area), and operates 95 supermarkets, 16 hypermarkets, 5 shopping malls, 3 slaughterhouses, the distribution center, a digital specialized division and a logistics unit of 183 trucks. The company launched the Tarjeta Shopping credit card in 1996, and the TCI store card, in 2005; the two cards were used by over 540,000 clients in late 2007.
