= Santa Isabel (supermarkets) =

Chilean supermarket chain

- Type: Sociedad Anónima Abierta
- Industry: Retail (Grocery), Hypermarket, Retail, Electronics
- Founded: Valparaíso (1976)
- Headquarters: Santiago de Chile
- Products: bakery, dairy, deli, frozen foods, grocery, lottery, meat, pharmacy, produce, seafood, snacks, liquor, electronics
- Parent: Cencosud (2003–present)
- Website: www.santaisabel.cl

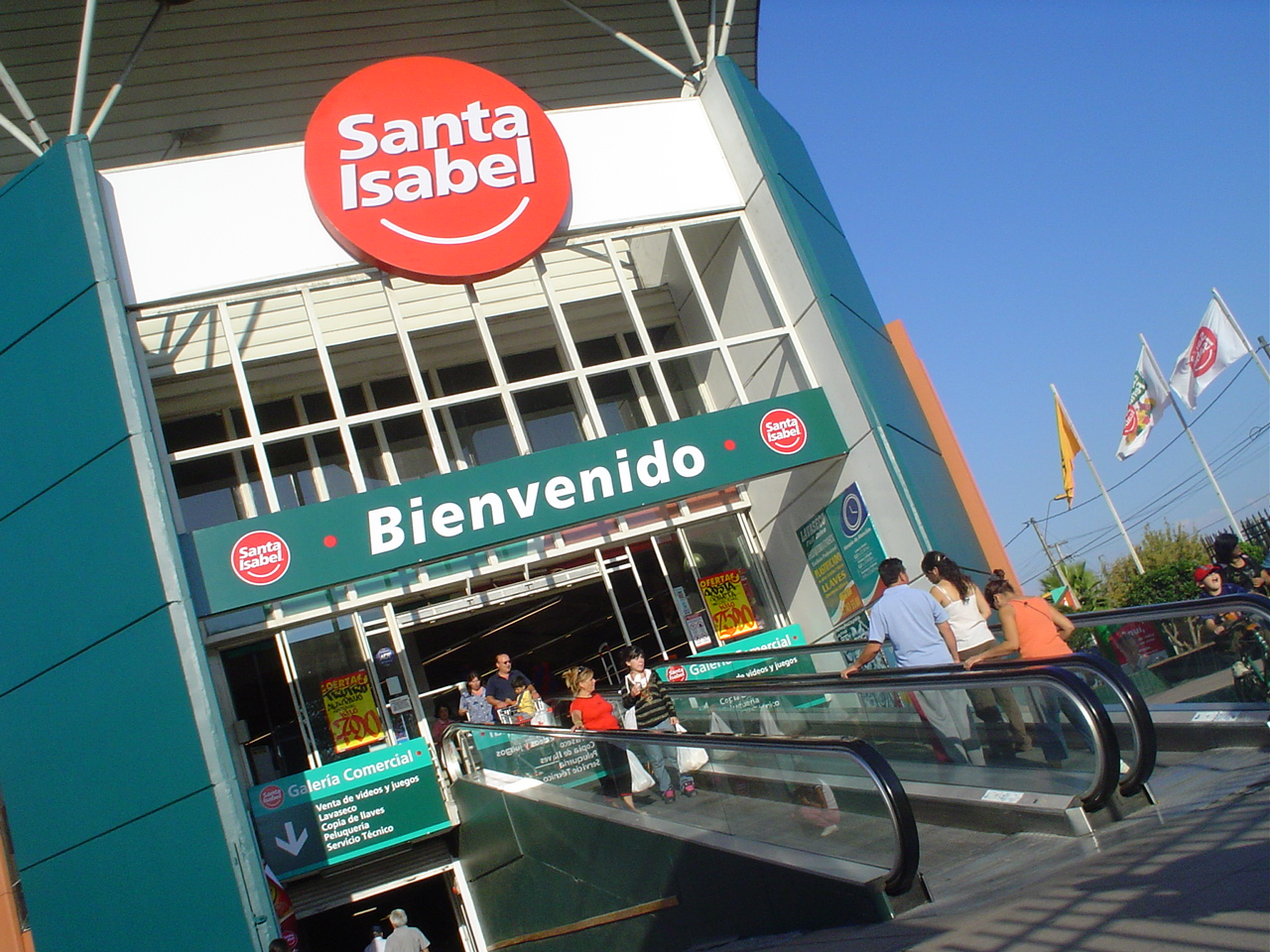
A location in Maipú, Santiago Province.

Supermercados Santa Isabel (Spanish pronunciation: [supeɾmeɾˈkaðos santa jsaˈβel]) is a chain of supermarkets throughout Chile that are owned by Cencosud. The stores have an average area of 1,500 square meters.

== History ==
=== Origins ===
Santa Isabel was founded in Valparaíso, Chile in 1976 by Eduardo Elberg. Until the mid-1990s he maintained organic growth within the Valparaíso Province and the historic Los Lagos province now split into Los Lagos and Los Ríos provinces.

In 1996 an aggressive plan was started to expand the company both nationally and internationally. During this expansion the company went public and entered the Chilean capital region, Peru, and Paraguay under the subsidiary Supermercados Stock.

In July 1996 the company bought Multimarket's 25 locations in Santiago and the country's south under the Multimarket and Gigante monikers. During September of said year Santa Isabel acquired ten Marmentini Letelier stores in the Metropolitana Region and San Antonio areas. At the same time the company expanded to Ecuador.

In 1997 the company was acquired by Velox Group, owner of Argentine stores Disco.

Towards the end of the 1990s the company operated 63 branches in Chile under the Santa Isabel name, and also Hipermercados Stock in Peru and Ecuador.

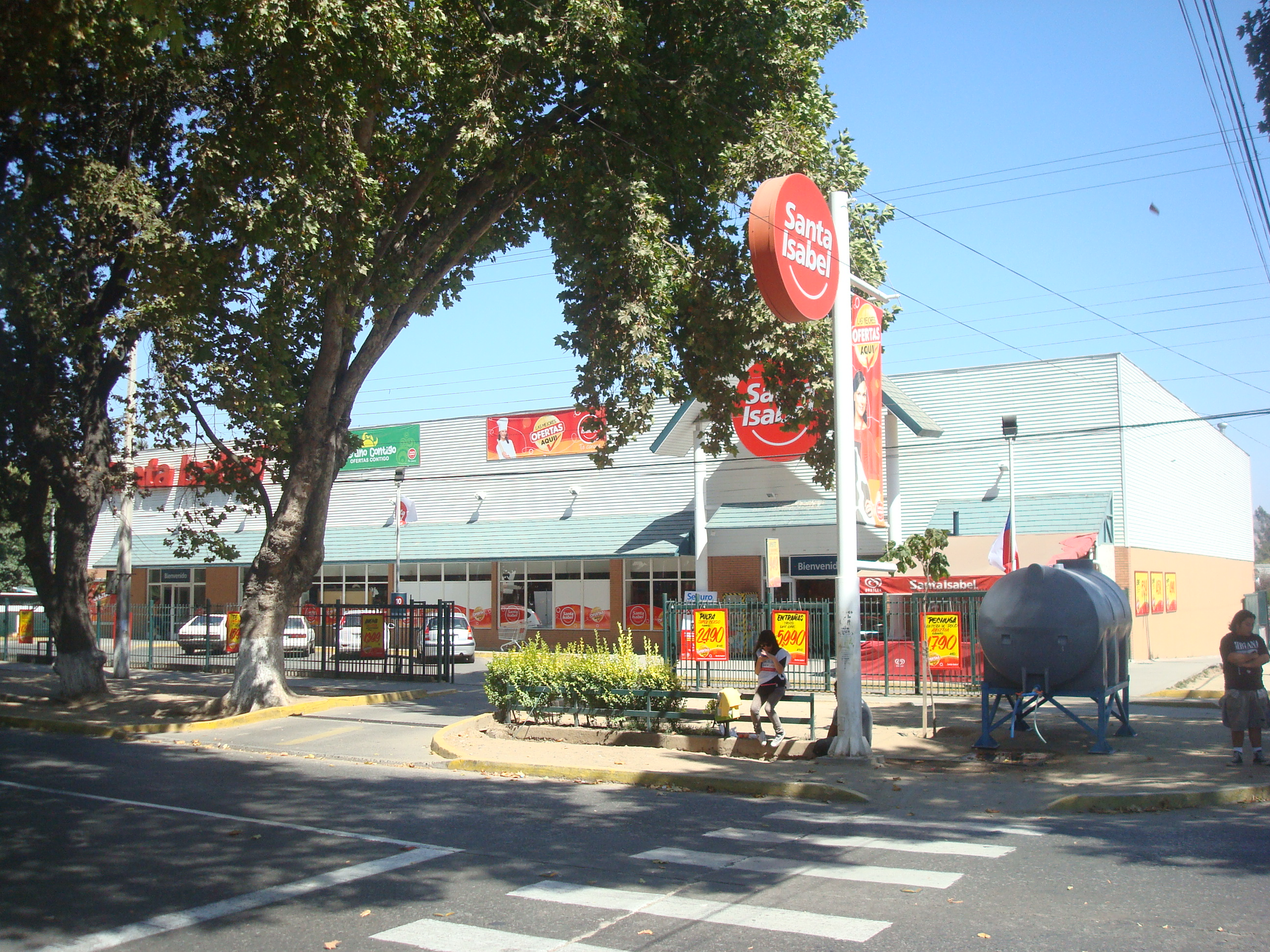
Another location in Limache.

In 1999 it was procured by Ahold during the purchase of Disco Argentina. Previously Santa Isabel had absorbed Supermercados Agas (that also owned Supermercados Uriarte). At this time the company created the Tops en Hipermercados concept which replaced the Stock brand.

=== Cencosud era ===
South American multinational titan Cencosud bought out Santa Isabel and Tops completely in 2003. Santa Isabel locations were used to complement and not compete with the corporation's existing Jumbo Hypermarkets as neighborhood markets.

Later the company bought out Las Brisas, Extra and Monte Carlo supermarkets in 2004 rebranding them Santa Isabels. The same thing was done with the 2006 acquisition of Economax markets.
