= Jumbo (hypermarket) =

Chilean hypermarket chain

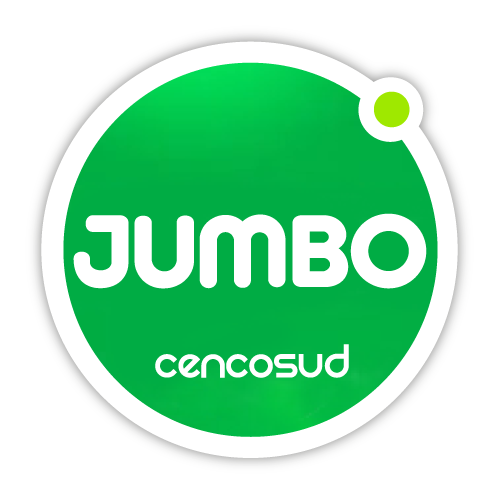

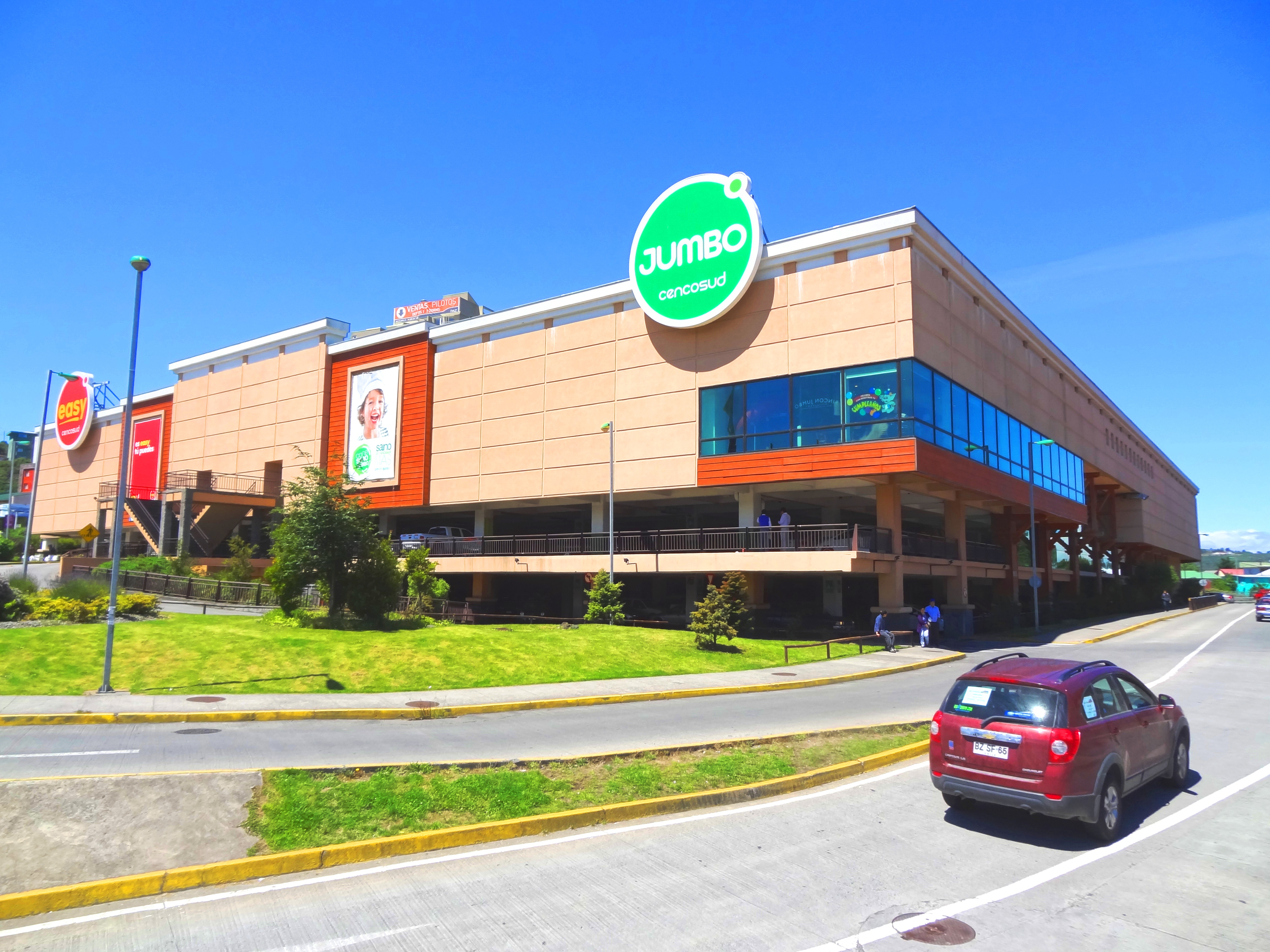
- Jumbo hypermarket in Puerto Montt, 2012
- Type: Sociedad Anónima
- Industry: Retail
- Founded: 1976; 50 years ago in Santiago
- Founder: Cencosud
- Headquarters: Santiago, Chile
- Products: Hypermarket, supermarket
- Owner: Cencosud
- Website: jumbo.cl

Jumbo is a Chilean hypermarket chain with a presence in Chile, Argentina, and Colombia. Founded in 1976 by Horst Paulmann, Jumbo is a subsidiary and pillar of the Cencosud business consortium, which also owns Santa Isabel, Disco, Super Vea, and Metro supermarkets, as well as Easy and Paris stores.

Jumbo's premise is mainly associated with high quality and variety, good service, and a high level of dedication. It has been considered one of the supermarkets that achieves the highest customer satisfaction.

Its main competitors in Chile are the supermarket chains Líder, owned by Walmart Chile, Tottus, owned by the Falabella Group, and Unimarc. In Argentina, its main competitor is the French chain Carrefour, as well as the Argentinean chains Coto and ChangoMas, while in Colombia, it competes with the local chains Éxito, Carulla, Alkosto, and Olímpica.

As of 2020, Jumbo had a workforce of 25,769 employees in its Chilean locations.

== History ==
Horst Paulmann gained experience in the supermarket industry through his family's restaurant Las Brisas, which they acquired in 1952 and managed jointly with his brother Jürgen since 1956. In 1961, Las Brisas transitioned from a restaurant to a supermarket format, similar to what Almac had been doing in Santiago since 1957. The chain expanded throughout the country in the following years.

Later, the Paulmann brothers migrated to Santiago and founded the first Jumbo, which opened on September 9, 1976, on Avenida Kennedy 9001 in the Las Condes commune of Santiago, Chile, where the Alto Las Condes shopping center is now located. Their objective was to offer a wider range of products than was possible to find in other supermarkets. To increase visibility, they created the supermarket mascot Jumbito, based on a famous pachyderm of the same name from an old New York circus. Later, the brothers separated their businesses, with Horst keeping Jumbo and Jürgen keeping Las Brisas. More stores were added, such as the one on Avenida Francisco Bilbao on August 23, 1980. The company Cencosud was established in 1978, and in 1982, the first hypermarket outside of Chile was opened in Buenos Aires.

In June 2011, a new store called "Jumbo Madero Harbour" was opened in Buenos Aires, which became the chain's first "premium supermarket." This store measures 13336 m², while regular stores typically range around 8000 m², and focuses on selling fresh and frozen foods, seafood, groceries, ready-to-eat meals, perfumes, cleaning supplies, wine, and imported products.

On October 18, 2012, the Cencosud group announced the acquisition of Carrefour Colombia's assets for €2.6 billion, effectively changing the brand from Carrefour to Jumbo and Metro over the next 8 months following the purchase.

In 2012, workers at Jumbo went on strike demanding a wage increase and various improvements in the work environment. The first national strike took place on April 4, followed by another on October 8 in Santiago, Rancagua, and Viña del Mar. On October 23, workers supported by the Workers' United Center of Chile denounced anti-union pressures in stores in the central-southern region of the country. On October 30, 98% of 1,700 Jumbo workers across Chillán, Hualpén, Concepción, Los Ángeles, Osorno, and Temuco voted to join the strike, dissatisfied with the salary adjustment offered by the company. Finally, on November 7, an agreement was reached with the company, suspending the planned strike for that day.

== Private-label brands ==
Cencosud has a wide range of private label brands, which are exclusively offered in its commercial locations. These brands provide a diverse mix of products ranging from food to clothing, household appliances, cleaning products, and pet supplies.

The main brands offered at Jumbo are: Cuisine & Co, Cuisine & Co Ready!, Máxima, Jumbo, Nex (electronics), HomeCare (cleaning products), Urb (clothing), Pet's Fun (pet supplies), and Club Maxx (books).

These private label brands can also be found at other formats of the company such as Santa Isabel, Easy, Paris, Johnson, Metro, Wong, Disco, and Vea.

== Locations ==
=== Chile ===
- Santiago de Chile
  - Las Condes
    - Kennedy
    - Paseo Los Domínicos
    - Francisco Bilbao Avenue
  - Puente Alto
    - Concha y Toro
    - Plaza Puente
  - La Florida
  - Maipú
    - Mall Arauco Maipú
    - Pajaritos Avenue
  - Peñalolén
  - La Reina
  - La Dehesa
  - Providencia
    - Costanera Center
  - Ñuñoa
    - Portal Ñuñoa
  - El Llano, San Miguel
- Other Cities
  - Arica
  - Iquique
  - Calama
  - Antofagasta
    - Antofagasta Angamos
    - Antofagasta Punto de Encuentro
  - Copiapó
  - La Serena
  - Valparaíso
  - Viña del Mar
  - El Belloto, Quilpué
  - Aconcagua, Los Andes
  - Rancagua
  - Curicó
  - Talca
  - Chillán
  - Concepción
  - Temuco
  - Valdivia
  - Osorno
  - Puerto Varas
  - Puerto Montt

=== Argentina ===
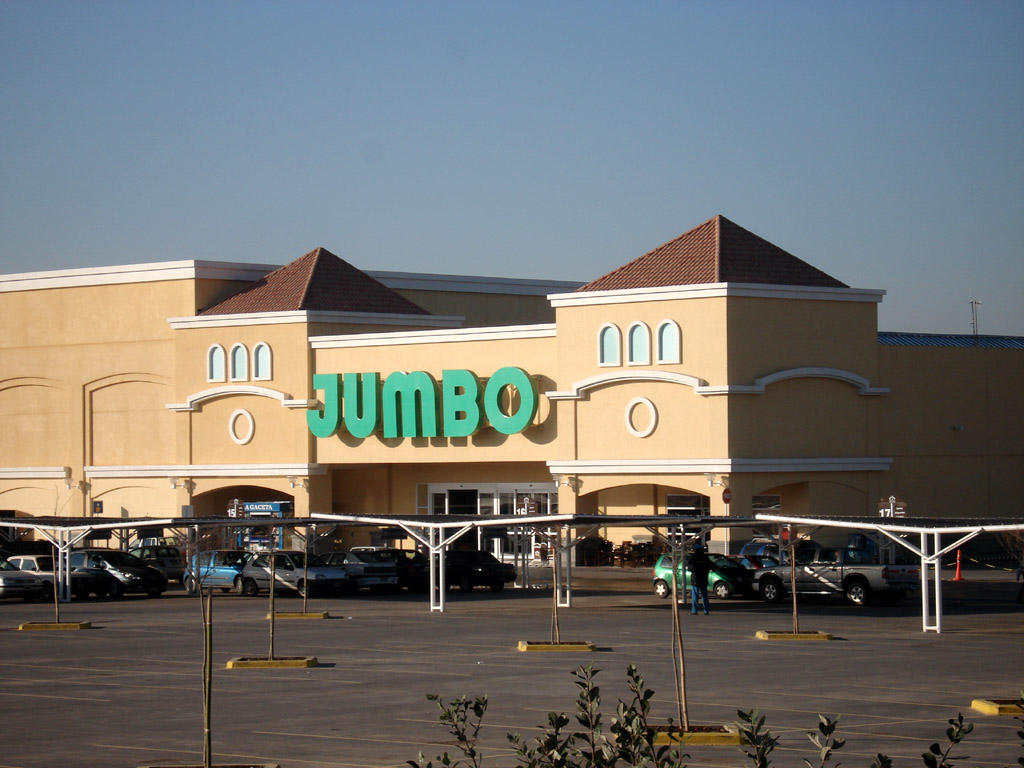
Jumbo hypermarket in Yerba Buena, Tucumán, 2007

- Greater Buenos Aires
  - Escobar
  - Pilar
  - Martínez
  - San Martín
  - Morón
  - Federal Capital
  - Lomas de Zamora
  - Quilmes
- Other Cities
  - Mendoza
  - Neuquén
  - Santa Fe
  - Tucumán
  - Salta

=== Colombia ===
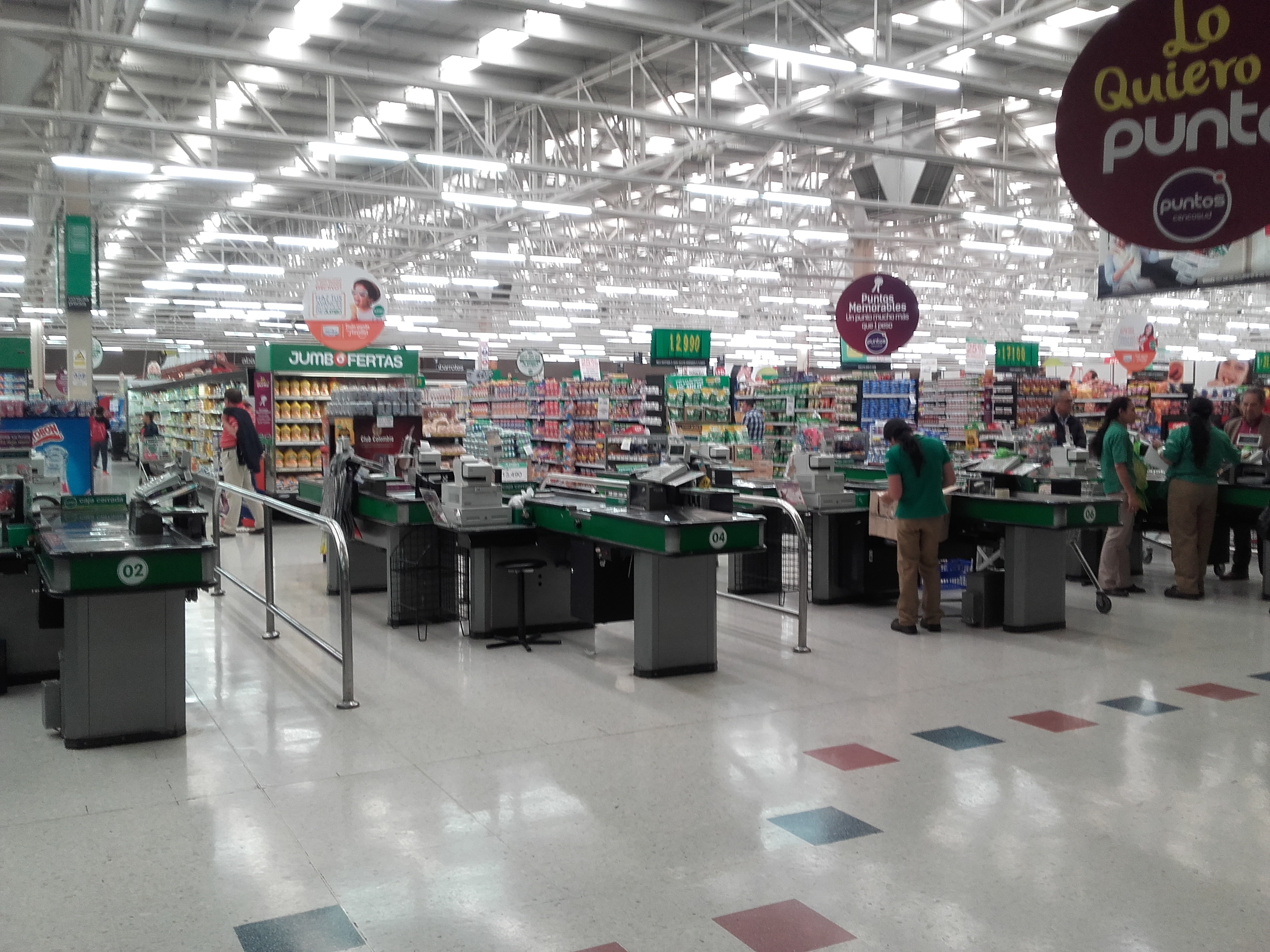
Interior of a Jumbo supermarket in Colombia, 2016

- Bogotá
  - Calle 80
  - Calle 170
  - Carrera 30
  - Hayuelos
  - Santa Ana
  - Suba
  - Santafé Bogotá
  - Titán Plaza
  - Bulevar
  - Atlantis
- Antioquía
  - La 65, Medellín
  - Premium Plaza, Medellín
  - Santafé, Medellín
  - Las Vegas, Envigado
  - Gualanday, Rionegro
- Valle del Cauca
  - Valle de Lilí, Cali
  - Chipichape, Cali
  - Limonar, Cali
- Atlántico
  - Altos del Prado, Barranquilla
  - Americano, Barranquilla
  - Buenavista, Barranquilla
- Bolívar
  - Caribe Plaza, Cartagena de Indias
  - Mall Plaza El Castillo, Cartagena de Indias
- Boyacá
  - Unicentro Tunja, Tunja
- Casanare
  - Unicentro Yopal, Yopal
- Cauca
  - Campanario, Popayán
- Cesar
  - Guatapurí Plaza, Valledupar
- Cundinamarca
  - Chía
  - Girardot
- Huila
  - Séptima Avenida Centro Comercial, Neiva
- Magdalena
  - Ocean Mall, Santa Marta
- Risaralda
  - Avenida del Río, Pereira
  - Unicentro Pereira, Pereira
- Santander
  - Megamall, Bucaramanga
  - Cabecera, Bucaramanga
  - Cañaveral, Floridablanca
  - San Silvestre, Barrancabermeja
