= Easy (store) =

Easy S.A.
- Type: subsidiary of Cencosud
- Industry: Retail trade
- Founded: (1993)
- Headquarters: Santiago, Chile
- Key people: Carlos Wulf, General manager
- Products: Home improvement construction materials
- Revenue: US$ 1.614 million (2010)
- Number of employees: 8,400 (2009)
- Parent: Cencosud
- Website: Easy Chile; Easy Argentina; Easy Colombia

Easy Hogar y Construcción is a chain of South American home centers. The company was founded in Argentina in 1993, in Chile in 1994 and in Colombia in 2007, by Chilean conglomerate Cencosud.

== History ==
Easy, based in Florida, Chile, was founded in Argentina in 1993 and the following year opened its first store in Chile. In 2001, it bought out The Home Depot's branches in Argentina and Chile and rebranded them as Easy. The company currently has 82 branches in South America, 29 in Chile, 49 in Argentina (plus 10 Blaisten construction supply stores), and 4 in Colombia.

== Locations ==
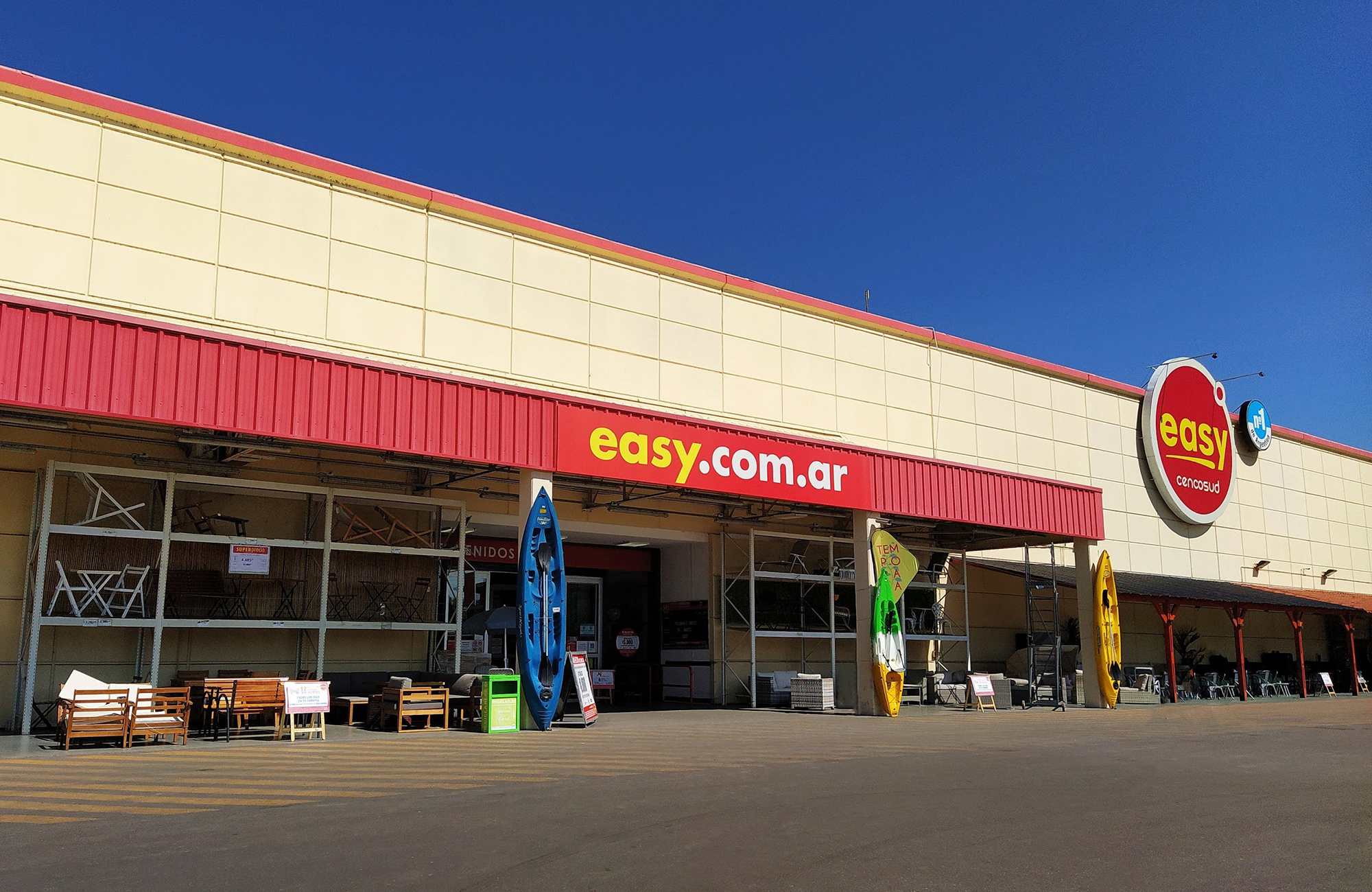
An Easy storefront in Argentina

=== Argentina ===
- Buenos Aires City:
  - Escalada, Parque Brown Factory Shopping
  - Palermo, Portal Palermo Shopping
  - Vélez Sársfield, Carrefour Vélez Sársfield
  - Warnes, Carrefour Warnes
  - Constituyentes, Wal-Mart Constituyentes
  - Barracas, Super Vea Barracas
  - Caballito
  - Almagro
- Buenos Aires Province:
  - Caseros
  - San Isidro (in Villa Adelina)
  - Lomas de Zamora, Portal Lomas Shopping
  - San Martín, San Martin Factory Shopping Center
  - Quilmes, Quilmes Factory Shopping
  - Morón, Plaza Oeste Shopping
  - Ituzaingó
  - Pilar, Las Palmas Del Pilar Shopping
  - Avellaneda Alto Avellaneda, Shopping
  - San Justo, Walmart San Jusrto
  - Belén de Escobar, Portal Escobar Shopping.
  - La Tablada, Walmart Tablada
  - Don Torcuato
  - Avellaneda, Walmart Parque Avellaneda
  - Moreno
  - San Miguel
  - José C. Paz
  - Canning
- Rosario, San Miguel de Tucumán, Neuquén, Mendoza, Trelew, Santa Fe, San Juan, San Luis, Córdoba, La Rioja, General Roca

=== Chile ===
- Santiago:
  - Portal La Dehesa Mall, Lo Barnechea
  - Alto Las Condes Mall, Las Condes
  - Portal La Reina, Las Condes
  - Paseo Quilín Mall, Peñalolén
  - San Miguel
  - Florida Center Mall, La Florida
  - Arauco Maipú Mall, Maipú
  - Portal Maipú Mall, Maipú
  - Quilicura
  - Puente Alto
  - Portal Ochagavía, Pedro Aguirre Cerda
  - Costanera Center Mall, Providencia
- Antofagasta, Copiapó, La Serena, Viña del Mar, Valparaíso, Quilpué, Quillota, Los Andes, Rancagua, Curicó, Talca, Linares, Chillán, Los Ángeles, Hualpén, Temuco, Osorno, Puerto Montt

=== Colombia ===
- Bogotá:
  - Éxito El Cortijo
  - Éxito Norte calle 170
  - Éxito Las Américas
  - Centro Comercial Centro Mayor
