= Cotto (surname) =

Cotto is a surname. Notable people with the surname include:

- Abner Cotto (born 1987), Puerto Rican professional boxer
- Antonio Correa Cotto (1926–1952), Puerto Rican outlaw
- Cisco Cotto (born 1975), American news anchor and pastor
- Edgar Aroldo Cotto Gonzalez, Guatemalan footballer
- Henry Cotto (born 1961), American professional baseball player
- José Juan Cotto (born 1977), Puerto Rican professional boxer
- José Cotto (born 1977), Puerto Rican professional boxer
- Miguel Cotto (born 1980), Puerto Rican professional boxer-(the Cotto boxers are brothers)
- Vir Cotto, a character from the Babylon 5 universe

== See also ==
- Cotto (disambiguation)
