= Cotto =

Cotto may refer to:

- Cotto (name), a surname common amongst those of Spanish, Portuguese, Italian, French or Sephardic Jewish ancestry
- Cotto (material), a type of Italian brick tile
- Cotto salami, a cooked variety of salami
- Cotto Laurel, a barriada in Ponce, Puerto Rico

== See also ==
- Coto (disambiguation)
- Crudo (disambiguation)
