= Wong (supermarket) =

Peruvian supermarket chain

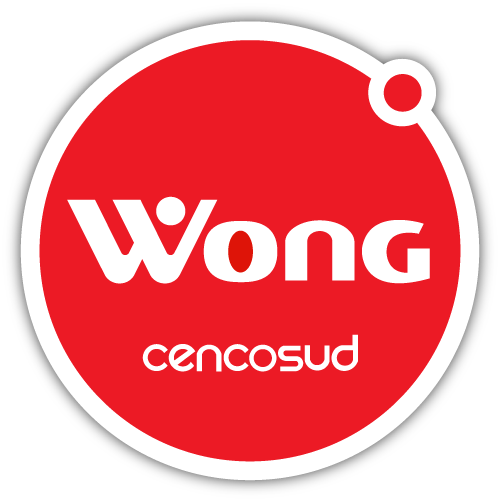
- Company type: Anonymous Society
- Industry: Retail
- Founded: 1942
- Products: Supermarkets
- Website: www.wong.pe

Wong (Spanish pronunciation: [ˈwoŋg]) is a supermarket chain in Peru. Known until 2005 as E. Wong, it was started as a small store in 1942 by Chinese Peruvians in a residential area of the San Isidro District in Lima.

== History and development ==
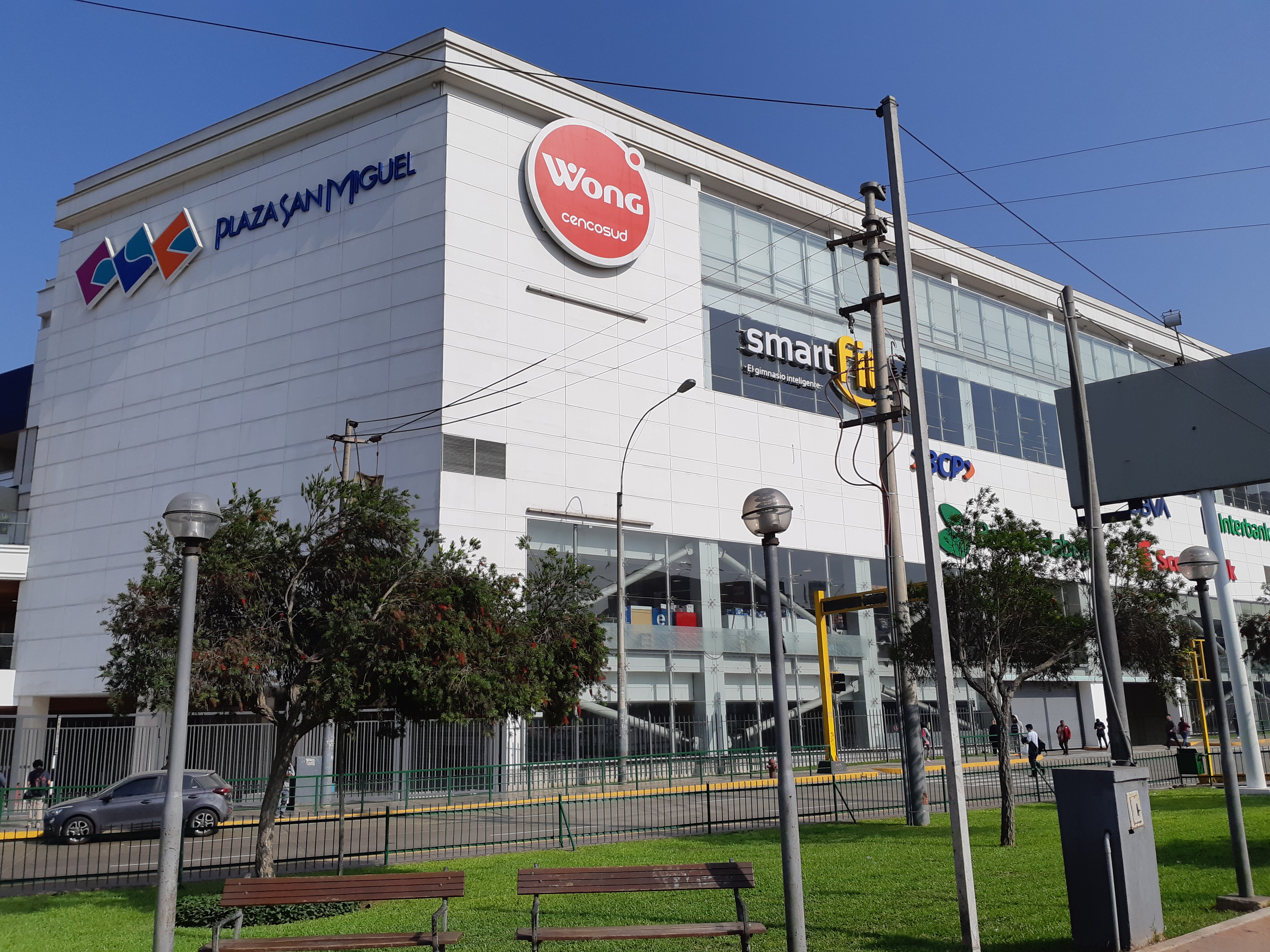
Store in Plaza San Miguel, Lima

In 1942, Erasmo Wong Chiang Moreno, a Chinese-Peruvian, opened a store at a corner on the tenth block of 2 de Mayo Avenue, in a residential area in San Isidro, a district of Lima. The family business was succeeded by a store operating under the name of "E. Wong" at an old house at the Óvalo Gutiérrez, a roundabout in Miraflores, which opened in 1982. By 1990, five stores had been opened and two years later all the stores were expanded. In 1993, the company purchased two competing chains, Galax and Todos, expanding again in 1995 and operating 15 stores by 1999 with the inauguration of another building in Las Gardenias neighbourhood in Santiago de Surco. In 2004 it opened its branch in the Asia district, considered the most expensive in the country.

All stores operated by the chain were closed on July 6, 2005, and immediately reinaugurated with its new name of Wong. Two years later, the store was acquired by Chilean company Cencosud for 500 million dollars. This was originally denied by the chain's founder himself, and was also received negatively by the Peruvian public, marking the beginning of a slow decline in the chain's overall market share.

In 2016, a fire at the supermarket on Asia Boulevard completely destroyed the store's interior, being put out by 11 p.m. After extensive restoration works, the store reopened a week later.

The Gran Corso de Fiestas Patrias, a large parade held annually a few weeks before July 28, the day of Peruvian independence, is organized by Wong and attended by more than 100,000 people. The parade is usually celebrated in Miraflores and ends with a fireworks display.
