= Crudo (band) =

- Years active: 2008
- Members: Mike Patton and Dan the Automator

Crudo is a project featuring Mike Patton (Fantômas, Mr. Bungle, Faith No More, Tomahawk, Peeping Tom) and Dan the Automator (Gorillaz, Dr. Octagon, Handsome Boy Modeling School). Crudo made their stage debut playing a secret warmup show in San Francisco at Great American Music Hall on May 22, 2008. They also performed at the 2008 Sasquatch! Music Festival. Their music has been described as "strange and bizarre R&B".

A sample of the song "Let's Go" was placed on the band's MySpace profile in August 2008, but as of May 2013, an album has yet to be released or announced and the MySpace profile remains inactive.

The band was mentioned in the film Obsessed starring Beyoncé Knowles, Ali Larter, and Idris Elba, whose character exclaims "Dan the Automator is king!".
