= Costanera Center =

Commercial and business complex in Santiago, Chile

Coordinates: 33°25′03″S 70°36′24″W

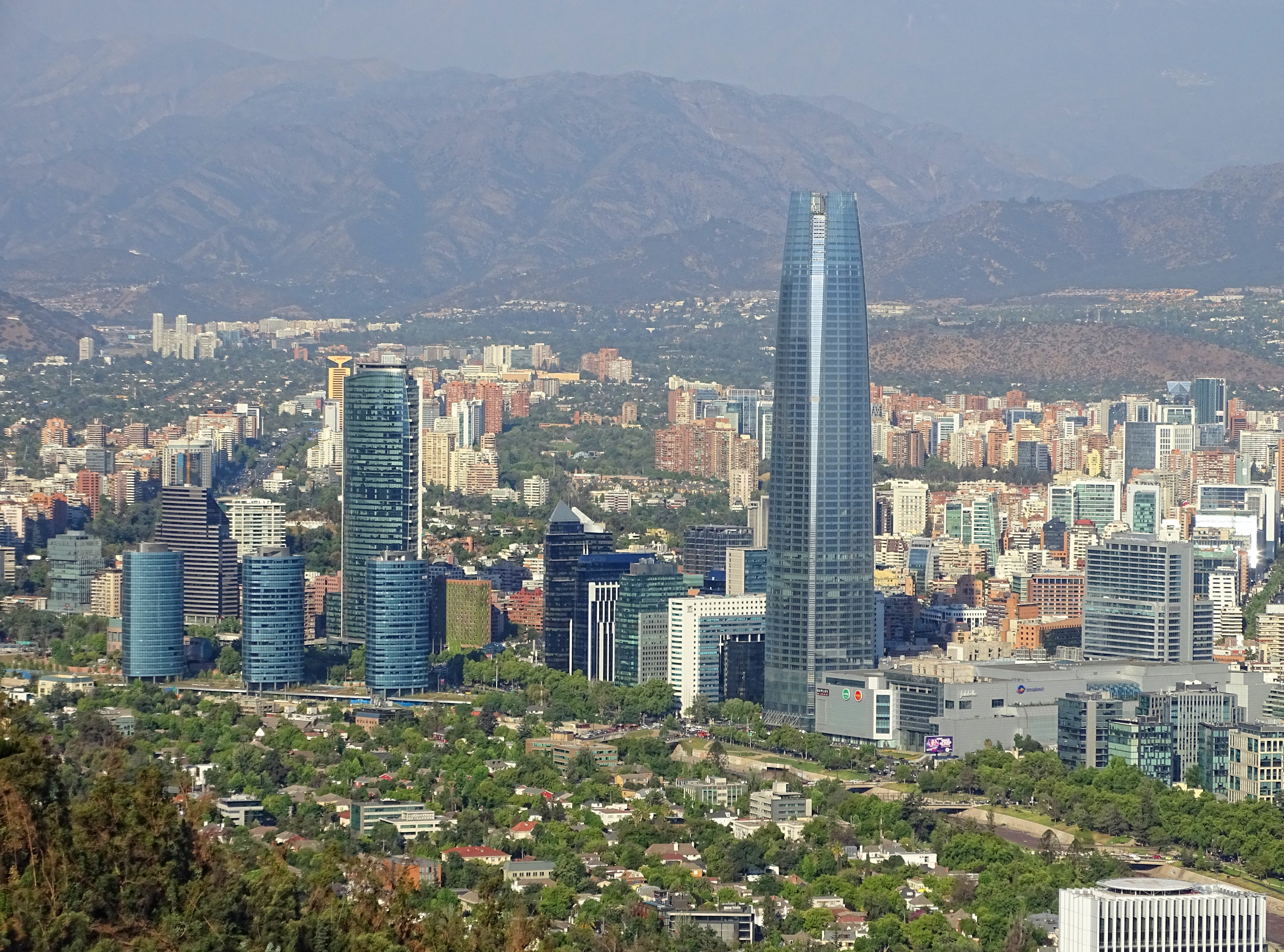
- Costanera Center complex

General information
- Status: Completed
- Type: Commercial, business, retail
- Location: Providencia, Santiago, Chile
- Construction started: 2006
- Construction stopped: 2009
- Completed: 2012
- Owner: Cencosud

Height
- Height: 300 m (980 ft)

Technical details
- Floor count: 6

Design and construction
- Architect: César Pelli

The Costanera Center is a commercial and business complex located in the commune of Providencia, Santiago, Chile. Owned by Cencosud, the complex consists of four skyscrapers, including the Gran Torre Santiago, two high-end hotels, an office building, and a six-floor shopping mall.

The Gran Torre Santiago, which stands as the tallest of the four buildings, was designed by renowned argentine architect César Pelli and measures 300 metres (980 ft) tall. It is the second tallest building in Latin America, following Torres Obispado, and the fifth tallest in the Southern Hemisphere, after Indonesia's Autograph Tower and Luminary Tower in Jakarta and Australia's Q1 on the Gold Coast and Australia 108 in Melbourne. One of the other buildings in the complex is 170 metres (560 ft) high, while the other is only four stories.

Construction of the Costanera Center was temporarily halted in January 2009 due to the late 2000s recession. The developers were concerned that they would not be able to find tenants if completed by the originally proposed date. After the recession ended, Cencosud announced that construction would resume on December 16, 2009. The construction process restarted at the end of 2010.

On February 14, 2012, the Gran Torre Santiago reached 300 meters and became the tallest building in South and Latin America. The mall in the complex, designed by Canadian retail agency Watt International, opened on June 12, 2012, and is the largest in South America. It comprises six floors and includes the Jumbo hypermarket.

== Gallery ==
Costanera Center (right) and Titanium La Portada (left)

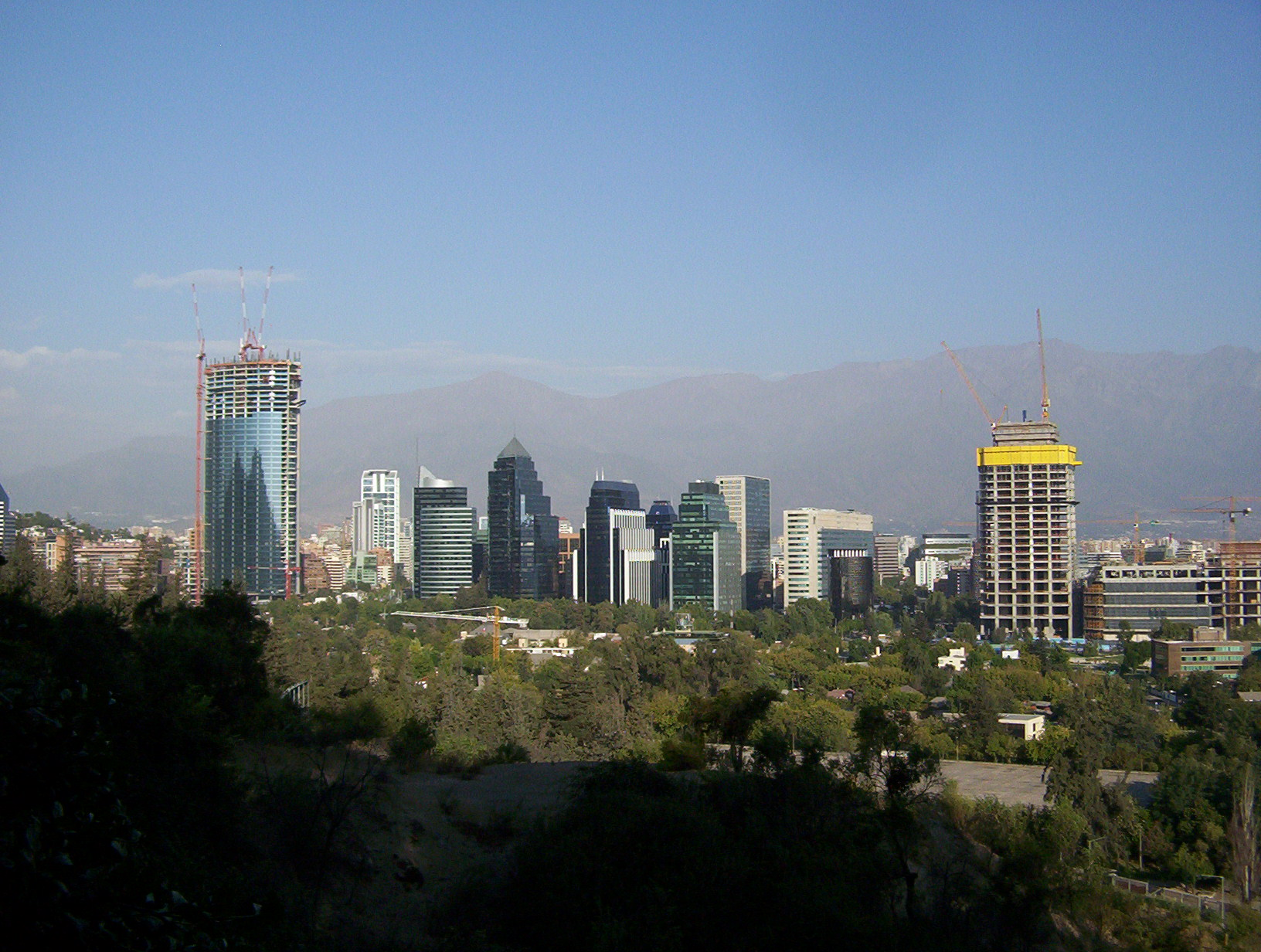
Progress of the Costanera Center (right) and Titanium La Portada (left), Feb. 14, 2009

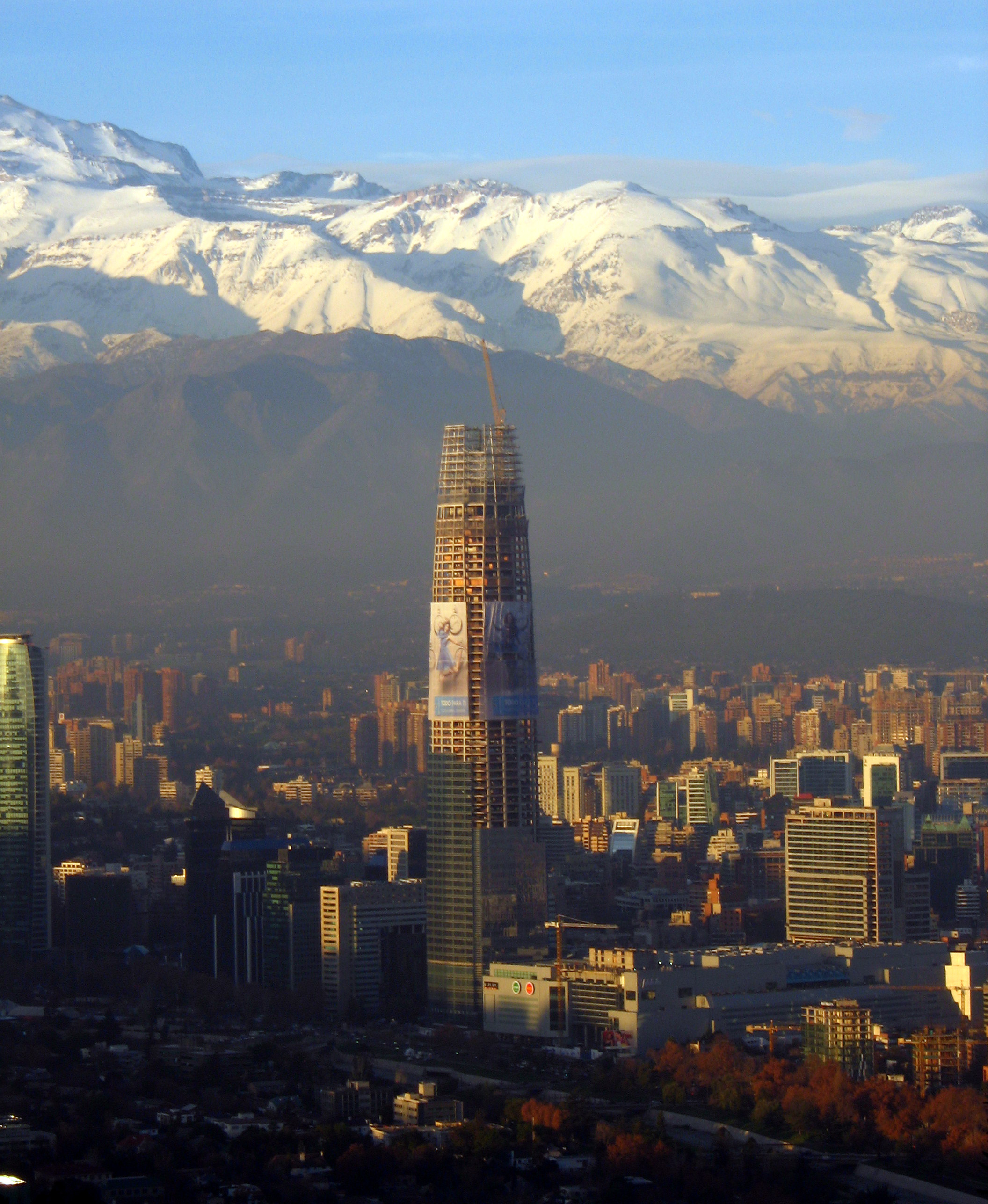
Costanera Center in June 2012

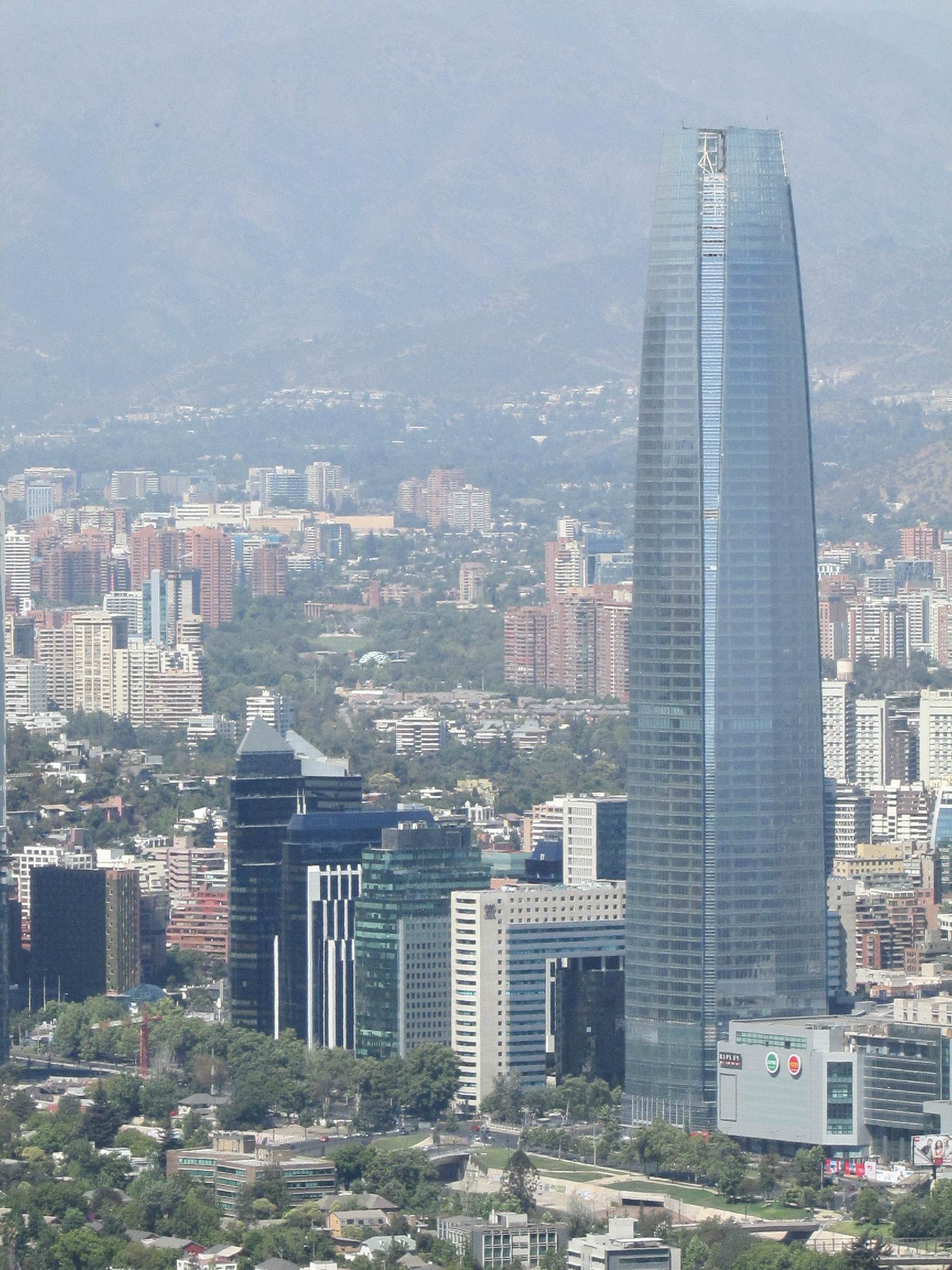
Costanera Center in January 2014

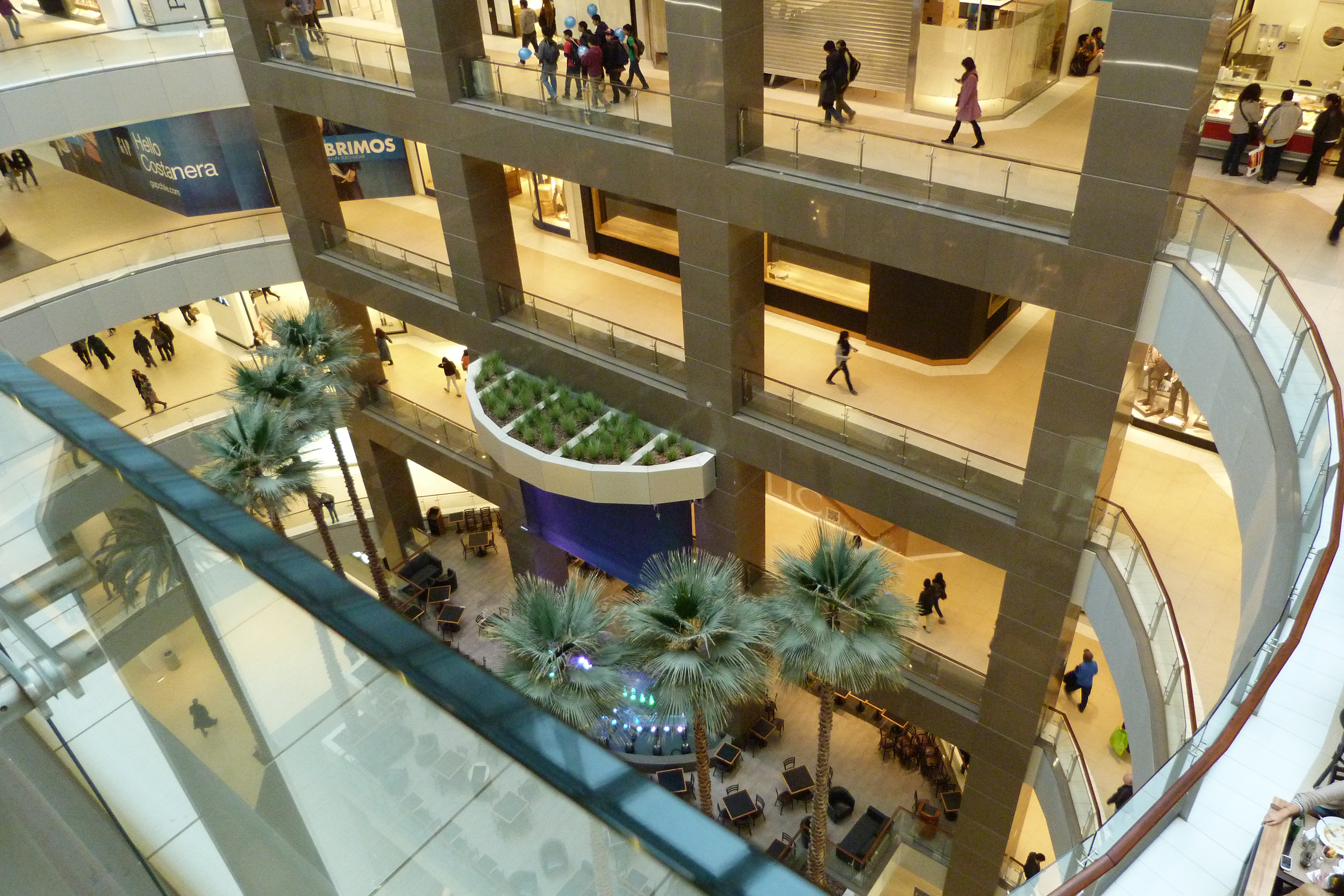
Costanera Center mall
