= Cencosud =

Multinational retail company

Centros Comerciales Sudamericanos S.A.
- Type: Public
- Traded as: BCS: CENCOSUD; S&P Latin America 40 component
- Industry: Retail
- Founded: 1960; 66 years ago
- Headquarters: Santiago, Chile
- Areas served: Argentina; Brazil; Chile; Colombia; Peru; United States
- Key people: Horst Paulmann Kemna
- Products: Hypermarkets; Supermarkets; Shopping malls Department stores
- Revenue: ▲US$ 19.0 billion (2012)
- Net income: ▼US$ 562.6 million (2012)
- Number of employees: 126,530
- Website: www.cencosud.com

Cencosud S.A. is a publicly traded retail company based in Chile. It is the largest retail company in Chile and the third largest listed retail company in Latin America, competing with the Brazilian Companhia Brasileira de Distribuição and the Mexican Walmart de México y Centroamérica as one of the largest retail companies in the region. The company has more than 1045 stores in Latin America.

== History ==
By the end of 2006, the operations of the company included 65 Jumbo hypermarkets, 165 Santa Isabel supermarkets; 249 Disco, Vea and Jumbo supermarkets; 60 Easy home improvement stores; 36 Paris department stores; 27 shopping malls and 52 offices of Banco Paris bank, totaling a sales area of 1.8 million square meters, or 19,375,038.75 square feet. It has more than 4.3 million active credit card accounts, issued under the brand Tarjeta Cencosud (in Chile, Peru and Argentina), Tarjeta Cencosud Colpatria (Colombia) and Cartão Cencosud Bradesco (Brazil).

By the end of 2007, several new stores had been opened in Chile, Argentina and Peru, and the company acquired Wong supermarkets, the largest retailer in Peru, and GBarbosa, a Brazilian retailer.

In August 2011, Cencosud announced the acquisition of Johnson department stores.

In 2022, Cencosud acquired a majority controlling share in The Fresh Market, a chain of specialty grocery stores in the United States. At the time of the announcement, The Fresh Market operated 160 stores across 22 states. In September 2025, Cencosud acquired the remaining 33% stake of the company for $295 million.

== Brands ==
Cencosud operates upscale Paris department stores, the Costanera Center financial center, Easy home improvement and hardware stores, Jumbo hypermarkets, Santa Isabel supermarkets, in Chile. The company also operates Bretas supermarkets, G Barbosa super and hypermarkets, Prezunic supermarkets and Perini supermarkets in Brazil, Vea and Disco supermarkets in Argentina, Wong and Metro in Peru, and in 2012 acquired the Carrefour hypermarket operations in Colombia, which changed branding to Jumbo.
