= Nazi boycott of Jewish businesses =

Attempted boycott in 1933

- Part of Nazi Germany's anti-Jewish actions, including Anti-Jewish legislation in pre-war Nazi Germany, Racial policy of Nazi Germany, Nuremberg Laws, Kristallnacht, and the Holocaust, and of the aftermath of Political violence in Germany (1918–1933)
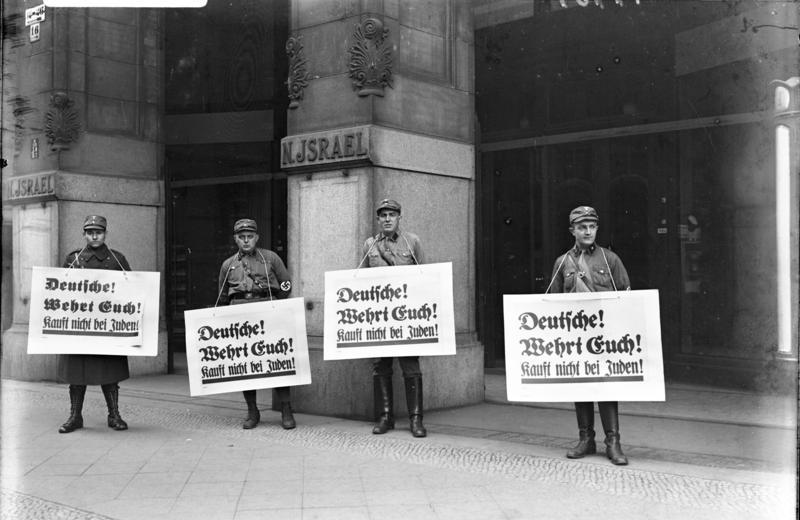
- Nazi SA paramilitaries outside Israel's Department Store in Berlin. The signs read: "Germans! Defend yourselves! Don't buy from Jews."
- Native name: Judenboykott; Aprilboykott
- Date: 1 April 1933; 93 years ago
- Location: Pre-war Nazi Germany
- Target: Jewish businesses and professionals
- Organized by: Nazi Party
- Participants: Sturmabteilung; Schutzstaffel; Der Stahlhelm, Bund der Frontsoldaten; Hitler Youth

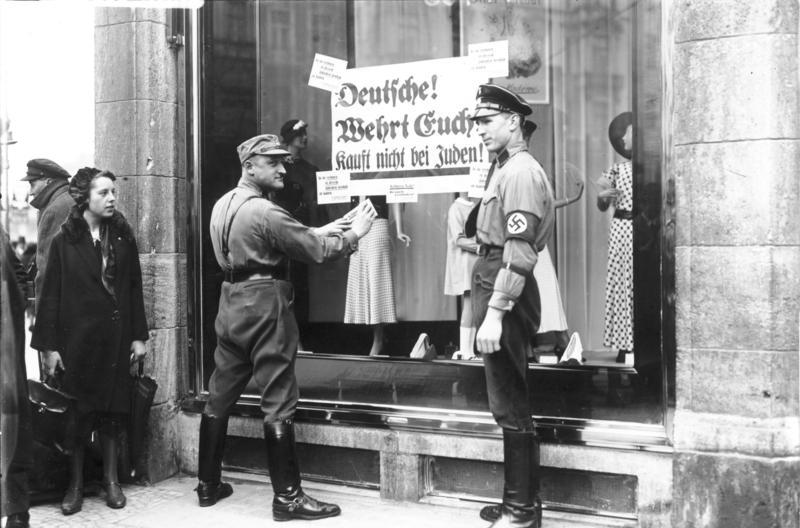
SA paramilitaries outside a Berlin store posting signs with: "Deutsche! Wehrt Euch! Kauft nicht bei Juden!" ("Germans! Defend yourselves! Don't buy from Jews!").

The Nazi boycott of Jewish businesses (German: Judenboykott) was a nationwide boycott on various commercial establishments such as shops, warehouses, banks, doctor's offices, law firms, and notaries across Germany on 1 April 1933. It was an early governmental action against the Jews of Germany by the new National Socialist government, and was claimed to be a defensive reaction to the anti-Nazi boycott the prior month.

The boycott was largely unsuccessful, taking place over a single Saturday, due to which most Jewish businesses were closed for Sabbath. Throughout the day, SA and SS blocked entry to businesses, vandalising and looting several storefronts, as well as physically assaulting several Jewish business owners and those suspected of buying from them. The boycott unofficially ended the same evening and was placed on hold for three days. As the German population continued to use Jewish businesses during this break, the action was disengaged prematurely.

Although functionally a failure, the boycott revealed the intent of the Nazis to undermine the viability of Jews in Germany and is considered a first step in the Final Solution. It was the first major step in what would become a state-managed campaign of ever-increasing harassment, arrests, systematic pillaging, forced transfer of ownership to Nazi Party activists (managed by the Chamber of Commerce), and ultimately murder of Jewish business owners. In Berlin alone, there were 50,000 Jewish-owned businesses.

== Earlier boycotts ==
Antisemitism in Germany grew increasingly pervasive after the First World War and was most prevalent in the universities. By 1921, the German student union Deutscher Hochschulring barred Jews from membership. Since the bar was racial, it included Jews who had converted to Christianity. The bar was challenged by the government, leading to a referendum in which 76% of the student members voted for the exclusion.

At the same time, Nazi newspapers began agitating for a boycott of Jewish businesses, and anti-Jewish boycotts became a regular feature of 1920s regional German politics with right-wing German parties becoming closed to Jews.

From 1931 to 1932, SA Brownshirt thugs physically prevented customers from entering Jewish shops, windows were systematically smashed and Jewish shop owners threatened. During the Christmas holiday season of 1932, the central office of the Nazi party organized a nationwide boycott. In addition, German businesses, particularly large organizations like banks, insurance companies, and industrial firms such as Siemens, increasingly refused to employ Jews. Many hotels, restaurants and cafes banned Jews from entering and the resort island of Borkum banned Jews anywhere on the island. Such behavior was common in pre-war Europe; however in Germany, it reached new heights.

== Anti-Nazi boycott of 1933 ==
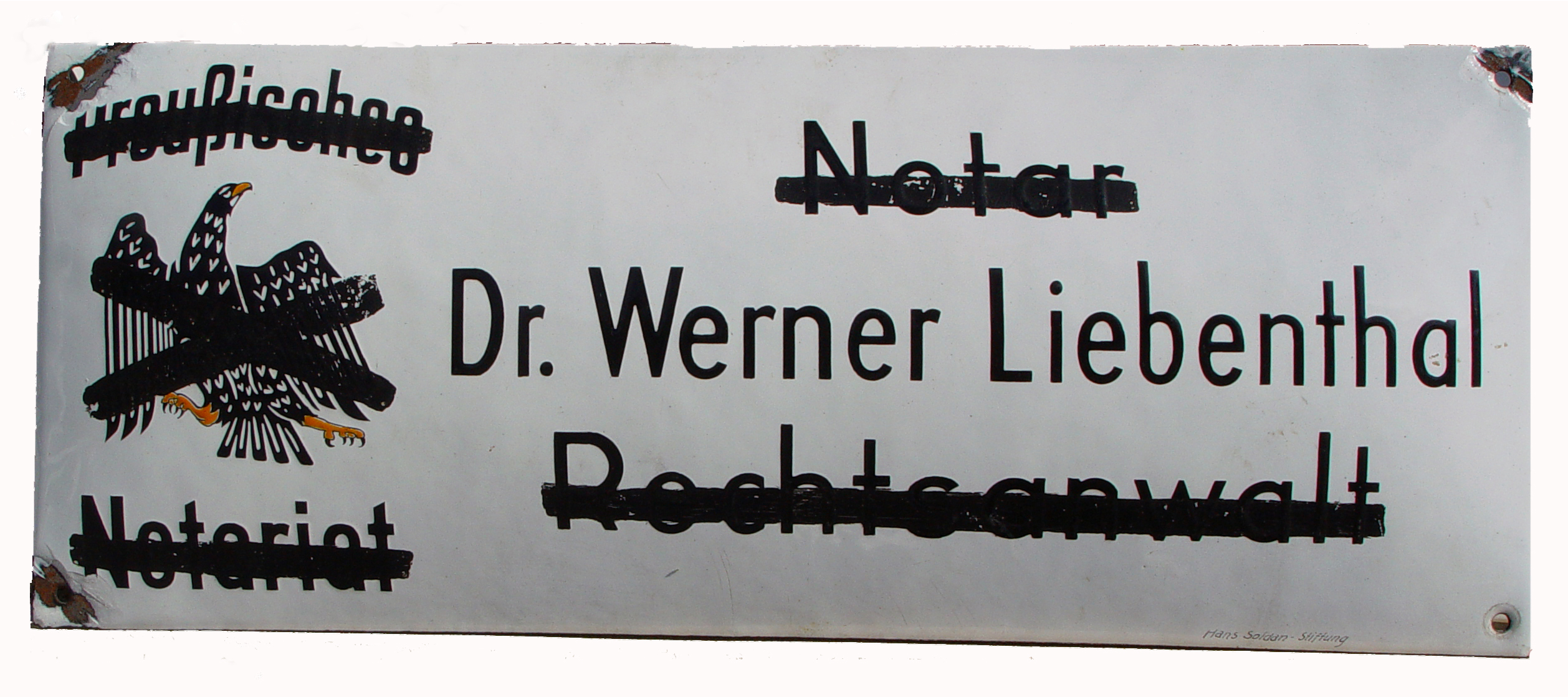
Nameplate of Dr. Werner Liebenthal, notary and advocate. The plate was hung outside his office on Martin Luther Str, Schöneberg, Berlin. In 1933, following the Law for the Restoration of the Professional Civil Service the plate was painted black by the Nazis, who boycotted Jewish-owned offices.

The Anti-Nazi Boycott commencing in March 1933 was a boycott of Nazi products by foreign critics of the Nazi Party in response to antisemitism in Nazi Germany following the rise of Adolf Hitler, commencing with his appointment as Chancellor of Germany on 30 January 1933. Those in the United States, the United Kingdom and other places worldwide who opposed Hitler's policies developed the boycott and its accompanying protests to encourage Nazi Germany to end the regime's anti-Jewish practices.

== National boycott ==
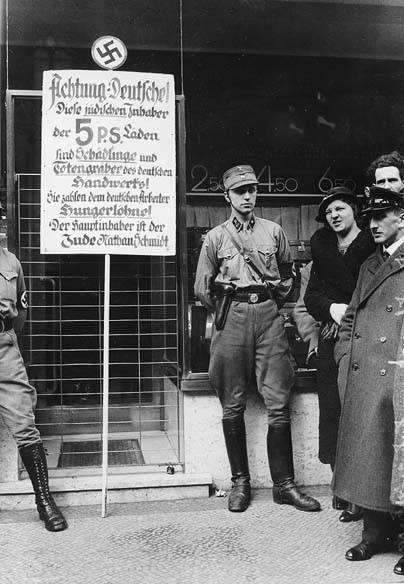
Members of the SA boycotting Jews, 1 April, 1933 . The sign reads: "Attention Germans! These Jewish owners of the 5 PS stores are pests and gravediggers of German craftsmanship! They pay German workers starvation wages! The main owner is the Jew Nathan Schmidt."

In March 1933, the Nazis won a large number of seats in the German parliament, the Reichstag. Following this victory, and partly in response to the foreign Anti-Nazi boycott of 1933, there was widespread violence and hooliganism directed at Jewish businesses and individuals. Jewish lawyers and judges were physically prevented from reaching the courts. In some cases the SA created improvised concentration camps for prominent Jewish anti-Nazis.

Joseph Goebbels, who established the Nazi Ministry of Propaganda and Public Enlightenment, announced to the Nazi party newspaper on 31 March 1933 that "world Jewry" had ruined the reputation of the German people, and wanted to make this boycott a publicly propelled antisemitic action.

At 10 a.m. on 1 April 1933, the Nazis carried out their first nationwide, planned action against Jews: a one-day boycott targeting Jewish businesses and professionals, in response to the Jewish boycott of German goods.

On the day of the boycott, various posts, staffed by paramilitary members of SA, Stahlhelm, and Hitler Youth, were set up in front of Jewish-owned department stores and retail establishments, and the offices of professionals such as doctors and lawyers. The Propaganda Ministry wanted to catch violators of this boycott, looking to German citizens to shame other Germans who ignored the announcement and continued using Jewish stores and services. The Star of David was painted in yellow and black across thousands of doors and windows, with accompanying antisemitic slogans. Signs were posted saying "Don't buy from Jews!" (Kauft nicht bei Juden!), "The Jews are our misfortune!" (Die Juden sind unser Unglück!) and "Go to Palestine!" (Geh nach Palästina!). Throughout Germany acts of violence against individual Jews and Jewish property occurred. In Flatow, a SA member fired a gunshot into the apartment building of Walter Frankenstein. The boycott also affected government employees, with some Reichskommissar offices in Prussia and Bavaria banning Jewish lawyers from entering courts and forcing compulsory leave on Jewish judges.

The boycott was ignored by many individual Germans who continued to shop in Jewish-owned stores during the day. In Annaberg, Saxony, SS members assaulted known patrons of Jewish stores and pressed a rubber stamp on their faces with the words "We traitors bought from Jews". It marked the beginning of a nationwide campaign against the Jews, but due to its negative impact on the German economy it was met with some internal opposition. The Nazi German Austrian daily newspaper (Deutsche-Oesterreichische Tageszeitung) in one article suggested "German national wealth is being deliberately destroyed." and the Silesian Nazi party disapproved, seeing it as destructive to the local economy.

Large anti jewish building star with "NEIN" , "NO" in German

== International impact ==
The Nazi boycott inspired similar boycotts in other countries. In Poland the Endeks (founded by Roman Dmowski) organized boycotts of Jewish businesses across the country.

In Quebec, French-Canadian nationalists organized boycotts of Jews in the 1930s.

In the United States, Nazi supporters such as Father Charles Coughlin agitated for a boycott of Jewish businesses. Coughlin's radio show attracted tens of millions of listeners and his supporters organized "Buy Christian" campaigns and attacked Jews. Also, Ivy League universities restricted the numbers of Jews allowed admission.

In Austria, an organization called the Antisemitenbund had campaigned against Jewish civil rights since 1919. The organization took its inspiration from Karl Lueger, the legendary turn-of-the-century antisemitic mayor of Vienna, who inspired Hitler and had also campaigned for a boycott of Jewish businesses. Austrian campaigns tended to escalate around Christmas and became effective from 1932. As in Germany, Nazis picketed Jewish stores in an attempt to prevent shoppers from using them.

In Hungary, the government passed laws limiting Jewish economic activity from 1938 onwards. Agitation for boycotts dated back to the mid-nineteenth century when Jews received equal rights.

== Subsequent events ==
The national boycott operation marked the beginning of a nationwide campaign by the Nazi party against the entire German Jewish population.

A week later, on 7 April 1933, the Law for the Restoration of the Professional Civil Service was passed, which restricted employment in the civil service to "Aryans". This meant that Jews could not serve as teachers, professors, judges, or in other government positions. Most Jewish government workers, including teachers in public schools and universities, were fired, while doctors followed closely behind. However, the Jews who were war veterans were excluded from dismissal or discrimination (about 35,000 German Jews died in the First World War). In 1935, the Nazis passed the Nuremberg Laws, stripping all Jews of their German citizenship, regardless of where they were born. Also, a Jewish quota of 1% was introduced for the number allowed to attend universities. In the amendment published on 11 April of Part 3 of the law, which stated that all non-Aryans were to be retired from the civil service, clarification was given: "A person is to be considered non-Aryan if he is descended from non-Aryan, and especially from Jewish parents or grandparents. It is sufficient if one parent or grandparent is non-Aryan. This is to be assumed in particular where one parent or grandparent was of the Jewish religion".

"Jewish" books were publicly burnt in elaborate ceremonies, and the Nuremberg laws defined who was or was not Jewish. Jewish-owned businesses were gradually "Aryanized" and forced to sell out to non-Jewish Germans.

After the Invasion of Poland in 1939, the German Nazi occupiers forced Jews into ghettos and completely banned them from public life. As World War II continued the Nazis turned to genocide, resulting in what is now known as the Holocaust.

== See also ==
- Adefa
