= German Fashion Institute =

The German Fashion Institute (Deutsches Modeamt) was founded on June 7, 1933, by the Nazi government to centrally direct and ideologically guide the country’s apparel and fashion industry. Later that summer, it lost its status as an official “Amt” and was reorganized as the Deutsches Mode-Institut, DMI—not to be confused with the modern existing DMI, which traces its roots to a 1928 gentlemen’s fashion institute. From its establishment until the end of World War II in 1945, the Deutsches Modeamt was part of Nazi cultural and economic policy, aiming to promote an “independent German fashion,” exclude foreign (especially French) influences, and eliminate Jewish participation.

== Establishment ==
Following the Nazi seizure of power, the office was formally created on June 7, 1933. Its founding officials included Chair Theodor Oelenheinz, Sigmund von Weech, Hans Horst, and honorary chair Magda Goebbels. Its cultural-political aims included:

- Promoting a distinct “German fashion” that reflected the character of the German woman while aligning with selected international trends
- Ensuring that all designs used exclusively German textiles and materials
- Organizing fashion shows, exhibitions, and public campaigns to stimulate demand for domestic products
- Protecting intellectual property through guidelines against design copying Wikipedia

Even though these tasks were primarily cultural in nature, the economic policy dimension of the Fashion Institute was at the centre of attention. This was evident not only in its strategic objectives, but also in its personnel and institutional orientation: its first chairman, Theodor Oelenheinz, had already made a name for himself in 1922 with his work Das Recht der Erfindung im Patentrecht (The Right to Invention in Patent Law) and was thus considered an expert on industrial property protection in Germany.

In addition, I.G. Farben, a leading industrial group, was represented on the advisory board – further evidence of the close interconnection between fashion policy and economic strategic interests.

== Conflict and transition to DMI ==
The first fabric show in July 1933 led to heated disputes: Jewish companies were involved in the exhibition despite calls for a boycott, which apparently led to Magda Goebbels' resignation as honorary chairwoman; an alternative view explains her resignation with her husband Joseph Goebbels' dissatisfaction with her statement that the less elegant ‘Gretchen type’ was on the way out in Germany because it contradicted the official party line and visual propaganda on the image of women in the Third Reich.

In late summer 1933, the Reich government revoked the Fashion Office's status as an ‘office’; it was renamed and revived as the German Fashion Institute in September 1933.

== Developments and dissolution ==
In 1933, fashion designer and textile entrepreneur Emmy Schoch unsuccessfully applied to the German Fashion Office. In 1934, a second major fashion show followed, as in the previous year with the participation of Jewish fashion companies, despite political pressure towards ‘German fashion’. In March 1936, Herbert Tengelmann took over as chairman and simultaneously headed the clothing and textile industry economic groups under the Reich Industry Group and the Adefa Aryanisation Initiative. Under Tengelmann, the institute moved and split into the politically propagandistic DMI and Mode-Dienst GmbH for practical, commercial tasks. The board of directors included Hela Strehl, Wilhelm Hellmann and Otto Jung (Adefa board member). From spring 1936 to the end of 1937, Hela Strehl became the new managing director with the backing of the Propaganda Ministry, but left the DMI on 31 December 1937 after criticism of her information and PR practices. On 1 April 1938, Hans Croon replaced Tengelmann as president, who became his first deputy. From 1940 onwards, Maria May headed the artistic manufacturing department and retained this position until at least December 1944. Liquidation talks began in early 1941; on 15 October 1941, the DMI was dissolved as the ‘Central Fashion Management’ and the manufacturing division was transferred to the textile industry economic group; on 3 December 1943, it was renamed Textil-Manufaktur e.V. According to historian Irene Guenther of the University of Houston, the German Fashion Institute failed because it was never able to unite the various players or establish an independent, internationally recognised German fashion style due to an unclear definition of ‘German fashion’, financial priorities over cultural vision, internal power struggles and rivalries between industry and the association.

== Distinction from today's German Fashion Institute ==
Today's German Fashion Institute (DMI) in Cologne, which emerged from the German Institute for Men's Fashion, is not the successor to the Nazi institution. It functions as a trade association representing the interests of the German textile and fashion industry in politics, business and the public sphere.

== Literature ==
- Irene Guenther: Nazi 'Chic'. Fashioning Women in the Third Reich. Berg, Oxford/New York 2004, ISBN 1-85973-400-6.
- Aliena Guggenberger: Das System Reformkleid. Die Karlsruher Modeschöpferin Emmy Schoch und die Erneuerung der Frauenkleidung um 1900. Ludwig-Maximilians-Universität München (Inaugural Dissertation), Munich 2023.
- Wagner, Gretel. “Das Deutsche Mode-Institut 1933–1941.” Waffen- und Kostümkunde. Zeitschrift der Gesellschaft für Historische Waffen- und Kostümkunde, Heft 1/2 (1997): 84–98.
- Briefe und Schreiben von Emmy Schoch, 19. November 1933. Generallandesarchiv Karlsruhe, Bestand 235/6181.

== See also ==
- ADEFA, Working Group of German-Aryan Manufacturers in the Garment Industry
