= Gerngroß Department Store =

Department store

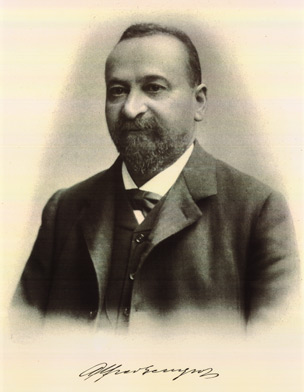
The Founder - Alfred Abraham Gerngroß (1879)

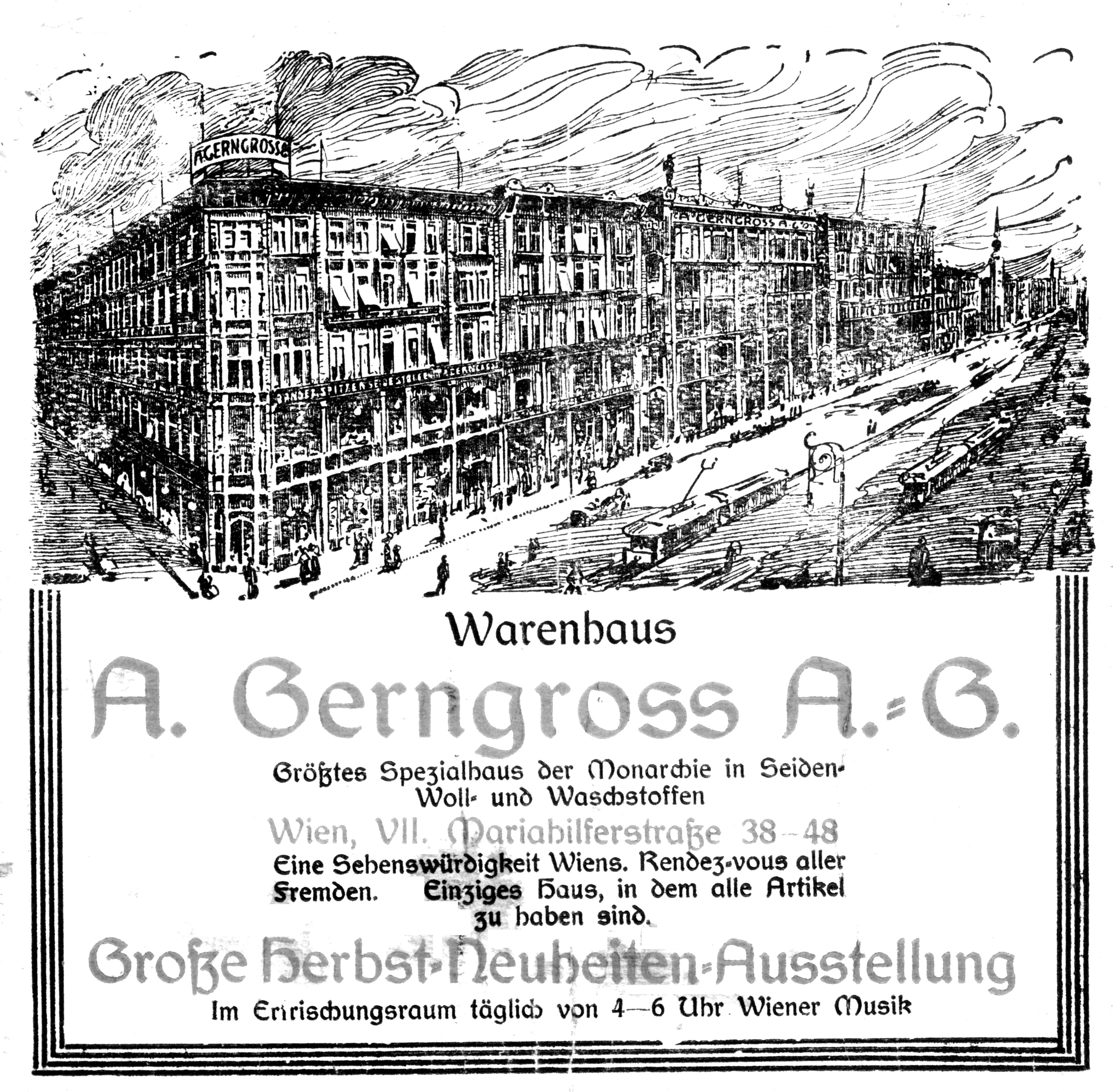
Advertisement (1912)

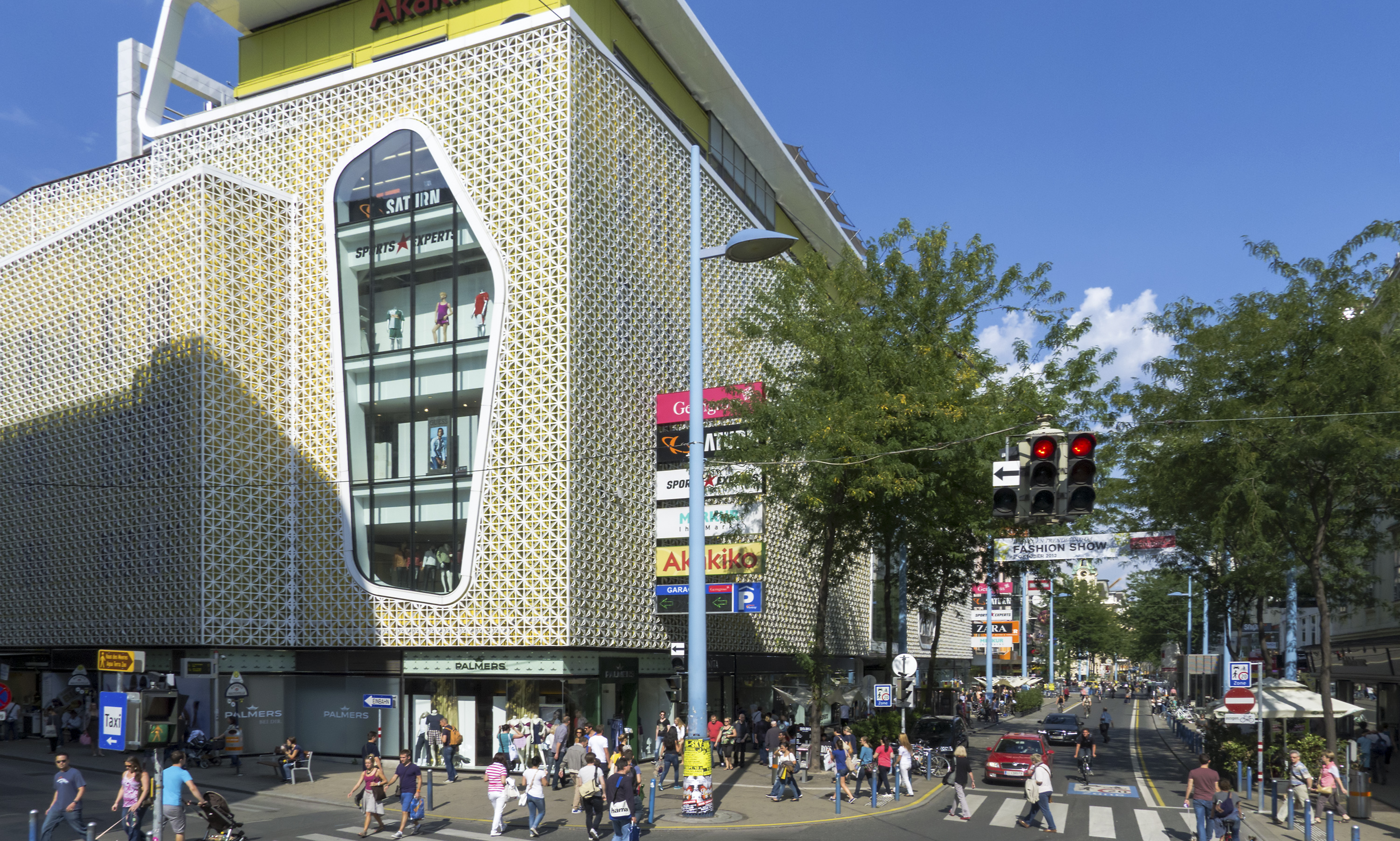
The Gerngross store on the Mariahilferstraße

Gerngroß or Gerngross is a department store in Vienna on the Mariahilferstraße in the city's Seventh District.

== Origins ==
Alfred Abraham Gerngroß (1844–1908) from Forth near Nuremberg, who had learned the drapers trade from August Herzmansky, who had founded, in 1863, a prominent Viennese drapery. Then on 26 September 1879, with his younger brother Hugo (1857–1929), Alfred founded his own store on the corner of Mariahilferstrasse 48 and the Kirchengasse. After a period of competition with his former employer, August Herzmansky, the two companies tried to work together, but this did not prosper, and the collaboration ceased again in 1881.

Through subsequent success, the company was able to acquire 13 neighboring houses over time. In 1883, the company was transformed into a company, the business developed into the largest department store in Vienna and subsequently the largest department store in the Austro-Hungarian empire.

From 1902 to 1904, the architects, Ferdinand Fellner and Hermann Helmer built a new five-story concrete framed structure on Mariahilfer Strasse. The building contained five elevator banks and an escalator. After the death of Alfred Gerngroß, the company was taken over by his sons Albert Johann (1874–1972), Robert Bernhard (1876–1942) and Paul (1880–1954) and on 22 December 1911 it became a public limited company, trading under A. Gerngross A.G.. Another brother, Otto, was also a shareholder but became a Professor and did not work in the business.

At its peak, the department store had around 1,600 employees. The building was topped by a light-tower in 1926.

== 1930s and post-Anschluss ==
The department store was exposed to politically motivated attacks by the Nazis at the beginning of the 1930s, with an attack just before Christmas 1932 attracted special attention. National Socialists invaded the busy department store on Golden (Shopping) Sunday 18 December 1932, and threw tear gas and stink bombs, which caused a mass panic among buyers, causing numerous injuries.

After the Anschluss in 1938, Paul and his wife Martha Gerngroß (and family) had to flee and emigrated to Montevideo in Uruguay. The department store was "aryanized". Otto, who had moved to Turkey, was only shareholder permitted to retain his shares, but in a blocked account. The name of the store was changed to Kaufhaus Wiener - Ludwig & Co. At the end of the Second World War, the store was badly damaged and looted, but was soon rebuilt.

== Post-War ==
Of the brothers, Robert (and his wife, Frieda), were killed in 1942 in the Holocaust near Lublin in Poland, where they had been deported. In 1947, Paul Gerngroß returned to Vienna and was able to take over the management again in the course of a restitution procedure. After his death in 1954, the Gerngross family sold the shares to the Hertie Group in 1957. In 1965, Gerngross was taken over by General Shopping from Luxembourg. As a result, Gerngross opened further branches in Vienna (for example in Floridsdorf Am Spitz) and in other Austrian cities (for example EKZ Gerngross in Klagenfurt).

== Pictures ==
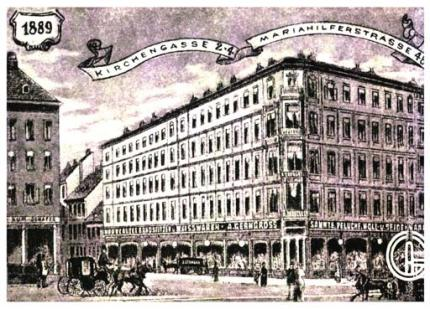
View of the corner of Mariahilfer Straße/Kirchengasse (1889)

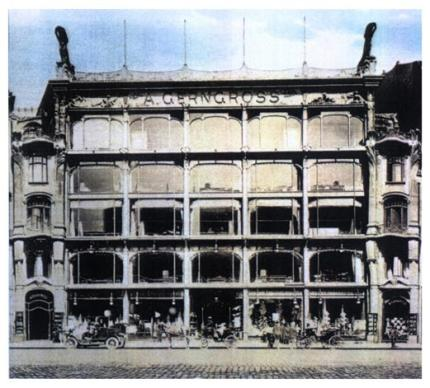
The principal Jugendstil building on the Mariahilfer Straße (1904)

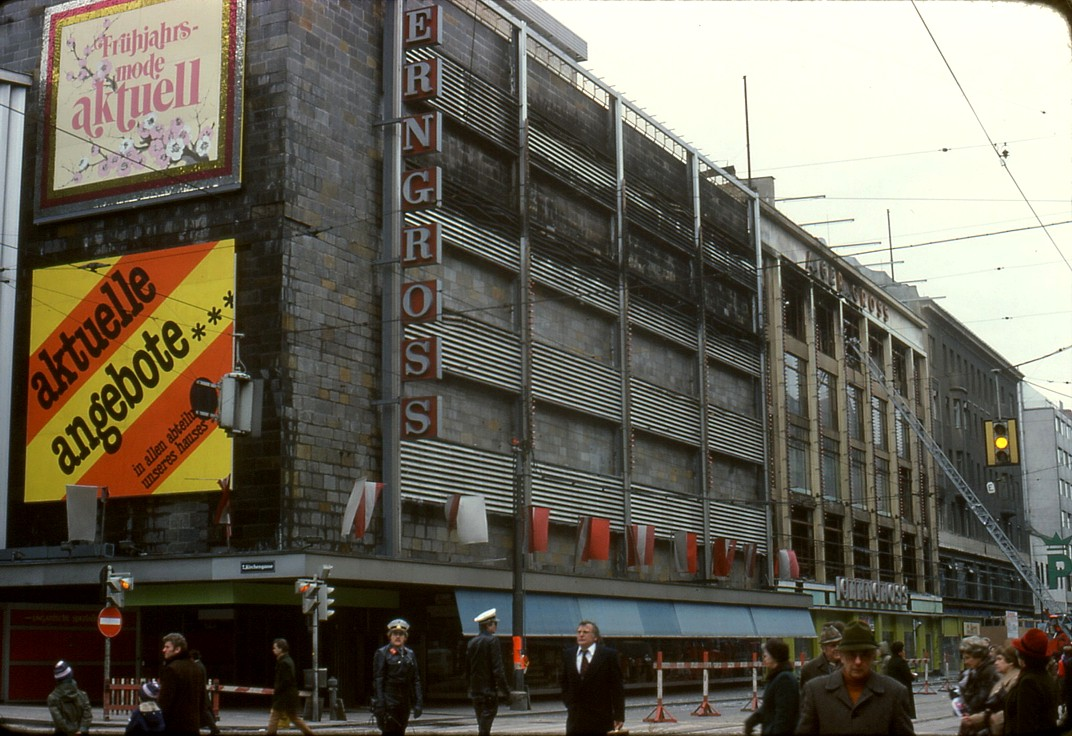
The store after the major fire of 7 February 1979

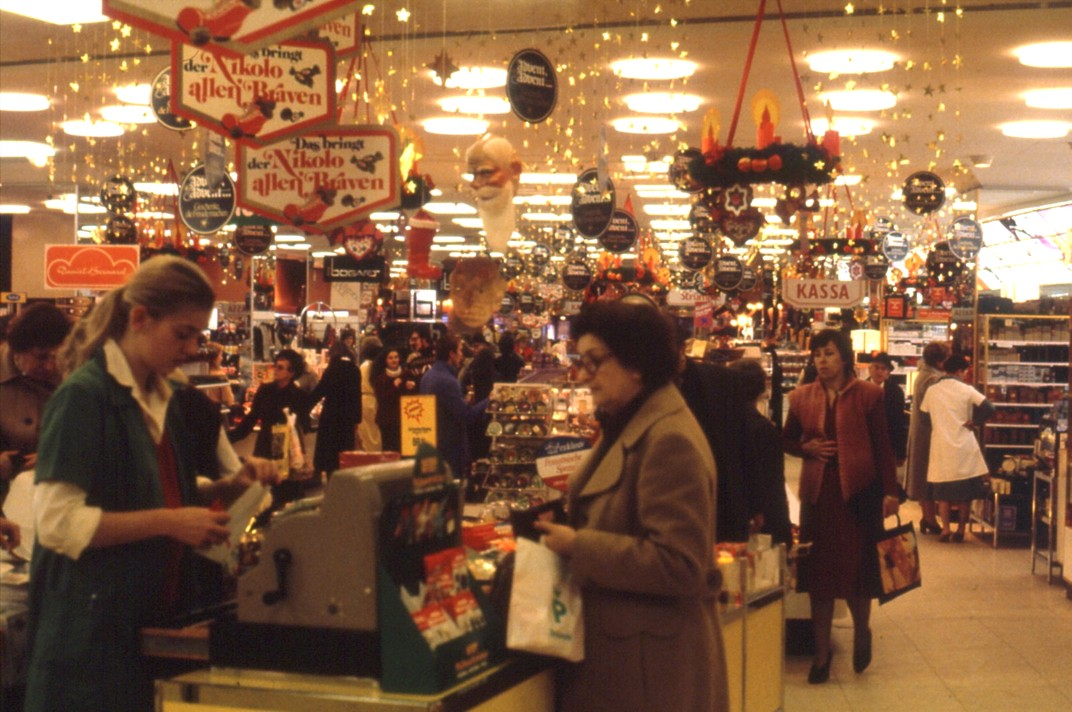
Christmas shopping in December 1979

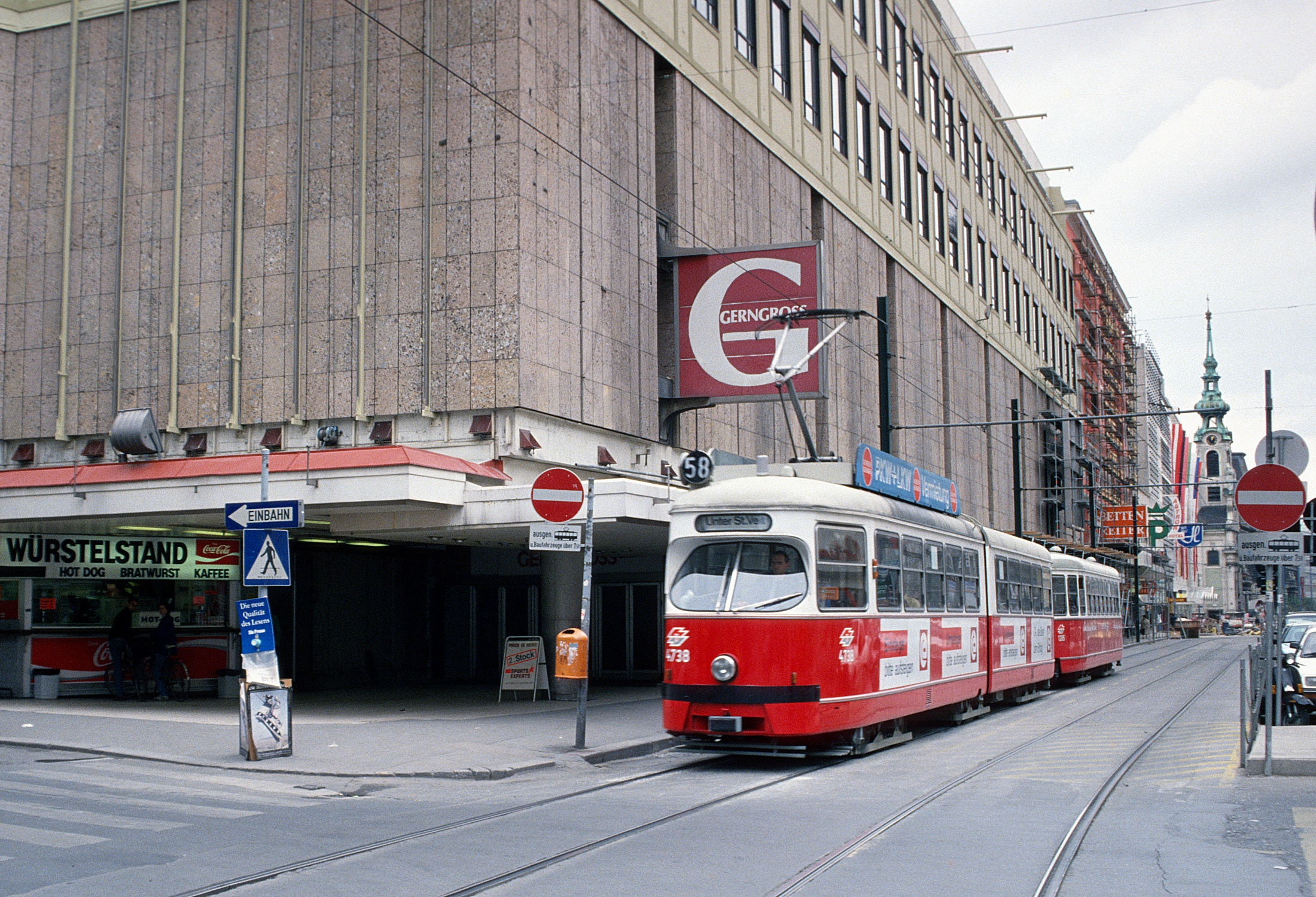
In June 1993
