= Maria May =

German textiles designer and academic (1900–1968)

- Born: 24 September 1900; Berlin, Germany
- Died: 28 October 1968 (aged 68); Berlin, Germany
- Education: Kunstschule, Berlin
- Occupations: Dextiles Designer; Interiors Designer; Teacher; University-level professor
- Spouse: ____ Bernatzik

Maria May (24 September 1900 – 28 October 1968) was a German textiles designer with commercial flair. The scope of her output also embraced other forms of large-format wall art such as mosaics and posters. High-profile commissions included the large mosaic "Tiefsee" ("Deep sea") she produced for the ball room of newly built ocean liner SS Bremen (1928) and a large set of sprayed silk wall tapestries that she produced in collaboration with Otto Arpke for the cabin interiors of the LZ 129 Hindenburg airship. Between 1956 and 1966 she served as head of the "Meisterschule für Mode" (Fashion Academy) in Hamburg.

== Life ==
=== Provenance and early years ===
Maria May was born (and just over sixty-eight years later died) in Berlin. Her parents came originally from Schleswig-Holstein (near the border with Denmark). She numbered "blue-dyers" (of fabrics) among her ancestors. Her father had worked on the ships for a time.

=== Between teaching and commerce ===
She attended the state arts college in Berlin and in 1921 passed her art teaching exams with distinction, and took a teaching position at Berlin's prestigious Reimann School of Arts and Design. She took charge of the class in textiles design and also of the course that she set up for design and decorative painting, which encompassed patterned fabric painting, wall-screen painting and glass painting techniques. Through her collaborative work with I. G. Farbenindustrie she was able to introduce pioneering techniques in her courses in respect of fabric dying and printing, injection printing, batik, along with stencil work on fabrics and leathers. May continued to teach at the Reimann School till 1931, and retained close ties to it in the years that followed. Beyond the school gates she became increasingly well known through her development work in the schools studios, notably following her introduction in 1926 of so-called "Maria May-Stoffe" and "Maria May-Tapetten" (fabrics and carpets) which were taken on by several major manufacturers such as the venerable Rasch Brothers carpet factory. Maria May worked with Rasch for many years on designs for carpets, coverings and wallpapers. "May-Stoffe" was the name used to market a fabric produced using innovative—and industrially applicable—injection printing techniques, and characterised by strong colours and figurative patterns. Sources also cite purely geometric patterns, designs with global-urban motifs and others that struck a historical note. Above all, the flexibility of May's techniques clearly facilitated a rich diversity of designs.

=== Between art and industry ===
By 1930 May was engaging increasingly in long-term contracts with her industrial clients, which coincided with a withdrawal from regular teaching commitments. He prominent mosaic on the ballroom wall on board the SS Bremen (1928), widely viewed during the late 1920s as the fastest and best of the trans-Atlantic liners, against which competing designs would be benchmarked during the 1930s, triggered increasing interest in her work among American critics and opinion formers. As early as 1930 the "Art Alliance of America" invited her to exhibit her work in New York, with evident success. By this time May's fabrics had become well known across Germany, and had also brought welcome publicity for the Reimann School at which she had developed her designs and techniques. Her techniques were applied by Vereinigte Werkstätten at their subsidiary location in Munich from 1928, and her designs were also being produced in industrial quantities by the Monachium factory established as part of a government-backed industrial regeneration scheme at Plauen. In 1932 she designed an extensive range of carpets for Rasch Brothers. By this time Rasch were just one of a number of industrial partners with which she had teamed up. In 1931 she accepted an appointment as artistic director with Christian Dierig AG, with whom she developed the German Cretonne fabrics collection. During a decade in which the technology and design of display infrastructure evolved rapidly, May was engaged on the design of large format injection moulded back panels for shop windows, decorations and accessories for exhibitor stands used a trade exhibitions and trade fair related design work more broadly.

=== Hitler years ===
1933 ushered in the twelve Hitler years. Amid the rapid social and political changes of the period, May pursued her career in industrial design and sustained her links with industry. Sources are for the most part silent about the details of her career during this period, but in terms of her business involvement she appears to have prospered. However, she would have faced pressure to join one or other of the government-backed trade associations; at least one source spells out that she never joined any of the National Socialist organisations. Like many in Germany with long historical memories, she nevertheless welcomed the fall of France in 1940: "The fashion of the past was Paris—the fashion of the future lies with Greater Germany." In 1937 she took over as head of the "Manufacturing Department" at the German Fashion Institute in Berlin: the focus of her responsibilities here involved designing textiles collections for export. In 1939 she won a commission from the long-serving Foreign Minister, Joachim von Ribbentrop, to redesign the interior fittings of the Foreign Office building in the Wilhelmstrasse. That was followed by a succession of similar commissions for various German embassies abroad. According to the papers and diaries of Robert Kempner, a lawyer who was involved with the prosecuting team at the Nuremberg trials, while Maria May was being interrogated she recalled that during the final days of the war von Ribbentrop had entrusted her with five million mark's worth of gold coins to transport on his behalf to Schleswig-Holstein. The story (as remembered and recorded by one retired lawyer whose legacy included a vast hoard of documentary memorabilia about the Nuremberg trials, most of which, according to other lawyers, he should never have taken home in the first place), only surfaced after Maria May and Kempner himself were long dead. As reported it begs more questions than it answers, but it does appear to indicate that by 1945 May was highly regarded (and trusted) by Germany's Foreign Minister. The only other reported detail is Kempner's report of May's comment that "the gold was so badly packed, that when it was unloaded it was suddenly raining gold coins".

=== After the war ===
May 1945 brought another abrupt change of direction for Maria May, who now returned to a full-time teaching post. The western two thirds of Germany were now divided into four large military occupation zones: May left Berlin and settled in Hamburg, in the British zone. Between 1946 and 1955 she served as head of the class in fabrics painting and textiles design at Hamburg's "Landeskunstschule" (as the Fine Arts University was known at that time). For the Landeskunstschule, having regard to May's record in Berlin during the 1920s, the move was presented as an opportunity to form closer ties to industry. In 1955 she moved to take charge of "Department Design" at the institution then known as the "Meisterschule für Mode Hamburg". The city authorities promoted her to a full professorship. May remained at the "Meisterschule" till her retirement in 1965.

On 21 May 1951 Maria May founded the Bonn-based "Deutsche Verband der Berufstätigen Frauen", a West German branch of the US-based, but notionally international, Business and Professional Women's Foundation. (The German organisation had originally been founded in 1931, but had dissolved itself two years later in response to political pressure to transform itself into a party-affiliated organisation.) May served as president of the West German branch between 1951 and 1956. The defining objective was equal rights in the workplace for men and women: the vision included solidarity and mutual support between professional women. The organisation became an umbrella for a number of locally based equivalent groups: May used her time as president and her formidable marketing talents to push for a stronger and clearer national profile for it. Two of her initiatives in this connection were the 1952 "Woche der berufstätigen Frau" (loosely, "Week of professionally engaged women") and, in 1954, the first UNO seminar with expert delegates from both Germany and abroad. In both cases, the objective was to bring about social changes by encouraging acceptance in West Germany of the presence of working women in society.

=== Final years ===
Following her retirement, in 1966 Maria May returned to the city of her birth. Berlin's political divisions being by this time matched by impenetrable physical divisions, she made her home in the city's western part. She died there just two years later.

== Personal ==
Most sources are silent about Marias May's personal life. However, one of them mentions her marriage, to a man called Bernatzik, which ended in divorce during the war.
