= Herzmansky =

Department store in Vienna, Austria

- Type: Department store
- Industry: Retail
- Founded: 1863 Vienna, Austria
- Founder: August Herzmansky
- Fate: Renamed (1998)
- Headquarters: Vienna, Austria
- Key people: August Herzmansky; Johann Herzmansky; Eduard Herzmansky; Johann Falnbigl; Wilfried Falnbigl; Max Delfiner
- Products: Clothing, footwear, bedding, furniture, jewelry, beauty products, and housewares

Herzmansky was a department store in Vienna. It was founded by the Austrian Silesian merchant August Herzmansky in 1863. The department store was located at Mariahilfer Strasse 26–30 / Stiftgasse 3 in the 7th district of Vienna, Neubau. A branch of the Peek & Cloppenburg chain has been in its place since 1998.

The store became the largest drapery/department store in the Austro-Hungarian Empire by 1892. After August's death, his nephews and later other relatives took over the management, with various expansions and renovations taking place over the years. Shortly before the Nazis came to power, the company was sold to the Austrian Jewish merchant Max Delfiner. The store was "Aryanized" during the Nazi period but was later returned to its rightful owner, Max Delfiner, in 1948. After several changes in ownership, mergers, and modernizations, the Herzmansky department store closed in 1997. The site was sold to the Düsseldorf fashion chain Peek & Cloppenburg in 1998, ending the Herzmansky department store's long history. The original building on Stiftgasse still stands, preserving its exterior appearance.

== History ==
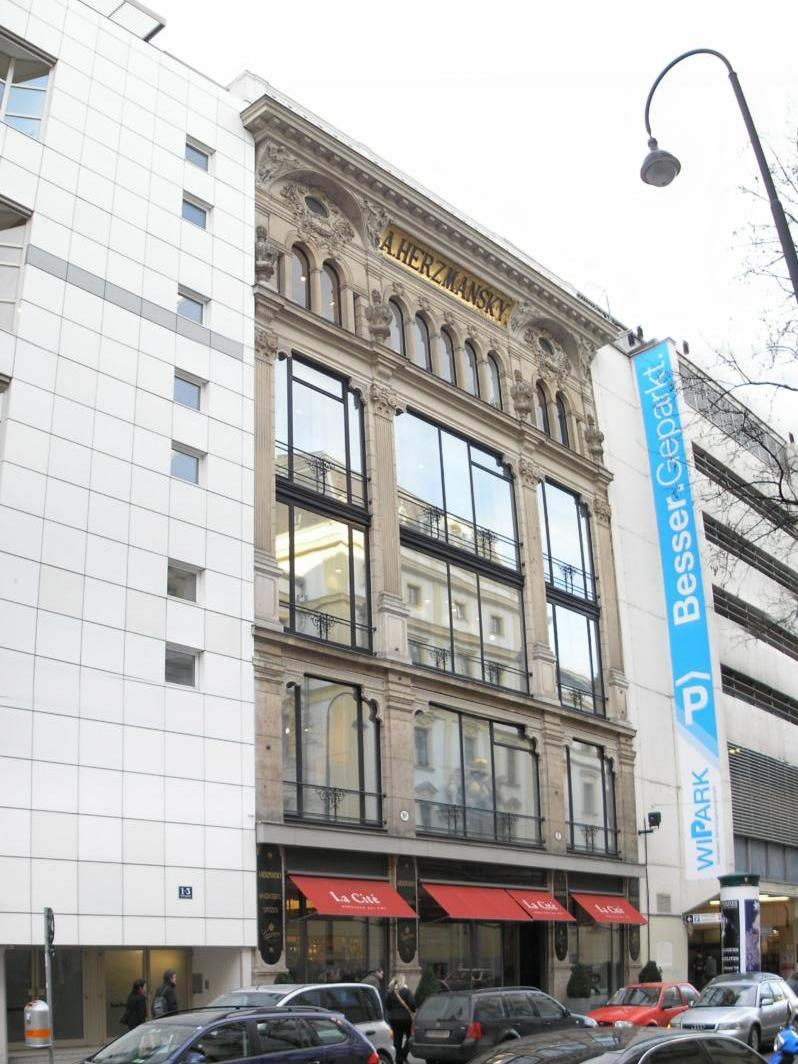
The original building at Stiftgasse 3, where the inscription of Herzmansky can be seen at the top

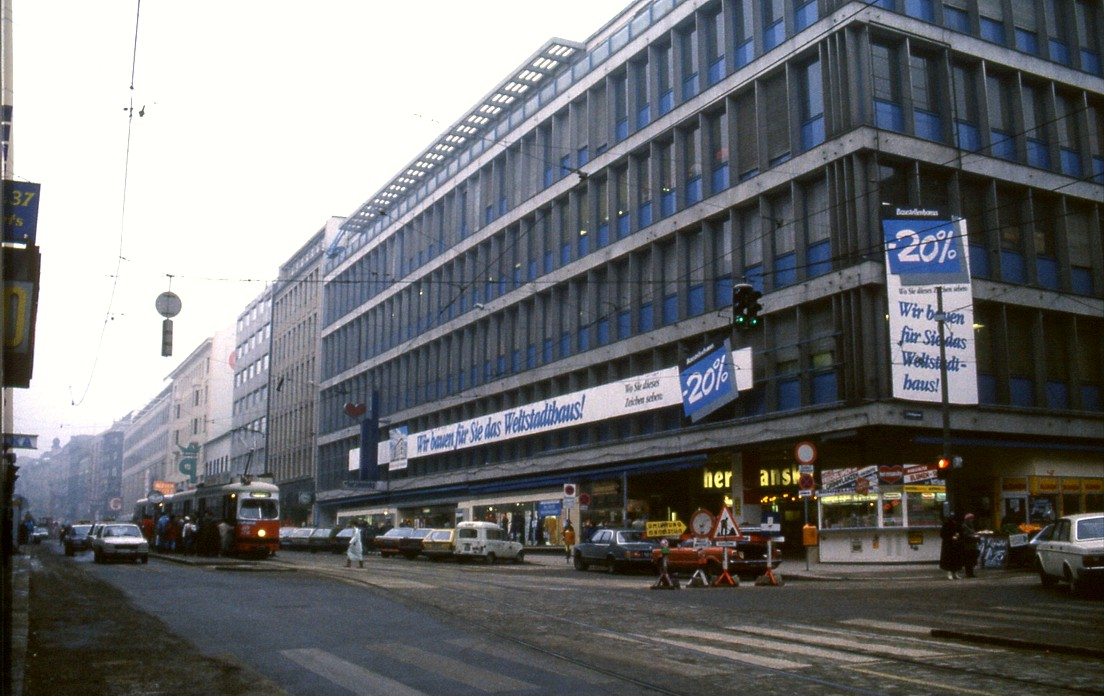
The Herzmansky department store at the Mariahilfer Straße/Stiftgasse corner in 1987

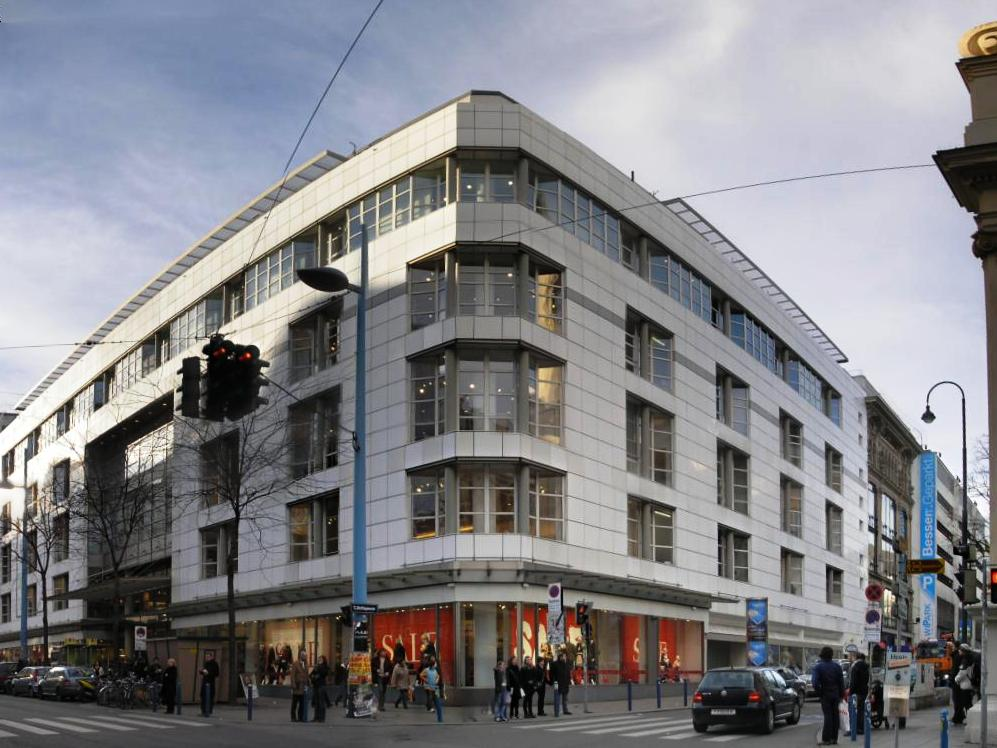
The former Herzmansky department store at the same Mariahilfer Straße/Stiftgasse corner in 2008, now a branch of the Peek & Cloppenburg chain

August Herzmansky, who originated in Odry in what is now the Czech Republic, opened a general store in 1863 in the 7th district at Kirchengasse 2. The concept was well received by the shopping public due to its upscale product range and fixed prices. By 1892 Herzmansky was the largest drapery/department store in the Austro-Hungarian Empire.

Architect Maximilian Katscher built the new building at Stiftgasse 3 between 1896 and 1897. This five-storey building was erected on a deep parcel of land (with a wrought-iron structure). A courtyard was designed in the middle with pillars (with stucco covering) and columns (covered with synthetic marble). At the end of the courtyard was a two-branched three-tier main staircase (also of wrought-iron), which was demolished in 1963. Two more staircases connected the building with another courtyard and a neighboring building. The ground and first floors were supported by the aforementioned limestone pillars, the second and third floors by marble pillars (made from Istrian Smerique marble).

The expansion of the business led to Herzmansky having five locations by 1917.

=== Succession ===
After the death of the company's founder, his nephews Johann (1857–1924) and Eduard Herzmansky (1852–1911) took over the management of the company, but were unable to continue their uncle's success. During this period, Gerngroß department store, which had originally partnered with Herzmansky, established himself with a dominant Art Nouveau building (1904) on Mariahilfer Strasse, which had become the main shopping street of Vienna. In 1906, the nephews left the business. A relative by marriage, Johann Falnbigl (1866-1932), took over the management and became a partner. Major extensions were built in 1908 and 1928 during Falnbigl's management. After Falnbigl's death on 7 February 1932, his son Wilfried took over the management for a short time, but left the partnership in 1933. Max Delfiner was the sole owner of the Herzmansky company from 1933 to 1938.

=== Nazi Period ===
With the Anschluss, the store was "Aryanized" in favor of the Dornbirn-based textile producers Rhomberg and Hämmerle, and the previous Jewish owners had to emigrate. In the period 1938–1940, the purchase of the property at Mariahilfer Strasse 30, giving increased frontage to a thoroughfare with greater footfall, led to an expansion of the sales area and the number of employees to 700 people.

The battle for Vienna in April 1945 caused considerable destruction. On the night of 12–13 April 1945, two Herzmansky stores fell victim to the fires, but operations resumed on 15 May 1945.

=== Post-War ===
On 8 November 1948, the business was returned to its rightful owner, Max Delfiner. The management of the company passed to his son, Henry. Then in 1957 the Delfiner sold the business to the German Hertie Group. In preparation for the centennial celebrations in 1963, larger parts of the building were refurbished, with some parts being demolished. In 1965, the store was sold in turn to a consortium of General Shopping SA, CA-SBC, Turicum AG Inter and Durum Hansa AG. This consortium acquired the neighboring department store, Gerngroß in 1966. Three years later, Gerngroß and Herzmansky merged.

The premises were modernized, and in 1971 a parking garage for 690 cars was put into operation (7th, Stiftgasse 3). In 1988 there was a fundamental conversion to an "adventure department store" (six floors with 15,000 square meters of retail space), opening on 15 September 1988.

In 1996, the Gerngross Group, and thus Herzmansky, was sold to a consortium made up of the Palmers textile group and Hans Schmid, the operator of the GGK advertising agency. While the Gerngross department store was reopened in February 1997, after a renovation, the Herzmansky department store was closed on 12 July 1997.

The Herzmansky site was sold to the Düsseldorf fashion chain Peek & Cloppenburg in 1998. On 4 March 1998 the first Weltstadthaus (world city house) concept store by Peek & Cloppenburg opened in the Herzmansky building. As the name was discontinued, the long history of the Herzmansky department store came to an end, for the time being. Memorabilia and the bust of the founder, which previously adorned the foyer of the department store, are now kept in the district museum in the new building. In 2005, Sparkassen Immobilien AG bought the majority stake in Gerngross Kaufhaus AG from the Palmers Group. These include the department stores Steffl and Herzmansky.

The original building on the Stiftgasse is preserved in its original condition from the outside, with the inscription "A. Herzmansky” framed in the cornice in golden mosaics clearly recognizable, as well as on the black marble panels on the street front at ground level. Today there is an upscale café on the first floor, which is operated by Cafe Gerstner.

== Pictures ==
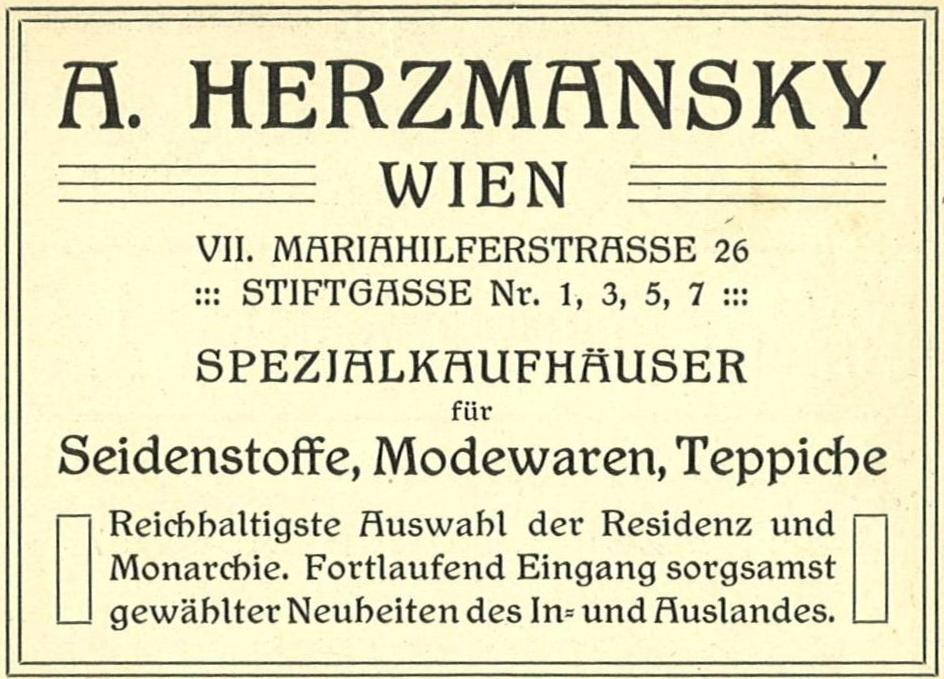
An advertisement from 1906

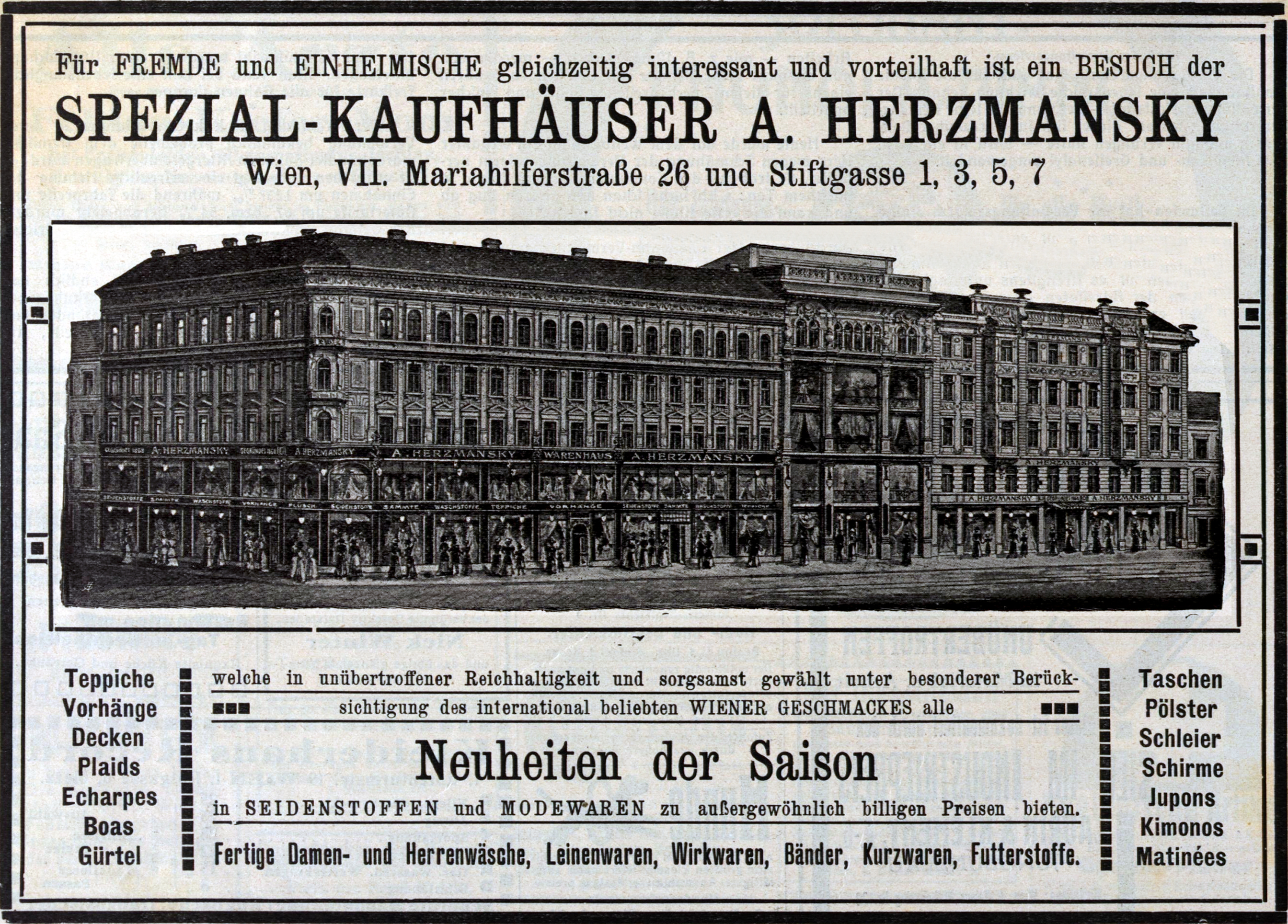
Advertisement in Die Muskete, 1912

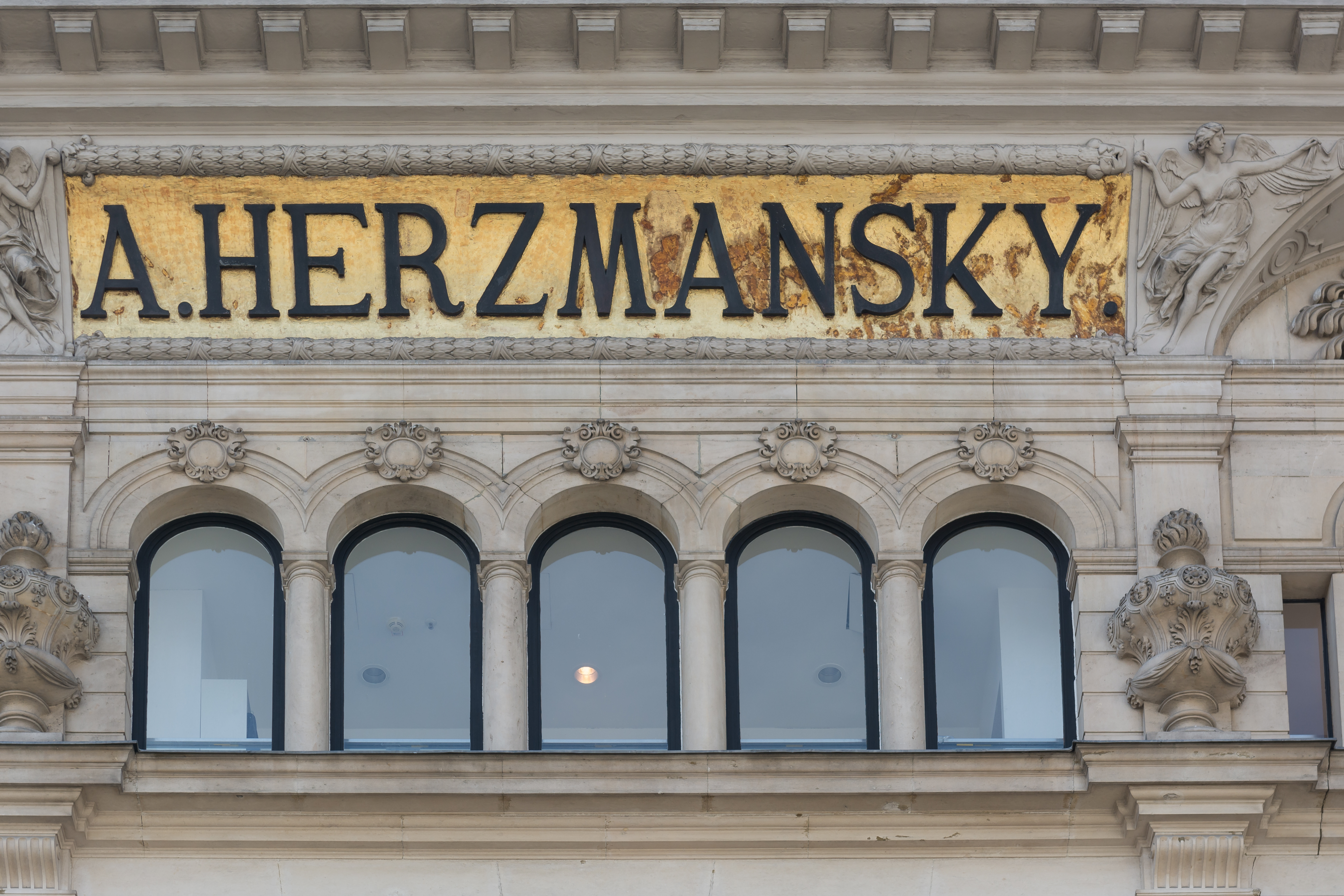
The inscription on the facade of Stiftgasse 3

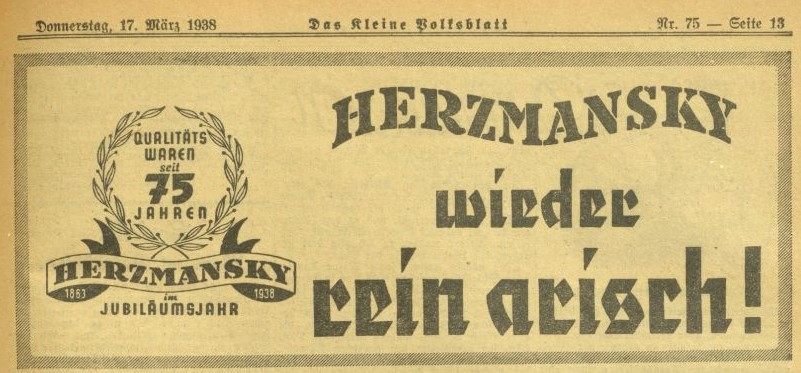
"Aryanization" notice in March 1938, after the "Anschluss" of Austria that month – and at the same time an advertisement for the 75th anniversary of Herzmansky
