= Theodor Oelenheinz =

German legal theorist and author

- Born: 1872
- Died: 1951 (aged 78–79)
- Occupations: Lawyer, author, publisher
- Known for: Abolition of Inheritance (1919)
- Relatives: Leopold Oelenheinz (brother), Karl Georg Hoffmann (grandfather)

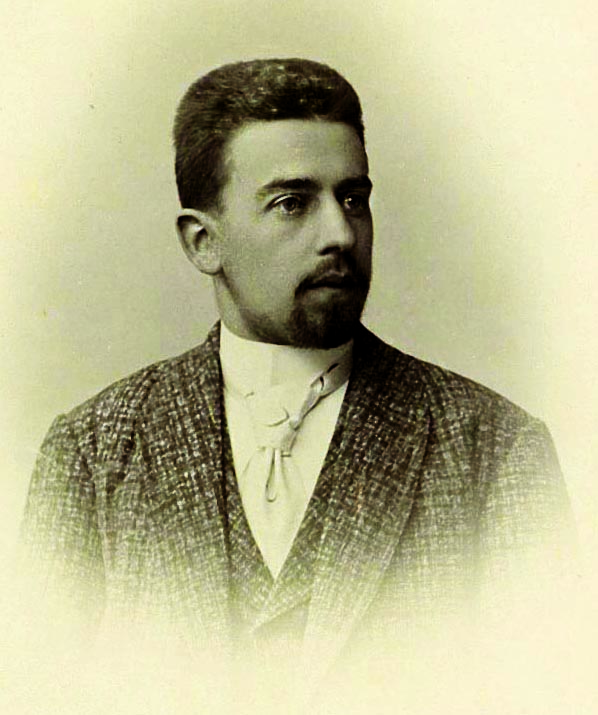
Theodor Oelenheinz as law student 1895

Theodor Oelenheinz (1872–1951) was a German lawyer, author, and legal theorist known for his 1919 publication Abolition of Inheritance (Abschaffung des Erbrechts), a socially progressive proposal for reforming inheritance law in the aftermath of World War I. He was also involved in publishing, political activism, and held affiliations with various political and professional organizations throughout his life.

== Early life and education ==
Oelenheinz was born in 1872, the son of a bank director from Karlsruhe. He was the grandson of Karl Georg Hoffmann, former finance minister of the Grand Duchy of Baden, and the brother of artist and architect Leopold Oelenheinz.: He studied law, economics, and philosophy at the University of Heidelberg, where he received his doctorate summa cum laude in 1897.

== Legal career and military service before and during WWI ==
He worked as a lawyer in Mannheim and Heidelberg from 1899 to 1941. Between 1890 and 1919, he served intermittently in the military, leaving with the rank of captain and good certificates about his achievements and character.

Around 1910, he was promised appointment to the Oberster Kolonial- und Konsulargerichtshof (Colonial and Consular Supreme Court), which was never founded, allegedly due to British intervention. To prepare, he studied international and colonial law at the Oriental Seminar in Berlin for three semesters 1911-1912.

At the end of WWI, Oelenheinz served as head of the reconnaissance unit at German army's Generalkommando Karlsruhe in its Mannheim branch. In this capacity, his task was to lead the promotional activities for the war bonds (Kriegsanleihe) campaign, despite being an outspoken critic of this way of financing the war vis-a-vis taxation as done by England and France.

== Publishing and legal activism (1919–1933) ==
After World War I, during the early Weimar Republic, Oelenheinz served as head of the propaganda office for cashless payments in the district of Lower Baden at the Reichsbank. In his own view, this position — along with his wartime role in promoting war bonds — gave him particularly close insight into the illegitimate devaluation of war bonds during the period of hyperinflation. This experience, he claimed, motivated him to pursue legal action and political activism against the government's handling of the crisis, incl. the publishing of Volkserhebung wider das Unrecht ("People's Uprising Against Injustice"). This declaration denounced the government's inflation policies as unprecedented injustice and illegality.

Both of Oelenheinz larger publications were written during the early Weimar Republic: The Abolition of Inheritance in 1919, and Das Erfindungsrecht in 1922/1923. In 1922, he became founding member of the Staatsorganische Gesellschaft, a Mannheim-based association to promote scientific investigations into the principle that the state must be perceived as part the natural organic systems.

Other involvements during these years include

- Publisher of the weekly newspaper Deutsche Woche in Mannheim between 1928/1929.
- Chairman of German Business Association (Deutscher Wirtschaftsverein e.V.), Mannheim chapter
- Head of the local chapter of People's Justice Party (Volksrechtspartei, 1926–1930)

== Involvement with Nazi-related institutions (1933–1945) ==
Oelenheinz was a member of or affiliated with a number of Nazi associations, including:

- The nationalist Pan-German League, a predecessor of the NSDAP
- The subgroup of commercial lawyers in the German Association of Economists (Reichsverband Deutscher Volkswirte)
- Lawyer Society of Nazi Germany (NSRB / BNSDJ, 1933–1944)
- SA patron member until January 1933 and SS patron member since August 1933
- Financial supporter of the NSDAP via the Opferring since 1932

In 1932, in his capacity as chairman of the German Business Association (Deutscher Wirtschaftsverein), Oelenheinz promoted a nationalist concept of "German fashion." In a speech given at an event with the Deutschnationaler Handlungsgehilfen-Verband (a nationalist and antisemitic white-collar union), he argued that this had a "national-ethical educational value" and served to combat "foreignness". This led him to be engaged with the founding of the Nazi fashion agency Deutsches Modeamt in Berlin around June/July 1933, which was later renamed into Deutsches Mode-Institut. Oelenheinz served as chairman alongside prominent figures such as Magda Goebbels, Sigmund Weech (creator of the German coat of arms and an older version of the Berlin coat of arms) and Hans Horst (former director of the wool company Nordwolle). However, Oelenheinz, Weech, and Goebbels all stepped down as directors within a month of the agency’s founding, likely after Joseph Goebbels intervened when his wife declared that the "unrefined Gretchen type is finally conquered”—a remark at odds with the NDSAP party line— and in protest of Jewish firms taking part in the first fabric show in July 1933 despite boycott calls.

== Postwar rehabilitation and death ==
Despite his affiliations and financial support of the early Nazi period, Oelenheinz never became an NSDAP member. His file at the Lawyer Society reveals several rebukes for non-conforming behavior; colleagues accused him of agitating against the NSDAP. After World War II, authorities in both West and East Germany referred to him as an "antifascist"; he was declared "not affected" during denazification.

Oelenheinz regained his license to practice law in Mannheim in 1950, unsuccessfully pursued a late habilitation at the University of Heidelberg, and appeared as a witness in court cases against Nazi criminals.

In February 1951, Oelenheinz was elected the first chairman of the Heidelberg district committee for the People's Referendum against the Remilitarization of Germany. The referendum, while part of the broader Ohne mich movement, was supported by the Communist Party of Germany (KPD) and held in parallel to an official referendum with the same content in East Germany. It was ultimately banned by the West German government, despite more than 6million collected votes against the remilitarisation.

Oelenheinz died in late 1951.

== Abolition of inheritance (1919) ==
In the 19th century, inheritance tax was often promoted as an effective means of social revolution and reform, with moderates seeking to restrict inheritance rights and more radical approaches seeking to abolish them altogether. Oelenheinz book Abolition of Inheritance (original title Abschaffung des Erbrechts) falls into the latter category.

The book is structured as a formal legislative proposal describing a new inheritance regime. He attempted to strike a balance between Marxist abolition of private property and capitalism. His concept introduced the idea of "property for life", abolishing the right to extend property beyond death. He also proposed a clear distinction between revenue-generating assets (e.g., land, financial assets, rental property, machinery) and private-use goods (e.g., clothing, personal residence, household items, a savings allowance equal to the last annual salary of the deceased).

Mixed-use properties (such as a self-inhabited house with rental units) were classified as revenue-generating and not inheritable. Debt linked to such assets would be assumed by the state, while private debt would remain with the heirs. Dependents were to receive annuities based on the social status of the deceased, funded by interest from confiscated assets. If insufficient, the assets themselves could be gradually liquidated. Ultimately, the state bore responsibility for providing for dependents.

Family businesses could be continued by heirs through lease-rent payments (4% for 20 years). If no heir took over, other shareholders, employees, or external parties could lease them from the state. Otherwise, the state would take over or close the business. Rental housing would be converted into public housing.

Private-use assets would follow a succession order starting with children, then siblings, and ending with the spouse. Fathers could pass to sons, mothers to daughters. Indivisible assets could be auctioned and the proceeds divided. Older, listed buildings could qualify for maintenance inheritance. Private parks open to the public might also be considered private-use property. To prevent evasion, the state could confiscate excessive private-use assets.

According to a 2024 book review, Oelenheinz's proposal is considered bold and partially ahead of its time, but raised critical questions: Annuities based on seized assets might be unsustainable. Criteria like "social status" were undefined and could imply new forms of privilege. The classification of mixed-use properties might discourage efficient property use. Nevertheless, his distinction between revenue-generating and private-use assets may be seen as a precursor to modern policies like tax exemptions for self-inhabited homes in Germany, according to the review.

== Reception ==
Although Theodor Oelenheinz's proposal for the abolition of inheritance was never adopted into law, it has attracted scholarly attention and continues to be discussed in major legal commentaries. His work is cited in the Staudinger Kommentar zum Bürgerlichen Gesetzbuch, one of the most influential contemporary commentaries on the German Civil Code (BGB), as well as in Planck's original commentary, which served as the official legal interpretation at the time of the BGB’s introduction.

Oelenheinz’s broader body of work has also left a lasting mark on various fields. His treatise Das Recht der Erfindung is referenced in the authoritative Busse commentary on German patent law. Moreover, his publication Spiegel der deutschen Inflation: Dokumente, Berichte, Urteile has been cited in historical analyses of German economic history, including Bernd Widdig’s Culture and Inflation in Weimar Germany.

== List of Works ==
- Abschaffung des Erbrechts: Ein Gesetzesentwurf. Deutsche Gemeinwirtschaft. Eugen Diederichs. Jena. 1919.
- Das Recht der Erfindung. Mannheimer Vereinsdruckerei. 1922.
- Volkserhebung wider das Unrecht. Vortrag gehalten bei der Gründung der 131. Ortsgruppe des Hypotheken- und Spar-Gläubiger-Schutzverbandes für das Deutsche Reich, Sitz Berlin-Biesdorf. Mannheimer Vereinsdruckerei. 1924.
- Der Kampf der Regierung gegen das Richtertum. Gläubiger und Sparer. Vol. 1, no. 8. 1925.
- Spiegel der deutschen Inflation: Dokumente, Berichte Urteile. Leipzig. Verlag Volksrecht. 1928. [Editor]
- Die Aufwertung des einmaligen Fernsprechbeitrags: ein Beispiel f. d. Aufwertung fiskalischer Schulden; Rechtsgutachten erst. im Auftr. d. Öffentl. Sparkasse Mannheim. 1928.
