= Aryanization =

Forced expulsion by Nazis of "non-Aryans" from public life

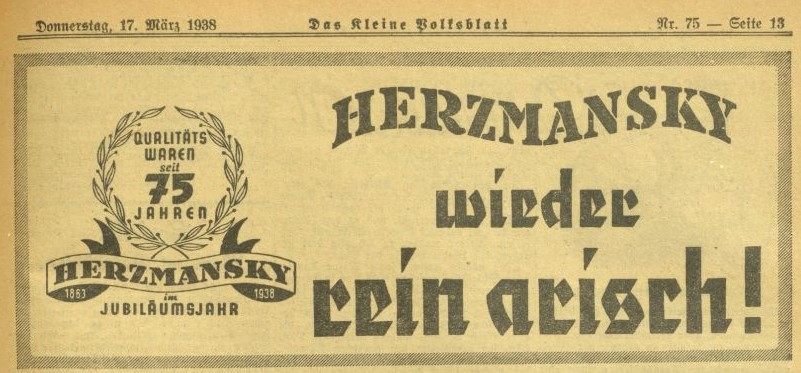
"Herzmansky is purely Aryan again!" – The Herzmansky department store in Vienna was confiscated in March 1938 after the Anschluss, which also took place that month.

Aryanization (German: Arisierung) was the Nazi term for the seizure of property from Jews and its transfer to non-Jews, and the forced expulsion of Jews from economic life in Nazi Germany, Axis-aligned states, and their occupied territories. It entailed the transfer of Jewish property into "Aryan" or non-Jewish hands.

"Aryanization" is, according to Kreutzmüller and Zaltin in Dispossession: Plundering German Jewry, 1933–1953, "a Nazi slogan that was used to camouflage theft and its political consequences."

The process started in 1933 in Nazi Germany with transfers of Jewish property and ended with the Holocaust. Two phases have generally been identified: a first phase in which the theft from Jewish victims was concealed under a veneer of legality, and a second phase, in which property was more openly confiscated. In both cases, Aryanization corresponded to Nazi policy and was defined, supported, and enforced by Germany's legal and financial bureaucracy.

Michael Bazyler wrote that the Holocaust was "both the greatest murder and the greatest theft in history". Between $230 and $320 billion (in 2005 US dollars) was stolen from Jews across Europe, with hundreds of thousands of businesses Aryanized.

== Germany ==
Before Hitler came to power, Jews owned 100,000 businesses in Germany. By 1938, boycotts, intimidation, forced sales, and restrictions on professions had largely forced Jews out of economic life. According to Yad Vashem, "Of the 50,000 Jewish-owned stores that existed in 1933, only 9,000 remained in 1938."

=== Exclusion and dispossession of Jews starting in 1933 ===
Starting in 1933, through the Aryan paragraph and later the Nuremberg Laws, Jews were largely excluded from public life in Germany. Jews were removed from jobs in the public sector, such as the civil service and teaching, and further restrictions were introduced through the Nazi period. Jewish university faculty were removed from departments in German universities in cities including Hamburg, Berlin, Frankfurt am Main, Breslau, Heidelberg, Bonn, Cologne, Würzburg, and Jena.

Later on, an increasing number were incarcerated in Nazi concentration camps, and finally deported to the east where they were murdered directly in death camps or shot by the Einsatzgruppen.

By 1 January 1938, German Jews were prohibited from operating businesses and trades and offering goods and services. On 26 April 1938, Jews were ordered to report all wealth over 5,000 Reichsmarks, and their access to bank accounts was restricted. On 14 June 1938, the Interior Ministry ordered the registration of all Jewish businesses. The state set the sales value of Jewish firms at a fraction of their market worth, and used various pressure tactics to ensure sales only to desired persons. Among the largest "Aryanization profiteers" were IG Farben, the Flick family, and large banks. The proceeds from "Aryanized" firms had to be deposited in savings accounts, and were made available to their Jewish depositors only in limited amounts, so that in the final analysis, Aryanization amounted to almost compensation-free confiscation.

In the autumn of 1938, only 40,000 of the formerly 100,000 Jewish businesses were still in the hands of their original owners. Aryanization was completed on 12 November 1938 with the enactment of a regulation, the Verordnung zur Ausschaltung der Juden aus dem deutschen Wirtschaftsleben (Regulation for the elimination of Jews from German economic life), through which the remaining businesses were transferred to non-Jewish owners and the proceeds taken by the state. Jewelry, stocks, real property, and other valuables had to be sold. Either by direct force, government interventions such as sudden tax claims, or the weight of the circumstances, Jewish property changed hands mostly below fair market value. Jewish employees were fired, and self-employed people were prohibited from working in their respective professions.

=== After Kristallnacht ===
After the "Kristallnacht" pogroms, the pressure of Aryanization was drastically increased. On 12 November 1938, Jews were forbidden to function as business managers, forcing Jewish owners to install "Aryan" surrogates. These people, who were often promoted by the party, first took over the office, and soon thereafter usually the whole business. "Compliant Aryans" (Gefälligkeitsarier) were threatened with punishment according to the Regulation against Complicity with the Camouflage of Jewish Firms (22 April 1938). Because the Jews were burdened with heavy payments as "atonement" for the damage done by the SA and antisemitic mobs during Kristallnacht, the selling off of Jewish property was only a question of time. On 3 December 1938, the value of Jewish landed property was frozen at the lowest level, and valuables and jewels were permitted to be sold only through state offices. The impoverishment of the Jewish population caused by Aryanization often stood in the way of its goal – promoting emigration through persecution – because those affected lacked the means to emigrate. They became victims of the Final Solution.

Many important businesses were sold and re-sold in the course of the process, some of which (such as the Hertie department store) played an important role during the post-war Wirtschaftswunder years in West Germany. After the war, the Federal Republic of Germany paid some restitution for the material losses.

=== Eviction, erasure and cultural appropriation ===
The term Aryanization is sometimes used to refer to eviction of Jewish scientists and people engaged in the cultural sector and in a context of cultural appropriation, for example the Nazi project to provide works such as Handel's Judas Maccabaeus with a new text removed from the intended Old Testament setting. The titles of artworks depicting Jewish people, such as Klimt's famous Portrait of Adele Bloch-Bauer were changed ("The Lady in Gold") to erase their Jewish connection.

=== Complicity in Aryanization ===
The heads of the public 'Landessippenämter' (state offices of mores) and in particular the Protestant pastors and the Evangelical Lutheran Church played an important role in the preparation of Aryanization. They were responsible for Aryan evidence, family and rural farm research, migration movements as well as biographical and local cultural research. In these functions, they were significantly involved as desk clerks and responsible for the ideological propaganda of the Nazi regime in general and the implementation of Nazi racial policy in particular.

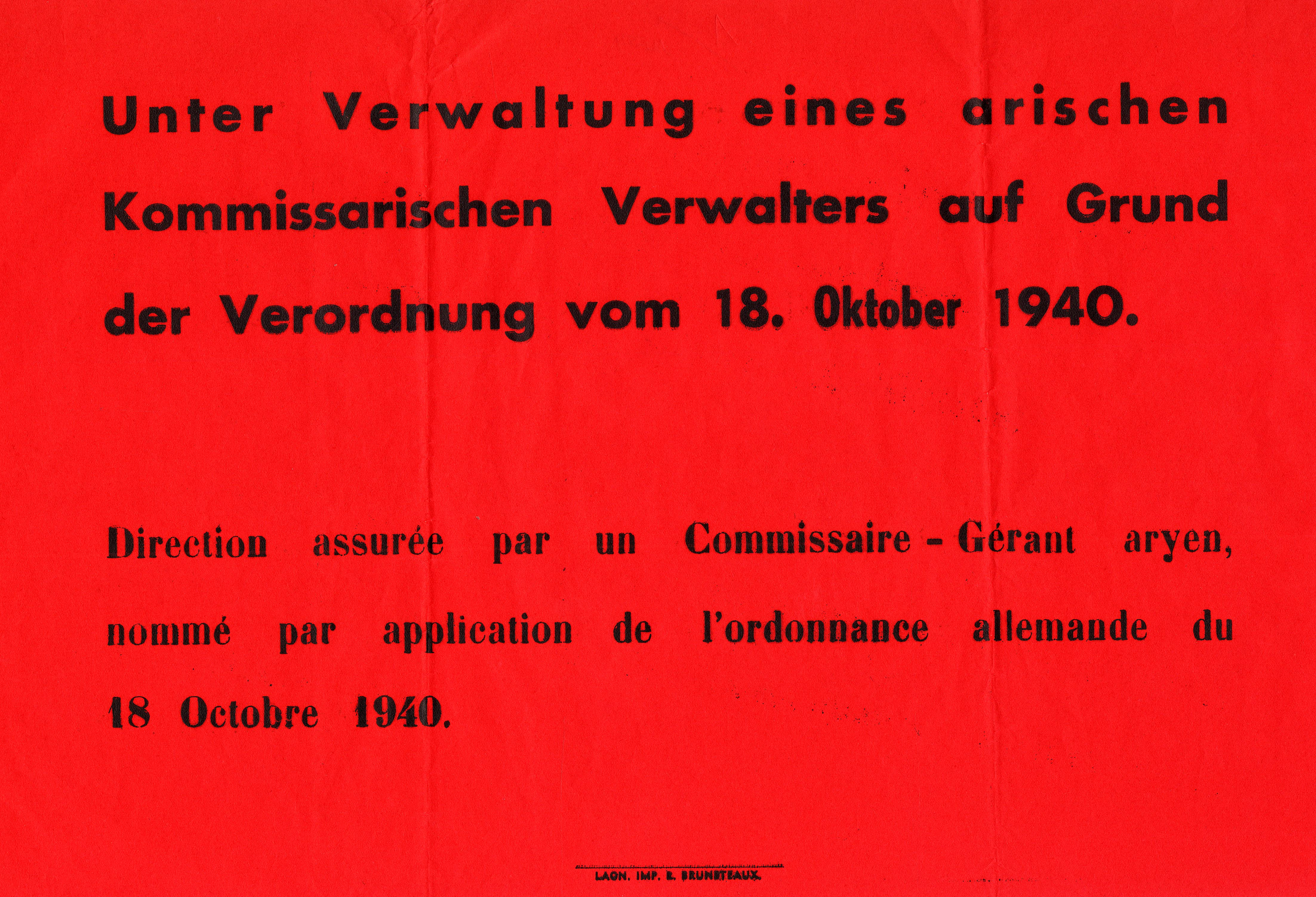
Poster of Aryanization of Jewish businesses, after the Nazi ordinance of October 1940

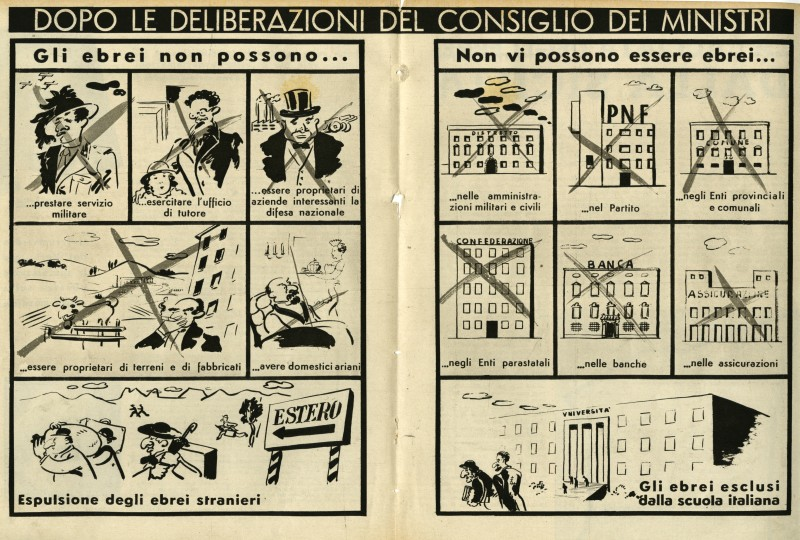
A cartoon presentation of the "Measures for the defense of the Italian race"

== Austria ==
After Austria merged into the Third Reich in the Anschluss on March 12, 1938, Austrian Jews were plundered and thousands of properties seized through Aryanization. Major landmarks owned by Jews, like the Wiener Riesenrad, which had belonged to Eduard Steiner, were Aryanized and their owners murdered. Large and small businesses, from the biggest banks to the smallest family run businesses, were seized from Jews under the guise of Aryanisation. The Vugesta Nazi looting organisation played a key role in disposing of assets of plundered Jews.

== France ==
In Vichy France, Aryanization was governed by a July 22, 1941 law of the French state, which was following the October 18, 1940 Nazi ordinance for the occupied zone. Historian Henry Rousso gives the number 10,000 for the Aryanized businesses. In 1942, the Jewish Telegraphic Agency (JTA) reported that the Nazis claimed that 35,000 French businesses had already been Aryanized. Since the 1990s, there has been considerable research on the subject, and several monographs have been published.

Large and small businesses, including art galleries, were transferred to non-Jews. Examples of companies Aryanized in France include Galeries Lafayette.

== Italy ==
In July 1938, the Manifesto of Race, which declared the Italians to be descendants of the Aryan race. In October 1938, it was followed by the Racial Laws in the Kingdom of Italy, which stripped the Jews of Italian citizenship and governmental and professional positions. The aim of these measures was to achieve the "Aryanization" of Italian society by excluding Jews from various areas of economy, education and social life and having to emigrate.

== Romania ==
In Romania, the Aryanization process was encouraged by tax incentives, as well as outright confiscation. Hardliners complained that some Jews were able to evade the regulations by transferring their businesses to Romanian owners (only on paper). Although Aryanization was to an extent inspired by similar policies in Germany, the Romanian authorities made the key decisions with regards to the implementation of Aryanization.

== Slovakia ==
Aryanization also occurred in the Slovak State. About 12,300 Jewish businesses existed in 1940. By 1942, 10,000 had been liquidated, and the remainder "Aryanized" by transfer to non-Jewish owners.

== In popular culture ==
- The 1965 Oscar-winning Czechoslovak film The Shop on Main Street (Obchod na korze) addressed Aryanization in Slovakia.

== See also ==
- Aryan paragraph
- Ethnic cleansing
- Genocide
- Germanisation under the Third Reich
- Holocaust
- Julius Fromm
- Kristallnacht
- Nazi gold
- Nazi plunder
- Nazism and race
- Racial policy of Nazi Germany
- Reich Flight Tax
- Wannsee Conference
- Adefa
- Walther Funk

== Bibliography ==
- Zentner, Christian and Bedürftig, Friedermann (1991). The Encyclopedia of the Third Reich. New York: Macmillan. ISBN 0-02-897502-2
- Götz Aly: Hitler's Beneficiaries: Plunder, Racial War, and the Nazi Welfare State. Picador; First edition (January 8, 2008), ISBN 978-0805087260
- Götz Aly: Volk ohne Mitte. Die Deutschen zwischen Freiheitsangst und Kollektivismus. S. Fischer, Frankfurt am Main 2015, ISBN 978-3-10-000427-7. (Über millionenfaches Mitläufertum bei der Arisierung und den Massencharakter des Nationalsozialismus.)
- Aalders, Gerard, Nazi Looting: The Plunder of Dutch Jewry during the Second World War, 2004, ISBN 978-1859737224
- Barkai: Vom Boykott zur „Entjudung“. Der wirtschaftliche Existenzkampf der Juden im Dritten Reich 1933–1943. Fischer-Taschenbuch-Verlag, Frankfurt am Main 1988, ISBN 3-596-24368-8.
- Helmut Genschel: Die Verdrängung der Juden aus der Wirtschaft im Dritten Reich. (= Göttinger Bausteine zur Geschichtswissenschaft. 38). Musterschmidt, Göttingen u. a. 1966. (Zugleich Dissertation an der Universität Göttingen 1963)
- Constantin Goschler, Philip Ther (Hrsg.): Raub und Restitution. „Arisierung“ und Rückerstattung des jüdischen Eigentums in Europa (= Die Zeit des Nationalsozialismus. Nr. 15738). Fischer-Taschenbuch-Verlag, Frankfurt am Main 2003, ISBN 3-596-15738-2.
- Harold James: Die Deutsche Bank und die „Arisierung“. Beck, München 2001, ISBN 3-406-47192-7.
- Martin Jungius: Der verwaltete Raub. Die „Arisierung“ der Wirtschaft in Frankreich 1940 bis 1944. (= Beihefte der Francia. Band 67). Thorbecke, Ostfildern 2008, ISBN 978-3-7995-7292-7. (zugleich Dissertation an der Universität Konstanz 2005)
- Helen B. Junz, Oliver Rathkolb u. a.: Das Vermögen der jüdischen Bevölkerung Österreichs. NS-Raub und Restitution nach 1945. (= Veröffentlichungen der Österreichischen Historikerkommission. Vermögensentzug während der NS-Zeit sowie Rückstellungen und Entschädigungen seit 1945 in Österreich. 9). Verlag R. Oldenbourg, München 2004, ISBN 3-486-56770-5. t.)
- Ingo Köhler: Die „Arisierung“ der Privatbanken im Dritten Reich. Verdrängung, Ausschaltung und die Frage der Wiedergutmachung. (= Schriftenreihe zur Zeitschrift für Unternehmensgeschichte. 14). Beck, München 2005, ISBN 3-406-53200-4. (Zugleich Dissertation an der Universität Bochum 2003)
- Joel Levi: Die Arisierung jüdischer Anwaltskanzleien. In: Anwälte und ihre Geschichte : zum 140. Gründungsjahr des Deutschen Anwaltvereins. Mohr Siebeck, Tübingen 2011, ISBN 978-3-16-150757-1, S. 305–314.
- Johannes Ludwig: Boykott, Enteignung, Mord. Die „Entjudung“ der deutschen Wirtschaft. Überarbeitete Neuausgabe. Piper, München/ Zürich 1992, ISBN 3-492-11580-2.
- Melissa Müller, Monika Tatzkow: Lost Lives, Lost Art: Jewish Collectors, Nazi Art Theft, and the Quest for Justice ISBN 978-0865652637.
- Werner Schroeder: Die „Arisierung“ jüdischer Antiquariate zwischen 1933 und 1942. In: Aus dem Antiquariat. Teil 1: NF 7, Nr. 5, 2009, ISSN 0343-186X, S. 295–320; Teil 2: Nr. 6, 2009, S. 359–386.
- Dirk Schuster: "Entjudung" als göttliche Aufgabe – Die Kirchenbewegung Deutsche Christen und das Eisenacher Entjudungsinstitut im Kontext der nationalsozialistischen Politik gegen Juden. In: Schweizerische Zeitschrift für Religions- und Kulturgeschichte. Band 106, 2012, S. 241 bis 255.
- Peter Melichar: Unternehmer im Nationalsozialismus. Zur sozialen Funktion der Arisierung. In: Österreich in Geschichte und Literatur. 2/2016, S. 197–211.
- Irmtrud Wojak, Peter Hayes (Hrsg.): „Arisierung“ im Nationalsozialismus: Volksgemeinschaft, Raub und Gedächtnis. Frankfurt am Main 2000, ISBN 3-593-36494-8.

=== Regions ===
- Anderl, Gabriele, Schallmeiner, Anneliese; Confiscated Assets in Trieste: A List of Austrian Jewish Owners in Viennese Archives. A Workshop Report, Studi Di Memofonte Rivista on-line semestrale Numero 22/2019
- Frank Bajohr: „Arisierung“ in Hamburg. Die Verdrängung der jüdischen Unternehmer 1933–1945. Christians, Hamburg 1997, ISBN 3-7672-1302-8. (Zugleich Dissertation an der Universität Hamburg 1996/97)
- Hanno Balz: Die „Arisierung“ von jüdischem Haus- und Grundbesitz in Bremen. Edition Temmen, Bremen 2004, ISBN 3-86108-689-1.
- Gerhard Baumgartner, Historikerkommission der Republik Österreich: "Arisierungen", beschlagnahmte Vermögen, Rückstellungen und Entschädigungen im Burgenland. (= Veröffentlichungen der Österreichischen Historikerkommission: Vermögensentzug während der NS-Zeit sowie Rückstellungen und Entschädigungen seit 1945 in Österreich. Band 17). Oldenbourg, 2004, ISBN 3-486-56781-0.
- Christof Biggeleben, Beate Schreiber, Kilian J. L. Steiner (Hrsg.): „Arisierung“ in Berlin. Metropol, Berlin 2007, ISBN 978-3-938690-55-0.
- Ramona Bräu: „Arisierung“ in Breslau: Die „Entjudung“ einer deutschen Großstadt und deren Entdeckung im polnischen Erinnerungsdiskurs. VDM, Saarbrücken 2008, ISBN 978-3-8364-5958-7 (online in der Digitalen Bibliothek Thüringen).
- Axel Drecoll: Der Fiskus als Verfolger. Die steuerliche Diskriminierung der Juden in Bayern 1933–1941/42. Oldenbourg Wissenschaftsverlag, München 2009, ISBN 978-3-486-58865-1 (Volltext online verfügbar).
- Christian Faludi, Monika Gibas: Dokumentation der Beraubung – Das Forschungsprojekt „‚Arisierung‘ in Thüringen“. In: Medaon – Magazin für jüdisches Leben in Forschung und Bildung. Heft 3/2008. (PDF; 138 kB)
- Christiane Fritsche: Ausgeplündert, zurückerstattet und entschädigt – Arisierung und Wiedergutmachung in Mannheim. Regionalkultur, Mannheim 2012, ISBN 978-3-89735-772-3.
- Monika Gibas (Hrsg.): „Arisierung“ in Thüringen. Entrechtung, Enteignung und Vernichtung der jüdischen Bürger Thüringens 1933–1945. (= Quellen zur Geschichte Thüringens. 27). 2 Bände. 2. Auflage. Landeszentrale für politische Bildung Thüringen, Erfurt 2008, ISBN 978-3-937967-06-6.
- Monika Gibas (Hrsg.): „Arisierung“ in Leipzig. Annäherung an ein lange verdrängtes Kapitel der Stadtgeschichte der Jahre 1933 bis 1945. Leipziger Universitätsverlag, Leipzig 2007, ISBN 978-3-86583-142-2.
- Wilhelm Hahn: Der Kampf schleswig-holsteinischer Städte gegen die Judenemanzipation. In: ZSHG 70/71, 1943, S. 308.
- Ulrike Haerendel: Kommunale Wohnungspolitik im Dritten Reich. Siedlungsideologie, Kleinhausbau und „Wohnraumarisierung“ am Beispiel Münchens. München 1999. (zugleich Dissertation, Technische Universität München, 1996) (Volltext digital verfügbar).
- Matthias Henkel, Eckart Dietzfelbinger (Hrsg.): Entrechtet. Entwürdigt. Beraubt: Die Arisierung in Nürnberg und Fürth. Imhof, Petersberg 2012, ISBN 978-3-86568-871-2. (Begleitbuch zur Ausstellung im Dokumentationszentrum Reichsparteitagsgelände)
- David de Jong: Nazi Billionaires: The Dark History of Germany's Wealthiest Dynasties, 2022 ISBN 978-1328497888
- Anne Klein, Jürgen Wilhelm: NS-Unrecht vor Kölner Gerichten nach 1945. Greven Verlag, Köln 2003, {{ISBN|3-7743-0338-X}}.
- Christoph Kreutzmüller: Ausverkauf. Die Vernichtung der jüdischen Gewerbetätigkeit in Berlin 1930–1945. Metropol, Berlin 2012, ISBN 978-3-86331-080-6.
- Jürgen Lillteicher: Rückerstattung jüdischen Vermögens in Westdeutschland nach 1945. Dissertation. 2002 Dis Lillteicher Rückerstattung (pdf).
- Jürgen Lillteicher, Constantin Goschler (Hrsg.): „Arisierung“ und Restitution. Die Rückerstattung jüdischen Eigentums in Deutschland und Österreich nach 1945 und 1989. Wallstein, Göttingen 2002, ISBN 3-89244-495-1.
- Stephan Linck: Die Nordkirche und ihr Umgang mit der NS-Vergangenheit. Podcast #16 mit Stephan Linck, Kiel, 20. Januar 2022 (Alles, was Wissen schafft. Podcast der Landesvertretung Schleswig-Holstein, 40:54 Min, verfügbar als MP3-Audio-Datei sowie als Transkript).
- Ingo Loose: Kredite für NS-Verbrechen. Die deutschen Kreditinstitute in Polen und die Ausraubung der polnischen und jüdischen Bevölkerung 1939–1945. (=Studien zur Zeitgeschichte 75). Oldenbourg, München 2007, ISBN 978-3-486-58331-1 (Volltext digital verfügbar).
- Peter Melichar: Verdrängung und Expansion. Enteignungen und Rückstellung in Vorarlberg. (= Veröffentlichungen d. Öst. Historikerkommission. 19). Wien/ München 2004.
- Christian Reder: Deformierte Bürgerlichkeit. Wien 2016, ISBN 978-3-85476-495-3. ("Arisierungen" in Wien)
- Walter Riccius, Jacques Russ (1867-1930), Puma-Schuh-Spur, Verlag Dr. Köster 2021 Berlin.
- Hubert Schneider: Die Entjudung des Wohnraums – Judenhäuser in Bochum / Die Geschichte der Gebäude und ihrer Bewohner. LIT Verlag, Berlin 2010, ISBN 978-3-643-10828-9.
- Tina Walzer, Stephan Templ: Unser Wien. „Arisierung“ auf österreichisch. Aufbau, Berlin 2001, ISBN 3-351-02528-9.
- Michael Weise: Kein Platz für Abraham und Mose in Gottes Haus. Die systematische 'Entjudung' der Thüringer Kirchenräume in der NS-Zeit. In: Mitteilungen zur Kirchlichen Zeitgeschichte 16 (2022), S. 11–36.

=== Specific firms or individuals ===
- Götz Aly, Michael Sontheimer: Fromms : how Julius Fromm's condom empire fell to the Nazis, Other Press, New York, 2009 ISBN 978-1590512968
- Bastian Blachut: „Arisierung“ als Geschäftsprinzip? Die Monopolisierung des deutschen Entzinnungsmarktes zwischen 1933 und 1939 durch die Th. Goldschmidt AG in Essen. Klartext, Essen 2012, ISBN 978-3-8375-0666-2.
- Peter Melichar: Neuordnung im Bankwesen. Die NS-Maßnahmen und die Problematik der Restitution. (= Veröffentlichungen d. Öst. Historikerkommission. 11). Wien, München 2004.
- Ulrike Felber, Peter Melichar, Markus Priller, Berthold Unfried, Fritz Weber: Ökonomie der Arisierung. Teil 2: Wirtschaftssektoren, Branchen, Falldarstellungen. Zwangsverkauf, Liquidierung und Restitution von Unternehmen in Österreich 1938 bis 1960. (= Veröffentlichungen d. Öst. Historikerkommission. 10/2). Wien/ München 2004.
- Wilhelm Hahn: Der Kampf schleswig-holsteinischer Städte gegen die Judenemanzipation. In: ZSHG 70/71, 1943, S. 308.
- Gregor Spuhler, Ursina Jud, Peter Melichar, Daniel Wildmann: Arisierungen in Österreich und ihre Bezüge zur Schweiz. Beitrag zur Forschung. (= Veröffentlichungen der Unabhängigen Expertenkommission Schweiz – Zweiter Weltkrieg. 20). Zürich 2002.
- Jens Schnauber: Die Arisierung der Scala und Plaza. Varieté und Dresdner Bank in der NS-Zeit. Weidler, Berlin 2002, ISBN 3-89693-199-7.
- Joachim Scholtyseck: Liberale und „Arisierungen“: Einige Fallbeispiele und ein Ausblick. In: Heuss-Forum 8/2017.
- Manuel Werner: Cannstatt – Neuffen – New York. Das Schicksal einer jüdischen Familie in Württemberg. Mit den Lebenserinnerungen von Walter Marx. Sindlinger-Burchartz, Nürtingen/Frickenhausen 2005, ISBN 3-928812-38-6. (darin ausführliche Schilderung der „Arisierung“ einer Bandweberei, der Mechanismen, Vorstufen, der beteiligten Personen und Institutionen, der Wirkung auf die jüdischen Inhaber und knappe Darstellung der Rückerstattung)
