= Adefa =

The Working Group of German-Aryan Manufacturers in the Garment Industry (German: Arbeitsgemeinschaft deutsch-arischer Fabrikanten der Bekleidungsindustrie), better known as Adefa, was a clothing union established in Germany in May 1933, associated with the wider Aryanization campaign of the NSDAP-government. It had similar goals to the Deutsches Mode-Institut, which was associated with the Reich Ministry of Public Enlightenment and Propaganda.

== Aryanization ==
The primary aim of the organisation was to bring the German fashion industry under the ownership of ethnic Germans and to remove German Jews from the industry; a goal achieved by 15 August 1939, after which Adefa dissolved itself. Culturally, it opposed French stylistic influence in the German fashion industry, in particular "La Garçonne"-style, encouraging instead a more folk-orientated fashion for women; the tracht dress, dirndl skirts, embroidery and Bavarian style millinery.

At its height in 1938, there were over 600 member firms allied to Adefa. Companies which fell under this banner would show in their show shop advertisements and labels the phrase "Adefa – das Zeichen für Ware aus arischer Hand" (Adefa – the label for Aryan-made clothing).

== See also ==
- Hugo Boss
- Women in Nazi Germany
- Nazi boycott of Jewish businesses
- Let's trim our hair in accordance with the socialist lifestyle

== Bibliography ==
- Irene Guenther: Nazi Chic? – Fashioning Women in the Third Reich. Oxford 2004.
- Roberta S. Kremer: Broken Threads. The Destruction of the Jewish Fashion Industry in Germany and Austria. Oxford 2007.
